= List of non-marine molluscs of Spain =

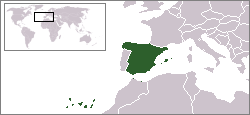
Location of Spain

The non-marine molluscs of Spain are a part of the molluscan fauna of Spain.

Non-marine molluscs of the Canary Islands are listed separately.

There are more than 300 species of non-marine molluscs living in the wild in Spain.

== Freshwater gastropods ==
Neritidae

- Theodoxus fluviatilis (Linnaeus, 1758)

Ampullariidae

- Pomacea insularum (d'Orbigni, 1835) - invasive species

Viviparidae

- Cipangopaludina chinensis (J. E. Gray, 1833) - invasive species
- Sinotaia quadrata (Benson, 1842) - invasive species

Melanopsidae

- Melanopsis tricarinata dufouri
- Melanopsis penchinati Bourguignat, 1868
- Melanopsis praemorsa (Linnaeus, 1758)

Thiaridae

- Melanoides tuberculata (O. F. Müller, 1774) - invasive species

Amnicolidae

- Bythinella andorrensis andorrensis (Paladilhe, 1874)
- Bythinella batalleri Bofill, 1925 - endemic to Spain
  - Bythinella batalleri batalleri Bofill, 1925 - endemic to Spain
  - Bythinella batalleri cuenca Boeters, 2019 - endemic to Spain
- Bythinella baudoni (Paladilhe, 1874)
- Bythinella espanoli Bech, 1980 - endemic to Spain
- Bythinella persuturata Bofill, Haas & Aguilar-Amat, 1921 - endemic to Spain
- Bythinella rolani Boeters, 2019 - endemic to Spain
- Bythinella servainiana (Paladilhe, 1870)
- Bythinella tajoensis Boeters, 2019 - endemic to Spain
- Bythinella tejedoi Boeters, 2019
- Bythinella ullaensis Boeters & Falkner, 2008 - endemic to Spain

Bithyniidae

- Bithynia kobialkai Glöer & Beckmann, 2007 - endemic to Mallorca and Ibiza
- Bithynia leachii (Sheppard, 1823)
- Bithynia majoricina Glöer & Rolán, 2007 - endemic to Mallorca
- Bithynia nakeae Glöer & Beckmann, 2007 - endemic to Mallorca and Ibiza
- Bithynia quintanai Glöer & Rolán, 2007 - endemic to Mallorca
- Bithynia tentaculata (Linnaeus, 1758)

Hydrobiidae

- Alzoniella asturica (Boeters & Rolán, 1988) - endemic to Spain
- Alzoniella camocaensis Rolán & Boeters, 2015 - endemic to Spain
- Alzoniella cantabrica (Boeters, 1983) - endemic to Spain
- Alzoniella edmunti (Boeters, 1984) - endemic to Mallorca
- Alzoniella elliptica (Paladilhe, 1874)
- Alzoniella galaica (Boeters & Rolán, 1988) - endemic to Spain
- Alzoniella iberopyrenaica Arconada, Rolán & Boeters, 2007 - endemic to Spain
- Alzoniella lucensis (Rolán, 1993)
- Alzoniella marianae Arconada, Rolán & Boeters, 2007 - endemic to Spain
- Alzoniella montana (Rolán, 1993) - endemic to Spain
- Alzoniella murita Boeters, 2003 - endemic to Spain
- Alzoniella onatensis Boeters, 2003 - endemic to Spain
- Alzoniella ovetensis (Rolán, 1993) - endemic to Spain
- Alzoniella pellitica Arconada, Rolán & Boeters, 2007
- Alzoniella rolani (Boeters, 1986)
- Alzoniella somiedoensis Arconada, Rolán & Boeters, 2009 - endemic to Spain
- Aretiana wolfi (Boeters & Glöer, 2007) - endemic to Spain
- Belgrandia boscae (J. M. Salvañá, 1887) - endemic to Spain
- Boetersiella davisi Arconada & Ramos, 2001 - endemic to Spain
- Boetersiella sturmi (Rosenhauer, 1856) - endemic to Spain
- Chondrobasis levantina Ramos & Arconada, 2001 - endemic to Spain
- Corbellaria celtiberica Callot-Girardi & Boeters, 2012 - endemic to Spain
- Corrosella andalusica (Delicado, Machordom & Ramos, 2012) - endemic to Spain
- Corrosella bareai (Delicado, Machordom & Ramos, 2012) - endemic to Spain
- Corrosella collingi (Boeters, Callot-Girardi & Knebelsberger, 2015) - endemic to Spain
- Corrosella falkneri Boeters, 1970 - endemic to Spain
- Corrosella herreroi (Bech, 1993) - endemic to Spain
- Corrosella hinzi (Boeters, 1986) - endemic to Spain
- Corrosella hydrobiopsis (Boeters, 1999) - endemic to Spain
- Corrosella iruritai (Delicado, Machordom & Ramos, 2012) - endemic to Spain
- Corrosella luisi (Boeters, 1984) - endemic to Spain
- Corrosella marisolae (Delicado, Machordom & Ramos, 2012) - endemic to Spain
- Corrosella navasiana (Fagot, 1907) - endemic to Spain
- Corrosella segoviana (Talaván Serna & Talaván Gómez, 2019) - endemic to Spain
- Corrosella tajoensis (Boeters, Callot-Girardi & Knebelsberger, 2015) - endemic to Spain
- Corrosella valladolensis (Boeters, Callot-Girardi & Knebelsberger, 2015) - endemic to Spain
  - Corrosella valladolensis kahbei (Boeters, Callot-Girardi & Knebelsberger, 2015) - endemic to Spain
  - Corrosella valladolensis valladolensis (Boeters, Callot-Girardi & Knebelsberger, 2015) - endemic to Spain
- Deganta azarum (Boeters & Rolán, 1988) - endemic to Spain
- Diegus gasulli (Boeters, 1981) - endemic to Ibiza
- Ecrobia atuca (Boeters, 1988) - endemic to Mallorca and Menorca
- Ecrobia vitrea (Risso, 1826)
- Guadiella andalucensis (Boeters, 1983) - endemic to Spain
- Guadiella arconadae Boeters, 2003 - endemic to Spain
- Guadiella ballesterosi Alba, Tarruella, Prats, Corbella & Guillén, 2009 - endemic to Spain
- Guadiella pilelongata Quiñonero Salgado, Martín Álvarez, López Soriano & Rolán, 2018 - endemic to Spain
- Guadiella ramosae Boeters, 2003 - endemic to Spain
- Hadziella leonorae Rolán & Pardo, 2011 - endemic to Mallorca
- Hydrobia acuta (Draparnaud, 1805)
- Iberhoratia sanromae Talaván Serna & Talaván Gómez, 2019 - endemic to Spain
- Islamia archiducis Boeters & Beckmann, 2007 - endemic to Mallorca
- Islamia ateni (Boeters, 1969) - endemic to Spain
- Islamia ayalga Ruiz-Cobo, Alonso, Quiñonero-Salgado & Rolán, 2018 - endemic to Spain
- Islamia globulus (Bofill, 1909)
- Islamia henrici Arconada & Ramos, 2006 - endemic to Spain
  - Islamia henrici giennensis Arconada & Ramos, 2006 - endemic to Spain
  - Islamia henrici henrici Arconada & Ramos, 2006 - endemic to Spain
- Islamia lagari (Altimira, 1960) - endemic to Spain
- Islamia pallida Arconada & Ramos, 2006 - endemic to Spain
- Islamia pistrini Ruiz-Cobo, Alonso, Quiñonero-Salgado & Rolán, 2018 - endemic to Spain
- Islamia seniaensis Alonso, Talaván-Serna, Ruiz-Jarillo, Quiñonero-Salgado & Rolán, 2021 - endemic to Spain
- Josefus aitanica Arconada & Ramos, 2006 - endemic to Spain
- Mercuria balearica (Paladilhe, 1869) - probably endemic to Menorca and Ibiza
- Mercuria bayonnensis (Locard, 1894)
- Mercuria similis (Draparnaud, 1805)

Mercuria emiliana is regarded as a synonym

- Milesiana schuelei (Boeters, 1981) - endemic to Spain
- Navalis edetanus Talaván-Serna, Quiñonero‐Salgado, Alonso & Rolán, 2021 - endemic to Spain
- Navalis perforatus Quiñonero-Salgado & Rolán, 2017 - endemic to Spain
- Plesiella guipuzcoa Boeters, 2003 - endemic to Spain
- Plesiella navarrensis Boeters, 2003 - endemic to Spain
- Potamopyrgus antipodarum J.E. Gray, 1843 - introduced
- Pseudamnicola artanensis Altaba, 2007 - endemic to Mallorca
- Pseudamnicola beckmanni Glöer & Zettler, 2007 - endemic to Mallorca
- Pseudamnicola granjaensis Glöer & Zettler, 2007 - endemic to Mallorca
- Pseudamnicola meloussensis Altaba, 2007 - endemic to Menorca
- Pseudamnicola moussoni (Calcara, 1841)

Pseudamnicola spirata (Paladilhe, 1869) and Pseudamnicola subproducta (Paladilhe, 1869) are regarded as synonyms

- Salaeniella valdaligaensis Boeters, Quiñonero-Salgado & Ruiz-Cobo, 2019
- Spathogyna fezi Arconada & Ramos, 2002 - endemic to Spain
- Tarraconia gasulli (Boeters, 1981) - endemic to Spain
- Tarraconia rolani Ramos, Arconada & Moreno, 2000 - endemic to Spain

Moitessieriidae

- Baldufa fontinalis Alba, Tarruella, Prats, Guillén & Corbella, 2010 - endemic to Spain
- Bythiospeum gloriae Rolán & Martínez-Ortí, 2003 - endemic to Spain
- Moitessieria aurea Tarruella, Corbella, Prats, Guillén & Alba, 2012 - endemic to Spain
- Moitessieria barrinae Alba, Corbella, Prats, Tarruella & Guillén, 2007 - endemic to Spain
- Moitessieria canfalonensis Corbella, Bros, Guillén, Prats & Cadevall, 2020 - endemic to Spain
- Moitessieria collellensis Corbella, Alba, Tarruella, Prats & Guillén, 2006 - endemic to Spain
- Moitessieria dexteri Corbella, Guillén, Prats, Tarruella & Alba, 2012 - endemic to Spain
- Moitessieria foui Boeters, 2003 - endemic to Spain
- Moitessieria garrotxaensis Quiñonero-Salgado & Rolán, 2017 - endemic to Spain
- Moitessieria guadelopensis Boeters, 2003 - endemic to Spain
- Moitessieria hedraensis Quiñonero-Salgado & Rolán, 2017 - endemic to Spain
- Moitessieria lludrigaensis Boeters, 2003 - endemic to Spain
- Moitessieria meijersae Boeters, 2003 - endemic to Spain
- Moitessieria mugae Corbella, Alba, Tarruella, Prats & Guillén, 2006 - endemic to Spain
- Moitessieria notenboomi Boeters, 2003 - endemic to Spain
- Moitessieria olleri Altimira, 1960 - endemic to Spain
- Moitessieria pasterae Corbella, Alba, Tarruella, Guillén & Prats, 2009 - endemic to Spain
- Moitessieria pesanta Quiñonero-Salgado & Rolán, 2019 - endemic to Spain
- Moitessieria prioratensis Corbella, Alba, Tarruella, Guillén & Prats, 2009 - endemic to Spain
- Moitessieria punctata Alba, Tarruella, Prats, Guillén & Corbella, 2010 - endemic to Spain
- Moitessieria robresia Boeters, 2003 - endemic to Spain
- Moitessieria seminiana Boeters, 2003 - endemic to Spain
- Moitessieria servaini (Burguignat, 1880) - endemic to Spain
- Moitessieria tatirocae Tarruella, Corbella, Prats, Guillén & Alba, 2015 - endemic to Spain
- Palaospeum hispanicum Boeters, 2003 - endemic to Spain
  - Palaospeum hispanicum hispanicum Boeters, 2003
  - Palaospeum hispanicum ondaense Boeters, 2003
- Palaospeum lopezsorianoi Quiñonero-Salgado & Rolán, 2017 - endemic to Spain
- Palaospeum septentrionale (Rolán & Ramos, 1996) - endemic to Spain
- Sardopaladilhia buccina Rolán & Martínez-Ortí, 2003 - endemic to Spain
- Sardopaladilhia distorta Rolán & Martínez-Ortí, 2003 - endemic to Spain
- Sardopaladilhia marianae Rolán & Martínez-Ortí, 2003 - endemic to Spain
- Sardopaladilhia subdistorta Rolán & Martínez-Ortí, 2003 - endemic to Spain
- Spiralix affinitatis Boeters, 2003 - endemic to Spain
- Spiralix asturica Quiñonero-Salgado, Ruiz-Cobo & Rolán, 2017 - endemic to Spain
- Spiralix burgensis Boeters, 2003 - endemic to Spain
- Spiralix calida Corbella, Guillén, Prats, Tarruella & Alba, 2014- endemic to Spain
- Spiralix clarae Quiñonero-Salgado, Ruiz-Cobo & Rolán, 2017 - endemic to Spain
- Spiralix cubelli Quiñonero-Salgado, López-Soriano, Alonso & Rolán, 2020 - endemic to Spain
- Spiralix gusii Quiñonero-Salgado, López-Soriano, Alonso & Rolán, 2020 - endemic to Spain
- Spiralix heisenbergi Quiñonero-Salgado, Alonso & Rolán, 2021 - endemic to Spain
- Spiralix miraensis Quiñonero-Salgado, Ruiz-Cobo & Rolán, 2017 - endemic to Spain
- Spiralix pequenoensis Boeters, 2003 - endemic to Spain
- Spiralix tuba Quiñonero-Salgado, Alonso & Rolán, 2019 - endemic to Spain
- Spiralix valenciana Boeters, 2003 - endemic to Spain
  - Spiralix valenciana castellonica Boeters, 2003 - endemic to Spain
  - Spiralix valenciana valenciana Boeters, 2003 - endemic to Spain
- Spiralix vetusta Quiñonero-Salgado, Alonso & Rolán, 2018 - endemic to Spain
- Tarracospeum raveni Quiñonero‐Salgado, Ruiz-Jarillo, Alonso & Rolán, 2021 - endemic to Spain

Valvatidae

- Valvata cristata O. F. Müller, 1774
- Valvata piscinalis (O. F. Müller, 1774)

Acroloxidae

- Acroloxus lacustris (Linnaeus, 1758)

Lymnaeidae

- Austropepla viridis (Quoy & Gaimard, 1833) - introduced
- Galba cubensis (Pfeiffer, 1839) - introduced
- Galba trunculata (O. F. Müller, 1774)
- Radix auricularia (Linnaeus, 1758)
- Radix balthica (Linnaeus, 1758)
- Stagnicola fuscus (Pfeiffer, 1821)
- Stagnicola palustris (O. F. Müller, 1774)

Physidae

- Physella acuta (Draparnaud, 1805)

Planorbidae

- Ancylus fluviatilis O. F. Müller, 1774
- Anisus spirorbis (Linnaeus, 1758)
- Anisus leucostoma (Millet, 1813)
- Ferrissia fragilis
- Gyraulus albus (O. F. Müller, 1774)
- Gyraulus laevis (Alder, 1838)
- Gyraulus crista (Linnaeus, 1758)
- Gyraulus chinensis (Dunker, 1848) - introduced species
- Hippeutis complanatus (Linnaeus, 1758)
- Menetus dilatatus (A. Gould, 1841) - introduced species
- Planorbarius metidjensis
- Planorbella duryi (Wetherby, 1879) - introduced species
- Planorbis planorbis (Linnaeus, 1758)
- Planorbis carinatus O. F. Müller, 1774
- Segmentina nitida (O. F. Müller, 1774)

== Land gastropods ==
Cochlostomatidae

- Cochlostoma patulum fontqueri F. Haas, 1924 - endemic to Spain
- Obscurella asturica Raven, 1990 - endemic to Spain
- Obscurella bicostulata (Gofas, 1989) - endemic to Spain
- Obscurella crassilabra (Dupuy, 1849)
- Obscurella gigas (Gofas & Backeljau, 1994)
- Obscurella hidalgoi (Crosse, 1864)
- Obscurella martorelli (Bourguignat in Servain, 1880)
  - Obscurella martorelli esserana (Fagot, 1888) - endemic to Spain
  - Obscurella martorelli martorelli (Bourguignat in Servain, 1880)
  - Obscurella martorelli montsicciana (Bofill, 1890) - endemic to Spain
- Obscurella oscitans (Gofas, 1989) - endemic to Spain
- Obscurella partioti (Moquin-Tandon in Saint-Simon, 1848)

Pomatiidae

- Leonia mamillaris mamillaris (Lamarck, 1822)
- Pomatias elegans (O. F. Müller, 1774)
- Tudorella ferruginea (Lamarck 1822) - endemic to the Balearic Islands
- Tudorella mauretanica (Pallary 1898)

Carychiidae

- Iberozospeum bellesi (Gittenberger, 1973)
- Iberozospeum biscaiense (Gómez & Prieto, 1983) - endemic to Spain
- Iberozospeum costulatum Prieto & Jochum, 2021 - endemic to Spain
- Iberozospeum gittenbergeri (Jochum, Prieto & De Winter, 2019) - endemic to Spain
- Iberozospeum percostulatum (Alonso, Prieto, Quiñonero-Salgado & Rolán, 2018) - endemic to Spain
- Iberozospeum praetermissum (Jochum, Prieto & De Winter, 2019) - endemic to Spain
- Iberozospeum schaufussi (Frauenfeld, 1862) - endemic to Spain
- Iberozospeum suarezi (Gittenberger, 1980) - endemic to Spain
- Iberozospeum vasconicum (Prieto, De Winter, Weigand, Gómez & Jochum, 2015) - endemic to Spain
- Iberozospeum zaldivarae (Prieto, De Winter, Weigand, Gómez & Jochum, 2015) - endemic to Spain

Succineidae

- Oxyloma elegans (Risso, 1821)
- Oxyloma sarsii (Esmarck & Hoyer, 1886)
- Quickella arenaria (Potiez & Michaud, 1838)
- Succinea putris (Linnaeus, 1758)
- Succinea sp. - introduced species
- Succinella oblonga (Draparnaud, 1801)

Azecidae

- Azeca goodalli (Férussac, 1821)
- Cryptazeca elongata Gómez, 1990 - endemic to Spain
- Cryptazeca monodonta (De Folin & Bérillon, 1877) - endemic to Spain
- Cryptazeca spelaea Gómez, 1990
- Cryptazeca subcylindrica De Folin & Bérillon, 1877
- Hypnophila boissii (Dupuy, 1850)
- Hypnophila malagana E. Gittenberger & Menkhorst, 1983

Cochlicopidae

- Cochlicopa lubrica (O. F. Müller, 1774)
- Cochlicopa lubricella (Porro, 1838)

Lauriidae

- Lauria cylindracea (Da Costa, 1778)
- Leiostyla anglica (A. Férussac, 1821)

Orculidae

- Argna ferrari (Porro, 1838)
- Orculella aragonica (Westerlund, 1897) - endemic to Spain
- Sphyradium doliolum (Bruguière, 1792)

Valloniidae

- Acanthinula aculeata (O. F. Müller, 1774)
- Gittenbergía sororcula (Benoit, 1859)
- Spermodea lamellata (Jeffreys, 1830)
- Vallonia costata (O. F. Müller, 1774)
- Vallonia enniensis (Gredler, 1856)
- Vallonia excentrica Sterki, 1893
- Vallonia pulchella (O. F. Müller, 1774)

Pupillidae

- Pupilla muscorum (Linnaeus, 1758)
- Pupilla triplicata (Studer, 1820)

Pyramidulidae

- Pyramidula jaenensis (Clessin, 1882)
- Pyramidula pusilla (Vallot, 1801)
- Pyramidula rupestris (Draparnaud, 1801)
- Pyramidula umbilicata (Montagu, 1803)

Chondrinidae

- Abida attenuata (Fagot, 1886)
- Abida bigerrensis (Moquin-Tandon, 1856)
- Abida cylindrica (Michaud, 1829)
- Abida gittenbergeri Bössneck, 2000
- Abida occidentalis (Fagot, 1888)
- Abida partioti (Saint-Simon, 1848)
- Abida polyodon (Draparnaud, 1801)
- Abida pyrenaearia (Michaud, 1831)
- Abida secale (Draparnaud, 1801)
  - A. s. affinis (Rossmassler, 1839)
  - A. s. andorrensis (Bourguignat, 1863)
  - A. s. bofilli (Fagot, 1884) - endemic to Spain
  - A. s. brauniopsis Altimira, 1963 - endemic to Spain
  - A. s. brongersmai E. Gittenberger, 1973 - endemic to Spain
  - A. s. cadica (Westerlund, 1902) - endemic to Spain
  - A. s. cadiensis E. Gittenberger, 1973 - endemic to Spain
  - A. s. elegantissima E. Gittenberger, 1973 - endemic to Spain
  - A. s. ionicae Kokshoorn & Gittenberger, 2010 - endemic to Spain
  - A. s. lilietensis (Bofill, 1886) - endemic to Spain
  - A. s. margaridae Bech, 1993 - endemic to Spain
  - A. s. meridionalis Martínez-Ortí, Gómez & Faci, 2004 - endemic to Spain
  - A. s. merijni Kokshoorn & Gittenberger, 2010 - endemic to Spain
  - A. s. peteri Kokshoorn & Gittenberger, 2010 - endemic to Spain
  - A. s. secale
  - A. s. tuxensis (Westerlund, 1902) - endemic to Spain
  - A. s. vilellai Kokshoorn & Gittenberger, 2010 - endemic to Spain
- Abida vasconica (Kobelt, 1882) - endemic to Spain
- Abida vergniesiana (Küster, 1850)
- Chondrina aguilari Altimira, 1967 - endemic to Spain
- Chondrina altimirai E. Gittenmberger, 1973 - endemic to Spain
- Chondrina arigonis (Rossmässler, 1859) - endemic to Spain
- Chondrina arigonoides Kokshoorn & Gittenberger, 2010 - endemic to Spain
- Chondrina ascendens (Westerlund, 1878)
- Chondrina avenacea avenacea (Bruguière, 1792)
- Chondrina bigorriensis (Des Moulins, 1835)
- Chondrina calpica calpica (Westerlund, 1872)
- Chondrina cantabroccidentalis Somoza-Valdeolmillos & Vázquez-Sanz, 2021 - endemic to Spain
- Chondrina centralis (Fagot, 1892)
- Chondrina cliendentata E. Gittenberger, 1973 - endemic to Spain
- Chondrina dertosensis (Bofill, 1886) - endemic to Spain
- Chondrina farinesii (Des Moulins, 1835)
- Chondrina gasulli E. Gittenberger, 1973 - endemic to Spain
- Chondrina granatensis Alonso, 1974 - endemic to Spain
- Chondrina guiraoensis Pilsbry, 1918 - endemic to Spain
- Chondrina ingae Kokshoorn & Gittenberger, 2010 - endemic to Spain
- Chondrina jumillensis (L. Pfeiffer, 1853) - endemic to Spain
- Chondrina kobelti (Westerlund, 1887) - endemic to Spain
  - Chondrina kobelti kobelti (Westerlund, 1887) - endemic to Spain
  - Chondrina kobelti ordunensis Pilsbry, 1918 - endemic to Spain
- Chondrina kobeltoides E. Gittenberger, 1973 - endemic to Spain
- Chondrina maginensis Arrébola & Gómez, 1998 - endemic to Spain
- Chondrina marjae Kokshoorn & Gittenberger, 2010 - endemic to Spain
- Chondrina massotiana (Bourguignat, 1863)
  - Chondrina massotiana massotiana (Bourguignat, 1863)
  - Chondrina massotiana sexplicata (Bofill, 1886) - endemic to Spain
- Chondrina pseudavenacea Kokshoorn & Gittenberger, 2010 - endemic to Spain
- Chondrina ripkeni E. Gittenberger, 1973 - endemic to Spain
- Chondrina soleri Altimira, 1960 - endemic to Spain
- Chondrina tenuimarginata (Des Moulins, 1835)
- Granaria brauni (Rossmassler, 1842)
  - Granaria brauni brauni (Rossmassler, 1842)
  - Granaria brauni markusi Gittenberger & Ripken, 1993 - endemic to Spain
- Granaria variabilis (Draparnaud, 1801)
- Granopupa granum (Draparnaud, 1801)
- Rupestrella dupotetii (Terver, 1839)
- Rupestrella philippii (Cantraine, 1840) - Balearic Islands
- Solatopupa similis (Bruguière, 1792)

Truncatellinidae

- Columella aspera Waldén, 1966
- Columella edentula (Draparnaud, 1805)
- Truncatellina beckmanni Quintana, 2010
- Truncatellina callicatris (Scacchi, 1833)
- Truncatellina claustralis (Gredler, 1856)

Vertiginidae

- Vertigo angustior Jeffreys 1830
- Vertigo antivertigo (Draparnaud 1801)
- Vertigo arctica (Wallenberg, 1858)
- Vertigo genesii (Gredler, 1856)
- Vertigo moulinsiana (Dupuy 1849)
- Vertigo pusilla O. F. Müller, 1774
- Vertigo pygmaea (Draparnaud, 1801)
- Vertigo substriata (Jeffreys, 1833)

Enidae

- Ena montana (Draparnaud, 1801)
- Jaminia quadridens (O. F. Müller, 1774)
- Mastus pupa (Linnaeus, 1758)
- Merdigera obscura (O.F. Müller, 1774)
- Zebrina detrita (O. F. Müller, 1774)

Bulimulidae

- Naesiotus quitensis (Pfeiffer, 1848) - introduced

Clausiliidae

- Balea heydeni Maltzan, 1881
- Balea perversa (Linnaeus, 1758)
- Bofilliella subarcuata (Bofill, 1897)
- Clausilia bidentata (Strøm, 1765)
  - Clausilia bidentata abietana Dupuy, 1849
  - Clausilia bidentata bidentata (Strøm, 1765)
- Clausilia dubia dubia Draparnaud, 1805
- Clausilia rugosa Draparnaud, 1801
  - Clausilia rugosa magdalenica Salvañá, 1887 - endemic to Spain
  - Clausilia rugosa parvulo (A. Férussac, 1807)
  - Clausilia rugosa penchinati Bourguignat, 1876
  - Clausilia rugosa reboudii Dupuy, 1850
- Cochlodina laminata (Montagu, 1803)
- Macrogastra attenuata lineolata (Held, 1836)
- Macrogastra plicatula (Draparnaud, 1801)
- Macrogastra rolphii (Turton, 1826)
  - Macrogastra rolphii digonostoma (Bourguignat, 1877)
  - Macrogastra rolphii rolphii (Turton, 1826)
- Macrogastra ventricosa (Draparnaud, 1801)
- Neniatlanta pauli (J. Mabille 1865)
- Papillifera bidens (Linnaeus, 1758)

Ferussaciidae

- Cecilioides acicula (O.F Müller, 1774)
- Cecilioides connollyi Tomlin, 1943 - endemic to Gibraltar
- Cecilioides raphidia (Bourguignat, 1856)
- Cecilioides tumulorum (Bourguignat, 1856)
- Cecilioides veneta (Strobel, 1855)
- Coilostele akus Servain, 1880 - endemic to Spain
- Hohenwartiana disparata (Westerlund, 1891) - endemic to Spain
- Ferussacia folliculum (Schröter, 1784)

Achatinidae

- Rumina decollata (Linnaeus, 1758)
- Rumina saharica Pallary, 1901

Testacellidae

- Testacella haliotidea Lamarck, 1801
- Testacella maugei A. Férussac, 1819
- Testacella scutulum G.B. Sowerby I, 1821

Papillodermatidae

- Papilloderma altonagai Wiktor, Martín & Castillejo, 1990 - endemic to Spain

Punctidae

- Punctum pygmaeum (Draparnaud, 1801)
- Paralaoma servilis (Shuttleworth, 1852)

Helicodiscidae

- Lucillo singleyana (Pilsbry, 1890)

Discidae

- Discus ruderatus (W. Hartmann, 1821)
- Discus rotundatus (O.F. Müller, 1774)

Gastrodontidae

- Aegopinella epipedostoma (Fagot, 1879)
- Aegopinella minor (Stabile, 1864)
- Aegopinella nitidula (Draparnaud, 1805)
- Aegopinella pura (Alder, 1830)
- Retinella incerta (Draparnaud, 1805)
- Perpolita hammonis (Strøm, 1765)
- Zonitoides arboreus (Say, 1816) - introduced
- Zonitoides excavatus (Alder, 1830)
- Zonitoides jaccetanicus (Bourguignat, 1870) - endemic to Spain
- Zonitoides nitidus (O.F. Müller, 1774)

Oxychilidae

- Oxychilus alliarius (J .S. Miller, 1822)
- Oxychilus altimirai Riedel, 1972 - endemic to Spain
- Oxychilus anjana Altonaga, 1986 - endemic to Spain
- Oxychilus aracenensis Holyoak & Martín, 2022 - endemic to Spain
- Oxychilus basajauna Altonaga, 1990 - endemic to Spain
- Oxychilus beckmanni Falkner, 2007 - endemic to Mallorca
- Oxychilus cellarius (O.F. Müller, 1774)
- Oxychilus clarus (Held, 1838)
- Oxychilus courquini (Bourguignat, 1870) - endemic to Spain
- Oxychilus draparnaudi (H. Beck, 1837)
- Oxychilus lentiformis (Kobelt, 1882) - endemic to the Balearic Islands
- Oxychilus mercadali Gasull, 1968 - endemic to Spain
- Oxychilus navarricus (Bourguignat, 1870)
- Oxychilus pityusanus Riedel, 1969 - endemic to Ibiza and Formentera
- Oxychilus rateranus (Sevain, 1880) - endemic to Spain
- Morlina glabra harlei (Fagot, 1884)
- Mediterranea hydatina (Rossmassler, 1838)

Pristilomatidae

- Hawaiia minuscula (Binney, 1841) - introduced
- Vitrea contracta (Westerlund, 1871)
- Vitrea gasulli Riedel & Paul, 1978 - endemic to Mallorca and Ibiza
- Vitrea inae De Winter & Ripken, 1991 - endemic to Spain
- Vitrea striata Norris, Paul & Riedel, 1988 - endemic to Ibiza
- Vitrea subrimata (Reinhardt, 1871)

Euconulidae

- Euconulus alderi (Gray, 1840)
- Euconulus fulvus (O.F. Müller, 1774)

Milacidae

- Milax gagates (Draparnaud, 1801)
- Milax nigricans (Schultz in Philippi, 1836)
- Tandonia sowerbyi (A. Férussac, 1823)

Parmacellidae

- Drusia valenciennii (Webb & Van Beneden, 1836)

Agriolimacidae

- Deroceras agreste (Linnaeus, 1758)
- Deroceras altimirai Altena, 1969
- Deroceras ercinae De Winter, 1985 - endemic to Spain
- Deroceras hispaniensis Castillejo & Wiktor, 1983
- Deroceras invadens Reise, Hutchinson, Schunack & Schlitt, 2011
- Deroceras laeve (O.F. Müller, 1774)
- Deroceras levisarcobelum De Winter, 1986
- Deroceras lombricoides (Morelet, 1845)
- Deroceras nitidum (Morelet, 1845)
- Deroceras ponsonbyi (P. Hesse, 1884)
- Deroceras reticulatum (O.F. Müller, 1774)
- Deroceras rodnae Grossu & Lupu, 1965
- Deroceras tarracense Altena, 1969 - endemic to Spain
- Deroceras vascoana De Winter, 1986
- Furcopenis circularis Castillejo & Mascato, 1987
- Furcopenis darioi Castillejo & Wiktor, 1983 - endemic to Spain
- Furcopenis gallaeciensis Castillejo & Wiktor, 1983 - endemic to Spain
- Furcopenis geresiensis (Rodríguez, Castillejo & Outeiro, 1989)

Limacidae

- Ambigolimax valentianus (A. Férussac, 1821)
- Gigantomilax majoricensis (Heynemann, 1863) - endemic to Mallorca and Menorca
- Limax cinereoniger Wolf, 1803
- Limax maximus Linnaeus, 1758
- Limacus flavus (Linnaeus, 1758)
- Malacolimax tenellus (O.F. Müller, 1774)
- Lehmannia marginata (O.F. Müller, 1774)
- Lehmannia rupicola Lessona & Pollonera, 1882

Vitrinidae

- Phenacolimax major (A. Férussac, 1807)
- Oligolimax annularis (S. Studer, 1820)
- Semilimax pyrenaicus (A. Férussac, 1821)
- Vitrina pellucida (O.F. Müller, 1774)

Arionidae

- Arion anthracius Bourguignat, 1886
- Arion baeticus Garrido, Castillejo & Iglesias, 1994 - endemic to Spain
- Arion fagophilus De Winter, 1986
- Arion flagellus Collinge, 1893
- Arion fuligineus Morelet, 1854
- Arion gilvus Torres Mínguez, 1925 - endemic to Spain
- Arion hispanicus Simroth, 1886
- Arion hortensis A. Férussac, 1819
- Arion intermedius Normand, 1852
- Arion iratii Garrido, Castillejo & Iglesias, 1995 - endemic to Spain
- Arion lizarrustii Garrido, Castillejo & Iglesias, 1995 - endemic to Spain
- Arion molinae Garrido, Castillejo & Iglesias, 1995
- Arion nobrei Pollonera, 1889
- Arion paularensis Wiktor & Parejo, 1989 - endemic to Spain
- Arion ponsi Quintana, 2007 - endemic to Menorca
- Arion rufus (Linnaeus, 1758)
- Arion subfuscus (Draparnaud, 1805)
- Arion urbiae De Winter, 1986 - endemic to Spain
- Arion wiktori Parejo & Martín, 1990 - endemic to Spain
- Geomalacus anguiformis (Morelet, 1845)
- Geomalacus maculosus Allman, 1843
- Geomalacus malagensis Wiktor & Norris, 1991
  - sometimes regarded as identical with Letourneuxia moreleti (Hesse, 1884)
- Geomalacus oliveirae Simroth, 1891

Canariellidae

- Montserratina bofilliana (Fagot, 1884) - endemic to Spain
- Montserratina martorelli (Bourguignat, 1870) - endemic to Spain

Elonidae

- Elona quimperiana (Férussac, 1822)
- Norelona pyrenaica (Draparnaud, 1805)

Geomitridae

- Backeljaia camporroblensis (Fez, 1944) - endemic to Spain
- Backeljaia corbellai (Martínez-Ortí, 2011) - endemic to Spain
- Backeljaia gigaxii (Pfeiffer, 1847)
- Backeljaia najerensis (Ortiz de Zárate y López, 1950) - endemic to Spain
- Cernuella aginnica (Locard, 1894)
- Cernuella neglecta (Draparnaud, 1805)
- Cernuella virgata (Da Costa, 1778)
- Cochlicella acuta (O. F. Müller, 1774)
- Cochlicella barbara (Linnaeus, 1758)
- Cochlicella conoidea (Draparnaud, 1801)
- Helicella cistorum (Morelet, 1845)
- Helicella iberica (Rambur, 1869) - endemic to Spain
- Helicella itala (Linnaeus, 1758)
- Helicella ordunensis (Kobelt, 1883) - endemic to Spain
- Helicella orzai Gittenberger & Manga, 1981 - endemic to Spain
- Helicella stiparium (Rossmässler, 1854) - endemic to Spain
- Helicella striatitalla Prieto, 1985 - endemic to Spain
- Helicella valdeona Gittenberger & Manga, 1977 - endemic to Spain
- Microxeromagna lowei (Potiez & Michaud, 1838)
- Plentuisa vendia Puente & Prieto, 1992 - endemic to Spain
- Ponentina martigena (Férussac, 1832) - endemic to Spain
- Ponentina octoglandulosa Holyoak & Holyoak, 2012
- Ponentina papillosa Holyoak & Holyoak, 2012
- Ponentina revelata (Michaud, 1831)
- Trochoidea elegans (Gmelin, 1791)
- Trochoidea pyramidata (Draparnaud, 1805)
- Trochoidea trochoides (Poiret, 1789)
- Xeroplexa intersecta (Poiret, 1801)
- Xerocrassa barceloi (Hidalgo, 1878) - endemic to Spain
- Xerocrassa caroli (Dohrn & Heynemann, 1862) - endemic to Ibiza
  - Xerocrassa caroli alegriae Schröder, 1984 - endemic to islets off Ibiza
  - Xerocrassa caroli caroli (Dohrn & Heynemann, 1862) - endemic to Ibiza
  - Xerocrassa caroli conjungens (Jaeckel, 1952) - endemic to an islet off Ibiza
  - Xerocrassa caroli espartariensis Schröder, 1984 - endemic to islets off Ibiza
  - Xerocrassa caroli jaeckeli (Altimira, 1965) - endemic to an islet off Ibiza
  - Xerocrassa caroli scopulicola (Bofill i Poch & Aguilar-Amat, 1924) - endemic to islets off Ibiza
  - Xerocrassa caroli vedrae (Jaeckel, 1952) - endemic to an islet off Ibiza
  - Xerocrassa caroli vedranellensis (Jaeckel, 1952) - endemic to an islet off Ibiza
- Xerocrassa chiae (Fagot, 1886) - endemic to Spain
- Xerocrassa cisternasi (Hidalgo, 1883) - endemic to Ibiza
  - Xerocrassa cisternasi calasaladae (Jaeckel, 1952) - endemic to an islet off Ibiza
  - Xerocrassa cisternasi calderensis (Gasull, 1964) - endemic to an islet off Ibiza
  - Xerocrassa cisternasi canae (Jaeckel, 1952) - endemic to an islet off Ibiza
  - Xerocrassa cisternasi cisternasi (Hidalgo, 1883) - endemic to an islet off Ibiza
  - Xerocrassa cisternasi hortae (Schröder, 1978) - endemic to an islet off Ibiza
  - Xerocrassa cisternasi margaritae (Jaeckel, 1952) - endemic to islets off Ibiza
  - Xerocrassa cisternasi mesquidae (Schröder, 1978) - endemic to an islet off Ibiza
  - Xerocrassa cisternasi muradae (Jaeckel, 1952) - endemic to an islet off Ibiza
  - Xerocrassa cisternasi ortizi (Gasull, 1964) - endemic to Ibiza
  - Xerocrassa cisternasi redonae (Jaeckel, 1952) - endemic to an islet off Ibiza
- Xerocrassa claudinae (Gasull, 1964) - endemic to Mallorca
- Xerocrassa cobosi (Ortiz de Zárate López, 1962) - endemic to Spain
- Xerocrassa derogata (L. Pfeiffer, 1859) - endemic to Spain
- Xerocrassa ebusitana (Hidalgo, 1869) - endemic to Ibiza and Formentera
- Xerocrassa edmundi Martínez-Ortí, 2006 - endemic to Spain
- Xerocrassa formenterensis Schröder, 1984
- Xerocrassa frater (Dohrn & Heynemann, 1862) - endemic to Mallorca

Xerocrassa frater pollenzensis (Hidalgo, 1878) and Xerocrassa frater pulaensis Beckmann, 2007 are regarded as synonyms

- Xerocrassa geyeri (Soós, 1926)
- Xerocrassa grata (F. Haas, 1924) - endemic to Spain
- Xerocrassa homeyeri (Dohrn & Heynemann, 1862) - endemic to Mallorca
  - Xerocrassa homeyeri homeyeri (Dohrn & Heynemann, 1862) - endemic to Mallorca

Xerocrassa prietoi (Hidalgo, 1878) and Xerocrassa prietoi muroensis Graack, 2005 are regarded as synonyms

- Xerocrassa homeyeri ferrutxensis Forés & Altaba, 2014 - endemic to Mallorca
- Xerocrassa homeyeri ponsi (Higalgo, 1878) - endemic to Cabrera south of Mallorca

- Xerocrassa jimenensis Punte & Arrébola, 1996 - endemic to Spain
- Xerocrassa lacipensis Torres Alba & Quintana Cardona, 2021 - endemic to Spain
- Xerocrassa molinae (Hidalgo, 1883) - endemic to the Columbretes Islands
- Xerocrassa montserratensis (Hidalgo, 1870) - endemic to Spain

Xerocrassa montserratensis betulonensis (Bofill, 1879) and Xerocrassa montserratensis delicatula (Bofill, 1898) were regarded as synonyms, but are genetically distinct and might represent subspecies

- Xerocrassa newka (Dohrn & Heynemann, 1862) - endemic to Mallorca

Xerocrassa ferreri (S.H.F. Jaeckel, 1952) and Xerocrassa ferreri pobrensis (Gasull, 1964) are regarded as synonyms

- Xerocrassa nyeli (Mittre, 1842) - endemic to Menorca

Xerocrassa cardonae (Hidalgo, 1867) is regarded as a synonym

- Xerocrassa penchinati (Bourguignat, 1868) - endemic to Spain
- Xerocrassa pollenzensis (Hidalgo, 1878) - endemic to Mallorca
- Xerocrassa ripacurcica (Bofill, 1886) - endemic to Spain
  - Xerocrassa ripacurcica montsicciana (Bofill, 1890) - endemic to Spain
  - Xerocrassa ripacurcica oreina (Fagot, 1888)
  - Xerocrassa ripacurcica ripacurcica (Bofill, 1886) - endemic to Spain
- Xerocrassa roblesi Martnez-Ortí, 2000 - endemic to Spain
- Xerocrassa subrogata (L. Pfeiffer, 1853) - endemic to Spain
- Xerocrassa turolensis (Ortiz de Zárate López, 1963) - endemic to Spain
- Xerocrassa zaharensis (Puente & Arrébola, 1996) - endemic to Spain
- Xeroplexa setubalensis (L. Pfeiffer, 1850) - endemic to Spain
- Xerosecta adolfi (Pfeiffer, 1854) - endemic to Spain
- Xerosecta cespitum arigonis (Schmidt, 1853)
- Xerosecta explanata (O.F. Müller, 1774)
- Xeosecta promissa (Westerlund, 1892)
- Xerosecta reboudiana (Bourguignat, 1863)
- Xerotricha apicina (Lamarck, 1822)
- Xerotricha bierzona (Gittenberger & Manga, 1977) - endemic to Spain
- Xerotricha conspurcata (Draparnaud, 1801)
- Xerotricha corderoi (Gittenberger & Manga, 1977) - endemic to Spain
- Xerotricha gasulli (Ortiz de Zárate y López, 1950) - endemic to Spain
- Xerotricha gonzalezi (Azpeitia Moros, 1925) - endemic to Spain
- Xerotricha huidobroi (Azpeitia Moros, 1925) - endemic to Spain
- Xerotricha jamuzensis (Gittenberger & Manga, 1977)
- Xerotricha madritensis (Rambur, 1868)
- Xerotricha silosensis (Ortiz de Zárate y López, 1950) - endemic to Spain
- Xerotricha zaratei (Gittenberger & Manga, 1977) - endemic to Spain
- Xerotricha zujarensis (Ortiz de Zárate y López, 1950) - endemic to Spain
- Xerotricha vatonniana (Bourguignat, 1867)
- Zarateana arganica (Servain, 1880) - endemic to Spain
- Zarateana rocandioi (Ortiz de Zárate y López, 1950) - endemic to Spain

Helicodontidae

- Atenia quadrasi (Hidalgo, 1885)
- Helicodonta obvoluta (O. F. Müller, 1774)

Helicidae

- Allognathus graellsianus (Pfeiffer, 1848)
- Allognathus hispanicus (Rossmässler, 1838)
- Allognathus campanyonii (Rossmässler, 1839)
- Arianta xatartii (Farines, 1834)
- Cepaea hortensis (O. F. Müller, 1774)
- Cepaea nemoralis (Linnaeus, 1758)
- Cornu aspersum (O. F. Müller, 1774)
- Iberus alonensis (Férussac, 1821)
- Iberus campesinus (Pfeiffer, 1846)
- Otala lactea (O. F. Müller, 1774)
- Otala punctata (O. F. Müller, 1774)
- Pseudotachea litturata (Pfeiffer, 1851)
- Pseudotachea splendida (Draparnaud, 1801)
- Theba andalusica Gittenberger & Ripken, 1987
- Theba pisana (O. F. Müller, 1774)

Hygromiidae

- Ashfordia granulata (Alder, 1830)
- Ciliella ciliata (Hartmann, 1821)
- Cryptosaccus asturiensis Prieto & Puente, 1994 - endemic to Spain
- Cryptosaccus cabrerensis Holyoak & Holyoak, 2014 - endemic to Spain
- Euomphalía strigella ruscinica (Bourguignat, 1881)
- Hygromia cinctella (Draparnaud, 1801)
- Hygromia limbata (Draparnaud, 1805)
- Hygromia tassyi (Bourguignat, 1884)
- Ganula gadirana Muñoz, Almodóvar & Arrébola, 1999 - endemic to Spain
- Ganula lanuginosa (Boissy, 1835)
- Mengoana jeschaui (Ortiz de Zárate, 1949) - endemic to Spain
- Monacha atacis Gittenberger & De Winter, 1985
- Monacha cantiana (Montagu, 1803)
- Monacha cantiana (Montagu, 1803)
- Portugala inchoata (Morelet, 1845)
- Pyrenaearia cantabrica (Hidalgo, 1873) - endemic to Spain
- Pyrenaearia carascalensis (Michaud, 1831)
- Pyrenaearia carascalopsis (Fagot, 1884)
- Pyrenaearia cotiellae (Fagot, 1906) - endemic to Spain
- Pyrenaearia daanidentata Raven, 1988 - endemic to Spain
- Pyrenaearia molae Haas, 1924 - endemic to Spain
- Pyrenaearia navasi (Fagot, 1907) - endemic to Spain
- Pyrenaearia oberthuri (Ancey, 1884) - endemic to Spain
- Pyrenaearia organiaca (Fagot, 1905) - endemic to Spain
- Pyrenaearia parva Ortiz de Zárate, 1956 - endemic to Spain
- Pyrenaearia velascoi (Hidalgo, 1867) - endemic to Spain
- Trochulus hispidus (Linnaeus, 1758)
- Zenobiellina graminicola D.T. Holyoak & G.A. Holyoak, 2018 - endemic to Spain
- Zenobiellina subrufescens (J. S. Miller, 1822)

Polygyridae

- Polygyra cereolus (Mühlfeldt, 1816) - introduced

Sphincterochilidae

- Sphincterochila baetica (Rossmässler, 1854)
- Sphincterochila candidissima (Draparnaud, 1801)
- Sphincterochila cariosula (Michaud, 1833)
  - Sphincterochila cariosula cariosula (Michaud, 1833)
  - Sphincterochila cariosula hispanica (Westerlund, 1886) - endemic to Spain

Trissexodontidae

- Caracollina lenticula (Ferussac, 1821)
- Gasullia gasulli (Ortiz de Zárate Rocandio & Ortiz de Zárate López, 1961) - endemic to Spain
- Gasuliella simplicula (Morelet, 1845)
- Hatumia cobosi (Ortiz de Zárate López, 1962) - endemic to Spain
- Hatumia zapateri (Hidalgo, 1870) - endemic to Spain
- Mastigophallus rangianus (Michaud, 1831)
- Oestophora barbella (Servain, 1880)
- Oestophora calpeana (Morelet, 1854)
- Oestophora dorotheae P. Hesse, 1930
- Oestophora ebria (Corbellá, 2004) - endemic to Spain
- Oestophora granesae Arrébola, 1998 - endemic to Spain
- Oestophora lusitanica (L. Pfeiffer, 1841)
- Oestophora mariae Ruiz, Arrébola & Puente, 2009 - endemic to Spain
- Oestophora ortizi De Winter & Ripken, 1991 - endemic to Spain
- Oestophora prietoi Ruiz, Arrébola & Puente, 2009 - endemic to Spain
- Oestophora silvae Ortiz de Zárate, 1962
- Oestophora tarnieri (Morelet, 1854)
- Oestophora urbionensis Prieto & Arribas, 2020 - endemic to Spain
- Oestophorella buvinieri (Michaud, 1841) - endemic to Spain
- Suboestophora altamirai (Ortiz de Zárate, 1962) - endemic to Spain
- Suboestophora boscae (Hidalgo, 1869) - endemic to Spain
- Suboestophora hispanica (Gude, 1910) - endemic to Spain
- Suboestophora jeresae (Ortiz de Zárate, 1962) - endemic to Spain
- Suboestophora tarraconensis (Aguilar-Amat, 1935) - endemic to Spain
- Trissexodon constrictus (Boubée, 1836)

== Freshwater bivalves ==
Corbiculidae

- Corbicula fluminea (O. F. Müller, 1774) - invasive species

Margaritiferidae

- Margaritifera margaritifera (Linnaeus, 1758)
- Pseudunio auricularius (Spengler, 1793)

Unionidae

- Anodonta anatina (Linnaeus, 1758)
- Potomida littoralis (Cuvier, 1798)
- Sinanodonta woodiana (I. Lea, 1834) - invasive species
- Unio delphinus Spengler, 1793
- Unio gibbus Spengler, 1793
- Unio mancus Lamarck, 1819
- Unio ravoisieri Deshayes, 1848
- Unio tumidiformis Castro, 1885

Sphaeriidae

- Musculium lacustre (O. F. Müller, 1774)
- Sphaerium corneum (Linnaeus, 1758)
- Pisidium casertanum (Poli, 1791)
- Pisidium personatum Malm, 1855
- Pisidium amnicum (O. F. Müller, 1774)
- Pisidium henslowanum (Pfeiffer, 1821)
- Pisidium lilljeborgii Clessin, 1886
- Pisidium hibernicum Westerlund, 1894
- Pisidium milium Held, 1836
- Pisidium nitidum Jenyns, 1832
- Pisidium subtruncatum Malm, 1855

Dreissenidae

- Dreissena polymorpha Pallas, 1771 invasive species

== See also ==
- List of non-marine molluscs of the Canary Islands

Lists of molluscs of surrounding countries:

- List of non-marine molluscs of France
- List of non-marine molluscs of Andorra
- List of non-marine molluscs of Portugal
- List of non-marine molluscs of Morocco
