= List of non-marine molluscs of Metropolitan France =

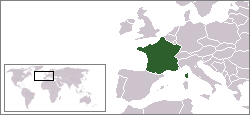
Location of France

The non-marine molluscs of France are a part of the molluscan fauna of Metropolitan France (including Corsica).

There are 695 species of non-marine molluscs living in the wild in continental France.

Summary table of number of species:
Numbers of molluscs by habitat	Number of species
Freshwater gastropods	??
Land gastropods	??
Total number of non-marine gastropods	??
Freshwater bivalves	??
Total number of non-marine molluscs	695 in continental France

== Freshwater gastropods ==
Hydrobiidae

- Arganiella exilis
- Belgrandia varica (J. Paget, 1854) – It was endemic to France, but it is extinct.
- Belgrandiella pyrenaica
- Bythiospeum articense
- Bythiospeum bourguignati
- Bythiospeum bressanum
- Bythiospeum garnieri
- Fissuria boui
- Litthabitella elliptica
- Palacanthilhiopsis vervierii

Lithoglyphidae

- Lithoglyphus naticoides

Moitessieriidae

- Moitessieria corsica
- Moitessieria juvenisanguis
- Moitessieria lineolata
- Moitessieria locardi
- Moitessieria rolandiana
- Paladilhia pleurotoma
- Plagigeyeria conilis
- Pseudamnicola anteisensis
- Pseudamnicola klemmi
- Spiralix rayi (Locard, 1882)

Amnicolidae

- Bythinella bouloti Girardi, Bichain & Wienin, 2002
- Bythinella galerae Girardi, Bichain & Wienin, 2002

== Land gastropods ==
Aciculidae

- Renea gormonti
- Renea moutonii
- Renea paillona
- Renea singularis

Chondrinidae

- Abida ateni
- Abida attenuata
- Abida bigerrensis
- Abida cylindrica
- Abida gittenbergeri
- Abida occidentalis
- Abida partioti
- Abida polyodon
- Abida pyrenaearia
- Abida vergniesiana

Cochlicopidae

- Cryptazeca subcylindrica
- Hypnophila remyi

Vertiginidae

- Truncatellina arcyensis

Pristilomatidae

- Vitrea pseudotrolli

Parmacellidae

- Parmacella gervaisii Moquin-Tandon, 1850 – It was endemic to France, but it is extinct.

Helicidae

- Cyrnotheba corsica
- Tacheocampylaea raspaili
- Tyrrhenaria ceratina – in Corsica
- Helix melanostoma Draparnaud, 1801

== Freshwater bivalves ==
Unionidae

- Unio turtoni

== Hothouse aliens ==
"Hothouse aliens" in France include:

== See also ==
- Fauna of Metropolitan France

=== French Overseas territories ===
- List of non-marine molluscs of French Guiana
- List of non-marine molluscs of French Polynesia
- List of non-marine molluscs of Martinique
- List of non-marine molluscs of Réunion
- List of non-marine molluscs of Guadeloupe
- List of non-marine molluscs of Mayotte

=== Surrounding countries ===
- List of non-marine molluscs of Belgium
- List of non-marine molluscs of Luxembourg
- List of non-marine molluscs of Germany
- List of non-marine molluscs of Switzerland
- List of non-marine molluscs of Italy
- List of non-marine molluscs of Monaco
- List of non-marine molluscs of Andorra
- List of non-marine molluscs of Spain
- List of non-marine molluscs of Great Britain
