= List of non-marine molluscs of Andorra =

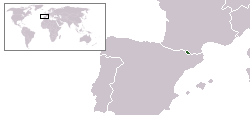
Location of Andorra

The non-marine molluscs of Andorra are a part of the fauna of Andorra. That country is land-locked and therefore it has no marine molluscs, only land and freshwater species, including snails, slugs and freshwater bivalves.

== Land gastropods ==
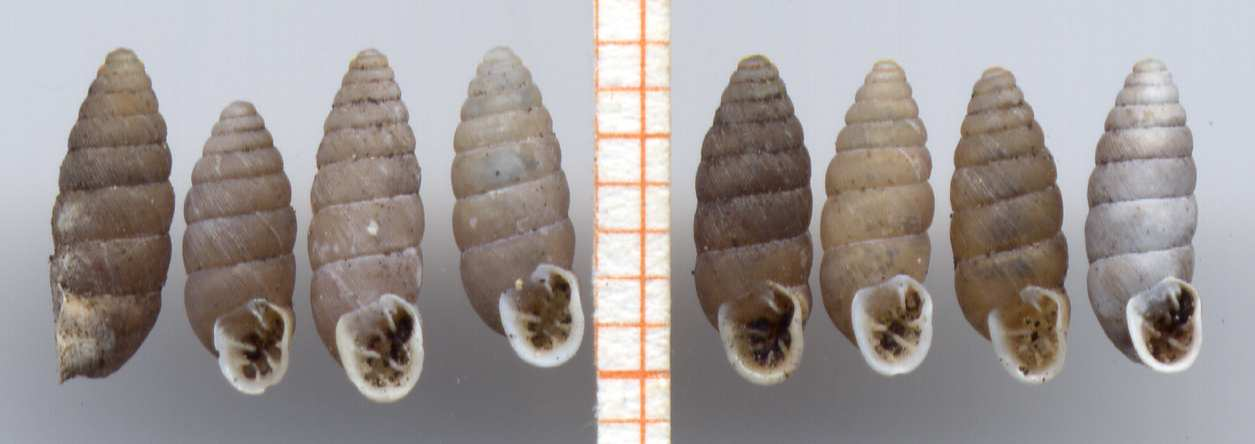
Eight shells of Abida secale, the scale bar is in mm

Chondrinidae

- Abida occidentalis (Fagot, 1888)
- Abida polyodon (Draparnaud, 1801)
- Abida secale (Draparnaud, 1801) - the subspecies Abida secale andorrensis (Bourguignat, 1863) is native to Andorra and surrounding Spain.
- Abida vergniesiana (Küster, 1847)

Agriolimacidae

- Deroceras laeve (Müller, 1774)
- Deroceras agreste (Linnaeus, 1758)
- Deroceras reticulatum (Müller, 1774)
- Deroceras altimirai Altena, 1969
- Deroceras levisarcobelum de Winter, 1986
- Deroceras rodnae Grossu et Lupu, 1965

Limacidae

- Malacolimax tenellus (Müller, 1774)
- Lehmannia marginata (Müller, 1774)
- Lehmannia valentiana (Férussac, 1821)
- Limax maximus Linnaeus, 1758

Boettgerillidae

- Boettgerilla pallens Simroth, 1912

Arionidae

- Arion lusitanicus Mabille, 1868
- Arion subfuscus (Draparnaud, 1805)
- Arion hortensis Férussac, 1819
- Arion intermedius (Normand, 1852)

Hygromiidae

- Hygromia golasi Prieto & Puente, 1992 - endemic

== See also ==
- List of non-marine molluscs of France
- List of non-marine molluscs of Spain
