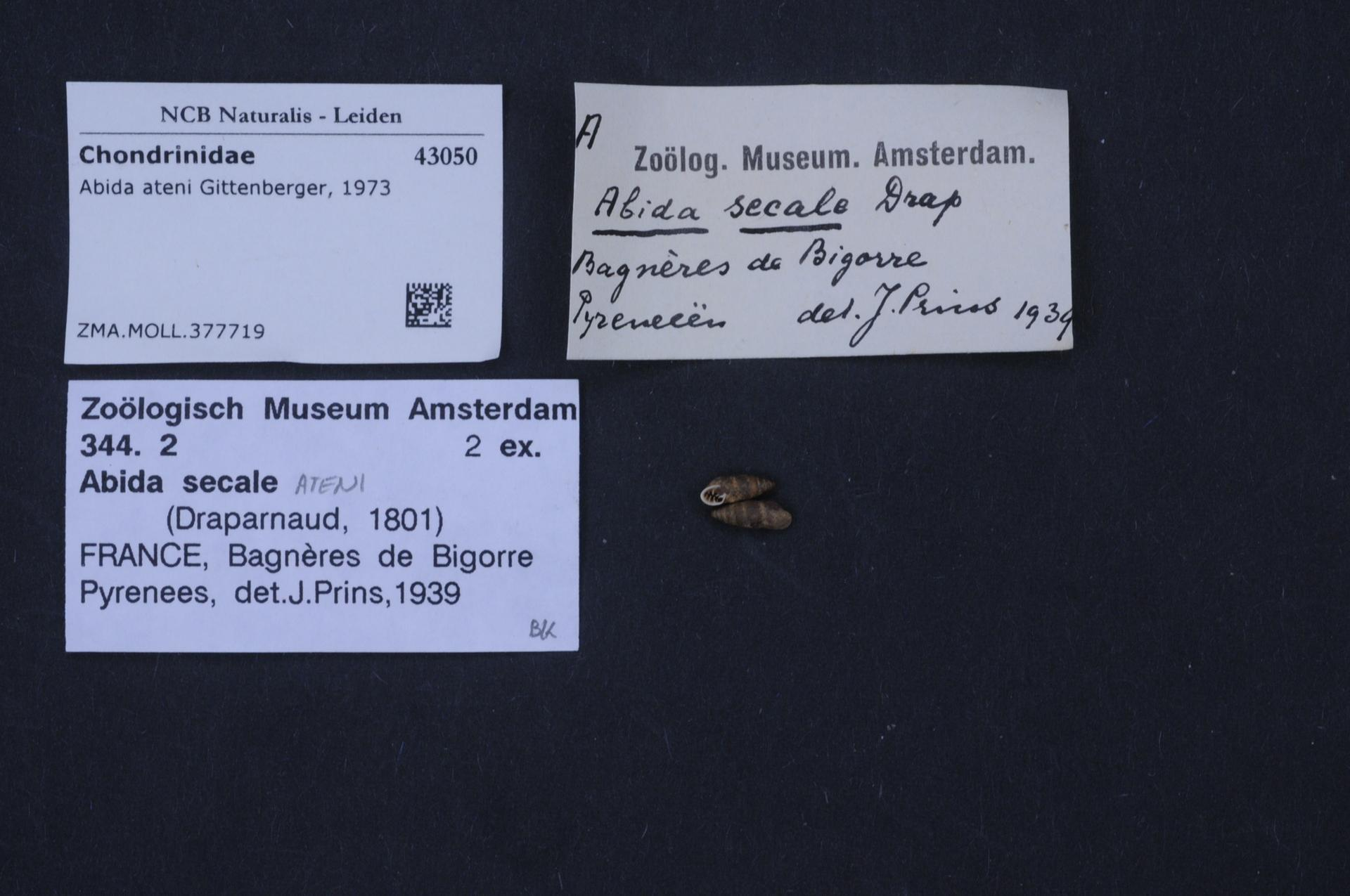
- Preserved shell

Conservation status
- Vulnerable (IUCN 3.1)

Scientific classification
- Kingdom: Animalia
- Phylum: Mollusca
- Class: Gastropoda
- Order: Stylommatophora
- Family: Chondrinidae
- Genus: Abida
- Species: A. ateni

Binomial name
- Abida ateni E. Gittenberger, 1973

Synonyms
- Abida secale ateni (Draparnaud, 1801); Abida secale ateni E. Gittenberger, 1973

= Abida ateni =

Species of gastropod

Abida ateni is a species of air-breathing land snail, a terrestrial pulmonate gastropod mollusc in the family Chondrinidae.

== Geographic distribution ==
A. ateni is endemic to France, where it occurs only at three locations in the Aspe valley, in the Western Pyrenees (Pyrénées-Atlantiques).

== Ecology ==
A. ateni is a rock-dwelling species of land snail. It lives on limestone in valley habitats at 300–400 m altitude.

== Conservation ==
A. ateni is listed as vulnerable (VU) in the IUCN Red List of Threatened Species. The species is protected under the French law; however, there is no specific conservation plan for it.

== See also ==
- List of non-marine molluscs of Metropolitan France
