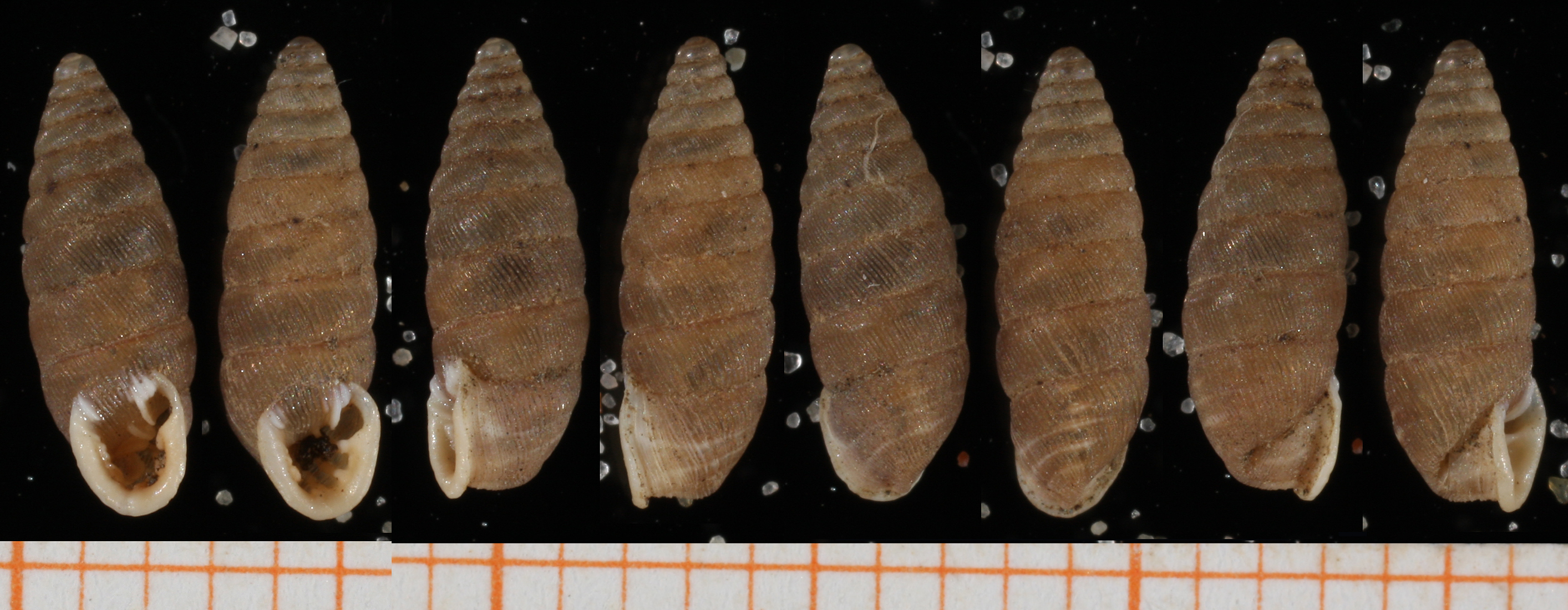
- Eight shells of Abida partioti scale bar is in mm

Conservation status
- Least Concern (IUCN 3.1)

Scientific classification
- Kingdom: Animalia
- Phylum: Mollusca
- Class: Gastropoda
- Order: Stylommatophora
- Family: Chondrinidae
- Genus: Abida
- Species: A. partioti

Binomial name
- Abida partioti (Saint-Simon, 1848)

Synonyms
- Abida escudiei Geniez & Bertrand, 2001; Pupa cristella Westerlund, 1887; Pupa dupuyi Westerlund, 1875; Pupa lallemantiana Bourguignat, 1864; Pupa letourneuxi Bourguignat, 1864; Pupa partioti Saint-Simon, 1848

= Abida partioti =

Species of gastropod

Maillot euskadi (Abida partioti) is a species of air-breathing land snail, a terrestrial pulmonate gastropod mollusc in the family Chondrinidae.

== Geographic distribution ==
The native distribution of A. partioti is restricted to the central Pyrenees, in France and Spain.

== Ecology ==
A. partioti inhabits montane karstic areas, living within crevices or under stones; although in humid environments it can be found on the surface of limestone rocks and rubble.

== See also ==
- List of non-marine molluscs of Metropolitan France
- List of non-marine molluscs of Spain
