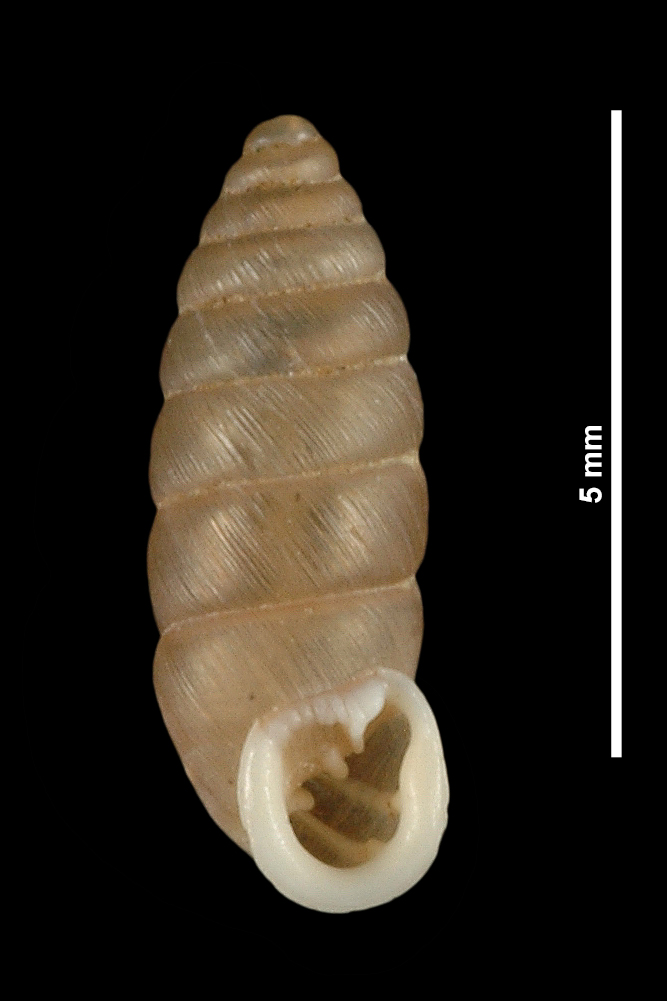
- Shell of Graniberia braunii braunii (specimen at MNHN, Paris)

Scientific classification
- Kingdom: Animalia
- Phylum: Mollusca
- Class: Gastropoda
- Order: Stylommatophora
- Family: Chondrinidae
- Genus: Graniberia; E. Gittenberger, Kokshoorn, Bössneck, Reijnen & Groenenberg, 2016

= Graniberia =

Genus of gastropods

Graniberia is a genus of air-breathing land snail, a terrestrial pulmonate gastropod mollusc in the subfamily Granariinae of the family Chondrinidae.

== Species ==
- Graniberia braunii (Rossmässler, 1842) (synonym: Granaria braunii braunii (Rossmässler, 1842)
