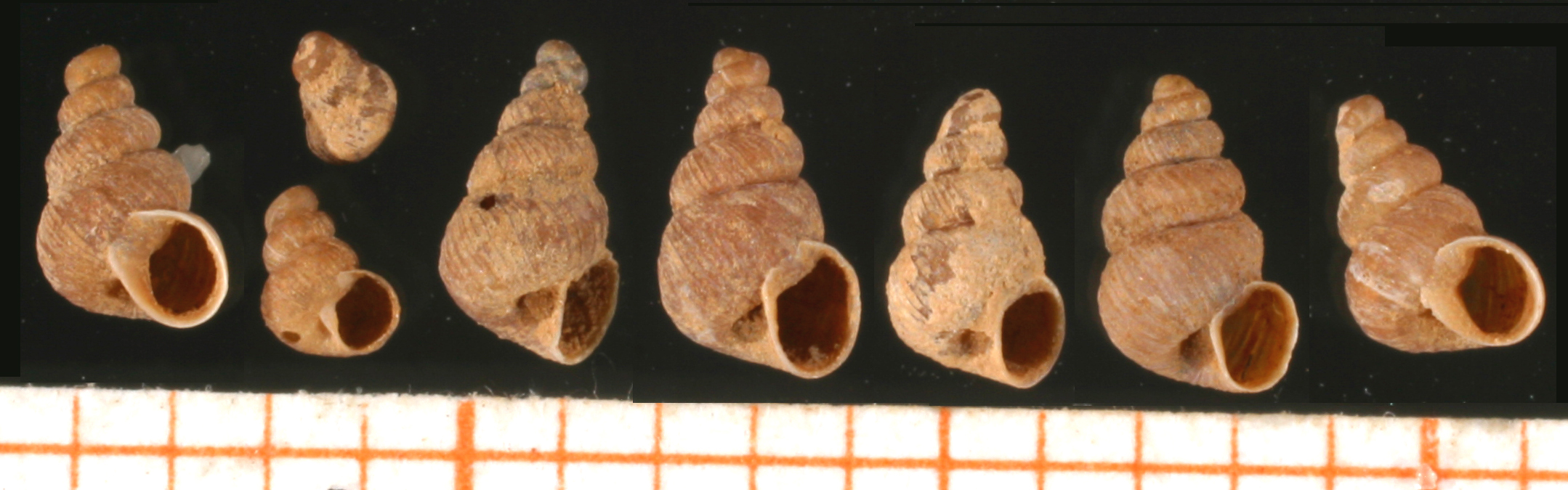
- Rupestrella rupestris

Scientific classification
- Kingdom: Animalia
- Phylum: Mollusca
- Class: Gastropoda
- Order: Stylommatophora
- Family: Chondrinidae
- Genus: Rupestrella; Monterosato, 1894

= Rupestrella =

Genus of land snails

Rupestrella is a genus of gastropods belonging to the family Chondrinidae.

The species of this genus are found in Mediterranean.

Species:

- Rupestrella dupotetii (Terver, 1839)
- Rupestrella homala (Westerlund, 1892)
- Rupestrella occulta (Rossmässler, 1839)
- Rupestrella philippii (Cantraine, 1841)
- Rupestrella rhodia (Roth, 1839)
- Rupestrella rupestris (Philippi, 1836)
