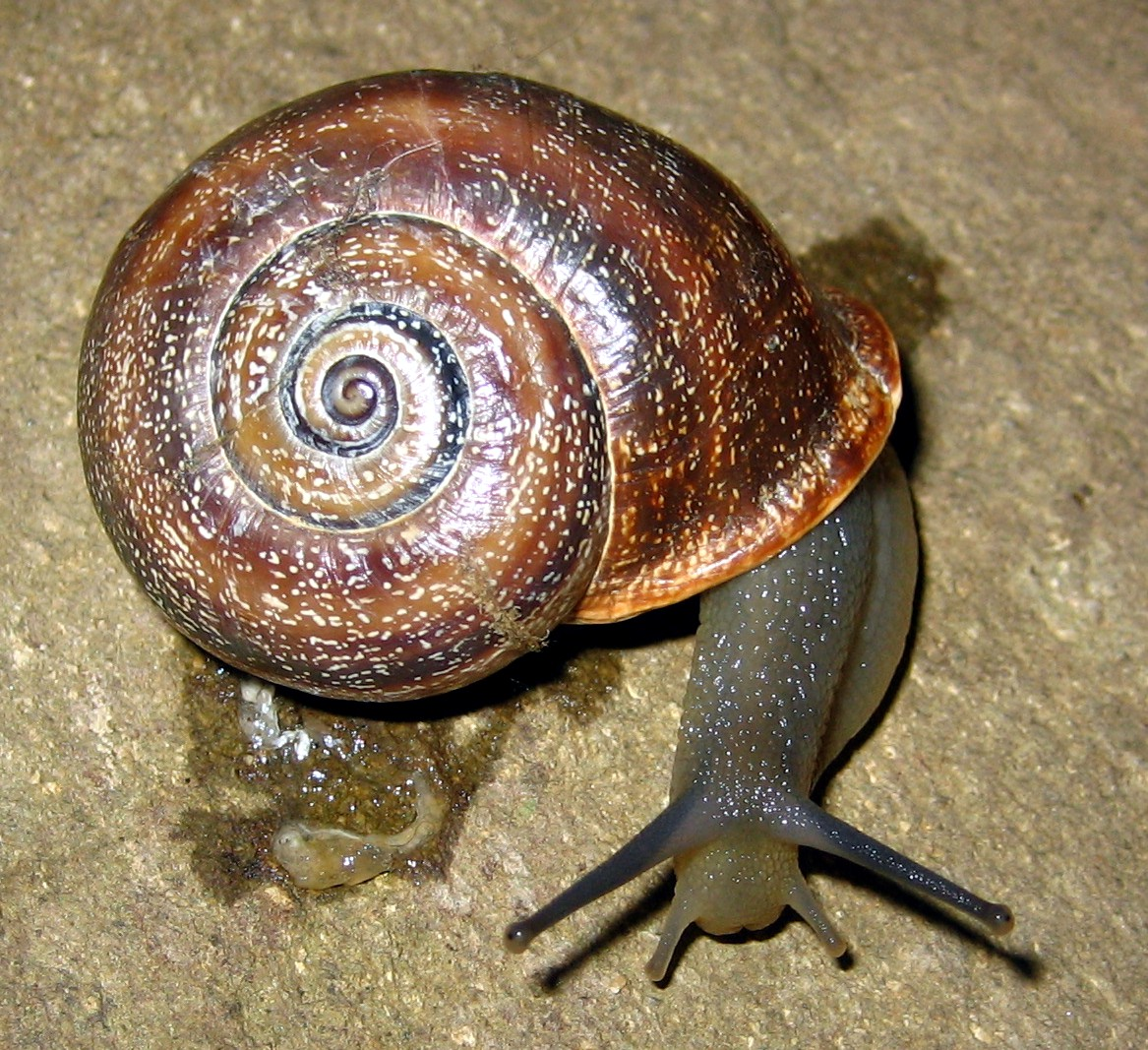

Conservation status
- Least Concern (IUCN 3.1)

Scientific classification
- Kingdom: Animalia
- Phylum: Mollusca
- Class: Gastropoda
- Order: Stylommatophora
- Family: Helicidae
- Genus: Otala
- Species: O. punctata

Binomial name
- Otala punctata (O. F. Müller, 1774)

Synonyms
- List: Archelix abrolena var. incrassata Pallary, 1920; Archelix polita (Gassies, 1856); Helix lactea var. polita Gassies, 1856; Helix punctata O. F. Müller, 1774; Otala (Otala) punctata (O. F. Müller, 1774)

= Otala punctata =

Species of gastropod

Otala punctata is a species of air-breathing land snail, a terrestrial pulmonate gastropod mollusk in the family Helicidae.

== Distribution ==
This species occurs in the Mediterranean basin - Andorra, Spain, the Balearic Islands, France, Corsica, Sardinia and Malta

This species is already established in the United States, and is considered to represent a potentially serious threat as a pest, an invasive species which could negatively affect agriculture, natural ecosystems, human health or commerce. Therefore, it has been suggested that this species be given top national quarantine significance in the USA.

Three views of the shell

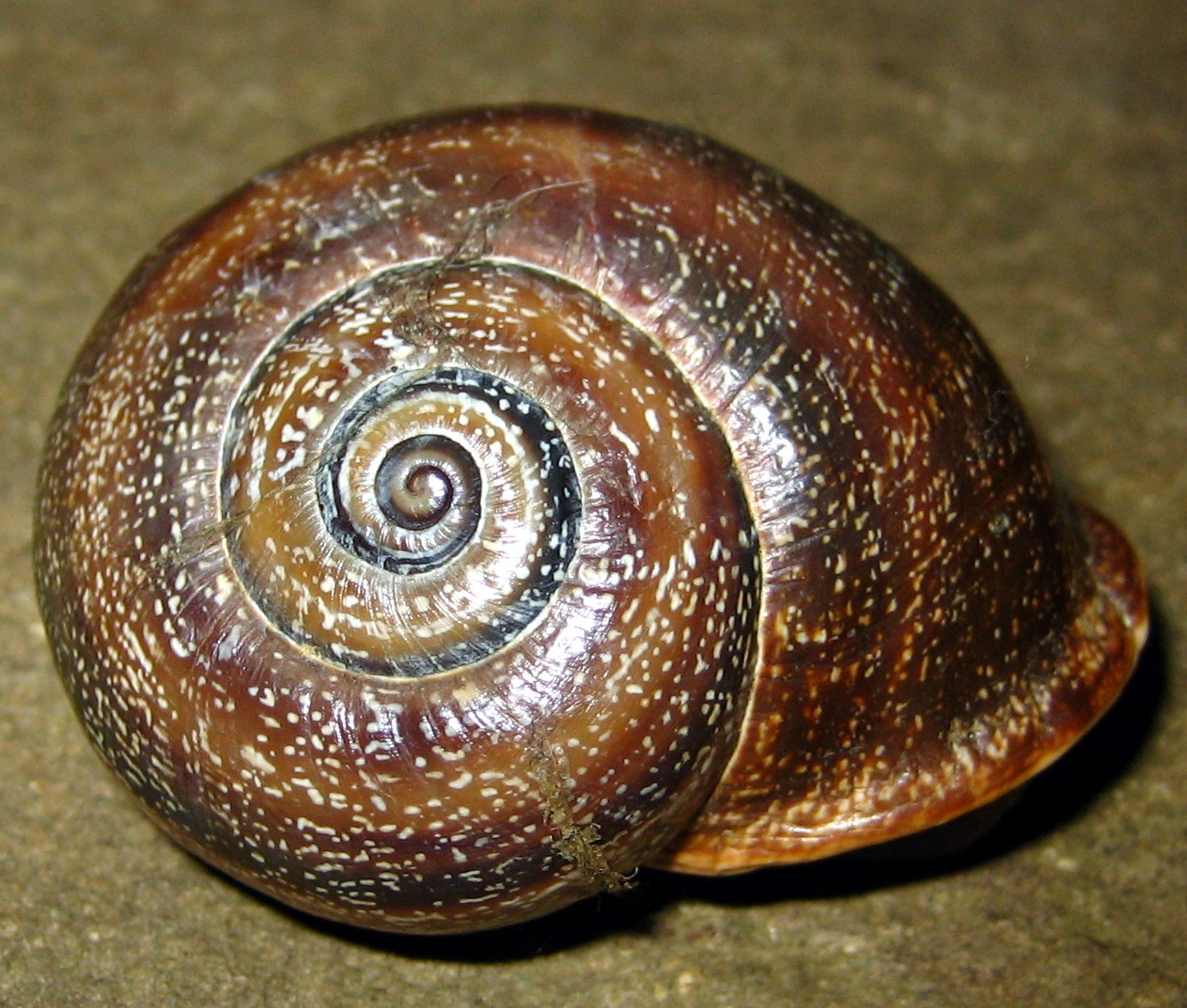
apical view

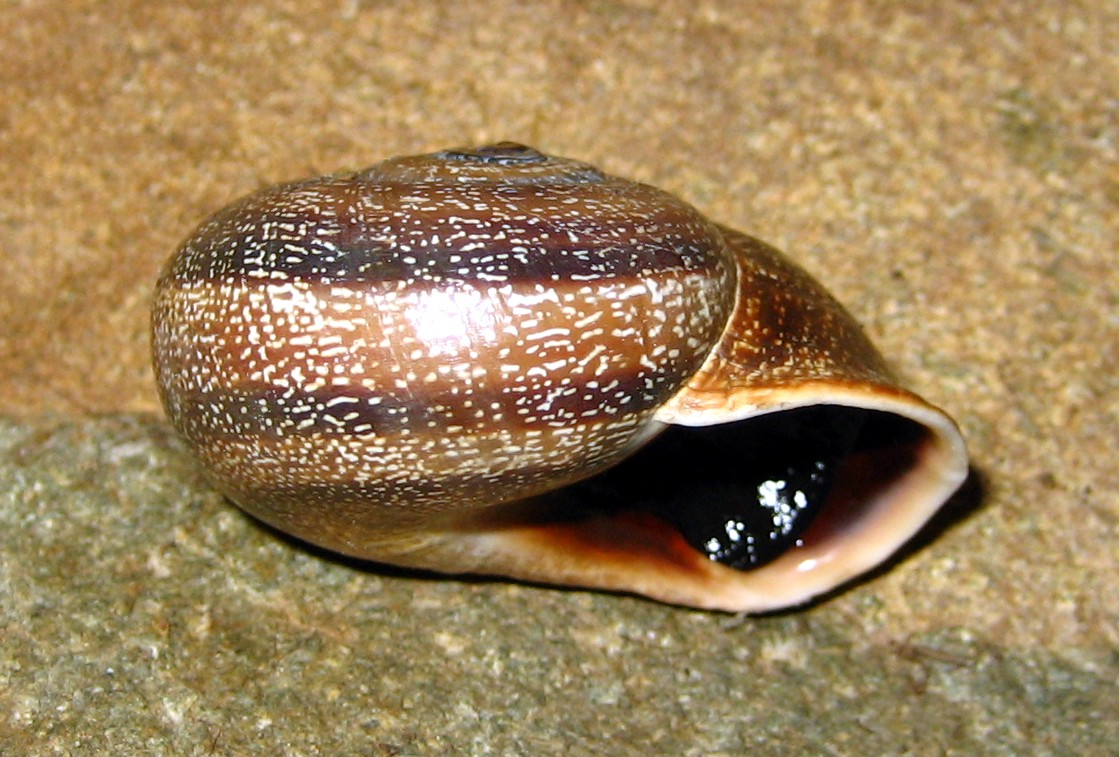
apertural view.

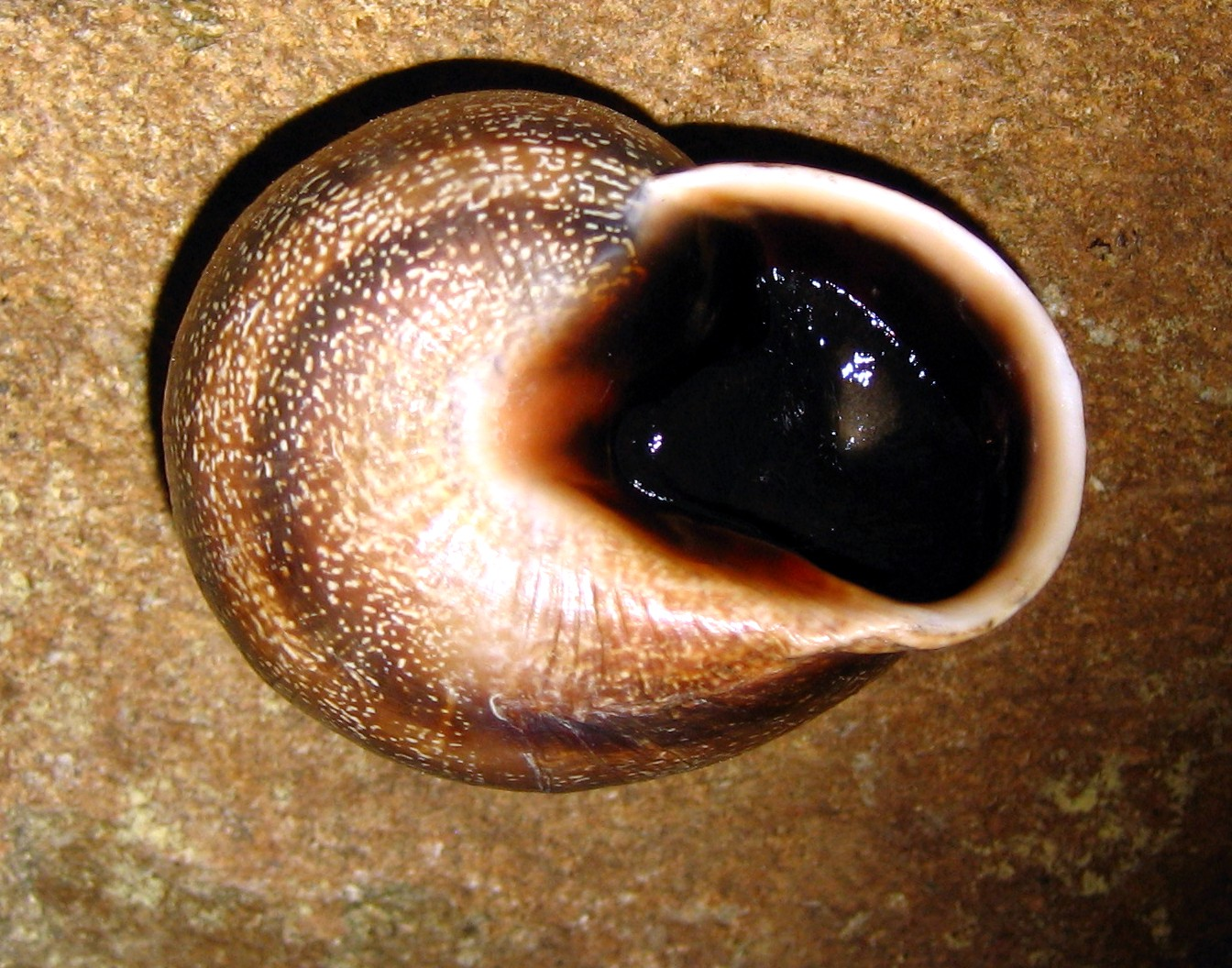
umbilical view

== Culinary ==
In southern Spain they are prepared in a typical dish, "cabrillas", cooked in spicy tomato sauce.
