= Litthabitella elliptica =

Conservation status
- Vulnerable (IUCN 2.3)

Scientific classification
- Kingdom: Animalia
- Phylum: Mollusca
- Class: Gastropoda
- Subclass: Caenogastropoda
- Order: Littorinimorpha
- Family: Hydrobiidae
- Genus: Litthabitella
- Species: L. elliptica

Binomial name
- Litthabitella elliptica (Paladilhe, 1874)

Species of gastropod

Litthabitella elliptica is a species of very small freshwater snails with a gill and an operculum, aquatic gastropod mollusks in the family Hydrobiidae.

This species is endemic to France.
