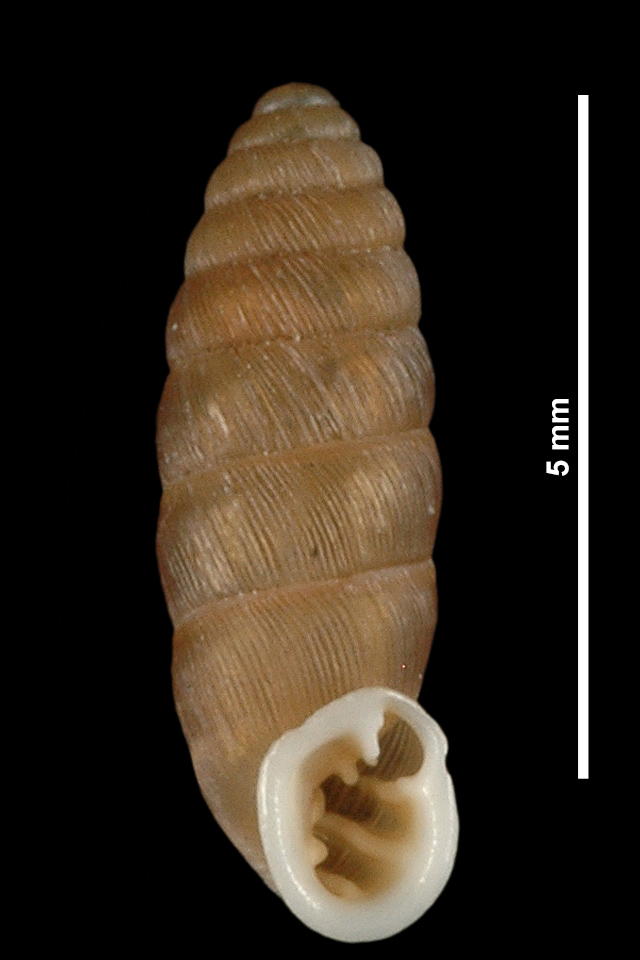
- Shell of Abida vergniesiana (specimen at MNHN, Paris)

Conservation status
- Least Concern (IUCN 3.1)

Scientific classification
- Kingdom: Animalia
- Phylum: Mollusca
- Class: Gastropoda
- Order: Stylommatophora
- Family: Chondrinidae
- Genus: Abida
- Species: A. vergniesiana

Binomial name
- Abida vergniesiana (Küster, 1847)

Synonyms
- Abida pyrenaearia vergniesiana (Küster, 1847); Pupa provida Westerlund, 1902; Pupa vergniesiana Küster, 1847

= Abida vergniesiana =

Species of gastropod

Abida vergniesiana is a species of air-breathing land snail, a terrestrial pulmonate gastropod mollusc in the family Chondrinidae.

== Geographic distribution ==
The native distribution of A. vergniesiana is restricted to France, where it occurs in the upper Garonne catchment in Ariège, and Andorra.

== Ecology ==
A. vergniesiana is a rock-dwelling species of land snail. It lives on limestone.

== See also ==
- List of non-marine molluscs of Metropolitan France
- List of non-marine molluscs of Andorra
