= Arganiella exilis =

Conservation status
- Vulnerable (IUCN 2.3)

Scientific classification
- Kingdom: Animalia
- Phylum: Mollusca
- Class: Gastropoda
- Subclass: Caenogastropoda
- Order: Littorinimorpha
- Family: Hydrobiidae
- Genus: Arganiella
- Species: A. exilis

Binomial name
- Arganiella exilis (Paladilhe, 1867)

Species of gastropod

Arganiella exilis is a species of very small freshwater snail with an operculum, an aquatic operculate gastropod mollusks in the family Hydrobiidae. This species is endemic to France.
