= Corseria corsica =

Conservation status
- Critically Endangered (IUCN 3.1)

Scientific classification
- Kingdom: Animalia
- Phylum: Mollusca
- Class: Gastropoda
- Subclass: Caenogastropoda
- Order: Littorinimorpha
- Family: Moitessieriidae
- Genus: Corseria; Boeters & Falkner, 2009
- Species: C. corsica

Binomial name
- Corseria corsica (Bernasconi, 1994)

Synonyms
- Moitessieria corsica Bernasconi, 1994 (original combination); Spiralix corsica (R. Bernasconi, 1994)

Species of gastropod

Corseria corsica is a species of small freshwater snail with an operculum, an aquatic gastropod micromollusc in the family Moitessieriidae.

This species is endemic to the island of Corsica, a department of France. The IUCN regards C. corsica as Critically Endangered (Possibly Extinct) as it has not been observed for 16 years.
