= Arganiella =

Scientific classification
- Domain: Eukaryota
- Kingdom: Animalia
- Phylum: Mollusca
- Class: Gastropoda
- Subclass: Caenogastropoda
- Order: Littorinimorpha
- Family: Hydrobiidae
- Genus: Arganiella

Genus of gastropods

Arganiella is a species of very small freshwater snail with an operculum, an aquatic operculate gastropod mollusks in the family Hydrobiidae.

== Species ==
Species in the genus Arganiella include:

- Arganiella exilis (Paladilhe, 1867)
