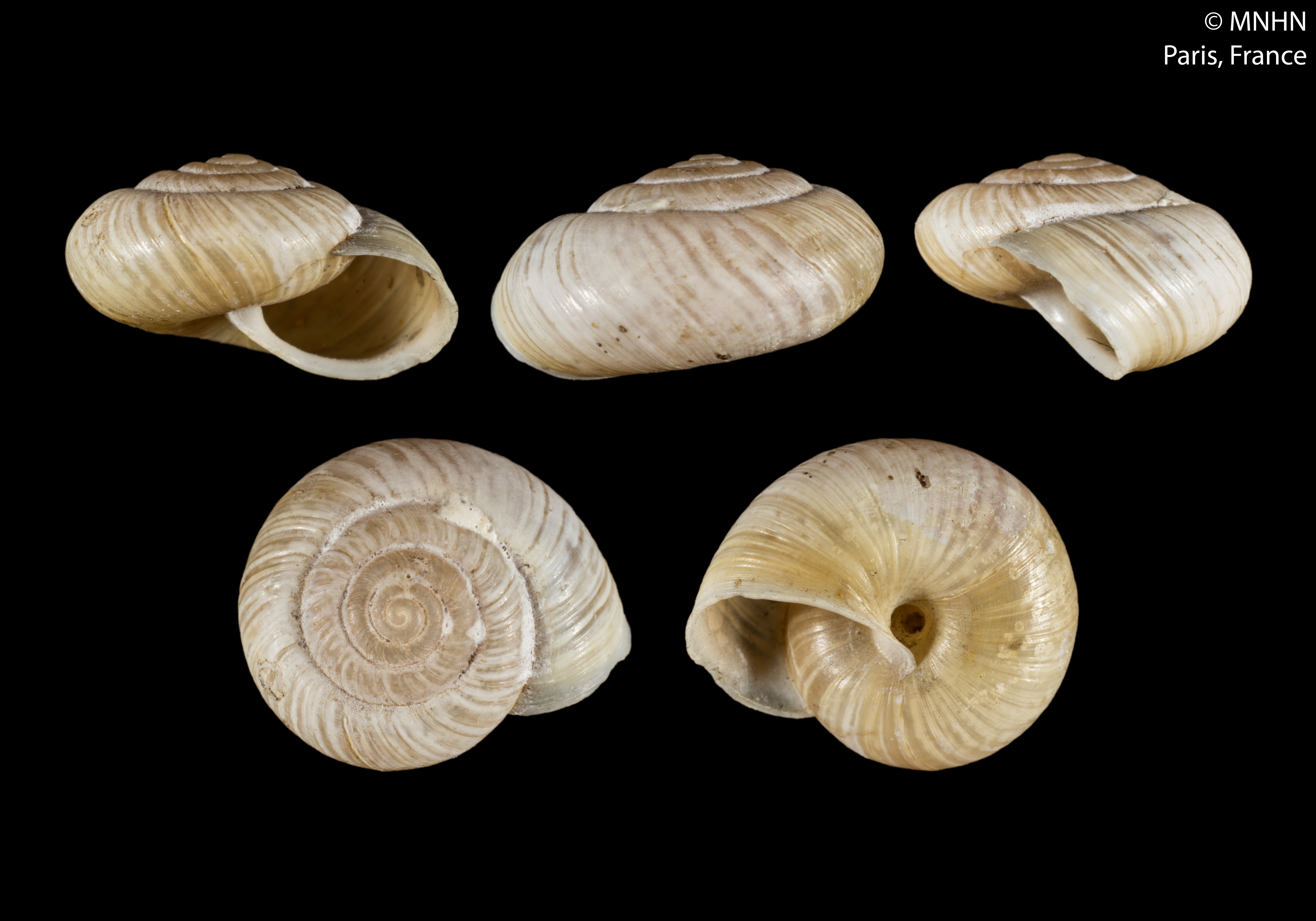
- Shell of Pyrenaearia carascalensis (syntype at MNHN, Paris)

Conservation status
- Vulnerable (IUCN 3.1)

Scientific classification
- Kingdom: Animalia
- Phylum: Mollusca
- Class: Gastropoda
- Order: Stylommatophora
- Family: Hygromiidae
- Genus: Pyrenaearia
- Species: P. carascalensis

Binomial name
- Pyrenaearia carascalensis (Michaud, 1831)

Synonyms
- Helix carascalensis Michaud, 1831 · (original combination); Pyrenaearia velascoi (Hidalgo, 1867)

= Pyrenaearia carascalensis =

Species of gastropod

Pyrenaearia carascalensis is a species of small air-breathing land snail, a terrestrial pulmonate gastropod mollusk in the family Hygromiidae, the hairy snails and their allies.

Subspecies

- Pyrenaearia carascalensis carascalensis (Michaud, 1831)
- Pyrenaearia carascalensis transfuga (Fagot, 1885)

== Description ==
The size of the snail attains 13.2 mm. Pyrenaearia carascalensis exhibits the typical morphological features of the genus, including a small to medium-sized shell that is usually globose to slightly depressed in shape. The shell surface is generally finely ribbed or striated, with coloration varying from pale to darker shades of brown or gray.

== Distribution ==
This species is endemic to Spain and is found in Carascal (Aragon).
