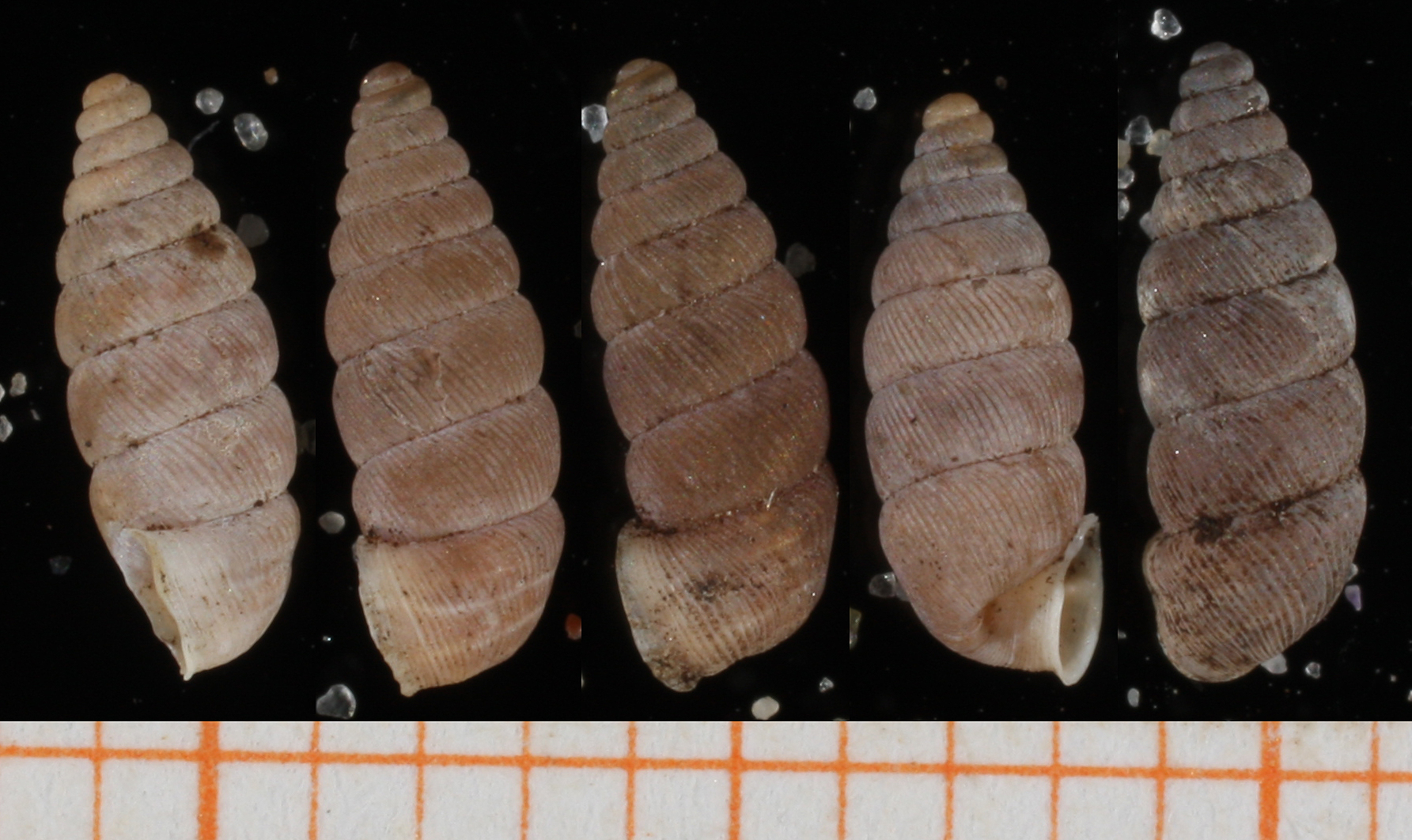
- Five shells of Abida vasconica scale bar in mm

Conservation status
- Least Concern (IUCN 3.1)

Scientific classification
- Kingdom: Animalia
- Phylum: Mollusca
- Class: Gastropoda
- Order: Stylommatophora
- Family: Chondrinidae
- Genus: Abida
- Species: A. vasconica

Binomial name
- Abida vasconica (Kobelt, 1882)

= Abida vasconica =

Species of gastropod

Abida vasconica is a species of small air-breathing land snail, a terrestrial pulmonate gastropod mollusc in the family Chondrinidae. This species is endemic to northern Spain.

== Geographic distribution ==
Abida vasconica is limited to the central part of the Cantabrian Mountains, from Asturias and León in the west to Bizkaia and Álava in the east. This land snail is mainly found on northern slopes.

== Ecology ==
The species can be found in soils with limestone substrate, under rocks and leaf litter and within crevices in rock. It can be found on vertical rock surfaces in areas of high humidity.
