= Litthabitella =

Scientific classification
- Kingdom: Animalia
- Phylum: Mollusca
- Class: Gastropoda
- Subclass: Caenogastropoda
- Order: Littorinimorpha
- Family: Hydrobiidae
- Genus: Litthabitella; Boeters, 1970

Genus of gastropods

Litthabitella is a genus of very small freshwater snails with a gill and an operculum, aquatic gastropod mollusks in the family Hydrobiidae.

== Species ==
Species within the genus Litthabitella include:

- Litthabitella elliptica
