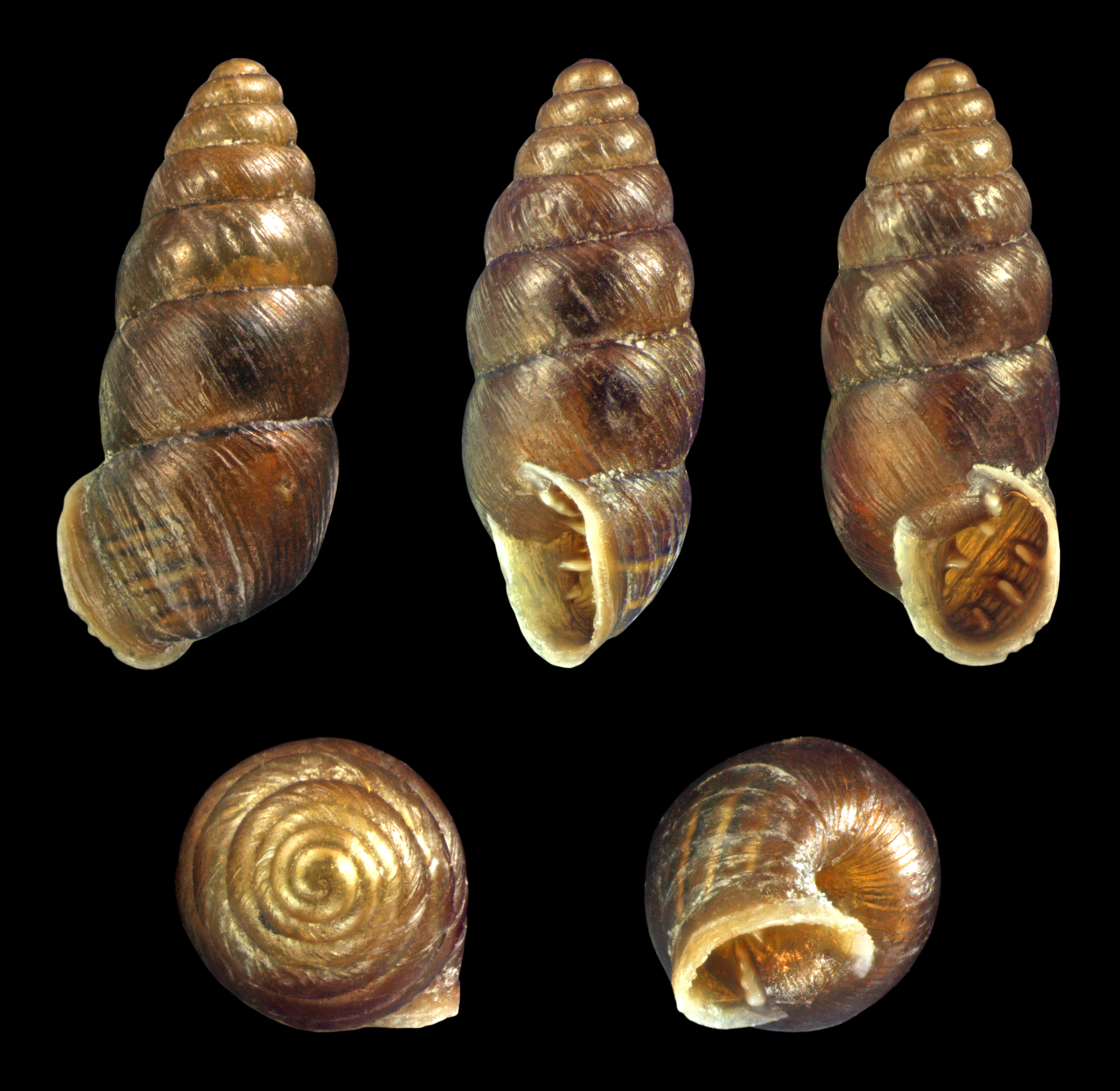
- A shell of Chondrina avenacea

Conservation status
- Least Concern (IUCN 3.1)

Scientific classification
- Kingdom: Animalia
- Phylum: Mollusca
- Class: Gastropoda
- Order: Stylommatophora
- Family: Chondrinidae
- Genus: Chondrina
- Species: C. avenacea

Binomial name
- Chondrina avenacea (Bruguière, 1792)

= Chondrina avenacea =

Species of Gastropoda

Chondrina avenacea is a species of small, air-breathing land snail, a terrestrial pulmonate gastropod mollusk in the family Chondrinidae.

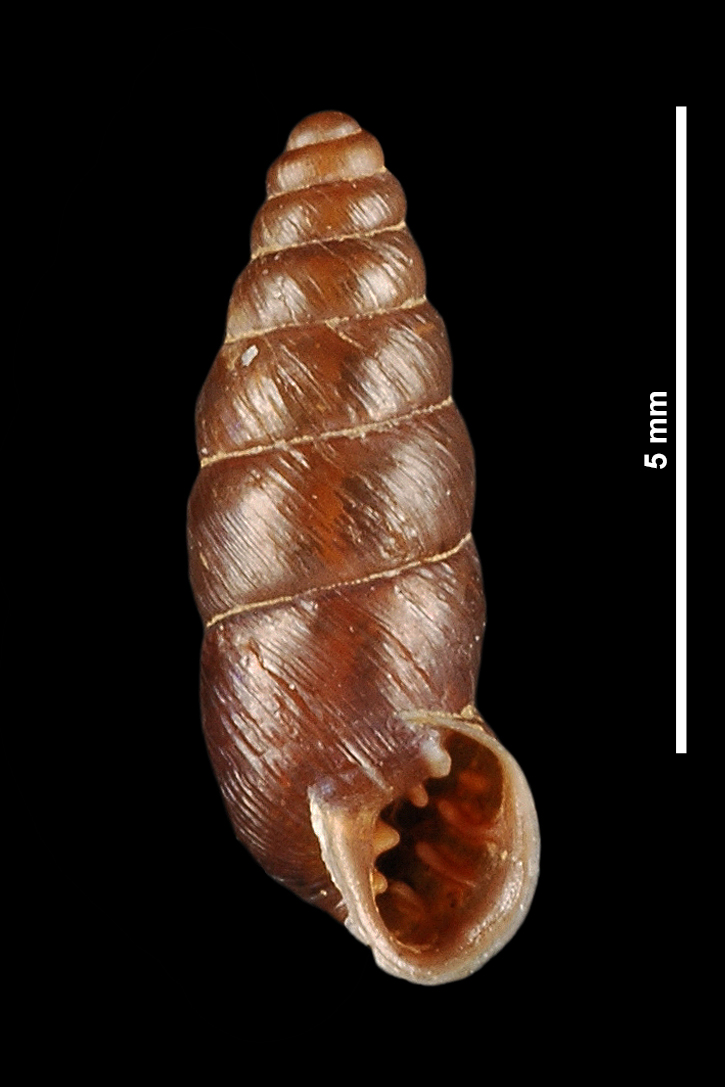
Shell of Chondrina avenacea avenacea (specimen at MNHN, Paris)

Subspecies

- Chondrina avenacea avenacea (Bruguière, 1792)
- Chondrina avenacea istriana Ehrmann, 1931
- Chondrina avenacea latilabris (Stossich, 1895)
- Chondrina avenacea lepta (Westerlund, 1887)
- Chondrina avenacea lessinica (Adami, 1885)
- Chondrina avenacea veneta H. Nordsieck, 1962

== Distribution ==
This species occurs in:

- Western Europe
- Bulgaria

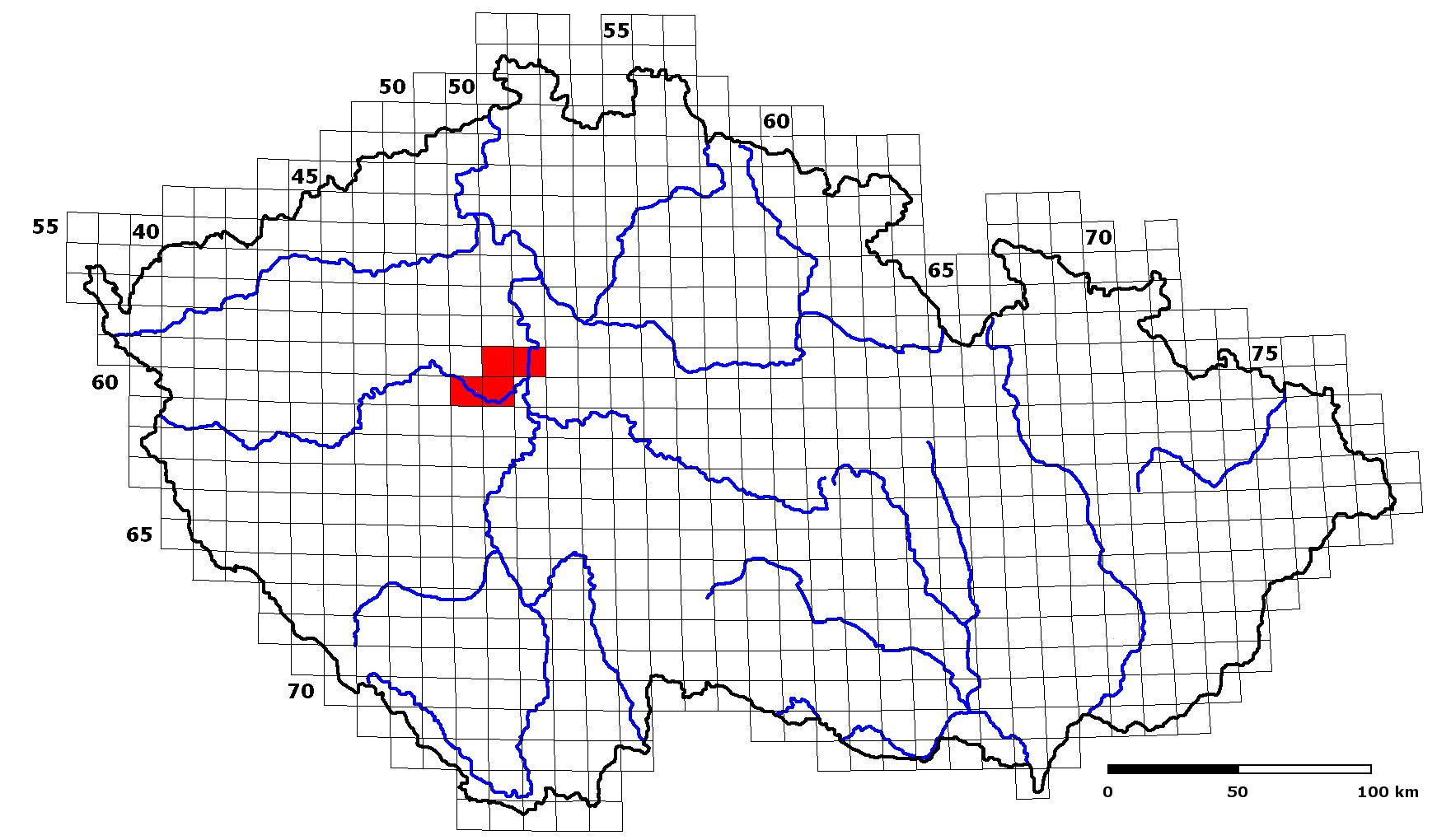
The distribution of Chondrina avenacea (marked red) on a grid map of the Czech Republic

- Czech Republic - in Bohemia, endangered (EN)
