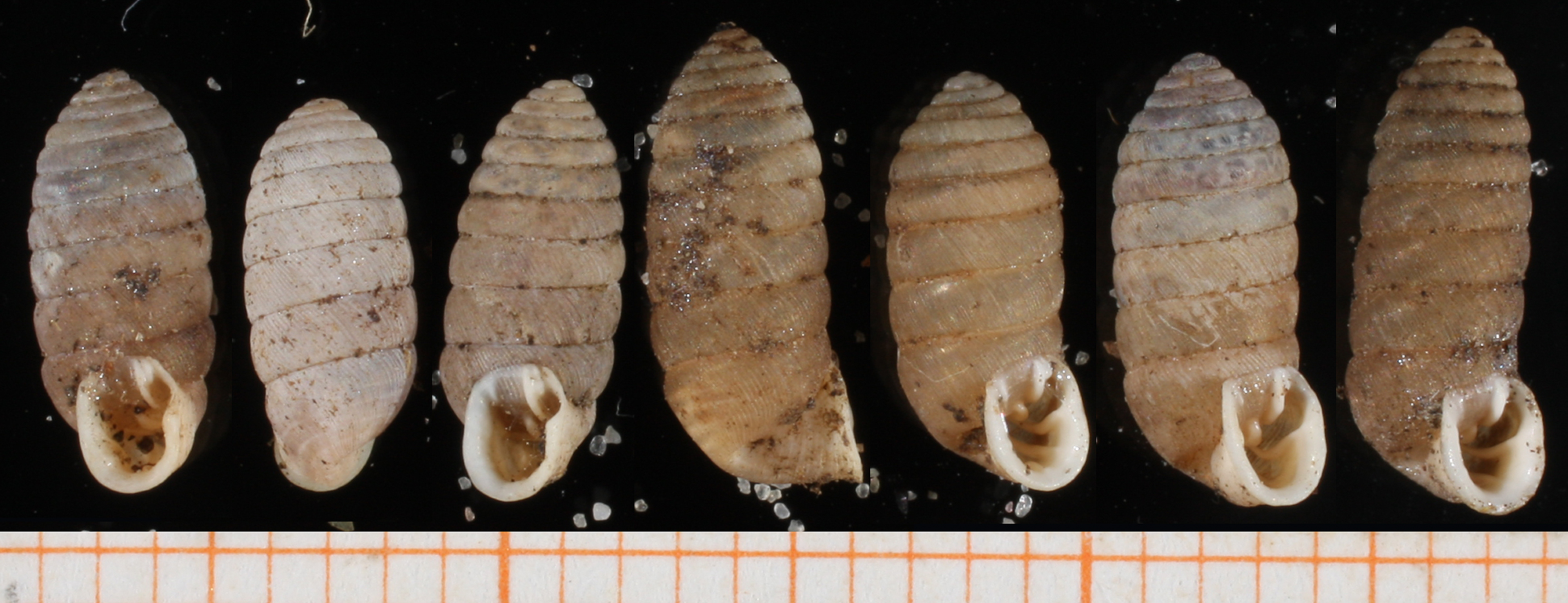
- Seven shells of Abida cylindrica scale bar is in mm

Conservation status
- Least Concern (IUCN 3.1)

Scientific classification
- Kingdom: Animalia
- Phylum: Mollusca
- Class: Gastropoda
- Order: Stylommatophora
- Family: Chondrinidae
- Genus: Abida
- Species: A. cylindrica

Binomial name
- Abida cylindrica (Michaud, 1829)

= Abida cylindrica =

Species of gastropod

Abida cylindrica is a species of air-breathing land snail, a terrestrial pulmonate gastropod mollusc in the family Chondrinidae.

== Geographic distribution ==
Abida cylindrica is restricted to Pyrenees-Orientales in France, and Catalonia in Spain.

== Ecology ==
Abida bigerrensis lives within crevices or under stones in karstic areas. In humid environments it may also be found on the rock surface.
