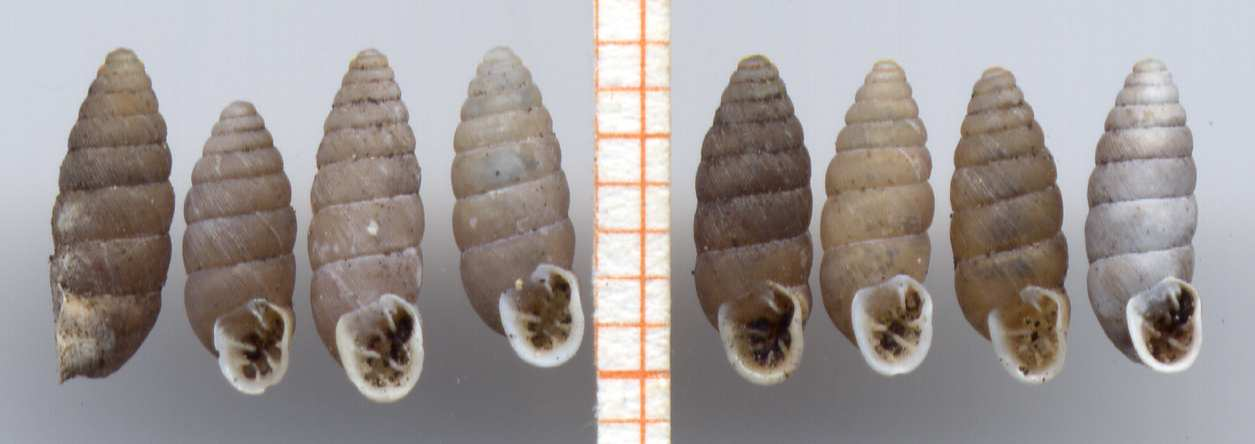
- Eight shells of Abida secale scale bar in mm

Conservation status
- Least Concern (IUCN 3.1)

Scientific classification
- Kingdom: Animalia
- Phylum: Mollusca
- Class: Gastropoda
- Order: Stylommatophora
- Family: Chondrinidae
- Genus: Abida
- Species: A. secale

Binomial name
- Abida secale (Draparnaud, 1801)

= Abida secale =

Species of gastropod

Abida secale is a species of small air-breathing land snail, a terrestrial pulmonate gastropod mollusc in the family Chondrinidae.

== Distribution ==
The distribution of this species is Western European and Alpine regions.

This species is known to occur in a number of Western European countries and islands including:

- Great Britain: England
- Sardinia
- Switzerland
- and other areas

== Habitat ==
This species only occurs on calcareous rocks.

== Subspecies ==
This species has a number of named subspecies:

- Abida secale secale
- Abida secale cadiensis Gittenberger, 1973
- Abida secale lilietensis (Bofill, 1886)
- Abida secale margaridae Bech, 1988
- Abida secale branopsis (Bofill, 1886)
- Abida secale vilellai Kokshoorn & Gittenberger, 2010
- Abida secale peteri Kokshoorn & Gittenberger, 2010
- Abida secale merijni Kokshoorn & Gittenberger, 2010
- Abida secale ionicae Kokshoorn & Gittenberger, 2010
