= Abida gittenbergeri =

Conservation status
- Least Concern (IUCN 3.1)

Scientific classification
- Kingdom: Animalia
- Phylum: Mollusca
- Class: Gastropoda
- Order: Stylommatophora
- Family: Chondrinidae
- Genus: Abida
- Species: A. gittenbergeri

Binomial name
- Abida gittenbergeri (Bössneck, 2000)

Species of gastropod

Maillot élancé (Abida gittenbergeri) is a species of air-breathing land snail, a terrestrial pulmonate gastropod mollusc in the family Chondrinidae.

== Geographic distribution ==
A. gittenbergeri is restricted to a small area consisting of the Garrotxa and Alt Empordà regions in Spain as well as the adjacent Coustouges region in France.

== Ecology ==
The species can be found in soils with limestone substrate, under rocks and leaf litter and within crevices in rock.
