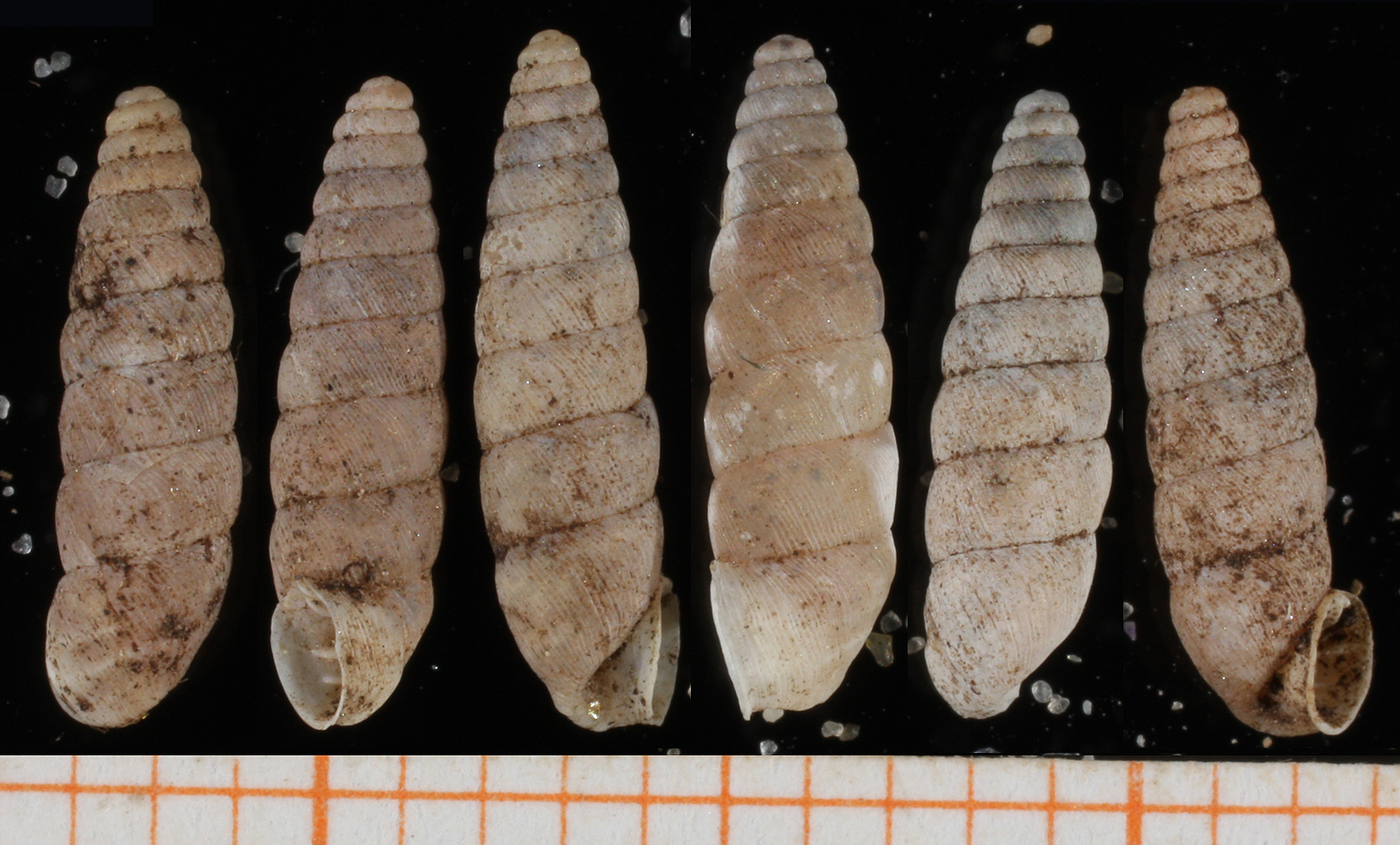
- Six shells of Abida attenuata scale bar is in mm

Conservation status
- Least Concern (IUCN 3.1)

Scientific classification
- Kingdom: Animalia
- Phylum: Mollusca
- Class: Gastropoda
- Order: Stylommatophora
- Family: Chondrinidae
- Genus: Abida
- Species: A. attenuata

Binomial name
- Abida attenuata (Fagot, 1886)

= Abida attenuata =

Species of gastropod

Abida attenuata is a species of air-breathing land snail, a terrestrial pulmonate gastropod mollusc in the family Chondrinidae.

== Geographic distribution ==
Abida attenuata is found only in two disjunct populations, one in the Eastern Pyrenees in France, and one in the Basque Country in Spain.

== Ecology ==
Abida attenuata is a rock-dwelling species of land snail. It lives on limestone.

== Sources ==
- Kerney, M.P., Cameron, R.A.D. & Jungbluth, J-H. (1983). Die Landschnecken Nord- und Mitteleuropas. Ein Bestimmungsbuch für Biologen und Naturfreunde, 384 pp., 24 plates. [Summer or later]. Hamburg / Berlin (Paul Parey). page(s): 292
- Bank, R. A.; Neubert, E. (2017). Checklist of the land and freshwater Gastropoda of Europe. Last update: July 16, 2017
