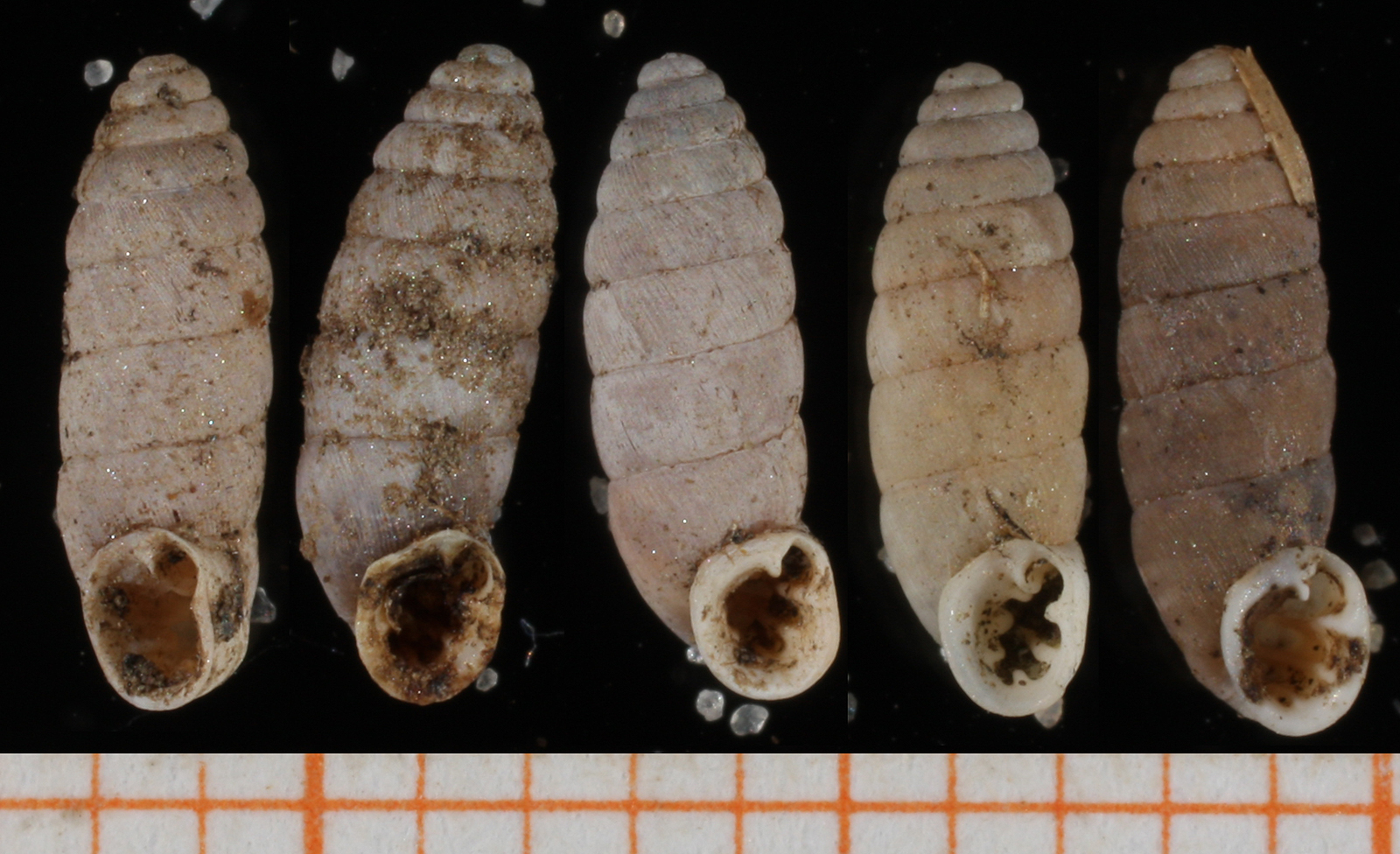
- Five shells of Abida pyrenaearia scale bar in mm

Conservation status
- Least Concern (IUCN 3.1)

Scientific classification
- Kingdom: Animalia
- Phylum: Mollusca
- Class: Gastropoda
- Order: Stylommatophora
- Family: Chondrinidae
- Genus: Abida
- Species: A. pyrenaearia

Binomial name
- Abida pyrenaearia (Michaud, 1831)

= Abida pyrenaearia =

Species of gastropod

Abida pyrenaearia is a species of air-breathing land snail, a terrestrial pulmonate gastropod mollusc in the family Chondrinidae.

== Geographic distribution ==
Abida pyrenaearia is found in central and western Pyrenees. The largest population is found in France with some subpopulations in Spain.

== Ecology ==
The species can be found living on limestone rocks.
