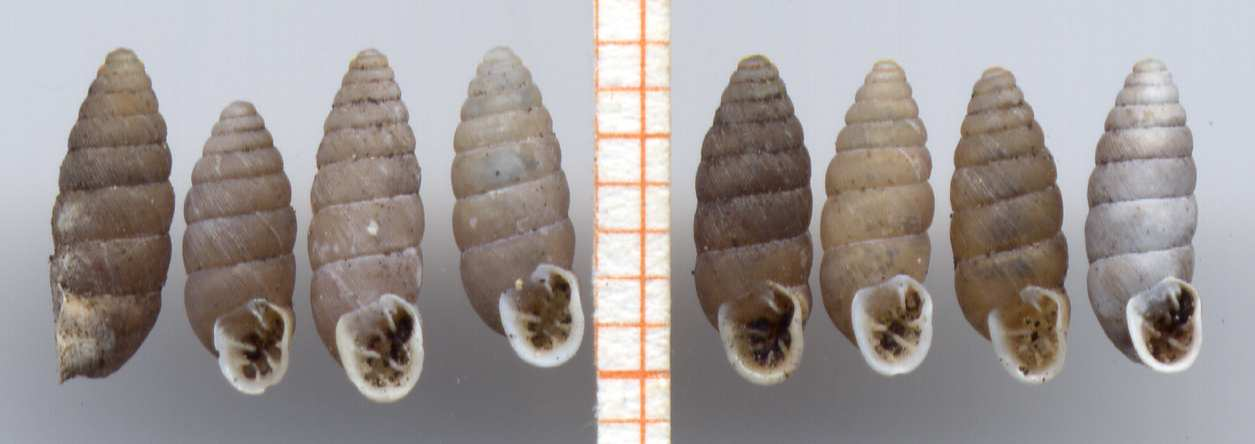
- Eight shells of Abida secale scale bar in mm

Scientific classification
- Domain: Eukaryota
- Kingdom: Animalia
- Phylum: Mollusca
- Class: Gastropoda
- Order: Stylommatophora
- Family: Chondrinidae
- Genus: Abida; Turton, 1831

= Abida (gastropod) =

Genus of gastropods

Abida is a genus of small air-breathing land snails, terrestrial gastropod mollusks in the family Chondrinidae.

== Distribution ==
This is a European genus. It consists of about 10 species, most of which are restricted to the Pyrenees and Cantabrian mountains in France and Spain. Only Abida secale and Abida polyodon occur outside this area.

== Species ==
The species in this genus include:

Image	Binomial name	Distribution
	Abida attenuata	
	Abida bigerrensis	
	Abida cylindrica	
	Abida gittenbergeri	
	Abida occidentalis	
	Abida partioti	
	Abida polyodon	
	Abida pyrenaeria	
	Abida secale	
	Abida vasconica	
	Abida vergniesiana	

== Habitat ==
The species in this genus all are restricted to areas with calcareous rocks, i.e. limestone areas.
