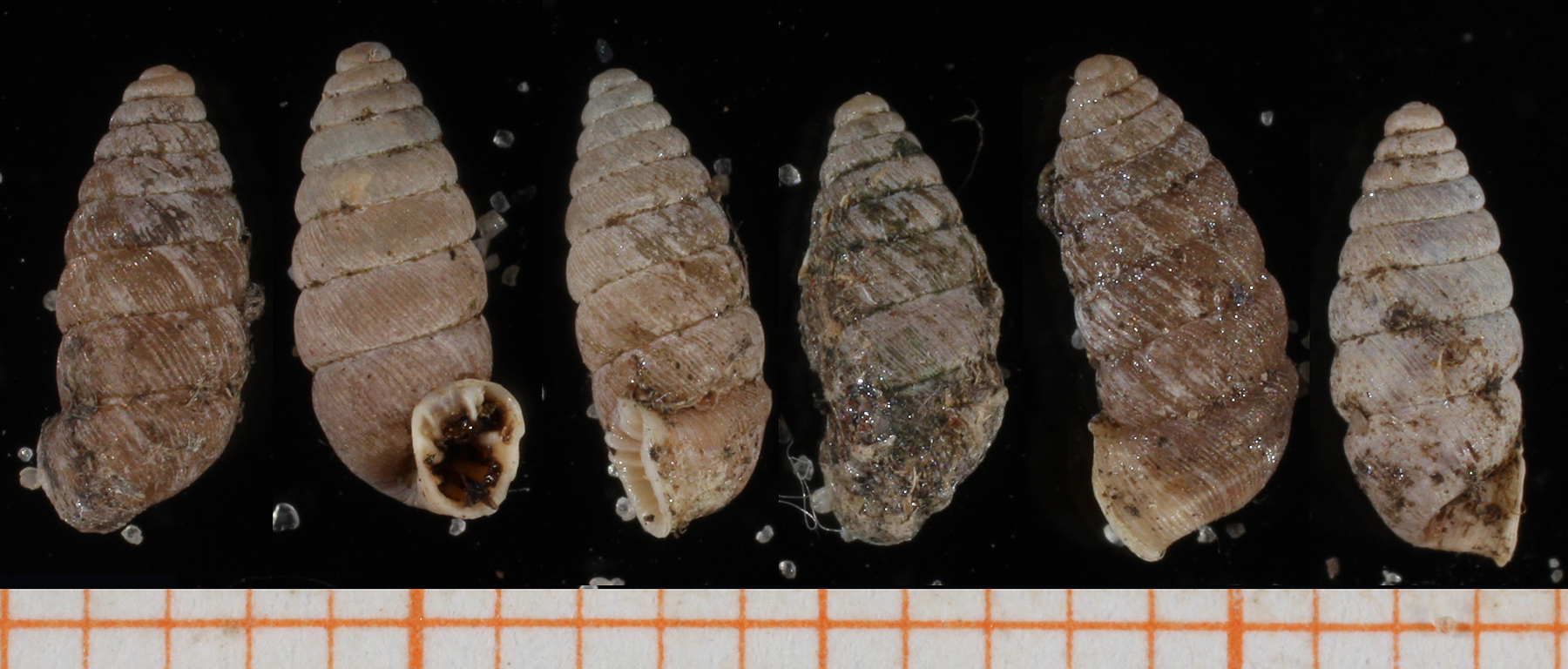
- Six shells of Abida bigerrensis scale bar is in mm

Conservation status
- Least Concern (IUCN 3.1)

Scientific classification
- Kingdom: Animalia
- Phylum: Mollusca
- Class: Gastropoda
- Order: Stylommatophora
- Family: Chondrinidae
- Genus: Abida
- Species: A. bigerrensis

Binomial name
- Abida bigerrensis (Moquin-Tandon, 1856)

= Abida bigerrensis =

Species of gastropod

Abida bigerrensis is a species of air-breathing land snail, a terrestrial pulmonate gastropod mollusc in the family Chondrinidae.

== Geographic distribution ==
Abida bigerrensis is restricted to the central and western Pyrenees in France, and the eastern Cantabrian Mountains in Spain.

== Ecology ==
Abida bigerrensis lives within crevices or under stones in karstic areas. In humid environments it may also be found on the rock surface.
