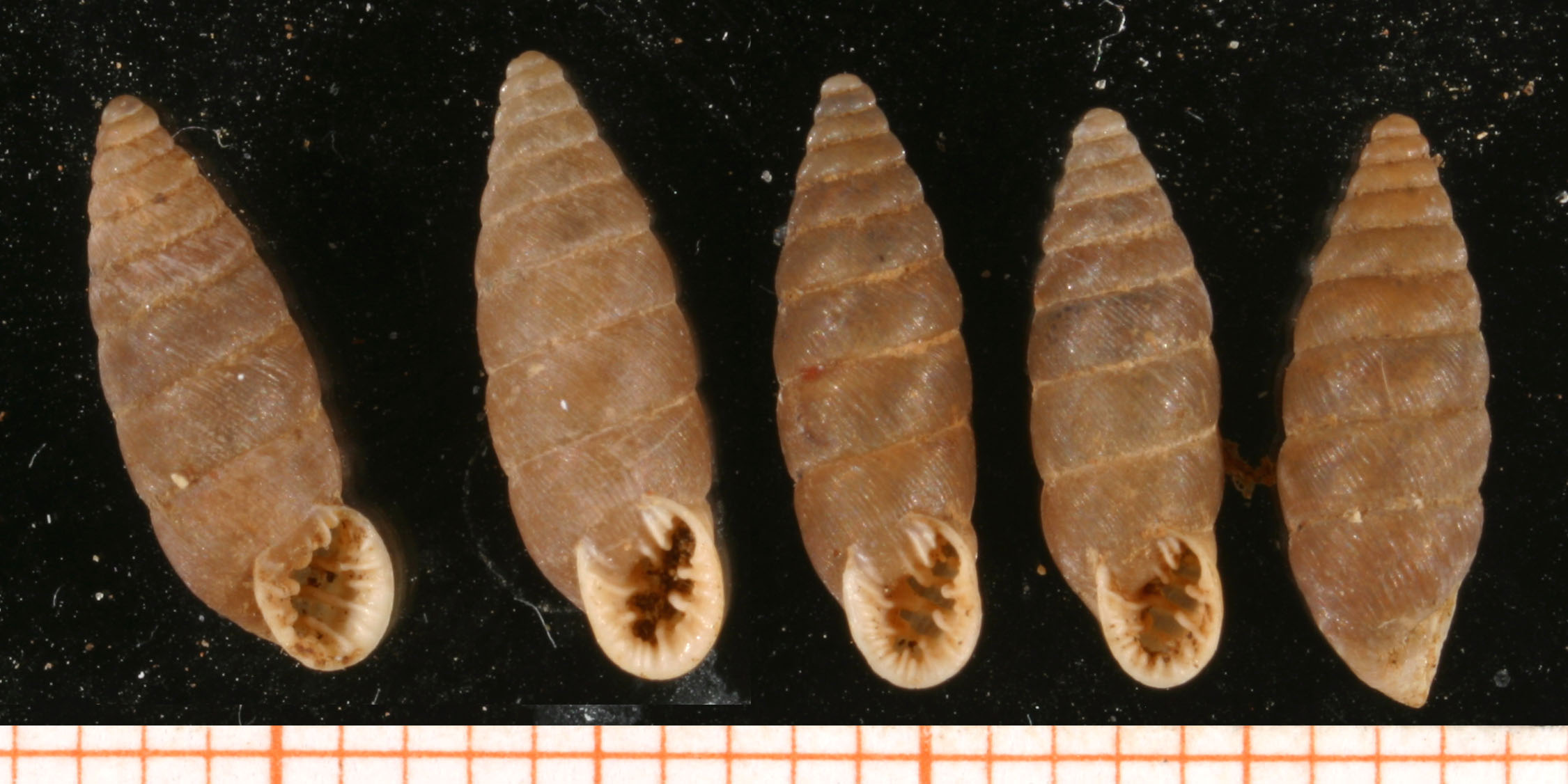
- Five shells of Abida polyodon scale bar in mm

Conservation status
- Least Concern (IUCN 3.1)

Scientific classification
- Kingdom: Animalia
- Phylum: Mollusca
- Class: Gastropoda
- Order: Stylommatophora
- Family: Chondrinidae
- Genus: Abida
- Species: A. polyodon

Binomial name
- Abida polyodon (Draparnaud, 1801)

= Abida polyodon =

Species of gastropod

Abida polyodon is a species of air-breathing land snails, a terrestrial pulmonate gastropod mollusc in the family Chondrinidae.

== Geographic distribution ==
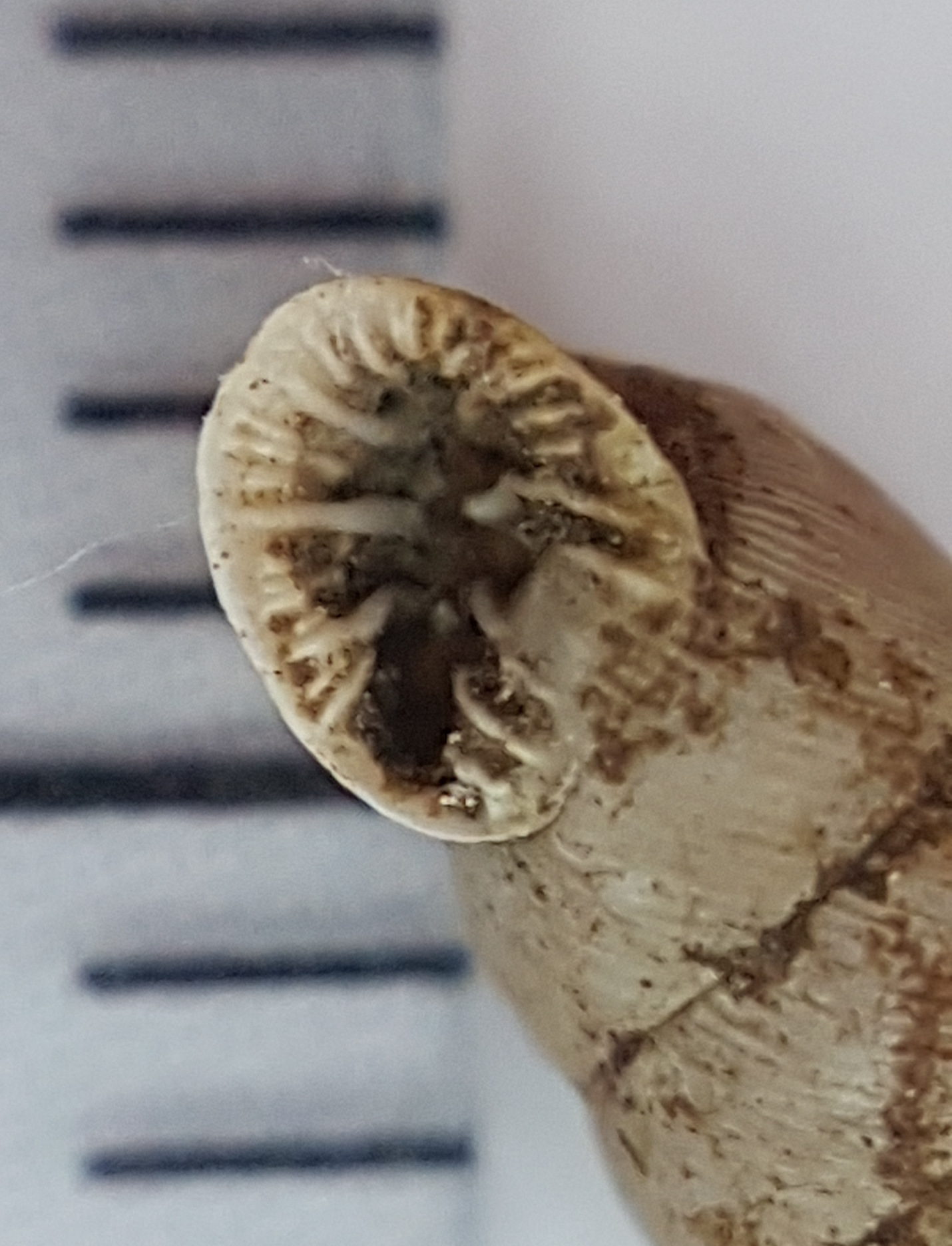
Aperture of Abida polyodon

Abida polyodon is found in France (the Lower Rhone drainage, Massif Central, and the Eastern Pyrenees), Andorra, and Spain (most of Catalonia and the island of Menorca).

== Ecology ==
The species can be found sheltering under stones in places with a calcareous substrate. It is also occasionally found on the surface of rocks.
