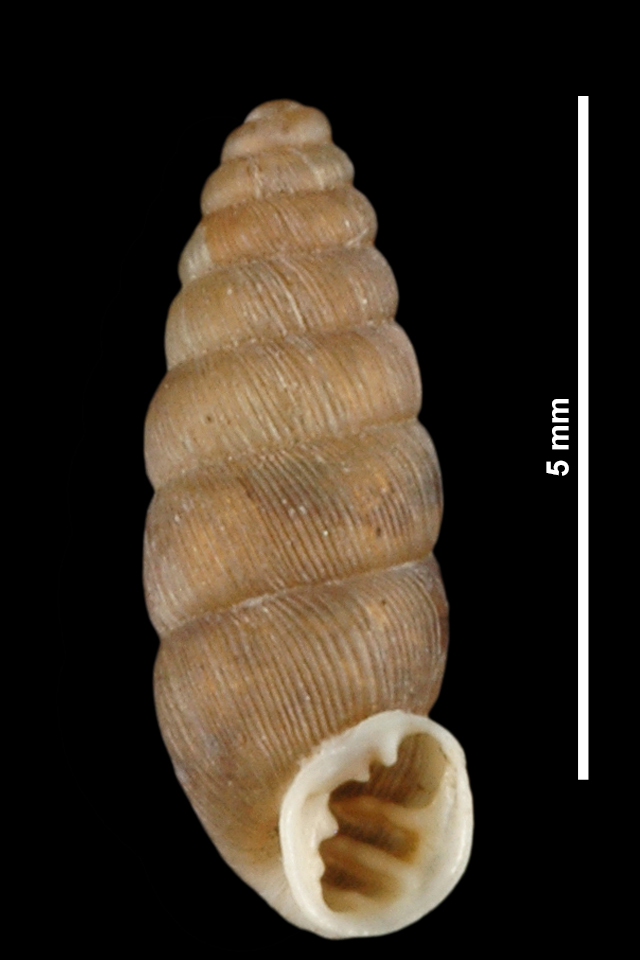
- Shell of Abida occidentalis (specimen at MNHN, Paris)

Conservation status
- Least Concern (IUCN 3.1)

Scientific classification
- Kingdom: Animalia
- Phylum: Mollusca
- Class: Gastropoda
- Order: Stylommatophora
- Family: Chondrinidae
- Genus: Abida
- Species: A. occidentalis

Binomial name
- Abida occidentalis (Fagot, 1888)

= Abida occidentalis =

Species of gastropod

Abida occidentalis is a species of land snail in the family Chondrinidae.

== Geographic distribution ==
Abida occidentalis is found in France on northern slopes of the Pyrenees, as well as in a few locations in Andorra and Catalonia.

== Ecology ==
The species can be found living on limestone.
