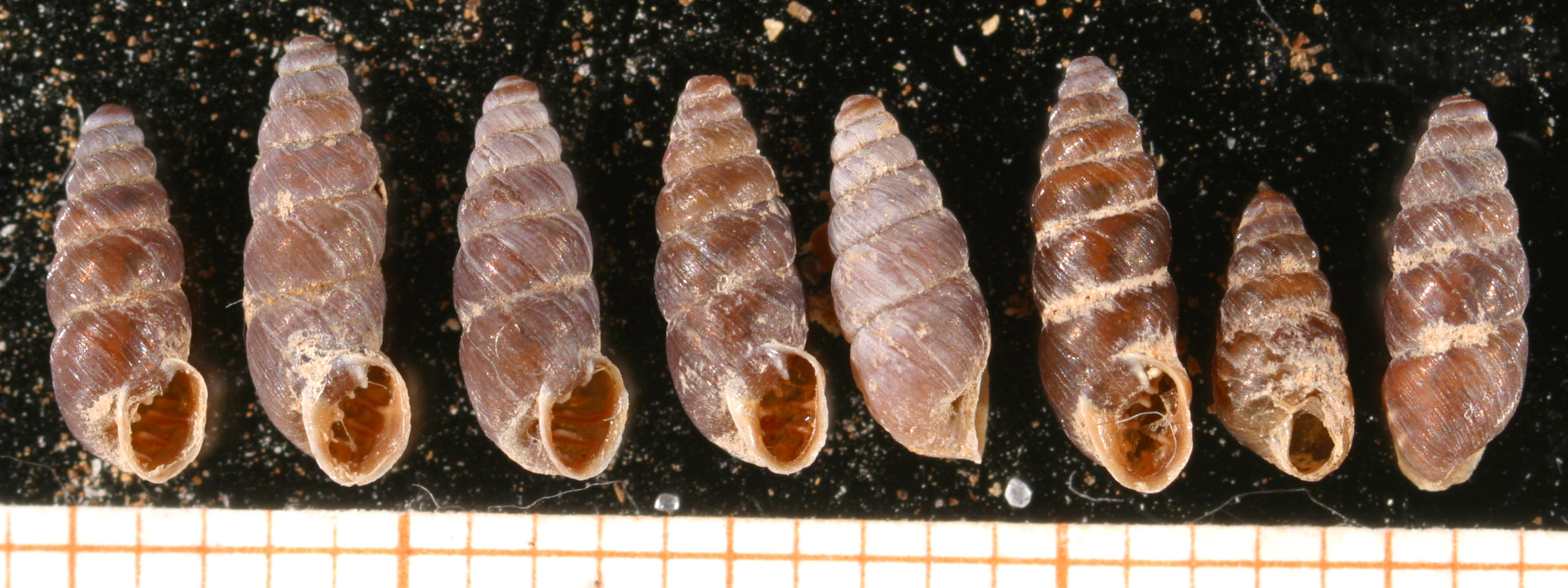
- 8 shells of Chondrina avenacea, scale in mm

Scientific classification
- Kingdom: Animalia
- Phylum: Mollusca
- Class: Gastropoda
- Order: Stylommatophora
- Superfamily: Pupilloidea
- Family: Chondrinidae; Steenberg, 1925

Genera
- see text

Diversity
- about 70 extant species in six genera plus 4 new species in 2010

= Chondrinidae =

Family of gastropods

Chondrinidae is a family of mostly minute air-breathing land snails, terrestrial pulmonate gastropod mollusks in the order Pulmonata.

== Anatomy ==
In this family, the number of haploid chromosomes lies between 26 and 30 (according to the values in this table).

== Taxonomy ==
=== 2005 taxonomy ===
According to the taxonomy of Bouchet & Rocroi (2005) the family Chondrinidae has no subfamilies.

=== 2010 taxonomy ===
Kokshoorn B. & Gittenberger (2010) established a new subfamily to system of Chondrinidae:

- subfamily Chondrininae
- subfamily Granariinae

== Genera ==
- Abida Turton, 1831
- Chondrina Reichenbach, 1828
- Granaria Held, 1838
- Graniberia E. Gittenberger, Kokshoorn, Bössneck, Reijnen & Groenenberg, 2016
- Granopupa Boettger, 1889
- Rupestrella Monterosato, 1894
- Solatopupa Pilsbry, 1917

Synonyms

- Alloglossa Lindström, 1868: synonym of Chondrina Reichenbach, 1828 (objective junior synonym)
- Avenacea Fagot, 1891: synonym of Chondrina Reichenbach, 1828 (objective junior synonym)
- Modicella H. Adams & A. Adams, 1855: synonym of Chondrina Reichenbach, 1828
- Pupella Swainson, 1840: synonym of Granaria Held, 1838
- Sandahlia Westerlund, 1887: synonym of Abida W. Turton, 1831
- Stomodonta Mermet, 1843: synonym of Abida W. Turton, 1831
- Torquilla S. Studer, 1820: synonym of Abida W. Turton, 1831 (homonym; non Torquilla Brisson, 1760 [Aves])
