= Turbonilla senegalensis =

Scientific classification
- Kingdom: Animalia
- Phylum: Mollusca
- Class: Gastropoda
- Family: Pyramidellidae
- Genus: Turbonilla
- Species: T. senegalensis

Binomial name
- Turbonilla senegalensis Maltzan, 1885

Species of gastropod

Turbonilla senegalensis is a species of sea snail, a marine gastropod mollusk in the family Pyramidellidae, the pyrams and their allies.
