= Gibberula boettgeri =

Scientific classification
- Kingdom: Animalia
- Phylum: Mollusca
- Class: Gastropoda
- Subclass: Caenogastropoda
- Order: Neogastropoda
- Family: Cystiscidae
- Subfamily: Cystiscinae
- Genus: Gibberula
- Species: G. boettgeri

Binomial name
- Gibberula boettgeri (Maltzan, 1884)

Synonyms
- Marginella (Gibberula) boettgeri Maltzan, 1884; Marginella boettgeri Maltzan, 1884

Species of gastropod

Gibberula boettgeri is a species of sea snail, a marine gastropod mollusk, in the family Cystiscidae.
