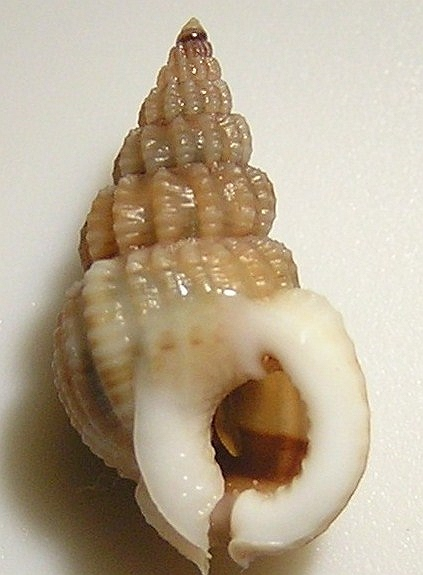
- Nassarius pachychilus

Scientific classification
- Kingdom: Animalia
- Phylum: Mollusca
- Class: Gastropoda
- Subclass: Caenogastropoda
- Order: Neogastropoda
- Family: Nassariidae
- Genus: Nassarius
- Species: N. pachychilus

Binomial name
- Nassarius pachychilus (von Maltzan, 1884)

Synonyms
- Nassa pachychilus Maltzan, 1884

= Nassarius pachychilus =

Species of gastropod

Nassarius pachychilus, the Angolan nassa, is a species of sea snail, a marine gastropod mollusc in the family Nassariidae, the Nassa mud snails or dog whelks.

== Description ==
The shell size varies between 11 mm and 20 mm.

== Distribution ==
This species occurs in the Atlantic Ocean off Senegal, Ghana and Angola.
