= Mangelia senegalensis =

Scientific classification
- Kingdom: Animalia
- Phylum: Mollusca
- Class: Gastropoda
- Subclass: Caenogastropoda
- Order: Neogastropoda
- Superfamily: Conoidea
- Family: Mangeliidae
- Genus: Mangelia
- Species: M. senegalensis

Binomial name
- Mangelia senegalensis (Maltzan, 1883)

Synonyms
- Mangilia senegalensis Maltzan, 1883 (original description)

Species of gastropod

Mangelia senegalensis is a species of sea snail, a marine gastropod mollusk in the family Mangeliidae.

== Distribution ==
This species occurs in the Atlantic Ocean off Senegal.
