= Mitromorpha separanda =

Scientific classification
- Kingdom: Animalia
- Phylum: Mollusca
- Class: Gastropoda
- Subclass: Caenogastropoda
- Order: Neogastropoda
- Family: Mitromorphidae
- Genus: Mitromorpha
- Species: M. separanda

Binomial name
- Mitromorpha separanda (Von Maltzan, 1884)

Synonyms
- Mitra separanda Von Maltzan, 1884; Mitromorpha (Mitrolumna) separanda (Von Maltzan, 1884)

Species of gastropod

Mitromorpha separanda is a species of sea snail, a marine gastropod mollusk in the family Mitromorphidae.

== Distribution ==
This marine species occurs off Senegal
