= Xerocrassa subvariegata =

Conservation status
- Least Concern (IUCN 3.1)

Scientific classification
- Kingdom: Animalia
- Phylum: Mollusca
- Class: Gastropoda
- Order: Stylommatophora
- Family: Geomitridae
- Genus: Xerocrassa
- Species: X. subvariegata

Binomial name
- Xerocrassa subvariegata (Maltzan, 1883)

Synonyms
- Helix subvariegata Maltzan, 1883 (original combination); Xerocrassa (Xerocrassa) subvariegata (Maltzan, 1883) · alternate representation

Species of gastropod

Xerocrassa subvariegata is a species of air-breathing land snail, a pulmonate gastropod mollusk in the family Geomitridae.

== Distribution ==
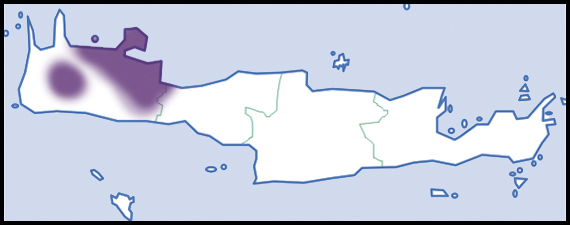
Distribution

This species is endemic to Greece, where it occurs in the north-western part of the island of Crete.

== See also ==
- List of non-marine molluscs of Greece
