= Xerocrassa nicosiana =

Conservation status
- Least Concern (IUCN 3.1)

Scientific classification
- Kingdom: Animalia
- Phylum: Mollusca
- Class: Gastropoda
- Order: Stylommatophora
- Family: Geomitridae
- Genus: Xerocrassa
- Species: X. nicosiana

Binomial name
- Xerocrassa nicosiana (Gittenberger, 1991)
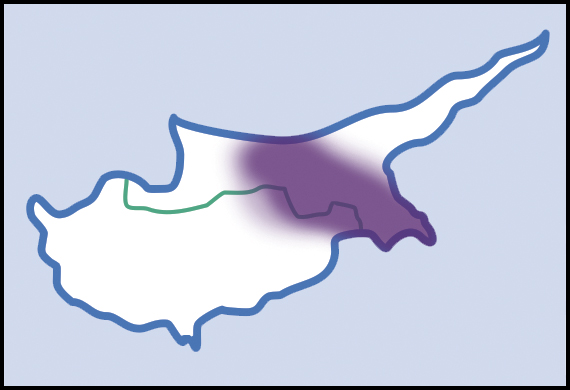

Synonyms
- Trochoidea (Xerocrassa) nicosiana E. Gittenberger, 1991 (original combination); Xerocrassa (Xerocrassa) nicosiana (E. Gittenberger, 1991) · alternate representation

Species of gastropod

Xerocrassa nicosiana is a species of air-breathing land snail, a pulmonate gastropod mollusc in the family Geomitridae. Adults measure 11–19 mm wide and 9–15 mm tall. The spherical shell is glossy whitish, with spirally-arranged horn-brown bands that are arranged irregularly and frequently interrupted. The snail is endemic to Cyprus, where it occurs mainly on the central part of the island. It is a terrestrial species that inhabits dry xeric shrubland. It is listed as being of least concern on the IUCN Red List as it is thought to be common and faces no evident threats.

== Taxonomy ==
Xerocrassa nicosiana was described as Trochoidea (Xerocrassa) nicosiana in 1991 by E. Gittenberger based on specimens from Nicosia, Cyprus.

== Description ==
Xerocrassa nicosiana adults measure 11–19 mm wide and 9–15 mm tall. The spherical shell is glossy whitish, with spirally-arranged horn-brown bands that are arranged irregularly and frequently interrupted. The shell has a low low conical spire and 4–6 flattened whorls. Juveniles have keeled peripheries. The last whorl has the first half angulated and is descending in front near the aperture. The aperture is round or slightly oval, with a thickened lip inside. The umbilicus is narrow, less than a tenth of the body width, and eccentric. The whorls of the teleoconch have dense irregular ribbing. In immatures, the vagina is twice as long as the penis.

Compared to Xerocrassa cretica, the present species has a narrower umbilicus, lower aperture, thicker apertural lip, glossier shell, and somewhat higher spire.

== Distribution ==
This species is endemic to Cyprus, where it occurs mainly on the central part of the island. It has been reported from Nicosia and Larnaca districts. It is a terrestrial species that inhabits dry xeric shrubland.

== Conservation ==
It is listed as being of least concern on the IUCN Red List as it is thought to be common and faces no evident threats. Overgrazing and fires are possible threats.
