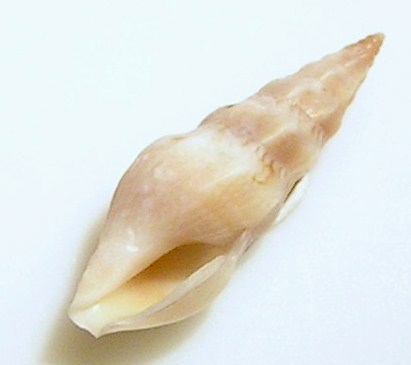
- Apertural view of a shell of Crassispira laevisulcata

Scientific classification
- Kingdom: Animalia
- Phylum: Mollusca
- Class: Gastropoda
- Subclass: Caenogastropoda
- Order: Neogastropoda
- Superfamily: Conoidea
- Family: Pseudomelatomidae
- Genus: Crassispira
- Species: C. laevisulcata

Binomial name
- Crassispira laevisulcata Von Maltzan, 1883

= Crassispira laevisulcata =

Species of gastropod

Crassispira laevisulcata is a species of sea snail, a marine gastropod mollusk in the family Pseudomelatomidae.

== Description ==
The shells of most species of sea snails are spirally coiled. The length of the shell varies between 13 mm and 20 mm.

== Distribution ==
This marine species occurs off Morocco and Senegal.
