= Xerocrassa siderensis =

Conservation status
- Least Concern (IUCN 3.1)

Scientific classification
- Kingdom: Animalia
- Phylum: Mollusca
- Class: Gastropoda
- Order: Stylommatophora
- Family: Geomitridae
- Genus: Xerocrassa
- Species: X. siderensis

Binomial name
- Xerocrassa siderensis (Maltzan, 1883)

Synonyms
- Helix (Jacosta) euphacodes Maltzan, 1883 (junior synonym); Helix (Jacosta) siderensis Maltzan, 1883 (original combination); Xerocrassa euphacodes (Maltzan, 1883); Xerocrassa (Xerocrassa) siderensis (Maltzan, 1883) · alternate representation

Species of gastropod

Xerocrassa siderensis is a species of air-breathing land snail, a pulmonate gastropod mollusk in the family Geomitridae.

== Distribution ==
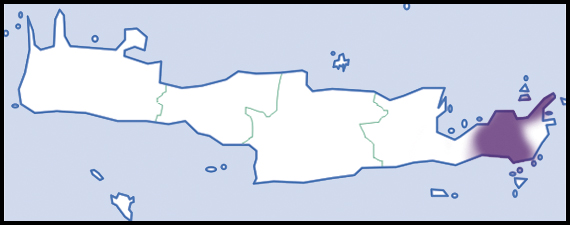
Distribution

This species is endemic to Greece, where it is restricted to the easternmost mountain range of Crete, commonly occurring near the eastern coast of the island.

== See also ==
- List of non-marine molluscs of Greece
