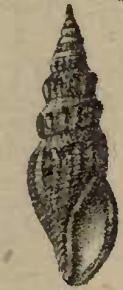
- Drawing of a shell of Drillia tripter

Scientific classification
- Kingdom: Animalia
- Phylum: Mollusca
- Class: Gastropoda
- Subclass: Caenogastropoda
- Order: Neogastropoda
- Superfamily: Conoidea
- Family: Drilliidae
- Genus: Drillia
- Species: D. tripter

Binomial name
- Drillia tripter Von Maltzan, 1883

Synonyms
- Crassispira tripter Maltzan, H.F. von, 1883; Pleurotoma tripter Paetel, 1888

= Drillia tripter =

Species of gastropod

Drillia tripter is a species of sea snail, a marine gastropod mollusk in the family Drilliidae.

== Description ==
The light violaceous shell has a wide and shallow anal sinus. The length of the shell varies between 11 mm and 23 mm.

== Distribution ==
This species occurs in the demersal zone of the Atlantic Ocean off West Africa (Senegal, Ghana)
