= Xerocrassa amphiconus =

Conservation status
- Least Concern (IUCN 3.1)

Scientific classification
- Kingdom: Animalia
- Phylum: Mollusca
- Class: Gastropoda
- Order: Stylommatophora
- Family: Geomitridae
- Genus: Xerocrassa
- Species: X. amphiconus

Binomial name
- Xerocrassa amphiconus (Maltzan, 1883)

Synonyms
- Helix (Jacosta) amphiconus Maltzan, 1883; Xerocrassa (Xerocrassa) amphiconus (Maltzan, 1883) · alternate representation

Species of gastropod

Xerocrassa amphiconus is a species of air-breathing land snail, a pulmonate gastropod mollusk in the family Geomitridae.

== Distribution ==
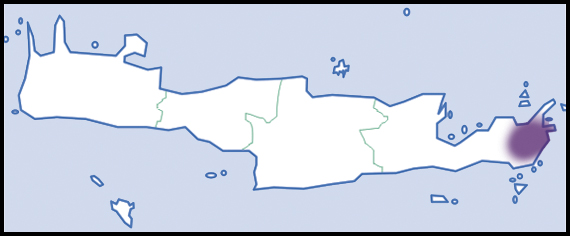
Distribution

This species is endemic to Greece, where it is restricted to the easternmost mountain range of Crete. As adults, these snails can grow to a size of 4–6 x 9–12 mm.

== See also ==
- List of non-marine molluscs of Greece
