= Fusinus boettgeri =

Scientific classification
- Kingdom: Animalia
- Phylum: Mollusca
- Class: Gastropoda
- Subclass: Caenogastropoda
- Order: Neogastropoda
- Family: Fasciolariidae
- Genus: Fusinus
- Species: F. boettgeri

Binomial name
- Fusinus boettgeri (von Maltzan, 1884)

Synonyms
- Fusus boettgeri von Maltzan, 1884

Species of gastropod

Fusinus boettgeri is a species of sea snail, a marine gastropod mollusc in the family Fasciolariidae, the spindle snails, the tulip snails and their allies.
