= Xerocrassa rhithymna =

Conservation status
- Least Concern (IUCN 3.1)

Scientific classification
- Kingdom: Animalia
- Phylum: Mollusca
- Class: Gastropoda
- Order: Stylommatophora
- Family: Geomitridae
- Genus: Xerocrassa
- Species: X. rhithymna

Binomial name
- Xerocrassa rhithymna Hausdorf & Sauer, 2009

Synonyms
- Xerocrassa (Xerocrassa) rhithymna Hausdorf & Sauer, 2009 · alternate representation

Species of gastropod

Xerocrassa rhithymna is a species of air-breathing land snail, a pulmonate gastropod mollusk in the family Geomitridae.

== Distribution ==
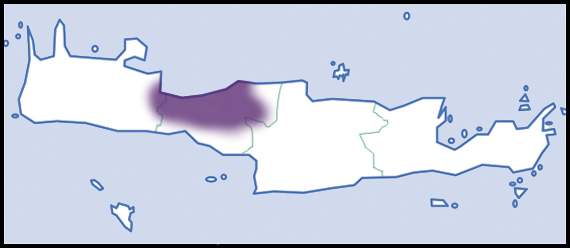
Distribution

This species is endemic to Greece, where it is restricted to the northern part of the island of Crete, between the Lefka Ori and the Psiloriti mountains.

== See also ==
- List of non-marine molluscs of Greece
