= Xerocrassa derogata =

Conservation status
- Least Concern (IUCN 3.1)

Scientific classification
- Kingdom: Animalia
- Phylum: Mollusca
- Class: Gastropoda
- Order: Stylommatophora
- Family: Geomitridae
- Genus: Xerocrassa
- Species: X. derogata

Binomial name
- Xerocrassa derogata (Rossmässler, 1854)

Synonyms
- Helix derogata Rossmässler, 1854 (original combination); Xerocrassa (Amandana) derogata (Rossmässler, 1854) · alternate representation

Species of gastropod

Xerocrassa derogata is a species of air-breathing land snail, a pulmonate gastropod mollusk in the family Geomitridae.

== Distribution ==
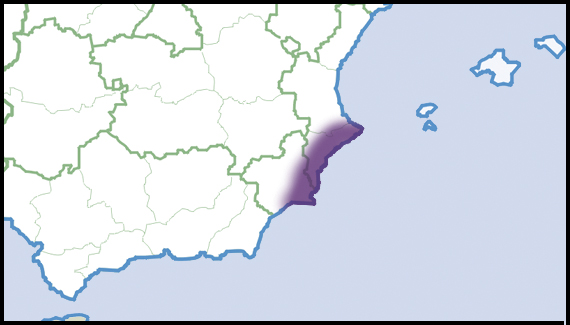
Distribution

This species is endemic to Spain, where it occurs in the provinces of Alicante, Valencia and Murcia.
