= Xerocrassa grata =

Conservation status
- Data Deficient (IUCN 3.1)

Scientific classification
- Kingdom: Animalia
- Phylum: Mollusca
- Class: Gastropoda
- Order: Stylommatophora
- Family: Geomitridae
- Genus: Xerocrassa
- Species: X. grata

Binomial name
- Xerocrassa grata (Haas, 1924)

Synonyms
- Helicopsis murcica grata Haas, 1924; Xerocrassa (Amandana) grata (F. Haas, 1924) · alternate representation

Species of gastropod

Xerocrassa grata is a species of air-breathing land snail, a pulmonate gastropod mollusk in the family Geomitridae.

== Distribution ==
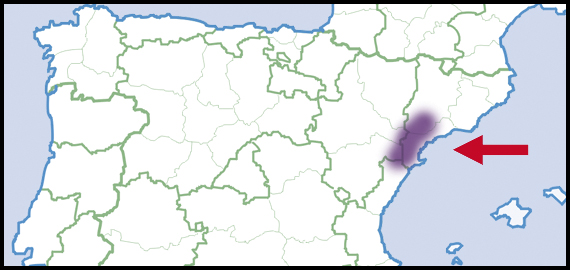
Distribution

This species is endemic to the southern half of the province of Tarragona in Catalonia, Spain.
