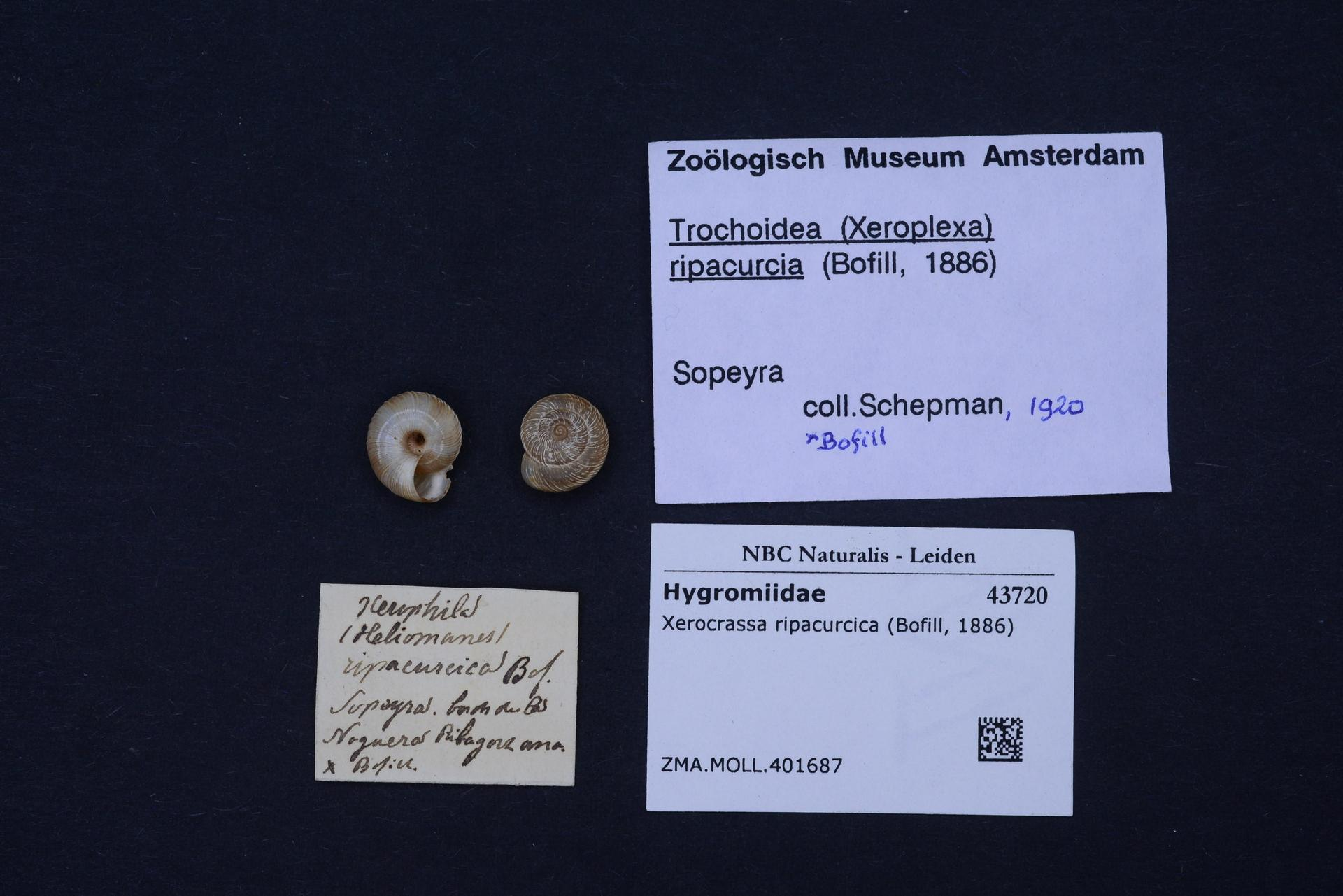
- Preserved specimen

Conservation status
- Least Concern (IUCN 3.1)

Scientific classification
- Kingdom: Animalia
- Phylum: Mollusca
- Class: Gastropoda
- Order: Stylommatophora
- Family: Geomitridae
- Genus: Xerocrassa
- Species: X. ripacurcica

Binomial name
- Xerocrassa ripacurcica (Bofill, 1886)

Synonyms
- Helix ripacurcica Bofill, 1886; Helix subiberica Fagot, 1888 (junior synonym); Helicopsis gigaxii Haas, 1924; Xerocrassa (Amandana) ripacurcica (Bofill, 1886) · alternate representation

= Xerocrassa ripacurcica =

Species of gastropod

Xerocrassa ripacurcica is a species of air-breathing land snail, a pulmonate gastropod mollusk in the family Geomitridae.

Subspecies

- Xerocrassa ripacurcica montsicciana (Bofill, 1890)
- Xerocrassa ripacurcica oreina (Fagot, 1888)
- Xerocrassa ripacurcica ripacurcica (Bofill, 1886)

== Distribution ==
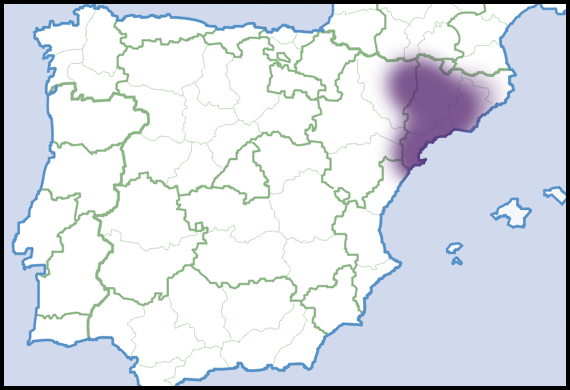
Distribution

This species is native to France and Spain.
