= Xerocrassa heraklea =

Conservation status
- Least Concern (IUCN 3.1)

Scientific classification
- Kingdom: Animalia
- Phylum: Mollusca
- Class: Gastropoda
- Order: Stylommatophora
- Family: Geomitridae
- Genus: Xerocrassa
- Species: X. heraklea

Binomial name
- Xerocrassa heraklea Hausdorf & Sauer, 2009

Synonyms
- Xerocrassa (Xerocrassa) heraklea Hausdorf & Sauer, 2009 · alternate representation

Species of gastropod

Xerocrassa heraklea is a species of air-breathing land snail, a pulmonate gastropod mollusk in the family Geomitridae.

== Distribution ==
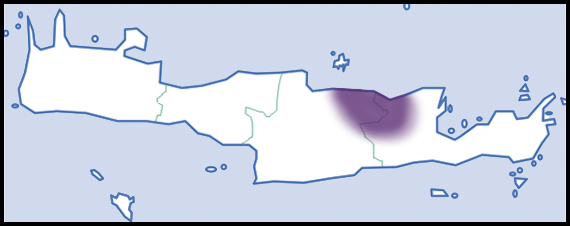
Distribution

This species is endemic to Greece, where it occurs in northern Crete, from Tombrouk, east of Iraklion, in the west to the Lasithi Plateau in the east.

== See also ==
- List of non-marine molluscs of Greece
