= Xerocrassa mesostena =

Conservation status
- Least Concern (IUCN 3.1)

Scientific classification
- Kingdom: Animalia
- Phylum: Mollusca
- Class: Gastropoda
- Order: Stylommatophora
- Family: Geomitridae
- Genus: Xerocrassa
- Species: X. mesostena

Binomial name
- Xerocrassa mesostena (Westerlund, 1879)

Synonyms
- Helix (Jacosta) sphakiota Maltzan, 1883 (junior synonym); Helix (Xerophila) mesostena Westerlund, 1879 (original combination); Helix psiloritana Maltzan, 1883 (junior synonym); Xerocrassa (Xerocrassa) mesostena (Westerlund, 1879) · alternate representation; Xerocrassa psiloritana (Maltzan, 1883); Xerocrassa sphakiota (Maltzan, 1883)

Species of gastropod

Xerocrassa mesostena is a species of air-breathing land snail, a pulmonate gastropod mollusk in the family Geomitridae.

== Distribution ==
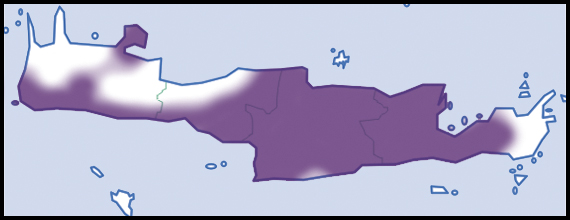
Distribution

This species is endemic to Greece, where it occurs across almost the whole island of Crete, except from the eastern and north-western tip, and the region between Chania and the Psiloritis mountains.

== See also ==
- List of non-marine molluscs of Greece
