= Xerocrassa cisternasi =

Conservation status
- Near Threatened (IUCN 3.1)

Scientific classification
- Kingdom: Animalia
- Phylum: Mollusca
- Class: Gastropoda
- Order: Stylommatophora
- Family: Geomitridae
- Genus: Xerocrassa
- Species: X. cisternasi

Binomial name
- Xerocrassa cisternasi (Hidalgo, 1883)

Synonyms
- Helix cisternasi Hidalgo, 1883 (orig. comb.); Xerocrassa (Amandana) cisternasi (Hidalgo, 1883) · alternate representation

Species of gastropod

Xerocrassa cisternasi is a species of air-breathing land snail, a pulmonate gastropod mollusk in the family Geomitridae.

The species joined at least 10 subspecies

- Xerocrassa cisternasi calasaladae (Jaeckel, 1952)
- Xerocrassa cisternasi calderensis (Gasull, 1964)
- Xerocrassa cisternasi canae (Jaeckel, 1952)
- Xerocrassa cisternasi cisternasi (Hidalgo, 1883)
- Xerocrassa cisternasi conjungens (S. H. F. Jaeckel, 1952)
- Xerocrassa cisternasi hortae (Schröder, 1978)
- Xerocrassa cisternasi margaritae (Jaeckel, 1952)
- Xerocrassa cisternasi mesquidae (Schröder, 1978)
- Xerocrassa cisternasi muradae (Jaeckel, 1952)
- Xerocrassa cisternasi ortizi (Gasull, 1964)
- Xerocrassa cisternasi redonae (Jaeckel, 1952)
- Xerocrassa cisternasi scopulicola (Bofill & Aguilar-Amat, 1924)
- Xerocrassa cisternasi vedrae (S. H. F. Jaeckel, 1952)
- Xerocrassa cisternasi vedranellensis (S. H. F. Jaeckel, 1952)

== Distribution ==
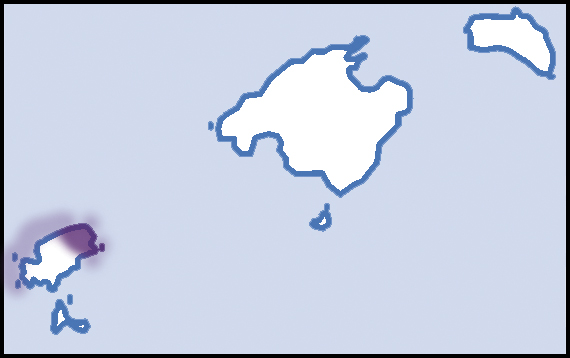
Distribution

This species is endemic to Spain, where it is restricted to the north-eastern part of the island of Ibiza and the surrounding islets.
