= Xerocrassa edmundi =

Conservation status
- Endangered (IUCN 3.1)

Scientific classification
- Kingdom: Animalia
- Phylum: Mollusca
- Class: Gastropoda
- Order: Stylommatophora
- Family: Geomitridae
- Genus: Xerocrassa
- Species: X. edmundi

Binomial name
- Xerocrassa edmundi Martínez-Ortí, 2006

Synonyms
- Xerocrassa (Amandana) edmundi Martínez-Ortí, 2006 · alternate representation

Species of gastropod

Xerocrassa edmundi is a species of air-breathing land snail, a pulmonate gastropod mollusk in the family Geomitridae.

== Distribution ==
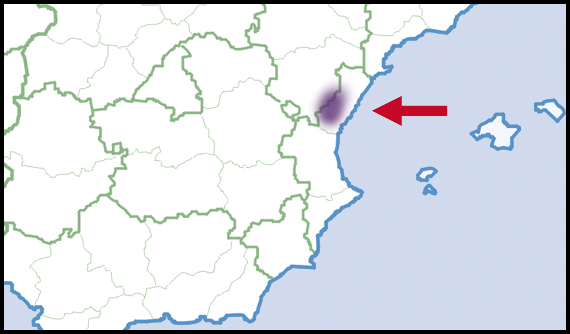
Distribution

This species is endemic to Spain, where it occurs in the nature reserve of the Serra d'Espadà in the Castellón province of the Valencian autonomous community.
