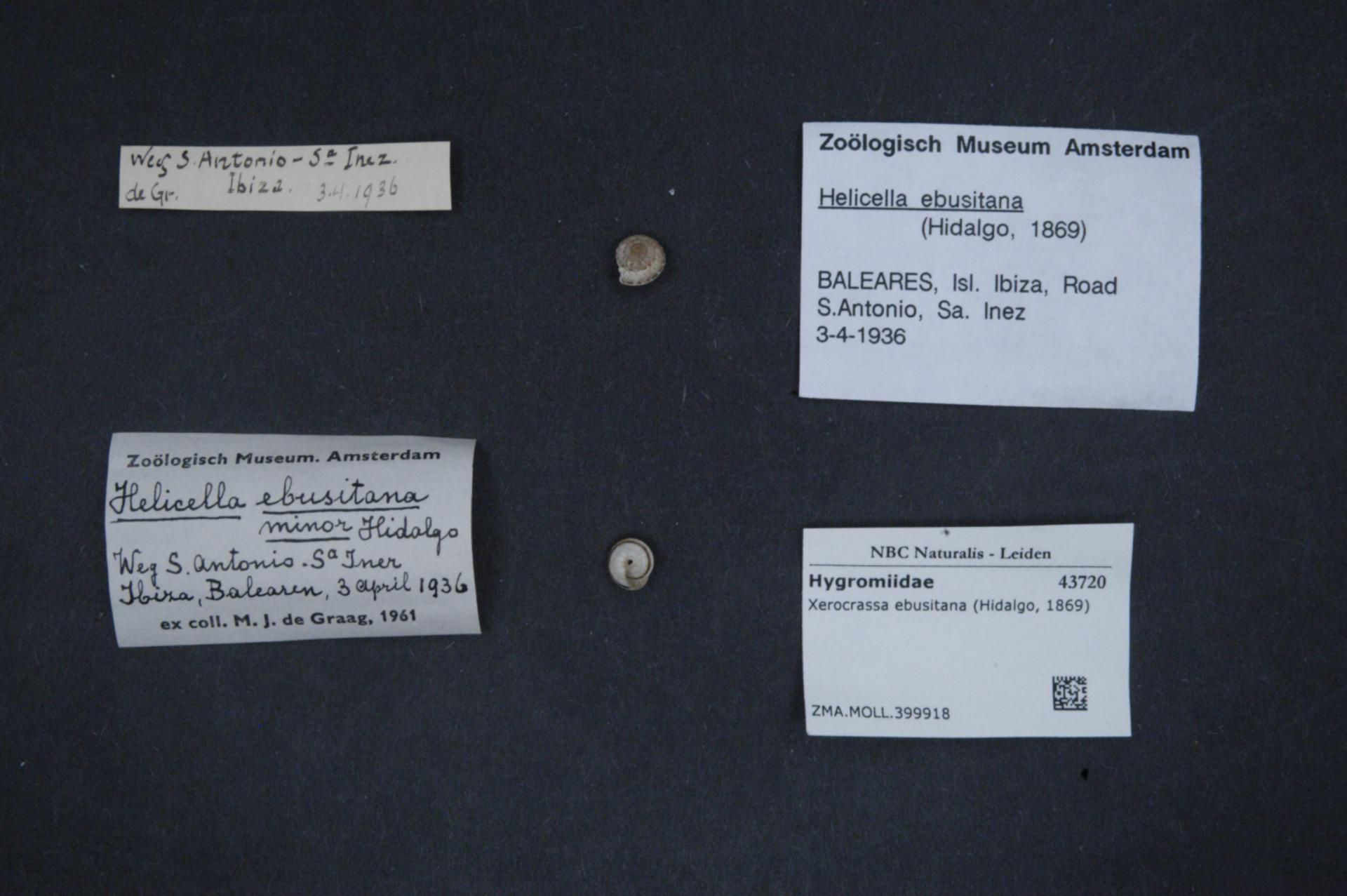
- Shell of Xerocrassa ebusitiana (specimen at Naturalis Biodiversity Center)

Conservation status
- Near Threatened (IUCN 3.1)

Scientific classification
- Kingdom: Animalia
- Phylum: Mollusca
- Class: Gastropoda
- Order: Stylommatophora
- Family: Geomitridae
- Genus: Xerocrassa
- Species: X. ebusitana

Binomial name
- Xerocrassa ebusitana (Hidalgo, 1869)

Synonyms
- Helix ebusitana Hidalgo, 1869 (original combination); Xerocrassa (Amandana) ebusitana (Hidalgo, 1869) · alternate representation; Xerocrassa (Amandana) ebusitana ebusitana (Hidalgo, 1869) (superseded combination)

= Xerocrassa ebusitana =

Species of gastropod

Xerocrassa ebusitana is a species of air-breathing land snail, a pulmonate gastropod mollusk in the family Geomitridae.

== Distribution ==
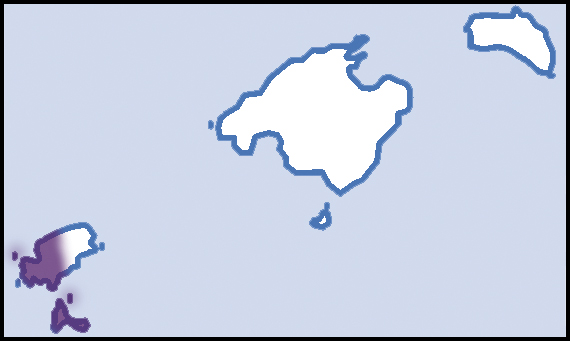
Distribution

This species is endemic to Spain, where it occurs on the Balearic Islands of Ibiza and Formentera and their surrounding minor islands.
