= Xerocrassa roblesi =

Conservation status
- Vulnerable (IUCN 3.1)

Scientific classification
- Kingdom: Animalia
- Phylum: Mollusca
- Class: Gastropoda
- Order: Stylommatophora
- Family: Geomitridae
- Genus: Xerocrassa
- Species: X. roblesi

Binomial name
- Xerocrassa roblesi (Martínez-Ortí, 2000)

Synonyms
- Trochoidea roblesi Martínez-Ortí, 2000; Xerocrassa (Amandana) roblesi (Martínez-Ortí, 2000) · alternate representation

Species of gastropod

Xerocrassa roblesi is a species of air-breathing land snail, a pulmonate gastropod mollusk belonging to the Geomitridae family.

== Distribution ==
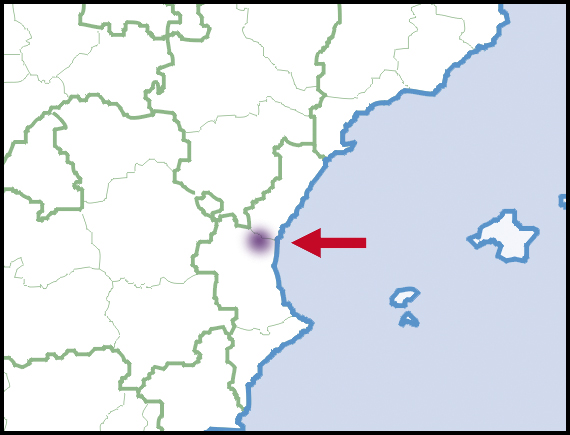
Distribution

This species is endemic to Spain, where it is restricted to the natural reserve of the Serra Calderona in the north of the province of Valencia.
