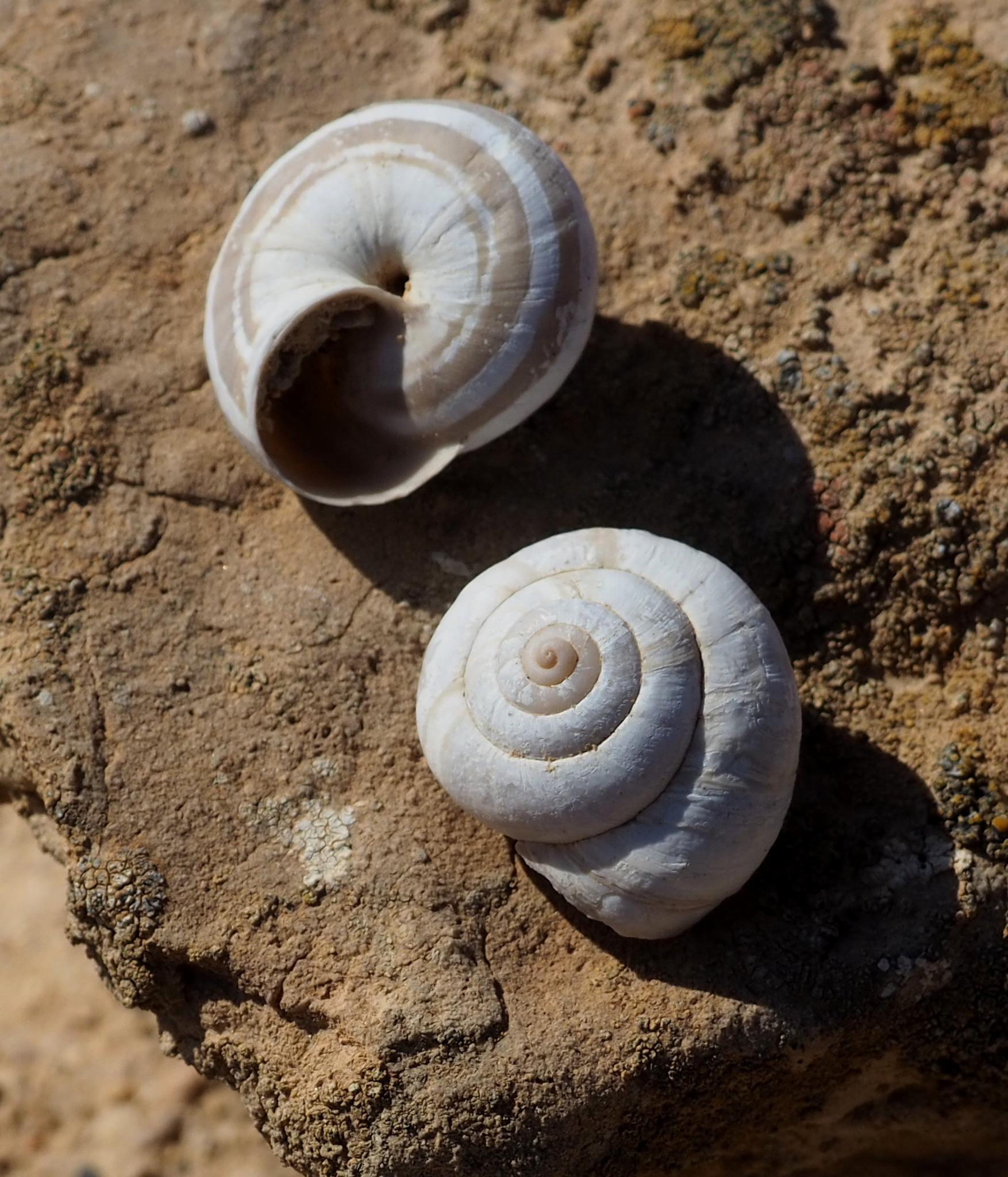
- Shell of Xerocrassa simulata

Scientific classification
- Kingdom: Animalia
- Phylum: Mollusca
- Class: Gastropoda
- Order: Stylommatophora
- Family: Geomitridae
- Genus: Xerocrassa
- Species: X. simulata

Binomial name
- Xerocrassa simulata Ehrenberg, 1831

Synonyms
- Helix simulata Ehrenberg, 1831 (original combination); Xerocrassa (Xerocrassa) simulata (Ehrenberg, 1831) · alternate representation; Xerophila (Ereminella) simulata (Ehrenberg, 1831); Xerophila simulata (Ehrenberg, 1831) (superseded generic combination)

= Xerocrassa simulata =

Species of gastropod

Xerocrassa simulata is a species of air-breathing land snail, a terrestrial pulmonate gastropod mollusk in the family Geomitridae. It is adapted to the Mediterranean climate regime.

== Distribution ==
This species is common in the deserts and semideserts of the levantine region. Morphology varies greatly with locality.

== Life cycle ==
The size of the egg of this species is 2.6 × 2.1 mm.
