= Xerocrassa subrogata =

Conservation status
- Least Concern (IUCN 3.1)

Scientific classification
- Kingdom: Animalia
- Phylum: Mollusca
- Class: Gastropoda
- Order: Stylommatophora
- Family: Geomitridae
- Genus: Xerocrassa
- Species: X. subrogata

Binomial name
- Xerocrassa subrogata (Pfeiffer, 1853)

Synonyms
- Helicopsis murcica (A. Schmidt, 1854) (invalid; based on a preoccupied original name); Helix subrogata Pfeiffer, 1853; Xerocrassa (Amandana) subrogata (L. Pfeiffer, 1853) · alternate representation

Species of gastropod

Xerocrassa subrogata is a species of air-breathing land snail, a pulmonate gastropod mollusk in the family Geomitridae.

== Distribution ==
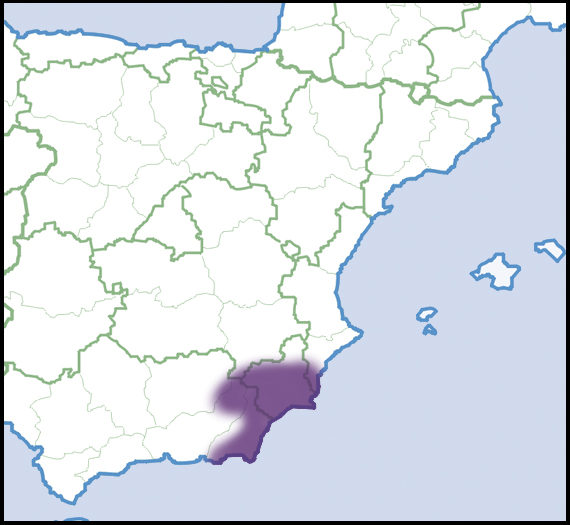
Distribution

This species is endemic to Spain, where it is widely distributed in the eastern provinces of the country.
