= Xerocrassa newka =

Conservation status
- Near Threatened (IUCN 3.1)

Scientific classification
- Kingdom: Animalia
- Phylum: Mollusca
- Class: Gastropoda
- Order: Stylommatophora
- Family: Geomitridae
- Genus: Xerocrassa
- Species: X. newka

Binomial name
- Xerocrassa newka (Jaeckel, 1952)

Synonyms
- Helicella frater ferreri S. H. F. Jaeckel, 1952 (basionym); Helix majoricensis Dohrn & Heynemann, 1862 junior subjective synonym; Helix newka Dohrn & Heynemann, 1862 (basionym); Xerocrassa (Amandana) ferreri (S. H. F. Jaeckel, 1952) · alternate representation; Xerocrassa (Amandana) ferreri ferreri (Jaeckel, 1952) superseded combination; Xerocrassa (Amandana) ferreri pobrensis (Gasull, 1964) superseded combination; Xerocrassa (Amandana) newka (Dohrn & Heynemann, 1862) · alternate representation; Xerocrassa ferreri (Jaeckel, 1952) junior subjective synonym; Xerocrassa ferreri ferreri (Jaeckel, 1952) superseded combination; Xerocrassa ferreri pobrensis (Gasull, 1964) superseded combination

Species of gastropod

Xerocrassa newka is a species of air-breathing land snail, a pulmonate gastropod mollusk in the family Geomitridae.

== Distribution ==
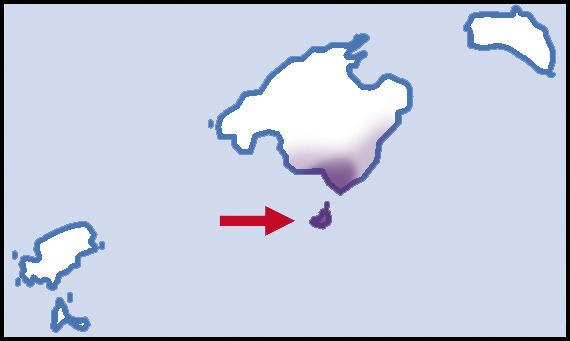
Distribution

This species is endemic to the Balearic Islands in Spain.
