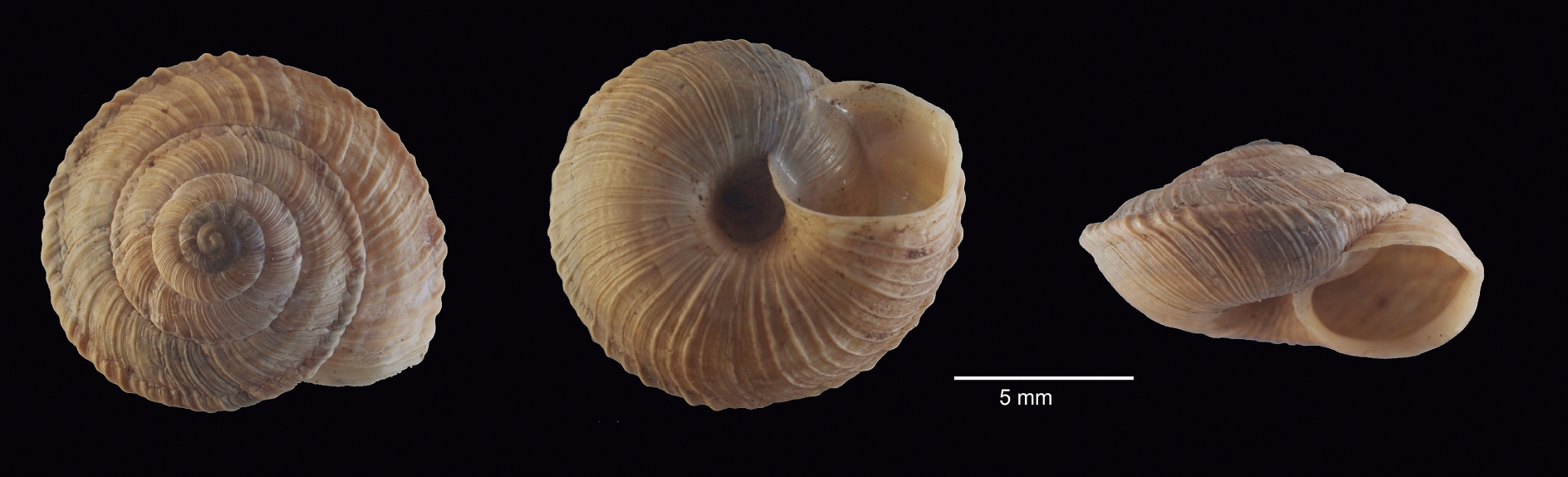

Conservation status
- Endangered (IUCN 3.1)

Scientific classification
- Kingdom: Animalia
- Phylum: Mollusca
- Class: Gastropoda
- Order: Stylommatophora
- Family: Geomitridae
- Genus: Xerocrassa
- Species: X. montserratensis

Binomial name
- Xerocrassa montserratensis (Hidalgo, 1870)

Synonyms
- Helix montserratensis Hidalgo, 1870; Helix montserratensis var. betulonensis Bofill, 1879 (junior synonym); Helix montserratensis var. delicatula Bofill, 1898 (junior synonym); Trochoidea montserratensis (Hidalgo, 1870); Xerocrassa (Amandana) montserratensis (Hidalgo, 1870) · alternate representation; Xerocrassa (Amandana) montserratensis betulonensis (Bofill, 1879); Xerocrassa (Amandana) montserratensis montserratensis (Hidalgo, 1870) · alternate representation; Xerocrassa montserratensis betulonensis (Bofill, 1879) (junior synonym); Xerocrassa montserratensis delicatula Bofill, 1898; Xerocrassa montserratensis montserratensis (Hidalgo, 1870)

= Xerocrassa montserratensis =

Species of gastropod

Xerocrassa montserratensis is a species of air-breathing land snail, a pulmonate gastropod mollusk in the family Geomitridae, the hairy snails and their allies.

Two subspecies are recognised, the nominotypical X. m. subsp. montserratensis and X. m. subsp. betulonensis.

== Geographic distribution ==
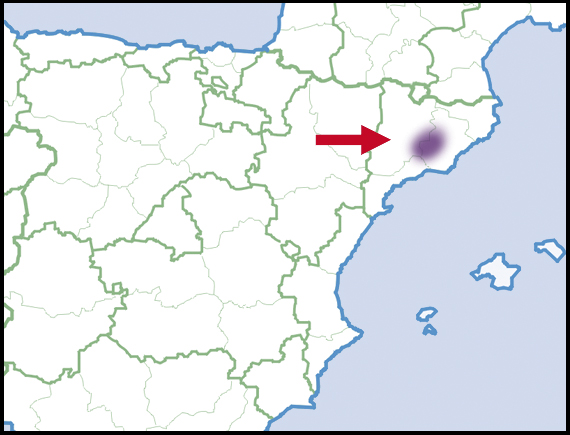
Distribution

Xerocrassa montserratensis is endemic to Spain, where it is restricted to the Montserrat mountain chain and the mountains of the Besòs river basin in the Catalan province of Barcelona.
