= Xerocrassa claudia =

Conservation status
- Least Concern (IUCN 3.1)

Scientific classification
- Kingdom: Animalia
- Phylum: Mollusca
- Class: Gastropoda
- Order: Stylommatophora
- Family: Geomitridae
- Genus: Xerocrassa
- Species: X. claudia

Binomial name
- Xerocrassa claudia Hausdorf & Welter-Schultes, 1998

Synonyms
- Xerocrassa (Xerocrassa) claudia Hausdorf & Welter-Schultes, 1998 · alternate representation

Species of gastropod

Xerocrassa claudia is a species of air-breathing land snail, a pulmonate gastropod mollusk in the family Geomitridae.

== Distribution ==
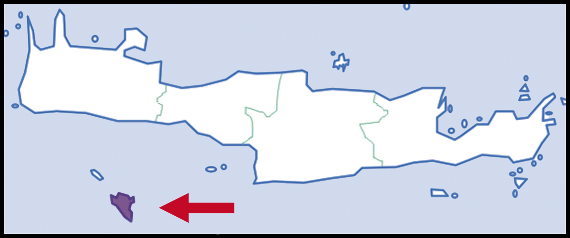
Distribution

This species is endemic to the island of Gavdos in Greece.

== See also ==
- List of non-marine molluscs of Greece
