= Xerocrassa jimenensis =

Conservation status
- Near Threatened (IUCN 3.1)

Scientific classification
- Kingdom: Animalia
- Phylum: Mollusca
- Class: Gastropoda
- Order: Stylommatophora
- Family: Geomitridae
- Genus: Xerocrassa
- Species: X. jimenensis

Binomial name
- Xerocrassa jimenensis (Puente & Arrébola, 1996)

Synonyms
- Trochoidea jimenensis Puente & Arrébola, 1996; Trochoidea (Xerocrassa) jimenensis Puente & Arrébola, 1996 (original combination); Xerocrassa (Amandana) jimenensis (Puente & Arrébola, 1996) · alternate representation

Species of gastropod

Xerocrassa jimenensis is a species of air-breathing land snail, a pulmonate gastropod mollusk in the family Geomitridae.

== Distribution ==
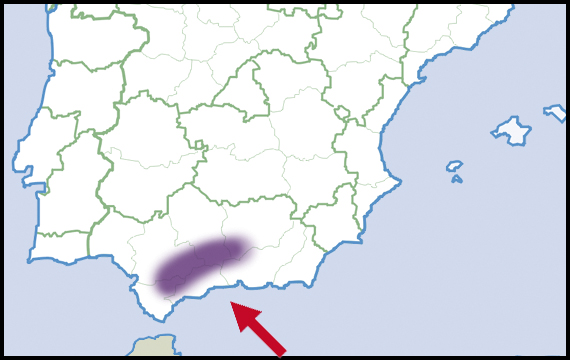
Distribution

This species is endemic to the provinces of Cádiz, Málaga and Seville in Andalusia, southern Spain.
