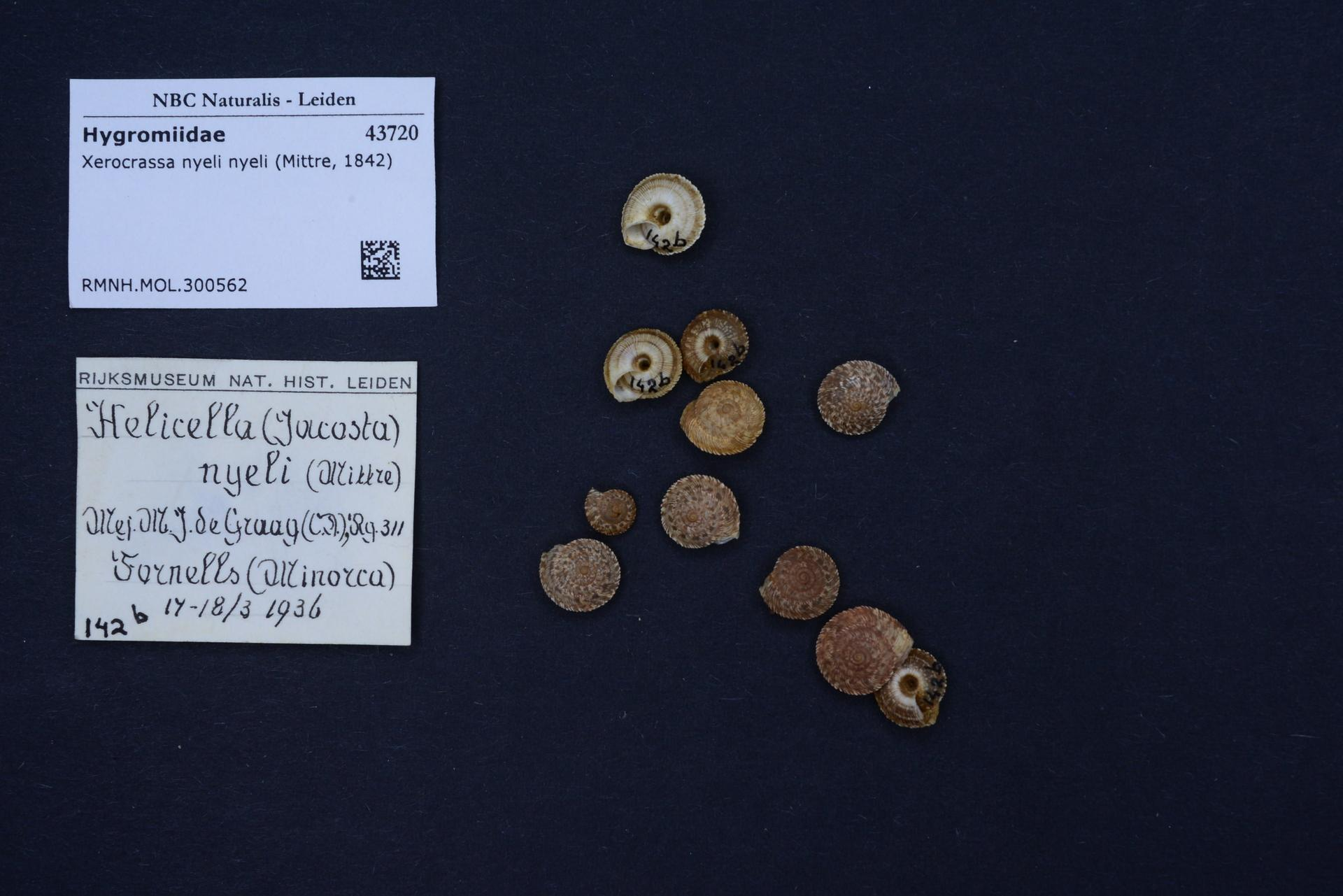

Conservation status
- Near Threatened (IUCN 3.1)

Scientific classification
- Kingdom: Animalia
- Phylum: Mollusca
- Class: Gastropoda
- Order: Stylommatophora
- Family: Geomitridae
- Genus: Xerocrassa
- Species: X. nyeli

Binomial name
- Xerocrassa nyeli (Mittre, 1842)

Synonyms
- Helix cardonae Hidalgo, 1867 junior subjective synonym (original combination); Helix nyeli Mittre, 1842; Xerocrassa (Amandana) nyeli (Mittre, 1842) · alternate representation; Xerocrassa (Amandana) nyeli (Mittre, 1842) · alternate representation; Xerocrassa (Amandana) nyeli nyeli (Mittre, 1842) · alternate representation; Xerocrassa cardonae (Hidalgo, 1867) superseded combination

= Xerocrassa nyeli =

Species of gastropod

Xerocrassa nyeli is a species of air-breathing land snail, a pulmonate gastropod mollusk in the family Geomitridae.

Subspecies

- Xerocrassa nyeli nyeli (Mittre, 1842)
- Xerocrassa nyeli ponsi (Hidalgo, 1878)

== Distribution ==
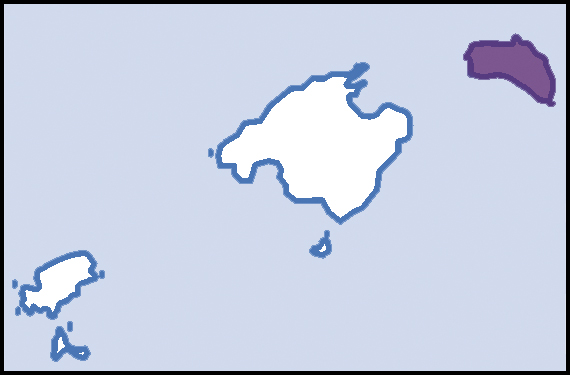
Distribution

This species is endemic to Spain, where it is restricted to the Balearic island of Menorca.
