= Xerocrassa turolensis =

Conservation status
- Near Threatened (IUCN 3.1)

Scientific classification
- Kingdom: Animalia
- Phylum: Mollusca
- Class: Gastropoda
- Order: Stylommatophora
- Family: Geomitridae
- Genus: Xerocrassa
- Species: X. turolensis

Binomial name
- Xerocrassa turolensis (Ortiz de Zárate, 1963)

Synonyms
- Helicella ribasica turolensis Ortiz de Zárate, 1963

Species of gastropod

Xerocrassa turolensis is a species of air-breathing land snail, a pulmonate gastropod mollusk in the family Geomitridae. This species is endemic to Spain, where it is restricted to the province of Teruel in the Aragon region.
