= Xerocrassa ripacurcica ripacurcica =

Scientific classification
- Kingdom: Animalia
- Phylum: Mollusca
- Class: Gastropoda
- Order: Stylommatophora
- Family: Geomitridae
- Genus: Xerocrassa
- Species: X. r. ripacurcica

Binomial name
- Xerocrassa ripacurcica ripacurcica (Haas, 1924)

Synonyms
- Helicopsis gigaxii arturi F. Haas, 1924 (basionym); Xerocrassa (Amandana) arturi (F. Haas, 1924) · alternate representation; Xerocrassa (Amandana) ripacurcica ripacurcica (Bofill, 1886) · alternate representation; Xerocrassa arturi (F. Haas, 1924) junior subjective synonym

Species of gastropod

Xerocrassa ripacurcica ripacurcica is a subspecies of air-breathing land snail, a pulmonate gastropod mollusk in the family Geomitridae.

== Description ==
The length of the shell attains 5 mm, its diameter 8–9 mm.

== Distribution ==
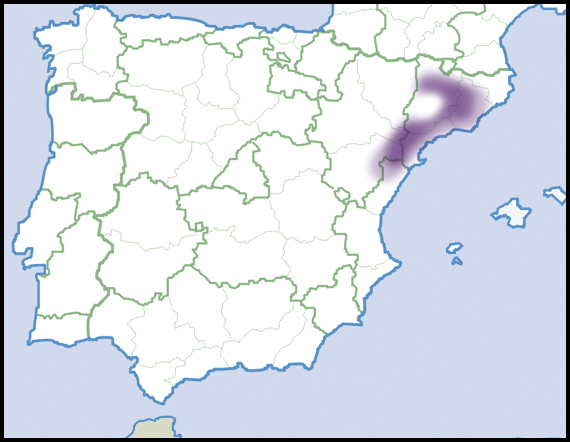
Distribution

This species is endemic to Spain, where it occurs in the mountains near the lower section of the Ebro river.
