= Xerocrassa nyeli ponsi =

Scientific classification
- Kingdom: Animalia
- Phylum: Mollusca
- Class: Gastropoda
- Order: Stylommatophora
- Family: Geomitridae
- Genus: Xerocrassa
- Species: X. nyeli
- Subspecies: X. n. ponsi

Trinomial name
- Xerocrassa nyeli ponsi (Hidalgo, 1878)

Synonyms
- Helix ponsi Hidalgo, 1878

Species of gastropod

Xerocrassa nyeli ponsi is a subspecies of air-breathing land snail, a pulmonate gastropod mollusk in the family Geomitridae.

== Distribution ==
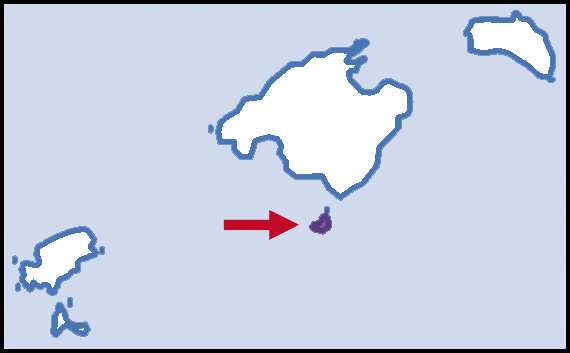
Distribution

This species is endemic to Spain, where it is restricted to the Balearic island of Cabrera.
