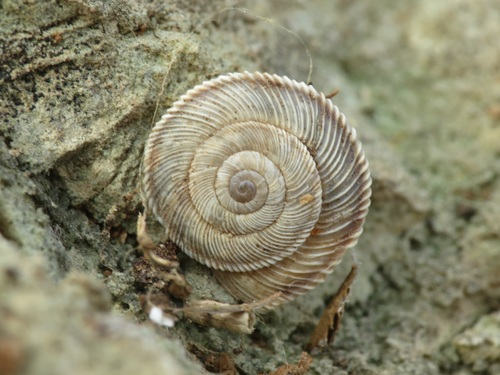
- Shell of Xerocrassa barceloi (specimen at iNaturalist)

Conservation status
- Least Concern (IUCN 3.1)

Scientific classification
- Kingdom: Animalia
- Phylum: Mollusca
- Class: Gastropoda
- Order: Stylommatophora
- Family: Geomitridae
- Genus: Xerocrassa
- Species: X. barceloi

Binomial name
- Xerocrassa barceloi (Hidalgo, 1878)

Synonyms
- Helix barceloi Hidalgo, 1878 (original combination); Xerocrassa (Amandana) barceloi (Hidalgo, 1878) · alternate representation

= Xerocrassa barceloi =

Species of gastropod

Xerocrassa barceloi is a species of air-breathing land snail, a pulmonate gastropod mollusk in the family Geomitridae.

== Distribution ==
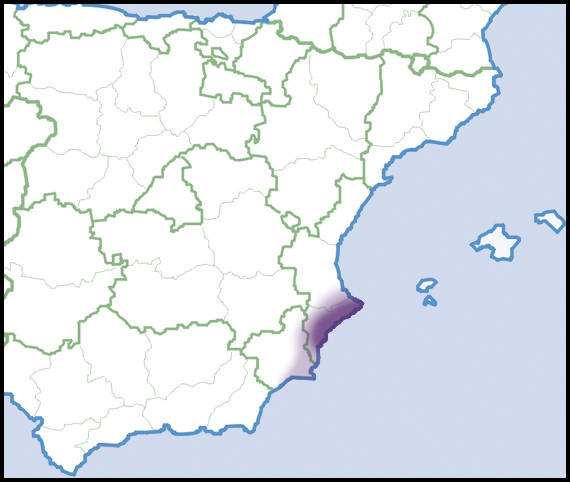
Distribution

This species is endemic to Spain, where it occurs in the province of Alicante.
