= Xerocrassa claudinae =

Scientific classification
- Domain: Eukaryota
- Kingdom: Animalia
- Phylum: Mollusca
- Class: Gastropoda
- Order: Stylommatophora
- Family: Geomitridae
- Genus: Xerocrassa
- Species: X. claudinae

Binomial name
- Xerocrassa claudinae (Gasull, 1964)

Synonyms
- Helicella (Xeropicta) claudinae Gasull, 1964 superseded combination (basionym); Xerocrassa (Amandana) claudinae (Gasull, 1964) · alternate representation

Species of gastropod

Xerocrassa claudinae is a species of air-breathing land snail, a pulmonate gastropod mollusk in the family Geomitridae.

== Distribution ==
This species is endemic to Mallorca, Spain.
