= Xerocrassa cobosi =

Conservation status
- Data Deficient (IUCN 3.1)

Scientific classification
- Kingdom: Animalia
- Phylum: Mollusca
- Class: Gastropoda
- Order: Stylommatophora
- Family: Geomitridae
- Genus: Xerocrassa
- Species: X. cobosi

Binomial name
- Xerocrassa cobosi (Ortiz de Zárate López, 1962)

Synonyms
- Helicella cobosi Ortiz de Zárate López, 1962 (original combination); Xerocrassa (Amandana) cobosi (Ortiz de Zárate López, 1962) · alternate representation

Species of gastropod

Xerocrassa cobosi is a species of air-breathing land snail, a pulmonate gastropod mollusk in the family Geomitridae.

== Distribution ==
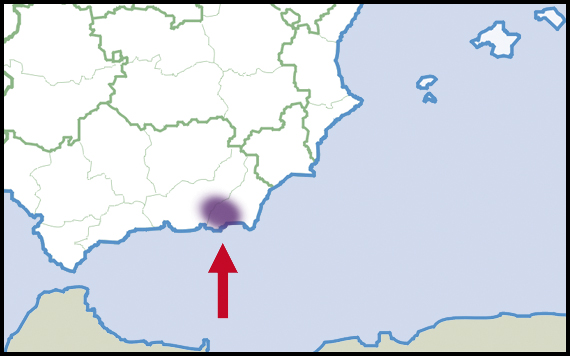
Distribution

This species is endemic to the Sierra de Gádor mountains in the province of Almería, Spain.
