= Xerocrassa poecilodoma =

Conservation status
- Least Concern (IUCN 3.1)

Scientific classification
- Kingdom: Animalia
- Phylum: Mollusca
- Class: Gastropoda
- Order: Stylommatophora
- Family: Geomitridae
- Genus: Xerocrassa
- Species: X. poecilodoma

Binomial name
- Xerocrassa poecilodoma (Boettger, 1894)

Synonyms
- Helix (Xerophila) poecilodoma Boettger, 1894; Xerocrassa (Xerocrassa) poecilodoma (O. Boettger, 1894) · alternate representation

Species of gastropod

Xerocrassa poecilodoma is a species of air-breathing land snail, a pulmonate gastropod mollusk in the family Geomitridae.

== Distribution ==
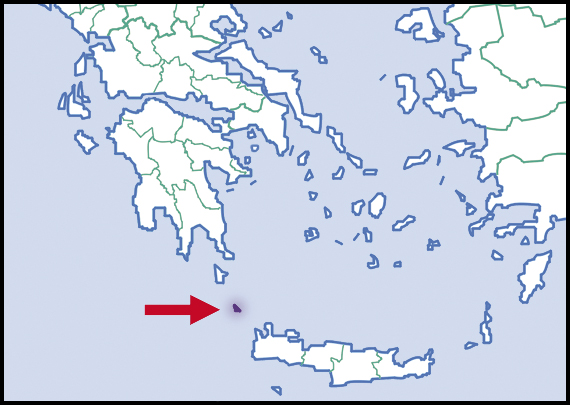
Distribution

This species is endemic to the island of Antikythira in Greece.

== See also ==
- List of non-marine molluscs of Greece
