= Xerocrassa siphnica =

Conservation status
- Least Concern (IUCN 3.1)

Scientific classification
- Kingdom: Animalia
- Phylum: Mollusca
- Class: Gastropoda
- Order: Stylommatophora
- Family: Geomitridae
- Genus: Xerocrassa
- Species: X. siphnica

Binomial name
- Xerocrassa siphnica (Kobelt, 1883)

Synonyms
- Helix (Jacosta) siphnica Kobelt, 1883

Species of gastropod

Xerocrassa siphnica is a species of air-breathing land snail, a pulmonate gastropod mollusk in the family Geomitridae.

== Distribution ==
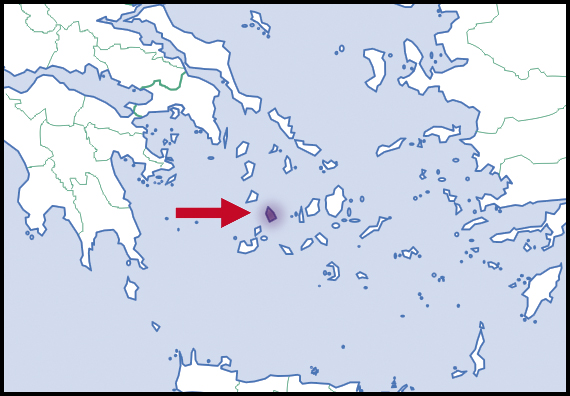
Distribution

This species is endemic to the island of Siphnos in Greece.

== See also ==
- List of non-marine molluscs of Greece
