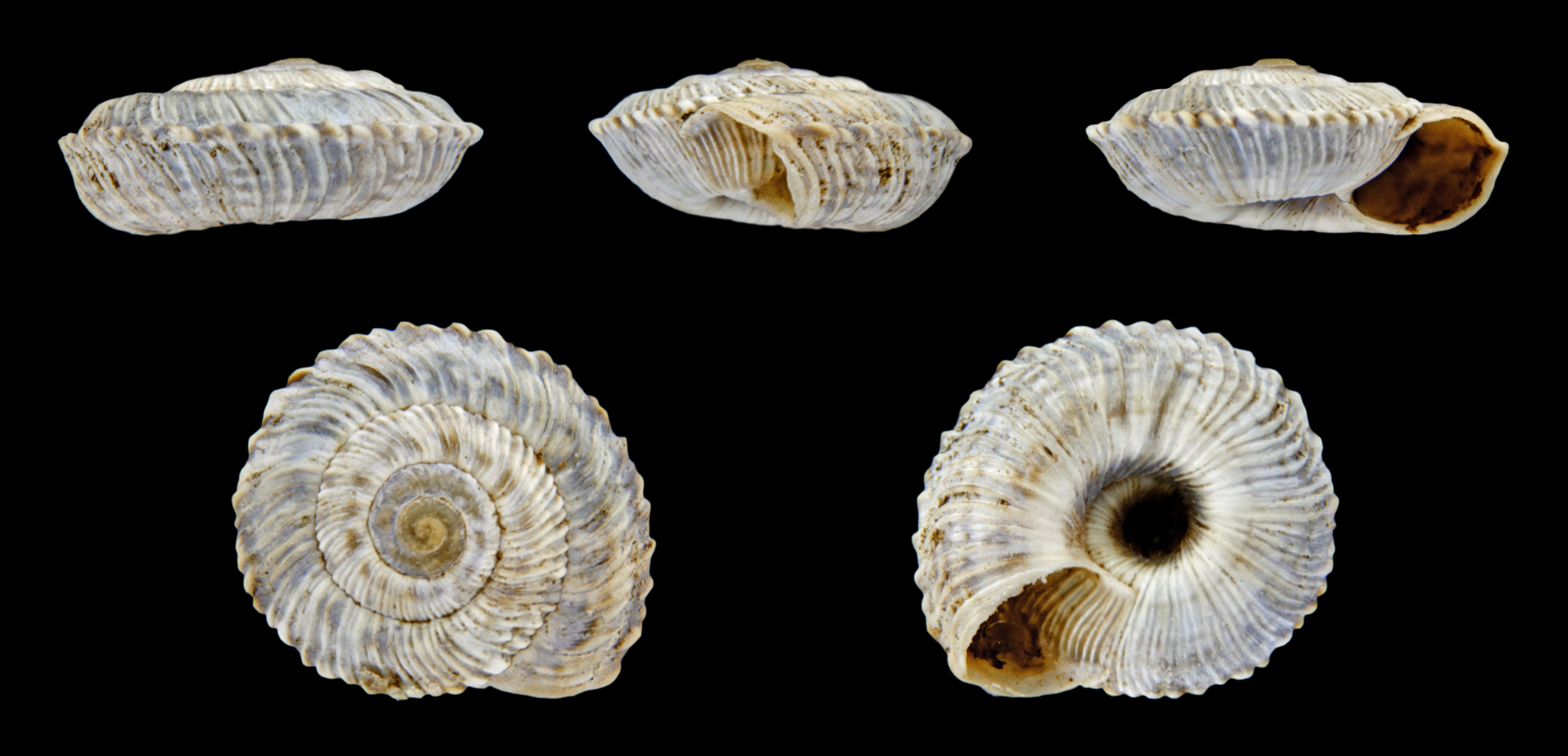

Conservation status
- Endangered (IUCN 3.1)

Scientific classification
- Kingdom: Animalia
- Phylum: Mollusca
- Class: Gastropoda
- Order: Stylommatophora
- Family: Geomitridae
- Genus: Xerocrassa
- Species: X. homeyeri
- Subspecies: X. h. homeyeri

Trinomial name
- Xerocrassa homeyeri homeyeri (Dohrn & Heynemann, 1862)

Synonyms
- Helix (Jacosta) moraguesi Kobelt, 1883 (original combination); Helix prietoi Hidalgo, 1878 (original combination); Xerocrassa (Amandana) moraguesi (Kobelt, 1883)· alternate representation; Xerocrassa (Amandana) prietoi (Hidalgo, 1878) · alternate representation; Xerocrassa (Amandana) prietoi muroensis Graack, 2005 · alternate representation; Xerocrassa (Amandana) prietoi prietoi (Hidalgo, 1878) · alternate representation; Xerocrassa moraguesi (Kobelt, 1883) superseded combination; Xerocrassa prietoi (Hidalgo, 1878) superseded combination; Xerocrassa prietoi muroensis Graack, 2005 junior subjective synonym; Xerocrassa prietoi prietoi (Hidalgo, 1878) > superseded combination

= Xerocrassa homeyeri homeyeri =

Species of gastropod

Xerocrassa homeyeri homeyeri is a species of air-breathing land snail, a pulmonate gastropod mollusk in the family Geomitridae, the hairy snails and their allies.

== Distribution ==
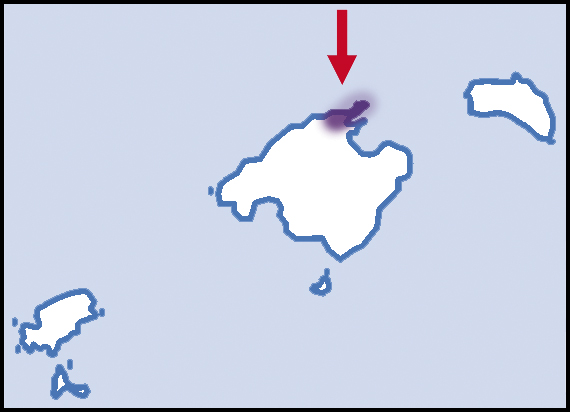
Distribution

This species is endemic to Spain, where it is restricted to the northern part of the Balearic island of Mallorca.
