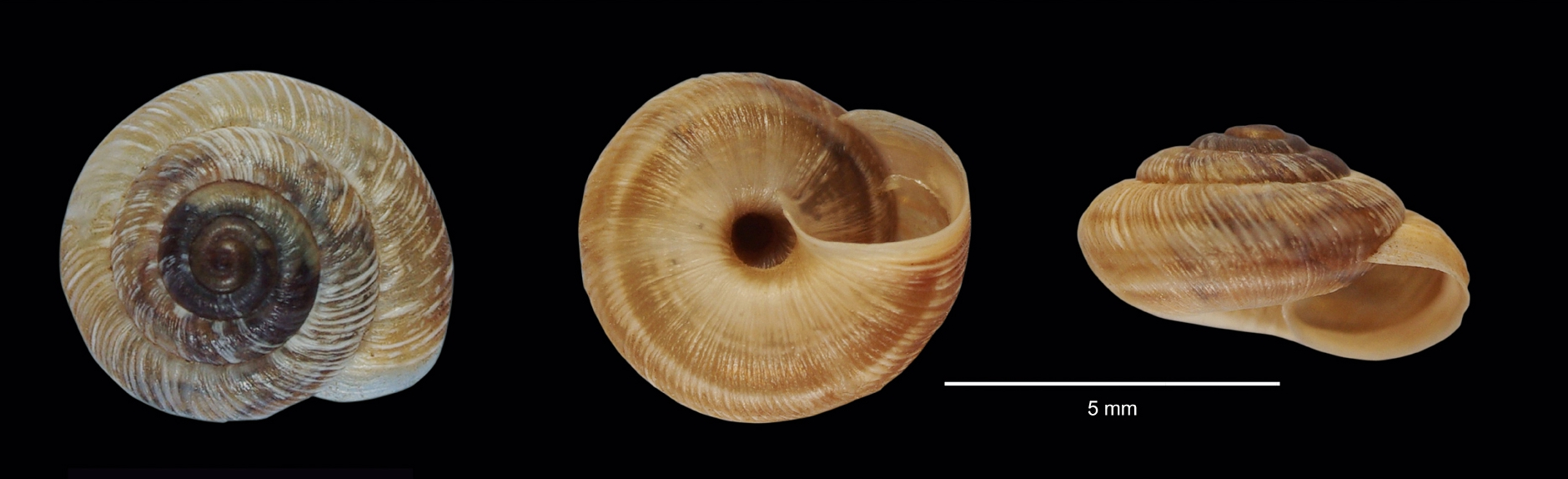

Conservation status
- Least Concern (IUCN 3.1)

Scientific classification
- Kingdom: Animalia
- Phylum: Mollusca
- Class: Gastropoda
- Order: Stylommatophora
- Family: Geomitridae
- Genus: Xerocrassa
- Species: X. penchinati

Binomial name
- Xerocrassa penchinati (Bourguignat, 1868)

Synonyms
- Helix miraculensis Marcet, 1906; Helix monistrolensis Fagot, 1884; Helix penchinati Bourguignat, 1868; Helix saldubensis Servain, 1880; Helix subpaladhili Fagot, 1906; Helix zaragozensis Servain, 1880; Trochoidea penchinati (Bourguignat, 1868) (superseded combination); Xerocrassa (Amandana) penchinati (Bourguignat, 1868) · alternate representation; Xeroplexa blancae Larraz & Jordana, 1984

= Xerocrassa penchinati =

Species of gastropod

Xerocrassa penchinati is a species of air-breathing land snail, a pulmonate gastropod mollusk in the family Geomitridae.

== Distribution ==
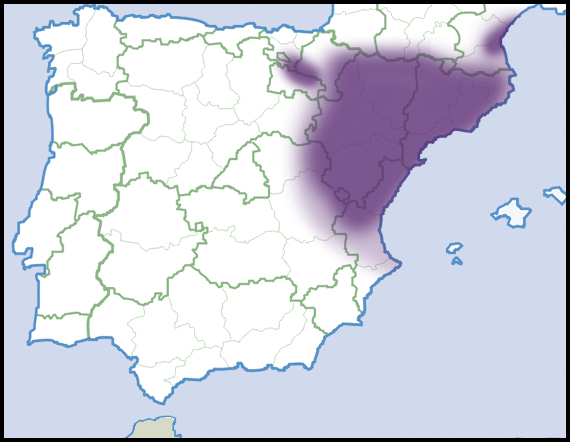
Distribution

This species is native to Spain, Andorra and France.
