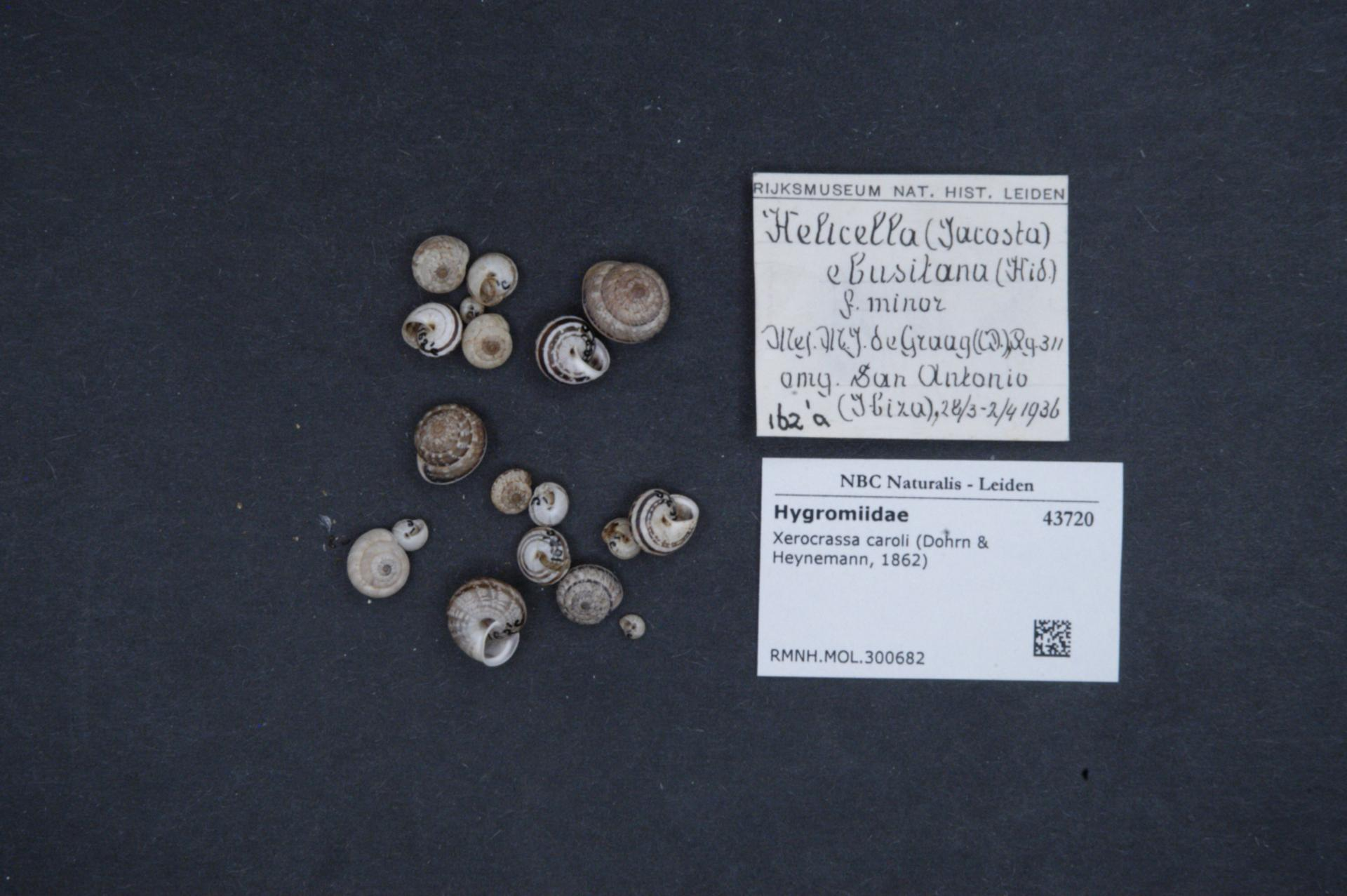
- Shell of Xerocrassa caroli (specimen at Naturalis Biodiversity Center)

Conservation status
- Least Concern (IUCN 3.1)

Scientific classification
- Kingdom: Animalia
- Phylum: Mollusca
- Class: Gastropoda
- Order: Stylommatophora
- Family: Geomitridae
- Genus: Xerocrassa
- Species: X. caroli

Binomial name
- Xerocrassa caroli (Dohrn & Heynemann, 1862)

Synonyms
- Helix caroli Dohrn & Heynemann, 1862 · unaccepted (original combination); Xerocrassa (Amandana) caroli (Dohrn & Heynemann, 1862) · alternate representation

= Xerocrassa caroli =

Species of gastropod

Xerocrassa caroli is a species of air-breathing land snail in the family Geomitridae.

The species includes at least 8 subspecies:

- Xerocrassa caroli alegriae Schröder, 1984
- Xerocrassa caroli caroli (Dohrn & Heynemann, 1862)
- Xerocrassa caroli conjungens (Jaeckel, 1952)
- Xerocrassa caroli espartariensis Schröder, 1984
- Xerocrassa caroli jaeckeli (Altimira, 1965)
- Xerocrassa caroli scopulicola (Bofill i Poch & Aguilar-Amat, 1924)
- Xerocrassa caroli vedrae (Jaeckel, 1952)
- Xerocrassa caroli vedranellensis (Jaeckel, 1952)

== Distribution ==
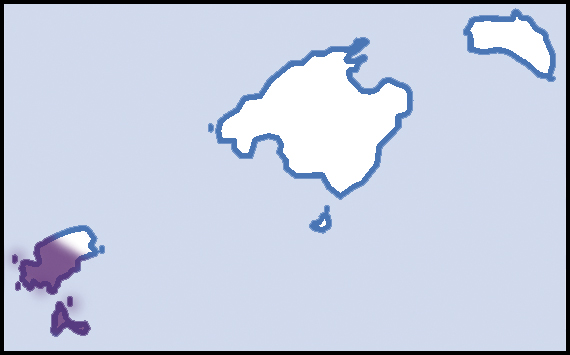
Distribution

This species is endemic to Spain, where it occurs in the Pityusic islands of Ibiza and Formentera.
