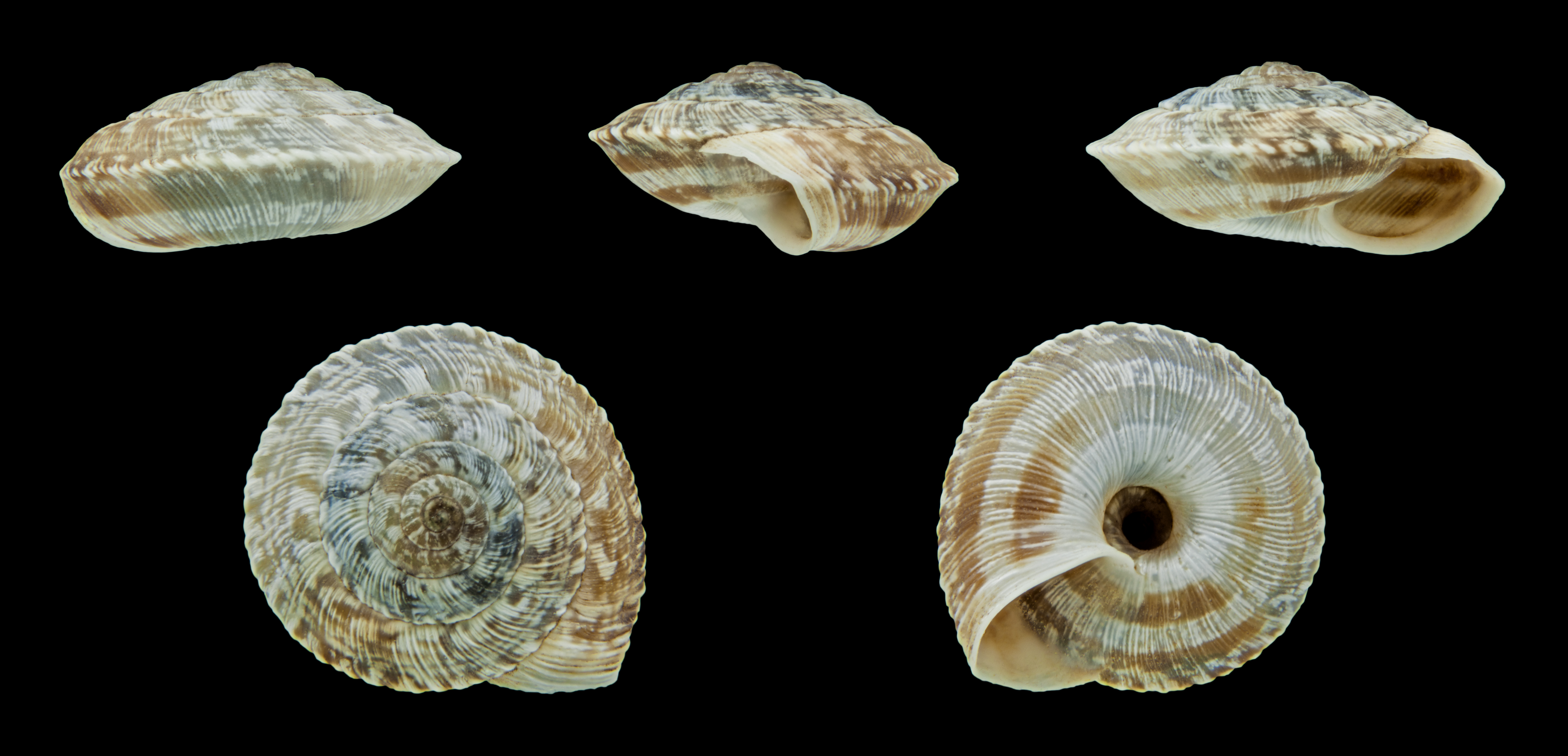

Conservation status
- Least Concern (IUCN 3.1)

Scientific classification
- Kingdom: Animalia
- Phylum: Mollusca
- Class: Gastropoda
- Order: Stylommatophora
- Family: Geomitridae
- Genus: Xerocrassa
- Species: X. homeyeri

Binomial name
- Xerocrassa homeyeri (Dohrn & Heynemann, 1862)

Synonyms
- Helix homeyeri Dohrn & Heynemann, 1862; Xerocrassa (Amandana) homeyeri (Dohrn & Heynemann, 1862) · alternate representation

= Xerocrassa homeyeri =

Species of gastropod

Xerocrassa homeyeri is a species of air-breathing land snail, a pulmonate gastropod mollusk in the family Geomitridae.

Subspecies

- Xerocrassa homeyeri ferrutxensis Forés & Altaba, 2014
- Xerocrassa homeyeri homeyeri (Dohrn & Heynemann, 1862)
- Xerocrassa homeyeri ponsi (Hidalgo, 1878)

== Distribution ==
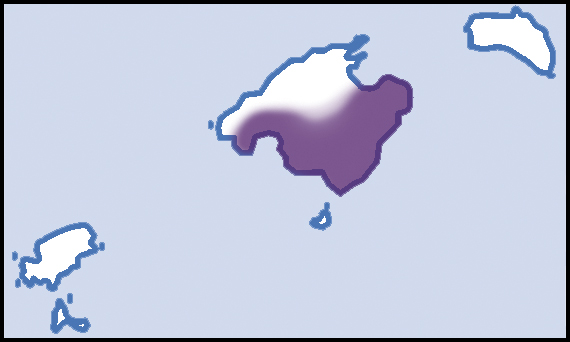
Distribution

This species is endemic to the Balearic island of Mallorca in Spain.
