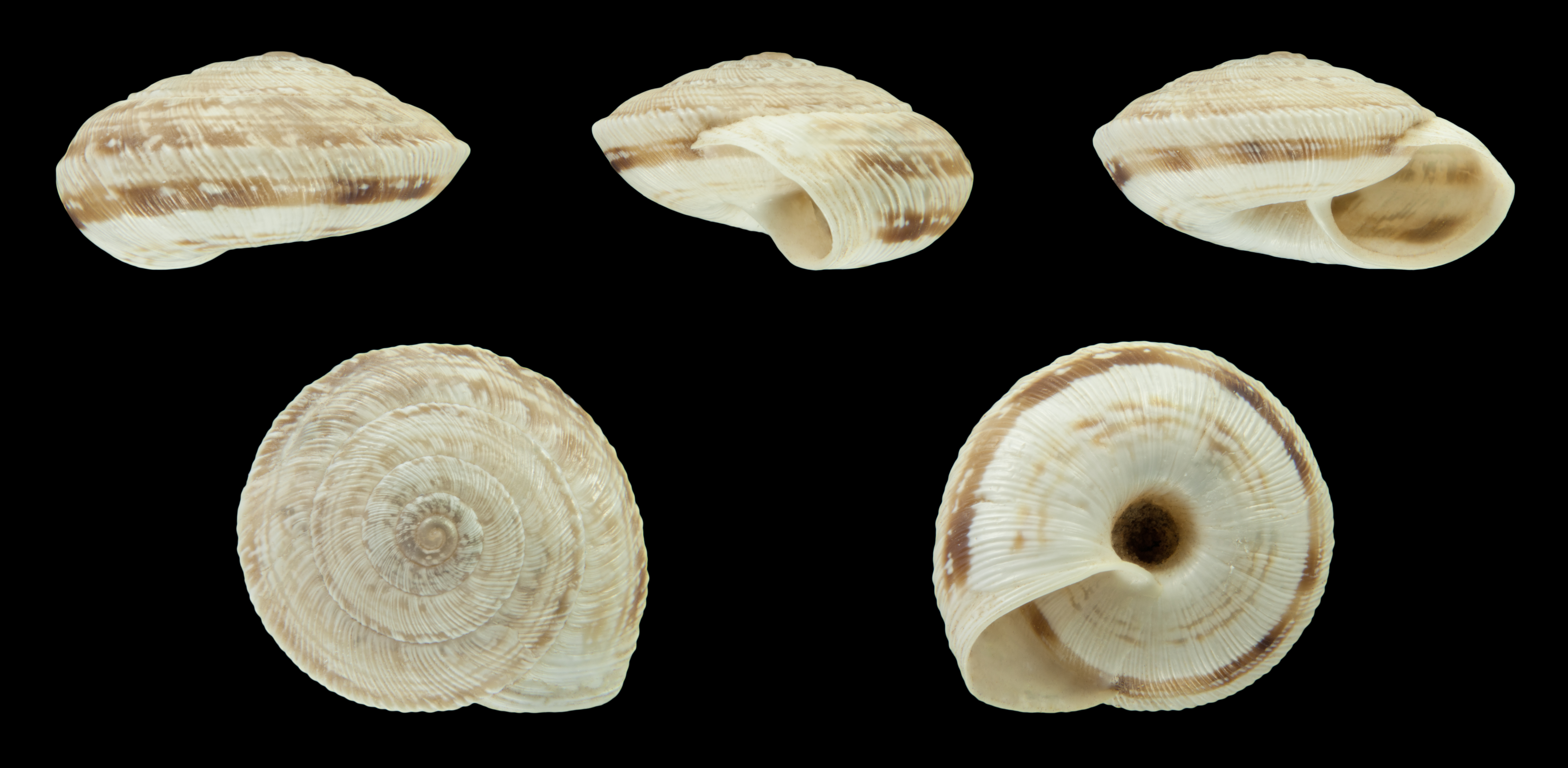
- Xerocrassa frater pollenzensis (Hidalgo, 1878)

Conservation status
- Least Concern (IUCN 3.1)

Scientific classification
- Kingdom: Animalia
- Phylum: Mollusca
- Class: Gastropoda
- Order: Stylommatophora
- Family: Geomitridae
- Genus: Xerocrassa
- Species: X. frater

Binomial name
- Xerocrassa frater (Dohrn & Heynemann, 1862)

Synonyms
- Helicella frater (Dohrn & Heynemann, 1862) · unaccepted (chresonym); Helix frater Dohrn & Heynemann, 1862 · unaccepted (original combination); Helix pollenzensis Hidalgo, 1878 · unaccepted (junior synonym); Xerocrassa (Amandana) frater (Dohrn & Heynemann, 1862) · alternate representation

= Xerocrassa frater =

Species of gastropod

Xerocrassa frater is a species of air-breathing land snail, a pulmonate gastropod mollusk in the family Geomitridae.

Subspecies

- Xerocrassa frater frater (Dohrn & Heynemann, 1862)
- Xerocrassa frater newka (Dohrn & Heynemann, 1862)
- Xerocrassa frater pollenzensis (Hidalgo, 1878)
- Xerocrassa frater pulaensis Beckmann, 2007

== Distribution ==
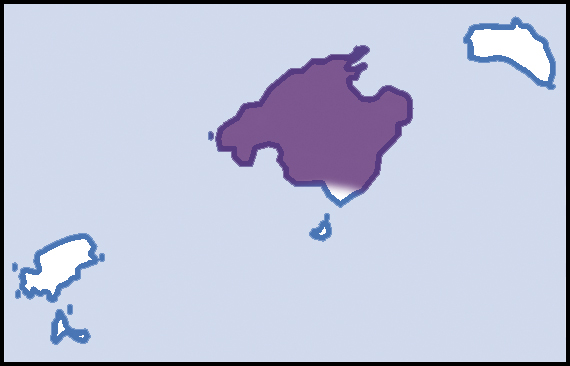
Distribution

This species is endemic to the Balearic island of Mallorca in Spain.
