= Xerocrassa zaharensis =

Conservation status
- Vulnerable (IUCN 3.1)

Scientific classification
- Kingdom: Animalia
- Phylum: Mollusca
- Class: Gastropoda
- Order: Stylommatophora
- Family: Geomitridae
- Genus: Xerocrassa
- Species: X. zaharensis

Binomial name
- Xerocrassa zaharensis (Puente & Arrébola, 1996)

Synonyms
- Trochoidea zaharensis Puente & Arrébola, 1996; Trochoidea (Xerocrassa) zaharensis Puente & Arrébola, 1996 (original combination); Xerocrassa (Amandana) zaharensis (Puente & Arrébola, 1996) · alternate representation

Species of gastropod

Xerocrassa zaharensis is a species of air-breathing land snail, a pulmonate gastropod mollusk in the family Geomitridae.

== Distribution ==
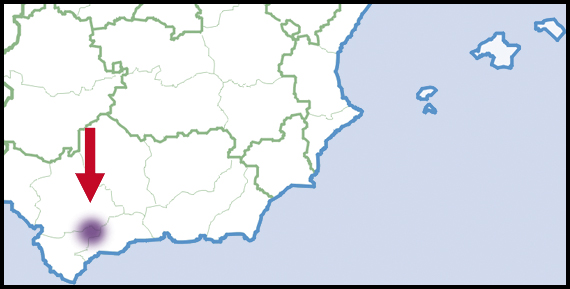
Distribution

This species is endemic to Spain, where it is only known from its type locality in Zahara de la Sierra, Cádiz.
