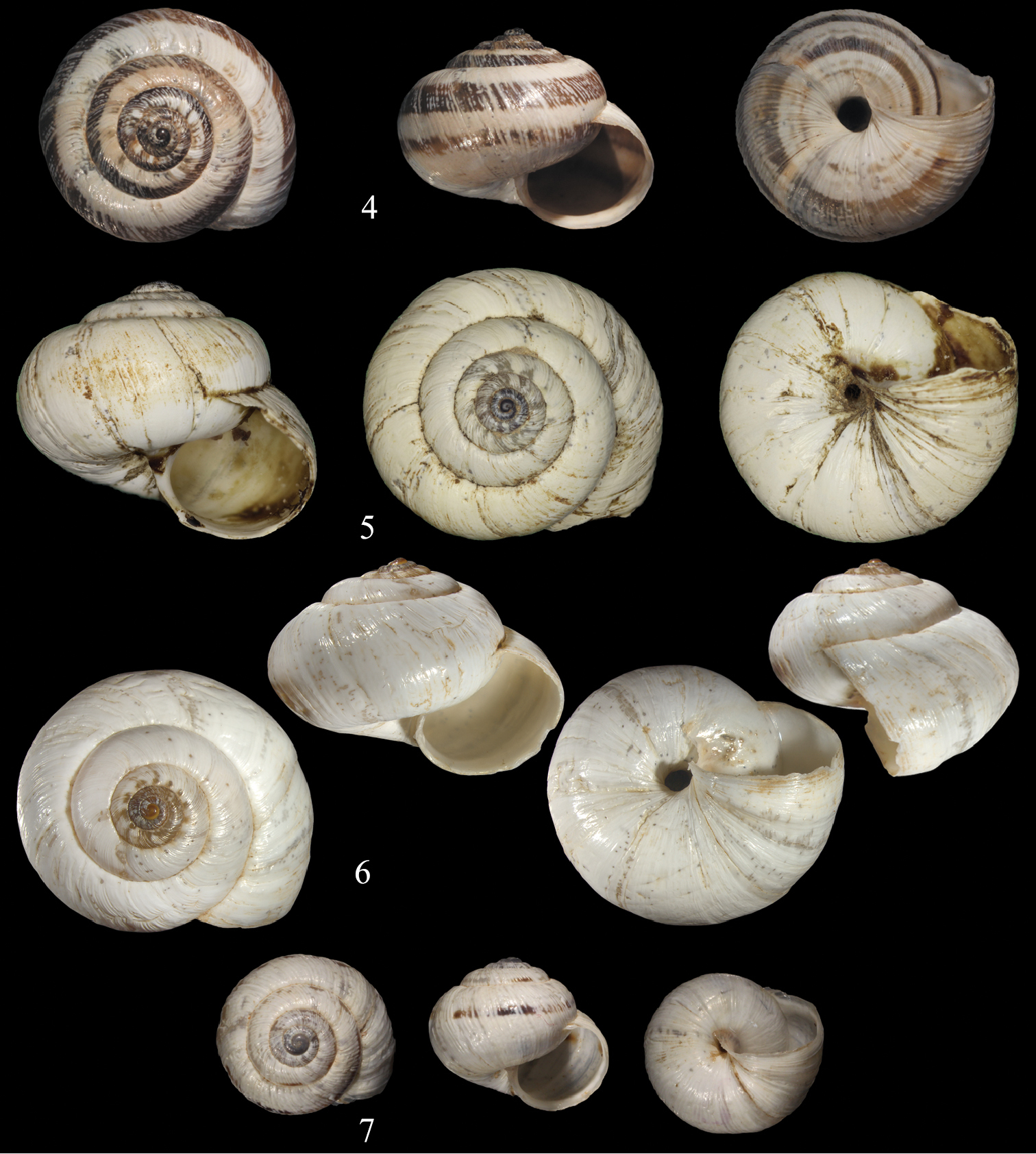
- Figures 4–7; Xerocrassa species. 4 Xerocrassa latastei, lectotype MHNG-MOLL 115121, Ketenna [= Kettana], D = 15.9 mm 5 Xerocrassa latasteopsis, lectotype MHNG-MOLL 115131, Foum Hallouf, D = 18.34 mm 6 Xerocrassa latasteopsis, NMBE 549906, Sidi Aich 2, D = 18.2 mm 7 Xerocrassa lacertara, syntype MHNG-MOLL 114001, “Plaines entre Djelfa et El-Aghouat”, D = 11.8 mm.

Scientific classification
- Kingdom: Animalia
- Phylum: Mollusca
- Class: Gastropoda
- Order: Stylommatophora
- Family: Geomitridae
- Genus: Xerocrassa; Monterosato, 1892

Type species
- Helix seetzeni L. Pfeiffer, 1847

Synonyms
- Ereminella Pallary, 1919; Heldia P. Hesse, 1926; Helix (Amandana) Fagot, 1891 · unaccepted; Trochoidea (Xerobarcana) R. Brandt, 1959; Trochoidea (Xeroclausa) Monterosato, 1892; Trochoidea (Xerocrassa) Monterosato, 1892 (chresonym); Trochoidea (Xeroregima) R. Brandt, 1959; Xerobarcana Brandt, 1959; Xerocauta Monterosato, 1892; Xeroclausa Monterosato, 1892; Xerocrassa (Amandana) Fagot, 1891 · alternate representation; Xerocrassa (Xeroclausa) Monterosato, 1892 · alternate representation; Xerocrassa (Xerocrassa) Monterosato, 1892 · alternate representation; Xerophila (Ereminella) Pallary, 1919 (superseded generic combination); Xeroptyca Monterosato, 1892; Xeroregima Brandt, 1959

= Xerocrassa =

Genus of gastropods

Xerocrassa is a genus of small, air-breathing land snails, terrestrial pulmonate gastropod molluscs in the subfamily Helicellinae of the family Geomitridae.

Some species of Xerocrassa are instead considered to belong to the subgenus Xerocrassa, within the genus Trochoidea; in those cases the species are listed under the generic name Trochoidea. However, for other authors both taxa are not closely related being different genera.

== Taxonomy ==
The genus Xerocrassa is divided in 3 subgenera:

- Xerocrassa (Amandana) Fagot, 1891
- Xerocrassa (Xeroclausa) Monterosato, 1892
- Xerocrassa (Xerocrassa) Monterosato, 1892

== Species ==
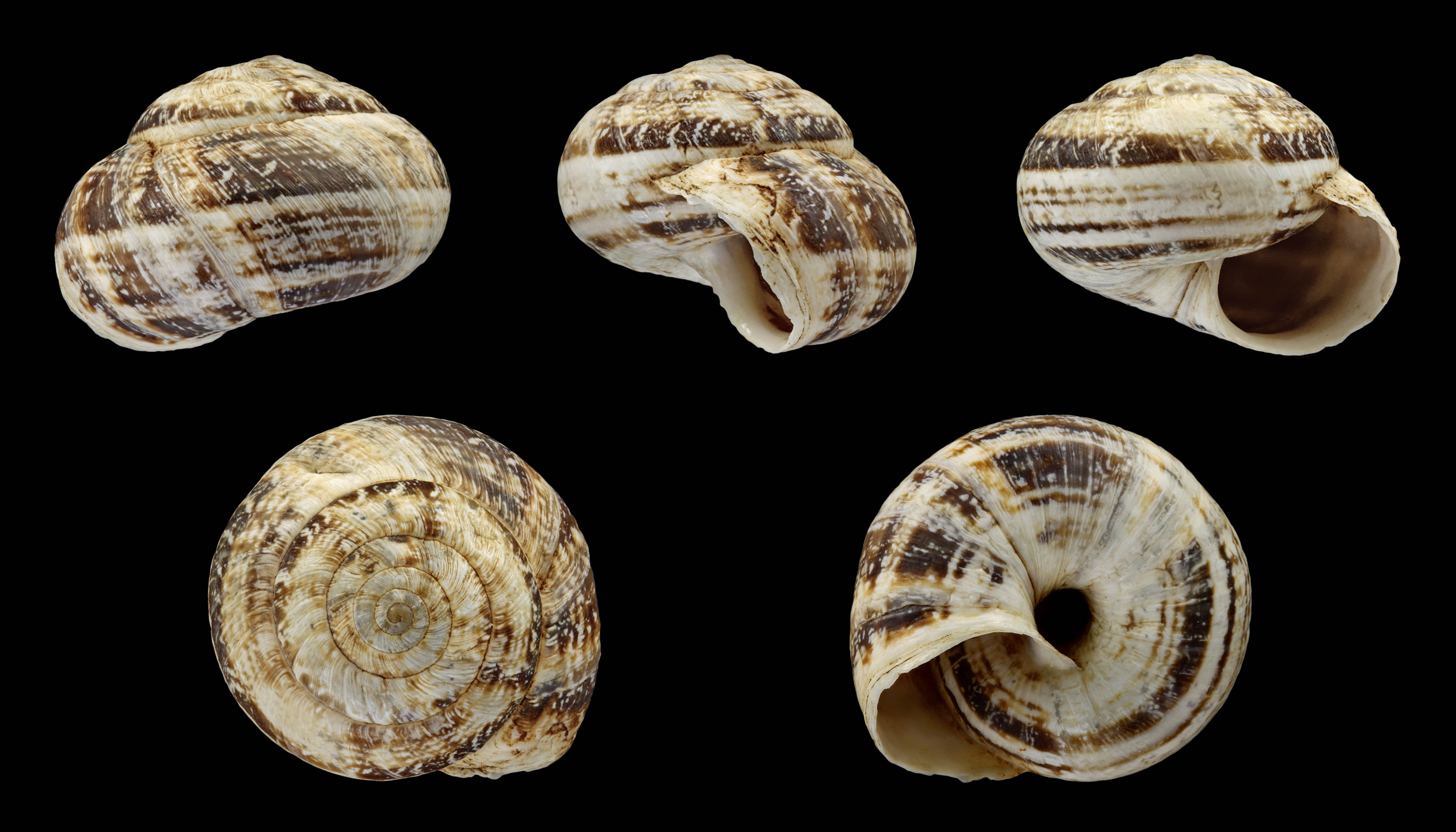
Xerocrassa cretica shell

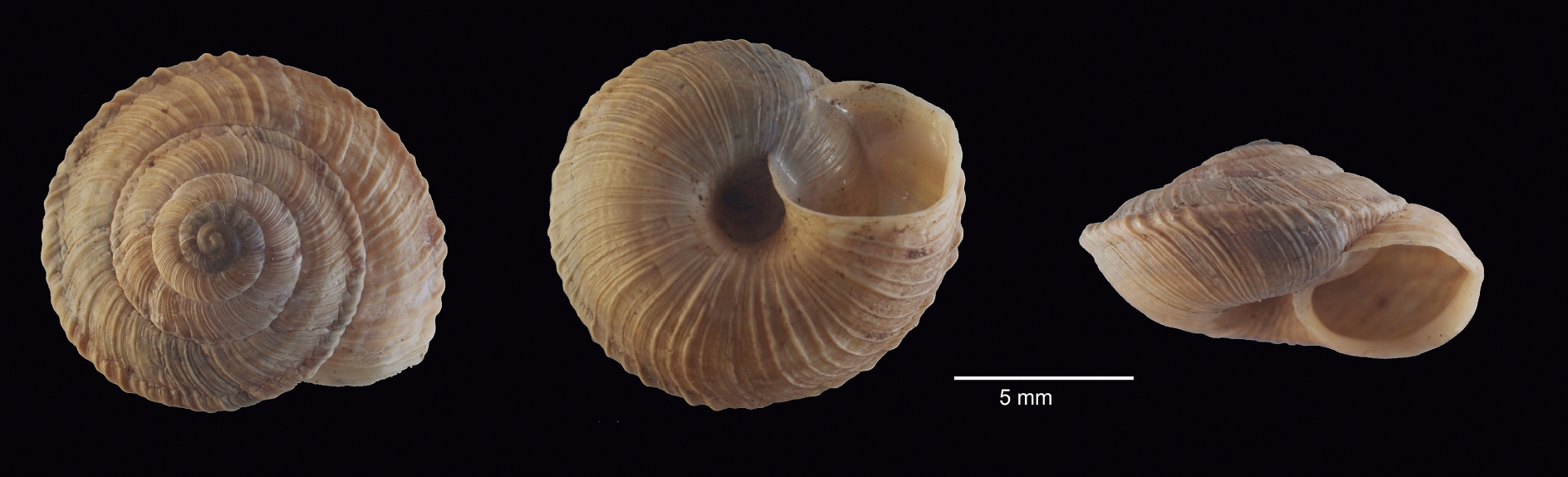
Xerocrassa montserratensis shell

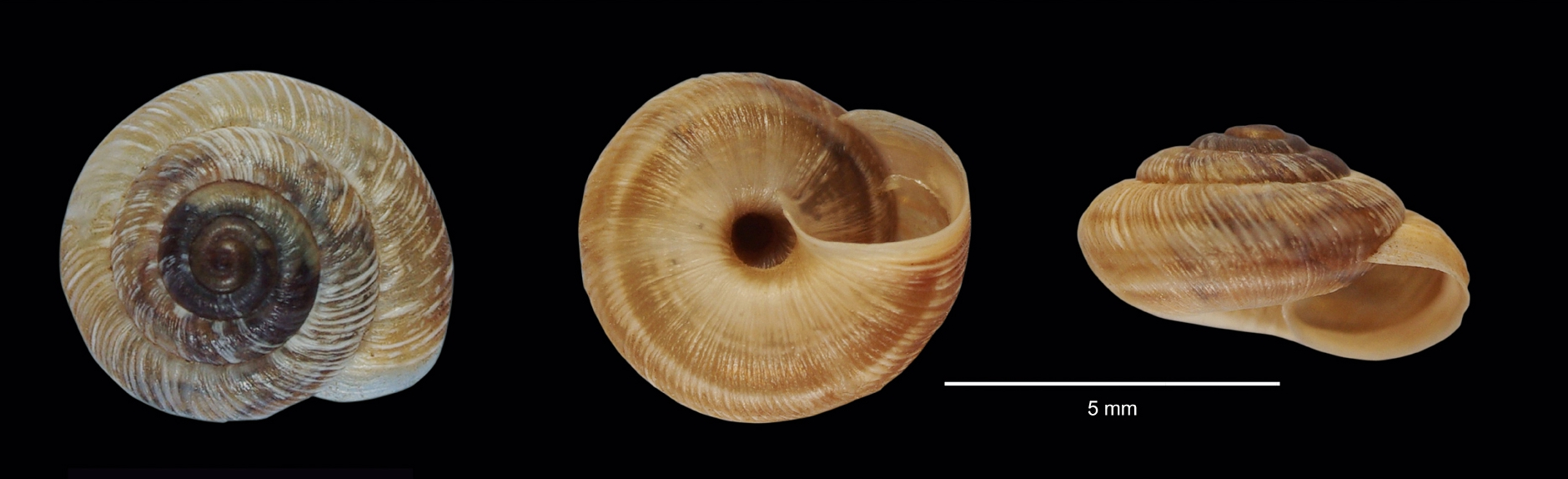
Xerocrassa penchinati shell

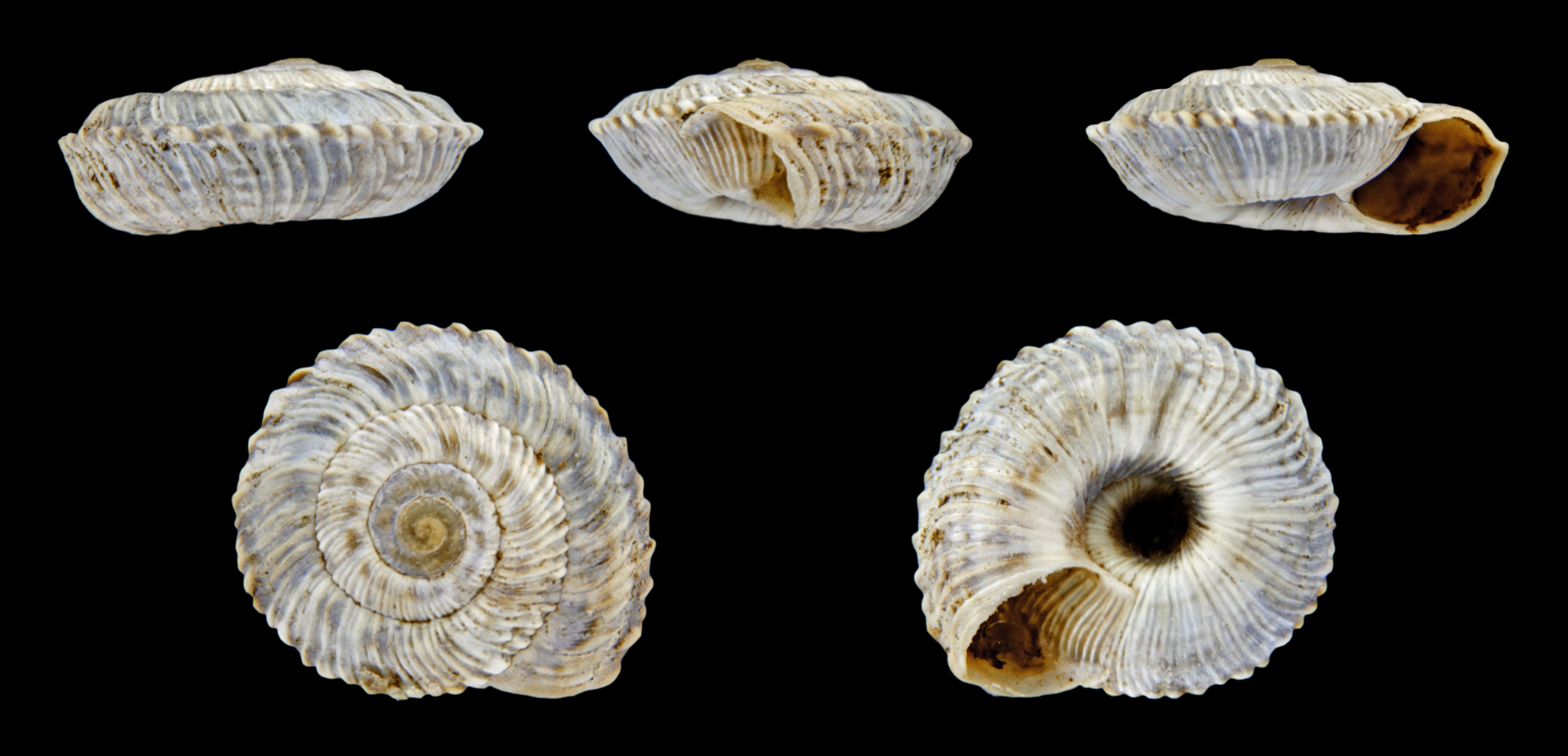
Xerocrassa prietoi shell

Species in the genus Xerocrassa:

- Xerocrassa amphiconus (Maltzan, 1883)
- Xerocrassa barceloi (Hidalgo, 1878)
- Xerocrassa berenice (Kobelt, 1883)
- Xerocrassa carinatoglobosa (F. Haas, 1934)
- Xerocrassa caroli (Dohrn & Heynemann, 1862)
- Xerocrassa chiae (Fagot, 1886)
- Xerocrassa cisternasi (Hidalgo, 1883)
- Xerocrassa claudia (Hausdorf & Welter-Schultes, 1998)
- Xerocrassa claudiconus (Hausdorf & Welter-Schultes, 1998)
- Xerocrassa claudinae (Gasull, 1964)
- Xerocrassa cobosi (Ortiz de Zárate López, 1962)
- Xerocrassa commeata (Mousson, 1874)
- Xerocrassa cretica (Férussac, 1821)
- Xerocrassa davidiana (Bourguignat, 1863)
- Xerocrassa derogata (Rossmässler, 1854)
- Xerocrassa diensis (Maltzan, 1883)
- Xerocrassa ebusitana (Hidalgo, 1869)
- Xerocrassa edmundi (Martínez-Ortí, 2006)
- Xerocrassa elevata (Pallary, 1924)
- Xerocrassa eremophila (L. Pfeiffer, 1853)
- Xerocrassa erkelii (Kobelt, 1878)
- Xerocrassa formenterensis (F. Schröder, 1984)
- Xerocrassa fourtaui (Pallary, 1902)
- Xerocrassa franciscoi (Hausdorf & Sauer, 2009)
- Xerocrassa frater (Dohrn & Heynemann, 1862)
- Xerocrassa geyeri (Soós, 1926)
- Xerocrassa gharlapsi (Beckmann, 1987)
- Xerocrassa grabusana (Hausdorf & Sauer, 2009)
- Xerocrassa grata (Haas, 1924)
- Xerocrassa helleri (Forcart, 1976)
- Xerocrassa heraklea (Hausdorf & Sauer, 2009)
- Xerocrassa homeyeri (Dohrn & Heynemann, 1862)
- Xerocrassa huggani R. Brandt, 1959
- Xerocrassa jimenensis (Puente & Arrébola, 1996)
- Xerocrassa kydonia (Hausdorf & Sauer, 2009)
- Xerocrassa lacertara (Bourguignat, 1863)
- Xerocrassa lacipensis Torres Alba & Quintana Cardona, 2021
- Xerocrassa langloisiana (Bourguignat, 1853)
- Xerocrassa lasithiensis (Hausdorf & Sauer, 2009)
- Xerocrassa latastei (Letourneux in Letourneux & Bourguignat, 1887)
- Xerocrassa latasteopsis (Letourneux & Bourguignat, 1887)
- Xerocrassa libyca (Kobelt, 1883)
- Xerocrassa meda (Porro, 1840)
- Xerocrassa mesostena (Westerlund, 1879)
- Xerocrassa mienisi (Forcart, 1976)
- Xerocrassa molinae (Hidalgo, 1883)
- Xerocrassa montserratensis (Hidalgo, 1870)
- Xerocrassa naisi (Pallary, 1939)
- Xerocrassa newka (Dohrn & Heynemann, 1862)
- Xerocrassa nicosiana (Gittenberger, 1991)
- Xerocrassa nyeli (Mittre, 1842)
- Xerocrassa penalveri Martinez-Orti, 2022
- Xerocrassa penchinati (Bourguignat, 1868)
- Xerocrassa picardi (F. Haas, 1933)
- Xerocrassa pilsbryi Forcart, 1976
- Xerocrassa poecilodoma (Boettger, 1894)
- Xerocrassa pollenzensis (Hidalgo, 1878)
- Xerocrassa pseudojacosta (Forcart, 1976)
- Xerocrassa rhabdota (Sturany, 1901)
- Xerocrassa rhithymna (Hausdorf & Sauer, 2009)
- Xerocrassa ripacurcica (Bofill, 1886)
- Xerocrassa roblesi (Martínez-Ortí, 2000)
- Xerocrassa scharonica (F. Haas, 1936)
- Xerocrassa seetzeni (Pfeiffer, 1847) – the type species
- Xerocrassa serrulata (H.H. Beck, 1837)
- Xerocrassa siderensis (Maltzan, 1883)
- Xerocrassa simulata (Ehrenberg, 1831)
- Xerocrassa sinaica (E. von Martens, 1889)
- Xerocrassa siphnica (Kobelt, 1883)
- Xerocrassa subrogata (Pfeiffer, 1853)
- Xerocrassa subvariegata (Maltzan, 1883)
- Xerocrassa tuberculosa (Conrad, 1852)
- Xerocrassa turolensis (Ortiz de Zárate, 1963)
- Xerocrassa zaharensis (Puente & Arrébola, 1996)
- Xerocrassa zilchi (Forcart, 1976)
- Xerocrassa zviae Mienis, 2017

Taxon inquirendum

- Xerocrassa philamnia (Bourguignat, 1863)

== Synonyms ==
- Xerocrassa arturi (Haas, 1924): synonym of Xerocrassa ripacurcica ripacurcica (Bofill, 1886) (junior subjective synonym)
- Xerocrassa betulonensis (Bofill, 1898 ): synonym of Xerocrassa montserratensis (Hidalgo, 1870)
- Xerocrassa cardonae (Hidalgo, 1867): synonym of Xerocrassa nyeli (Mittre, 1842) (superseded combination)
- Xerocrassa ferreri (Jaeckel, 1952): synonym of Xerocrassa newka (Dohrn & Heynemann, 1862) (junior subjective synonym)
- Xerocrassa madritensis (Rambur, 1868): synonym of Xerotricha madritensis (Rambur, 1868) (unaccepted > superseded combination)
- Xerocrassa moraguesi (Kobelt, 1883): synonym of Xerocrassa homeyeri homeyeri (Dohrn & Heynemann, 1862) (superseded combination)
- Xerocrassa muehlfeldtiana (Rossmässler, 1837): synonym of Helicopsis striata (O. F. Müller, 1774)
- Xerocrassa pallaresica (Fagot, 1886): synonym of Xerocrassa madritensis (Rambur, 1868): synonym of Xerotricha madritensis (Rambur, 1868) (junior subjective synonym)
- Xerocrassa ponsi (Hidalgo, 1878): synonym of Xerocrassa nyeli ponsi (Hidalgo, 1878)
- Xerocrassa prietoi (Hidalgo, 1878): synonym of Xerocrassa homeyeri homeyeri (Dohrn & Heynemann, 1862)
- Xerocrassa salvanae (Fagot, 1886): synonym of Xerotricha madritensis (Rambur, 1868) (junior subjective synonym)

== See also ==
- Trochoidea
