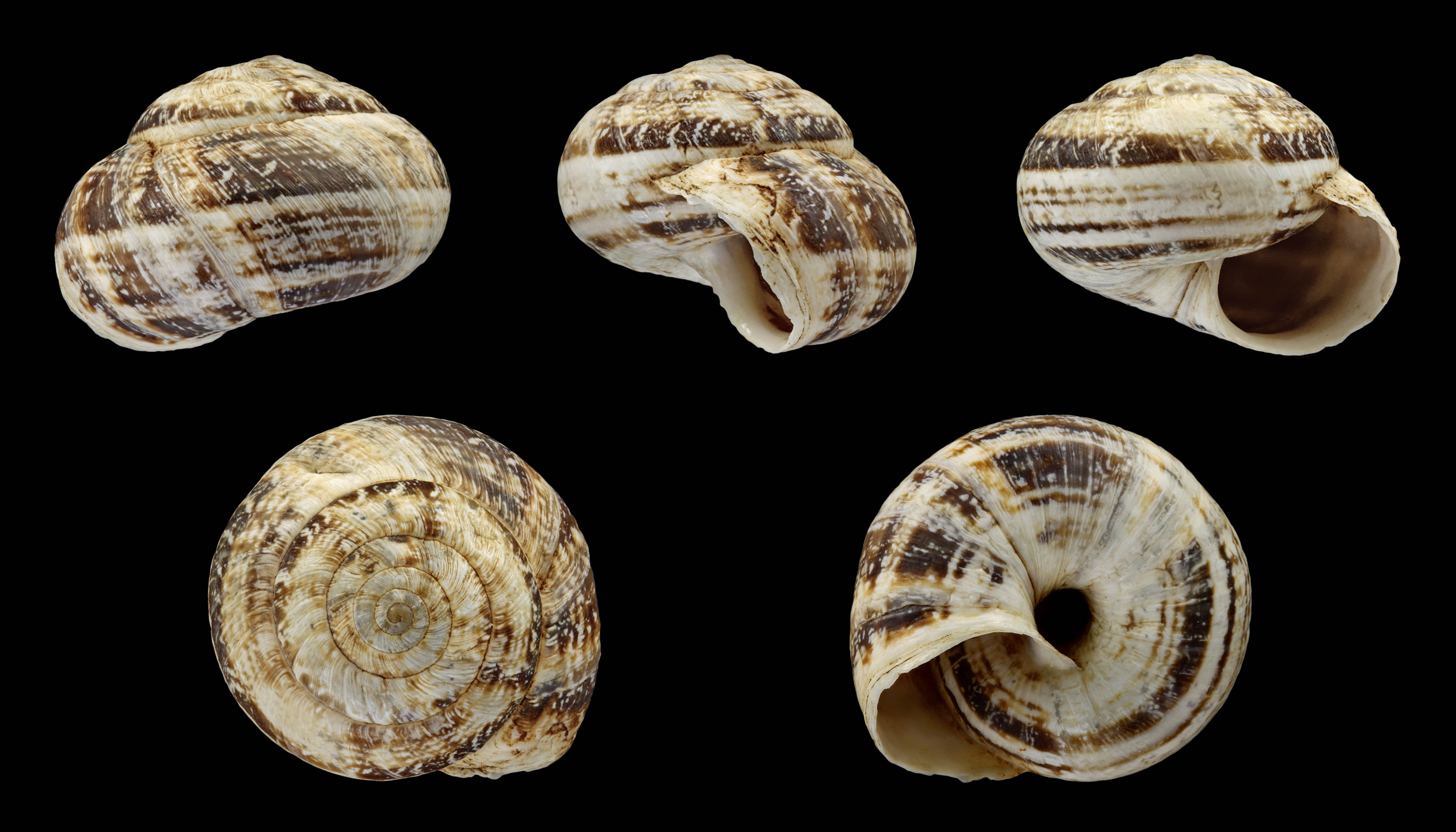

Conservation status
- Least Concern (IUCN 3.1)

Scientific classification
- Kingdom: Animalia
- Phylum: Mollusca
- Class: Gastropoda
- Order: Stylommatophora
- Family: Geomitridae
- Genus: Xerocrassa
- Species: X. cretica

Binomial name
- Xerocrassa cretica (Pfeiffer, 1841)

Synonyms
- Helix (Helicella) cretica L. Pfeiffer, 1841 (original name); Helix (Xerophila) cauta Westerlund, 1879 (junior synonym); Helix chalcidica var. didyma Westerlund, 1879 (junior synonym); Helix cretica L. Pfeiffer, 1841 (original combination); Trochoidea (Xerocrassa) cretica (L. Pfeiffer, 1841); Trochoidea (Xerocrassa) cretica cretica (L. Pfeiffer, 1841); Xerocrassa (Xerocrassa) cretica (L. Pfeiffer, 1841) · alternate representation

= Xerocrassa cretica =

Species of gastropod

Xerocrassa cretica is a species of air-breathing land snail, a pulmonate gastropod mollusc in the family Geomitridae.

== Distribution ==
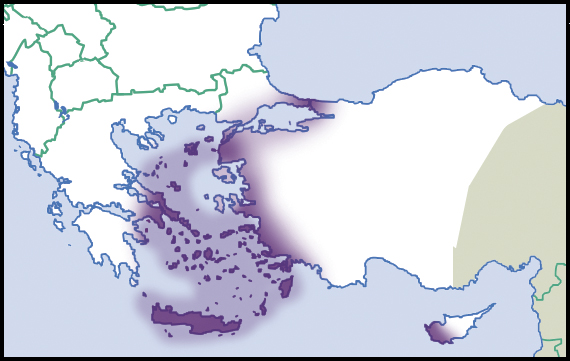
DFistribution

This species is native to Cyprus, Greece, Libya and Turkey.
