= Hermann von Maltzan =

German malacologist

Hermann Friedrich Freiherr von Maltzan
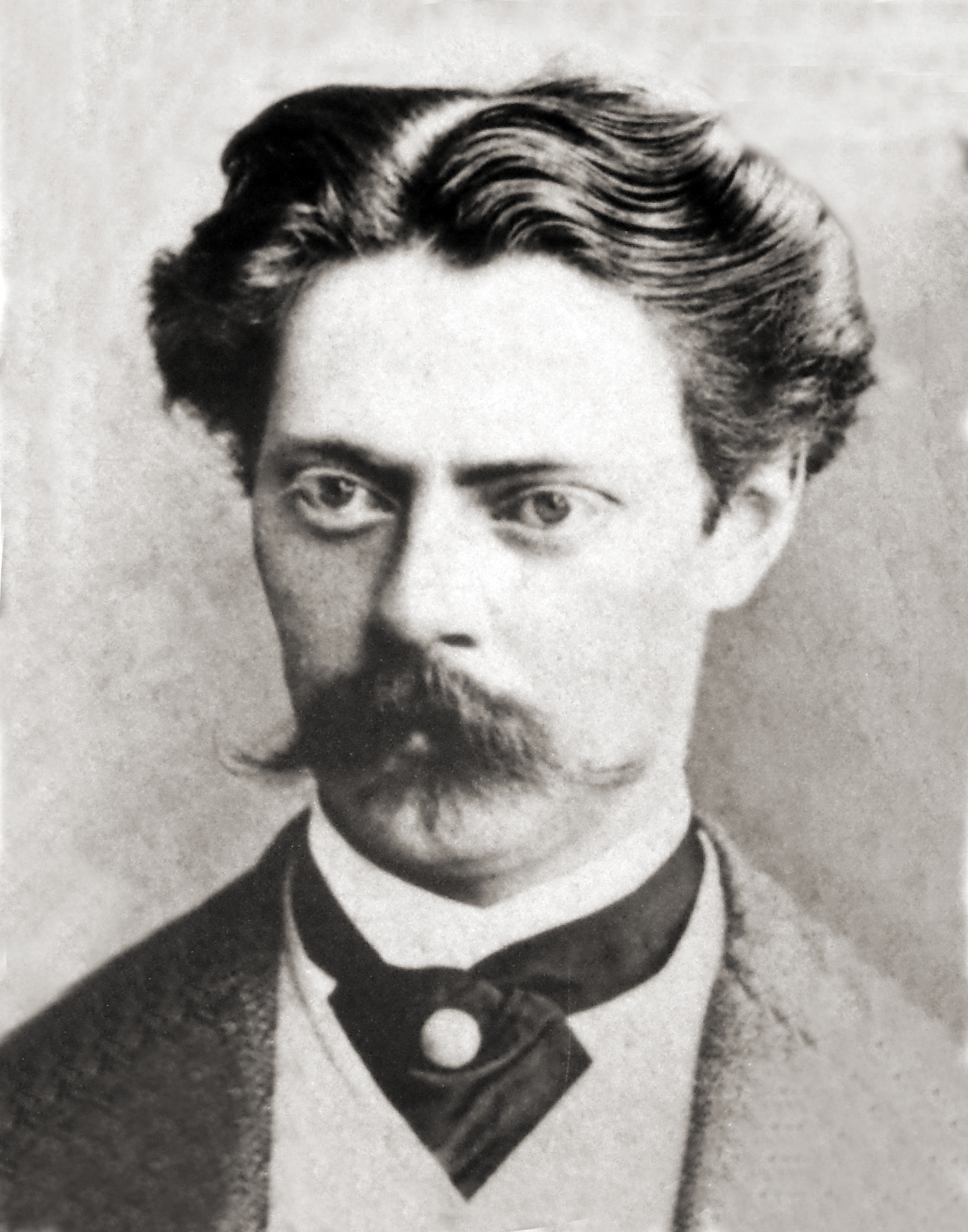
- Born: 18 December 1843
- Died: 19 February 1891 (aged 47)
- Education: University of Rostock
- Scientific career
- Fields: Conchology

Hermann Friedrich Freiherr von Maltzan (18 December 1843, Rostock – 19 February 1891, Berlin) was a German malacologist known for his work in the field of conchology.

A former law student at the University of Rostock, in 1864–65 he undertook an extended scientific journey to France, Spain, Italy and Egypt; a trip in which he collected numerous zoological specimens and expanded his malacological knowledge. In 1879, he traveled to Portugal, where he conducted extensive zoological research in the Algarve region. Afterwards, he continued his research in western Africa (especially French Senegambia), followed by travels to Greece, Crete and Asia Minor. After his return to Germany, he took up residence in Darmstadt and later Berlin (since 1885).

In 1866 he founded the Maltzan`sches Naturhistorisches Museums für Mecklenburg ("Maltzaneum"), a natural history museum that the present-day "Müritzeum", located near the city of Waren, traces its origins to.

Around 1879 he founded the Natural History Institute "Linnaea" in Frankfurt am Main at Große Eschenheimer Straße 45, which was taken over by August Müller after 1882 and later continued in Berlin.

He was the binomial author of numerous malacological species, including several within the land snail genus, Xerocrassa.

== Publications ==
- Zum Cap S. Vincent: Reise durch das Königreich Algarve, 1880.
- Michalis Georgiou, Melidoni by Hermann von Maltzan (1843-1891): a German tragedy about the Cretan Question. (Initial Publication), https://12iccs.proceedings.gr/en/proceedings/category/38/34/558
