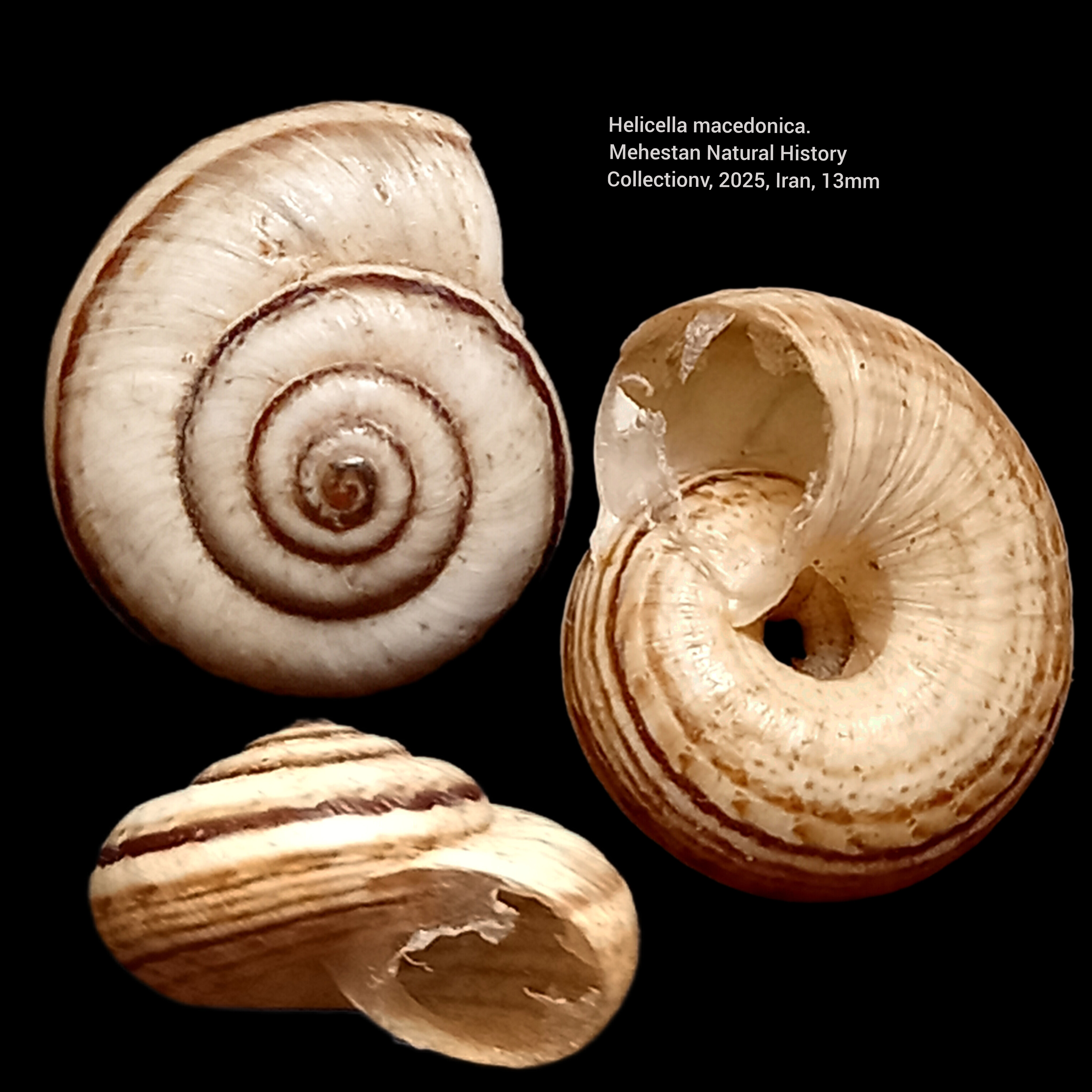
- Helicella macedonica

Scientific classification
- Kingdom: Animalia
- Phylum: Mollusca
- Class: Gastropoda
- Order: Stylommatophora
- Infraorder: Helicoidei
- Superfamily: Helicoidea
- Family: Geomitridae
- Genus: Helicella; Férussac, 1821

Type species
- Helix itala Linnaeus, 1758

Synonyms
- Helicella (Helicella) A. Férussac, 1821; Helicella (Jacosta) Gray, 1821 (new combination); Helix (Helicella) A. Férussac, 1821 (original rank); Planatella Clessin, 1876; Xerobulla Monterosato, 1892; Xerofriga Monterosato, 1892; Xerolaxa Monterosato, 1892

= Helicella =

Genus of gastropods

Helicella is a genus of small to medium-sized, air-breathing land snails, terrestrial pulmonate gastropod mollusks in the subfamily Helicellinae of the family Geomitridae, the hairy snails and their allies.

== Species ==
Species within the genus Helicella include:

- Helicella bolenensis (Locard, 1882)
- Helicella candoni Thach, 2018
- Helicella cistorum (Morelet, 1845)
- Helicella iberica (Rambur, 1869)
- Helicella itala (Linnaeus, 1758) – type species
- Helicella juglans (Gittenberger, 1991)
- Helicella nubigena (Saulcy, 1852)
- Helicella ordunensis (Kobelt, 1883)
- Helicella orzai (Gittenberger & Manga, 1981)
- Helicella sabulivaga (Mabille, 1881)
- Helicella stiparum (Rossmässler, 1854)
- † Helicella striataformis (Lörenthey, 1906)
- Helicella striatitala Prieto, 1985
- Helicella valdeona (Gittenberger & Manga, 1977)

Synonyms

- Helicella arcadiana Schileyko, 1967: synonym of Kalitinaia arcadiana (Schileyko, 1967) (original combination)
- Helicella barcinensis (Bourguignat, 1868): synonym of Xerotricha barcinensis (Bourguignat, 1868) (superseded combination)
- Helicella bierzonaE. Gittenberger & Manga, 1977: synonym for Xerotricha bierzona (Gittenberger & Manga, 1977)
- Helicella cobosi Ortiz de Zárate López, 1962: synonym of Xerocrassa cobosi (Ortiz de Zárate López, 1962) (original combination)
- Helicella corderoi E. Gittenberger & Manga, 1977: synonym of Xerotricha corderoi (E. Gittenberger & Manga, 1977) (original combination)
- Helicella depulsa L. Pintér, 1969: synonym of Xerolenta depulsa (L. Pintér, 1969) (superseded combination, basionym)
- Helicella erjaveci Brusina, 1870: synonym of Vitrea erjaveci (Brusina, 1870) (original combination)
- Helicella frater (Dohrn & Heynemann, 1862): synonym of Xerocrassa frater (Dohrn & Heynemann, 1862) (chresonym)
- Helicella gasulli: synonym for Xerotricha gasulli (Ortiz de Zarate, 1950)
- Helicella jamuzensis E. Gittenberger & Manga, 1977: synonym of Xerotricha jamuzensis (E. Gittenberger & Manga, 1977) (original combination)
- Helicella macedonica P. Hesse, 1928: synonym of Xerolenta macedonica (P. Hesse, 1928) (original combination)
- Helicella mangae E. Gittenberger & Raven, 1982: synonym of Xerotricha gonzalezi (Azpeitia, 1925)
- Helicella mariae:synonym for Xerotricha mariae (Gasull, 1972)
- Helicella mayeri Gude, 1914: synonym of Microxeromagna lowei (Potiez & Michaud, 1838) (junior synonym)
- Helicella nitida (O. F. Müller, 1774): synonym of Zonitoides nitidus (O. F. Müller, 1774) (superseded combination)
- Helicella obvia (Menke, 1828): synonym of Xerolenta obvia (Menke, 1828)(superseded combination)
- Helicella paul-hessei Lindholm, 1936: synonym of Helicopsis paulhessei (Lindholm, 1936): synonym of Helicopsis filimargo filimargo (Krynicki, 18 33): synonym of Helicopsis filimargo (Krynicki, 1833) (original combination)
- †Helicella phrygostriata (Oppenheim, 1919): synonym of † Helicopsis phrygostriata (Oppenheim, 1919)
- Helicella rhabdotoides (A. J. Wagner, 1928) synonym of Candidula rhabdotoides (A. J. Wagner, 1928) (invalid combination)
- Helicella seetzeni (L. Pfeiffer, 1847): synonym of Xerocrassa seetzeni (L. Pfeiffer, 1847)
- Helicella spiruloides A. J. Wagner in Hesse, 1916: synonym of Xerolenta spiruloides (A. J. Wagner, 1916) (original combination)
- Helicella syrensis (L. Pfeiffer, 1846): synonym of Candidula syrensis (L. Pfeiffer, 1846) (superseded combination)
- Helicella tumulorum (Webb & Berthelot, 1833): synonym of Monilearia tumulorum (Webb & Berthelot, 1833) (chresonym)
- Helicella turolensis Ortiz de Zárate López, 1963: synonym of Xerocrassa turolensis (Ortiz de Zárate López, 1963) (original combination)
- Helicella virgata (da Costa, 1778): synonym of Cernuella virgata (Da Costa, 1778) (superseded generic combination)
- Helicella zaratei: synonym for Xerotricha zaratei (Gittenberger & Manga, 1977)
- Helicella zujarensis: synonym for Xerotricha zujarensis (Ortiz de Zarate, 1950)

Taxa inquirenda

- Helicella hamacenica (Bourguignat, 1883))
- † Helicella libidinosa Steklov, 1966
- Helicella subnivellina (Bourguignat, 1883)
- † Helicella sunzhica Steklov, 1966
