= Spire (mollusc) =

Part of a mollusc shell

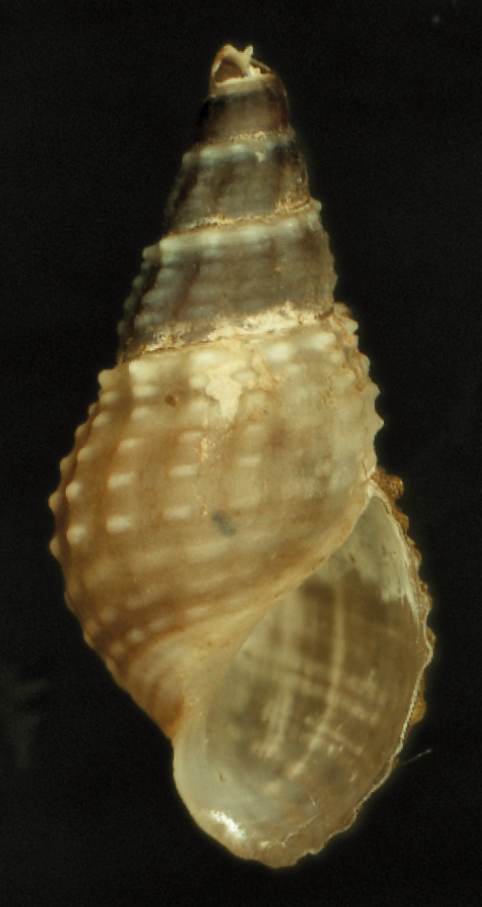
Apertural view of the shell of adult Tarebia granifera showing its pale brown body whorl and dark spire.

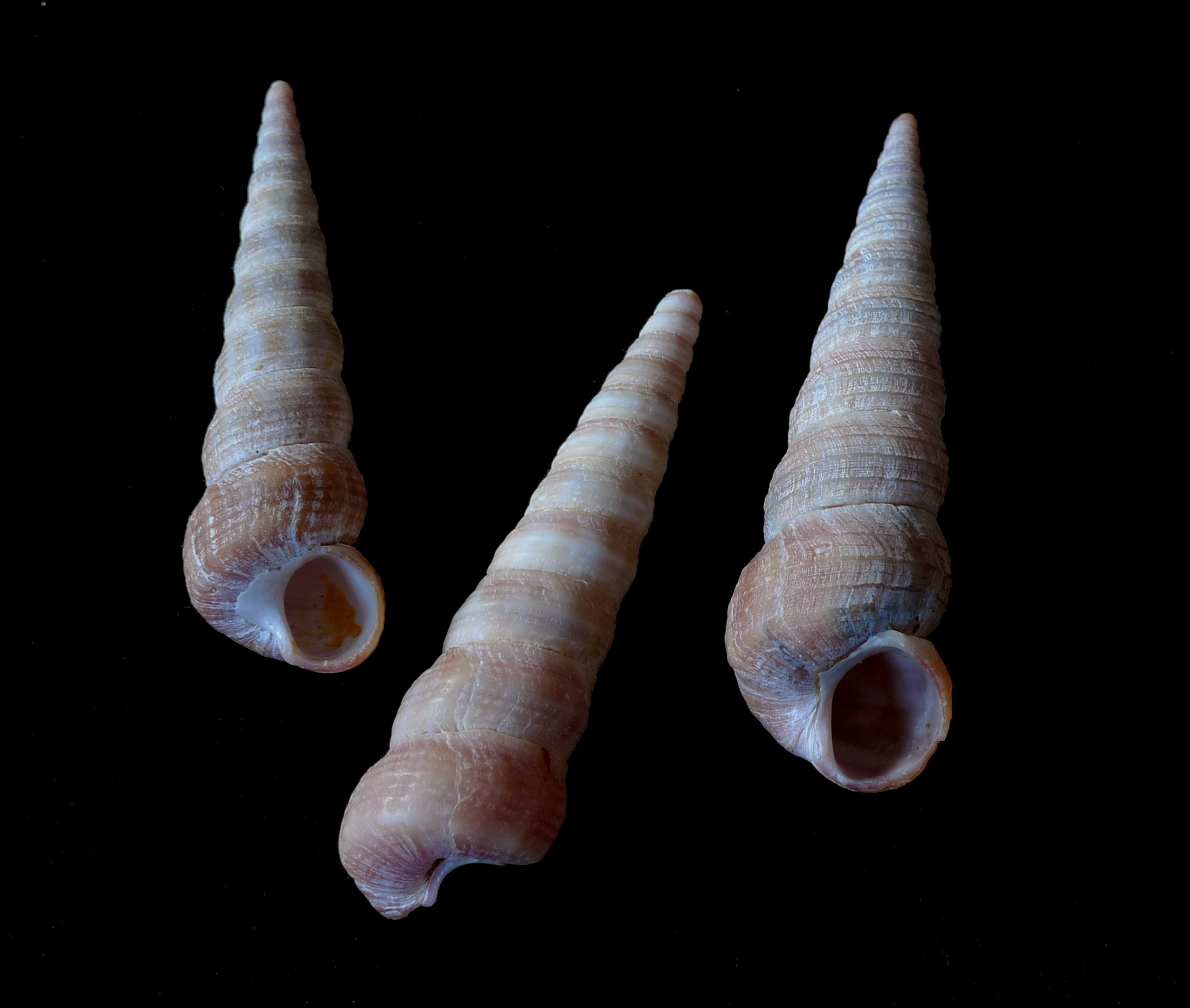
Very high-spired shells of the sea snail species Turritella communis

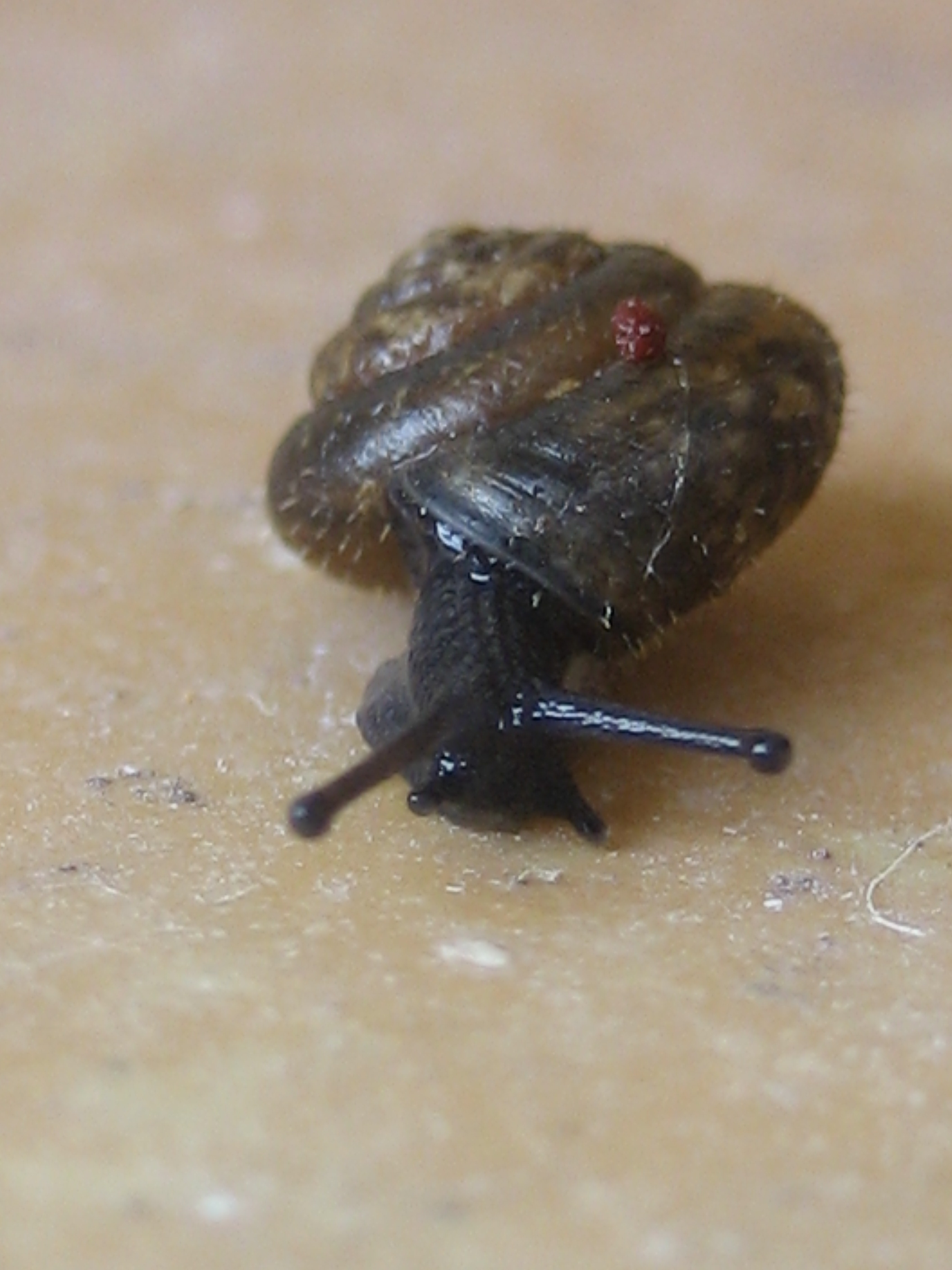
Medium-spired shell (live individual) of a European land snail, probably Trochulus hispidus

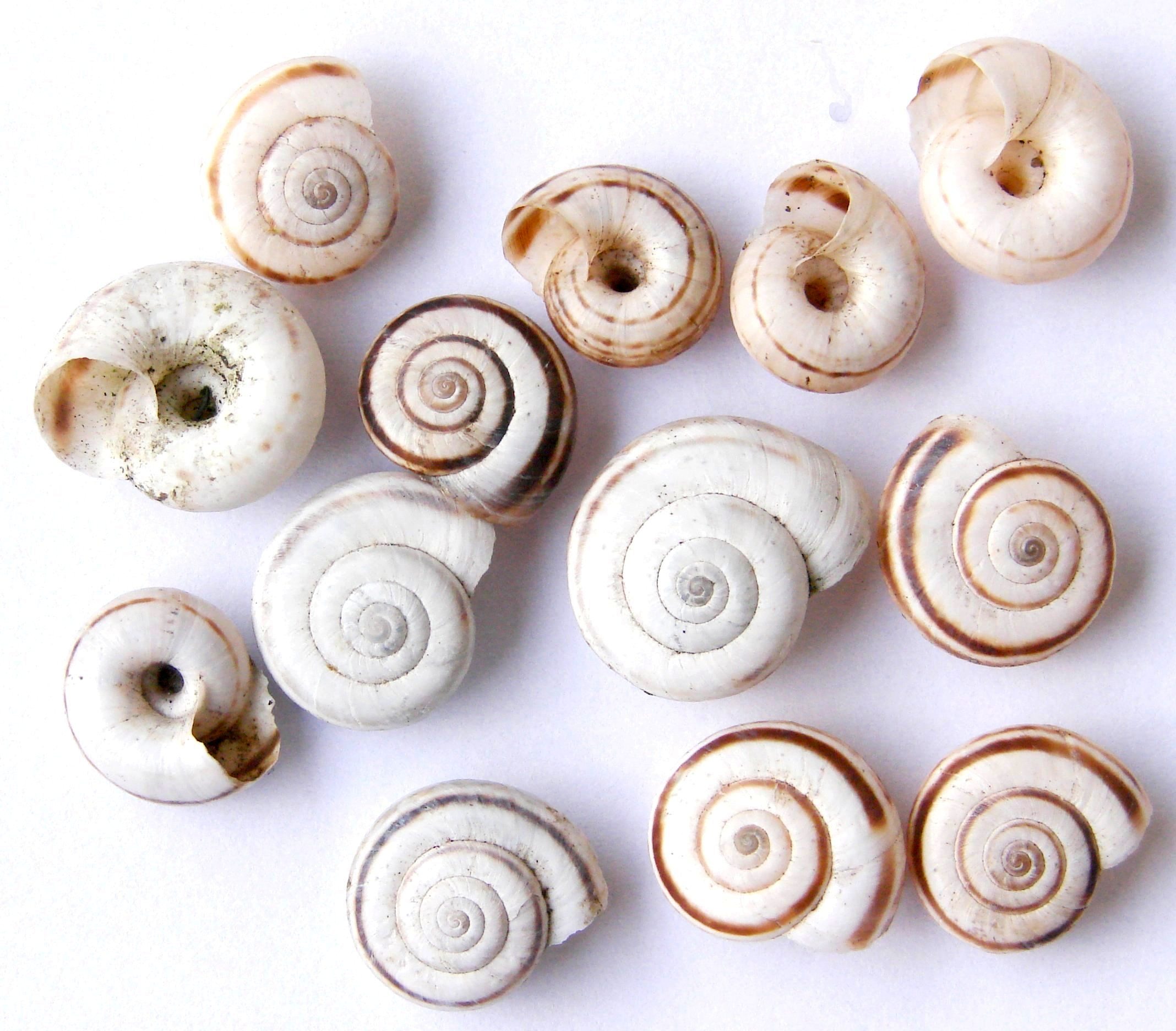
Very low-spired shells of the land snail species Xerolenta obvia

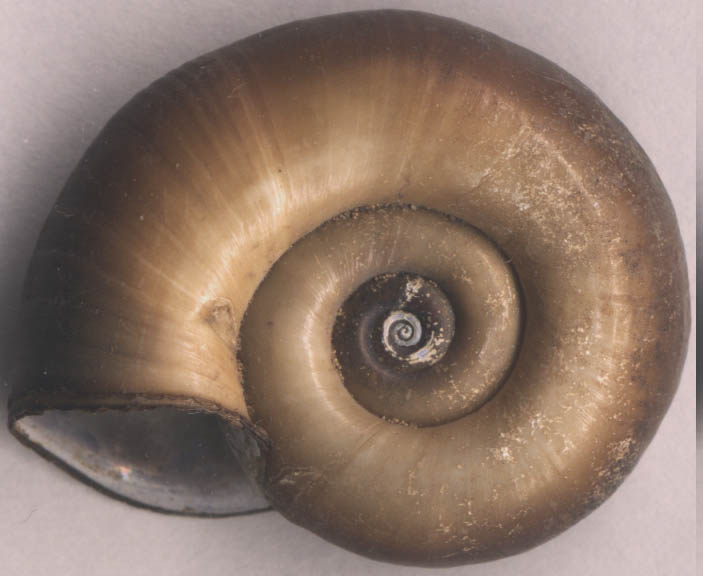
The sinistral shell of the freshwater snail Planorbarius corneus, a view of the sunken spire, which is held facing downwards in life

A spire is a part of the coiled shell of molluscs. The spire consists of all of the whorls except for the body whorl. Each spire whorl represents a rotation of 360°. A spire is part of the shell of a snail, a gastropod mollusc, a gastropod shell, and also the whorls of the shell in ammonites, which are fossil shelled cephalopods.

In textbook illustrations of gastropod shells, the tradition (with a few exceptions) is to show most shells with the spire uppermost on the page.

The spire, when it is not damaged or eroded, includes the protoconch (also called the nuclear whorls or the larval shell), and most of the subsequent teleoconch whorls (also called the postnuclear whorls), which gradually increase in area as they are formed. Thus the spire in most gastropods is pointed, the tip being known as the "apex". The word "spire" is used in analogy to a church spire or rock spire; a high, thin, pinnacle.

The "spire angle" is the angle, as seen from the apex, at which a spire increases in area. It is an angle formed by imaginary lines tangent to the spire.

Some gastropod shells have very high spires (the shell is much higher than wide), some have low spires (the shell is much wider than high), and there are all possible grades between.

The elevation of the spire is defined by the angle of the whorls relative to the central axis (e.g., high-spired or depressed). Separately, the tightness of coiling is determined by the rate at which the whorls increase in diameter (the whorl expansion rate). These two factors combine to determine the overall apical angle of the shell.

In a few gastropod families the shells are not helical in their coiling, but instead are planispiral, flat-coiled. In these shells, the spire does not have a raised point, but instead is sunken.

Snails with high spires tend to prefer vertical surfaces while those with low spires prefer horizontal surfaces. This is thought to aid in reducing competition between high and low-spired species in a habitat. Snails with middle-height spires show little preference to surface angle.

Gastropod shells that are not spirally coiled (for example shells of limpets) have no columella.

== Decollated shells ==
In some species, as high-spired shells become adult, the soft parts of the animal cease to occupy the upper parts of the cavity of the shell. The space thus vacated is sometimes filled with solid shell, as in Magilus; or it is partitioned off, as in Vermetus, Euomphalus, Turritella, Triton or Caecum. The empty apex in these shells is sometimes very thin, and becomes brittle. In some species it breaks away, leaving the shell truncated or decollated. Decollated shells usually have the whorls of the spire closely wound and not increasing much in diameter. A typical example is the decollate snail (Rumina decollata).

== The form of a shell ==
The form of the shell of a gastropod is usually regular in coiling, and is normally a cone curved into a spiral, and descending in a screw-like manner from the apex or initial whorl to the aperture. The shell grows in a regular geometrical progression in its normal pattern, although these modes vary among themselves widely. Thus we have the simple depressed cone of Patella, all aperture and no spire. From it there is every gradation, from the Haliotis, almost equally depressed and broad, the result, however, of a very rapidly enlarging spiral, to the long, many-whorled Turritella or Vermetus, which is a Turritella partially unrolled into a simple long tube — the opposite of the Patella.

== Different types of spire ==
See also : Gastropod shell#Shape of the shell

- Turbinoform or Turbinate: having a broadly conical spire and a convex base, as in Turbo, turban-shaped.
- Turriform: with a many-whorled, slender spire, as in Turritella.

== Chirality ==
In most spiral shells the spire normally curves to the right, that is to say, placing the shell with its apex turned upward from the observer and its aperture in view : the aperture will be on the right hand side. In others the volutions proceed in the opposite direction with such regularity as to be eminently characteristic of some species and genera (Physa, Clausilia, etc.). However, in certain genera, it is found that species normally dextral will exceptionally produce sinistrally coiled shells, and vice versa. This abnormal growth probably is caused by disturbance of the relations of the embryo with its initial shell.
