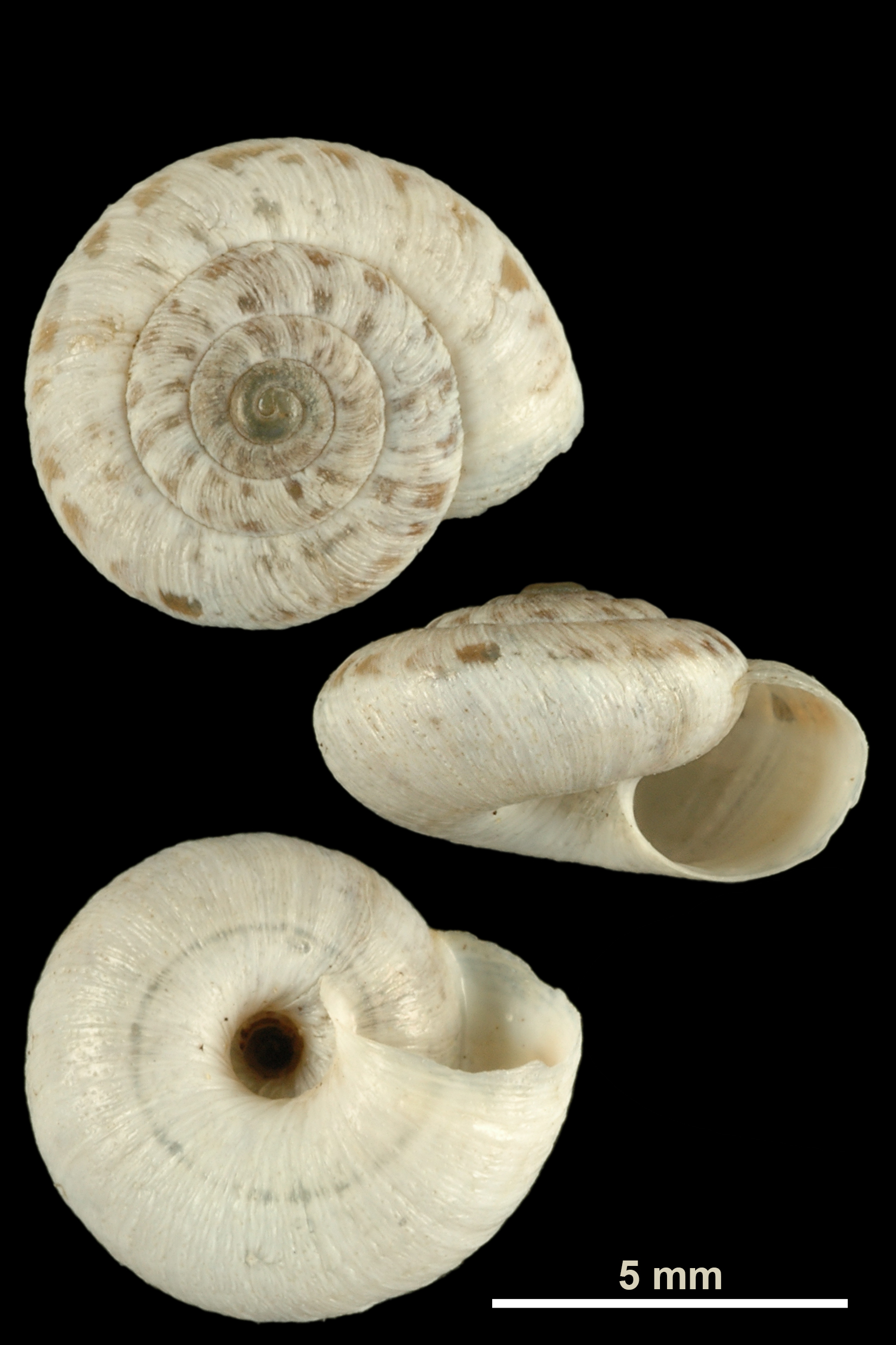
- Shell of Xerotricha renei (specimen at MNHN, Paris)

Scientific classification
- Kingdom: Animalia
- Phylum: Mollusca
- Class: Gastropoda
- Order: Stylommatophora
- Family: Geomitridae
- Genus: Xerotricha
- Species: X. renei

Binomial name
- Xerotricha renei (Fagot, 1882)

Synonyms
- Helix renei Fagot, 1882 superseded combination

= Xerotricha renei =

Species of gastropod

rip

Xerotricha renei is a species of air-breathing land snail, terrestrial pulmonate gastropod mollusks in the family Geomitridae,

== Description ==
The length of the shell attains 5 mm, its diameter 7 mm.

(Original description in Latin) The shell is solidly built and shaped in a rounded-convex form, variegated with shades of brown and gray. It features an open umbilicus that extends all the way to the apex. Its surface is marked by irregular fine ribs and striae, and it is adorned with minute dots within the spaces between the striae, as well as sparse hairs.

The spire is convex, ending in a prominent, nipple-shaped apex. It consists of five convex whorls that are separated by an impressed suture; the initial whorls increase slowly in size, while the remaining ones expand rapidly. The body whorl is larger, rounded, and becomes dilated and descending as it approaches the aperture.

The margins of the aperture lie close together, with the columellar margin slightly reflected over the umbilicus.

This species, dedicated to Jules-René Bourguignat, may be distinguished by its convex spire, the complete absence of any band or spotting, its color of an earthy yellow tinged with grayish tones, its whorls that increase in size differently, and its aperture that descends lower and is more regularly rounded, among other features.

== Distribution ==
This species is endemic to France and occurs off Haute-Garonne; also in French mainland, Spanish mainland and Central Europe.
