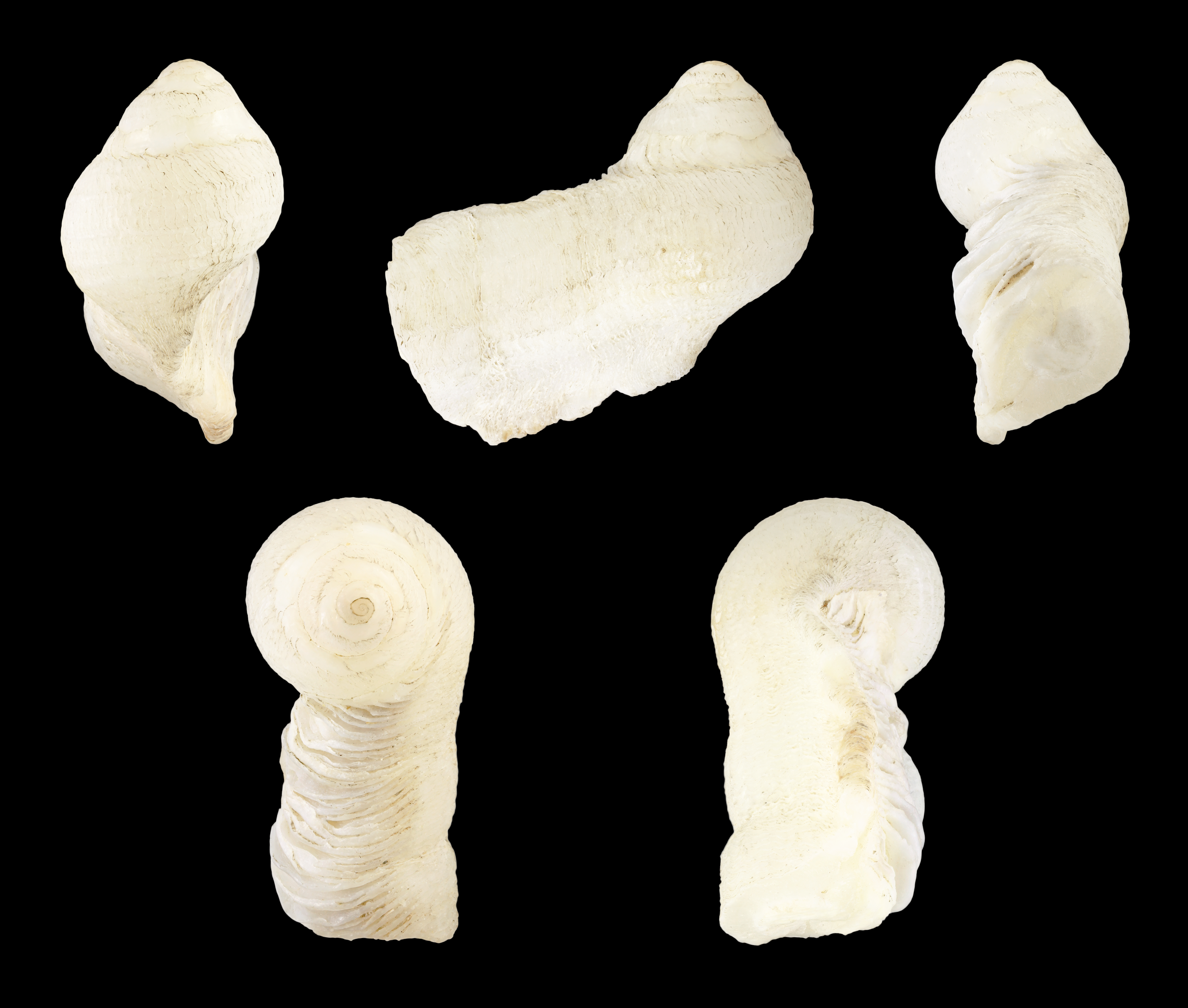

Scientific classification
- Kingdom: Animalia
- Phylum: Mollusca
- Class: Gastropoda
- Subclass: Caenogastropoda
- Order: Neogastropoda
- Family: Muricidae
- Genus: Magilus
- Species: M. antiquus

Binomial name
- Magilus antiquus Montfort, 1810

Synonyms
- Leptoconchus cumingii Deshayes, G.P., 1863; Leptoconchus cuvieri Deshayes, G.P., 1863; Leptoconchus ruppelli Deshayes, G.P., 1863; Magilus antiquatus (misspelling of specific epithet); Magilus globulosus Sowerby, G.B. III, 1872; Magilus microcephalus Sowerby, G.B. III, 1872; Magilus peronii Lamarck, J.B.P.A. de, 1818; Magilus serratus Sowerby, G.B. III, 1872

= Magilus antiquus =

Species of gastropod

Magilus antiquus, common name the Magilus coral snail, is a species of sea snail, a marine gastropod mollusk in the family Muricidae, the murex snails or rock snails. It has been described in the past as 'remarkable'.

== Description ==
The shell size varies between 20 mm and 150 mm.

== Distribution ==
This species is found in the Red Sea, the Indian Ocean along Aldabra, Madagascar, Mauritius and Tanzania and in the Pacific Ocean along New Zealand.
