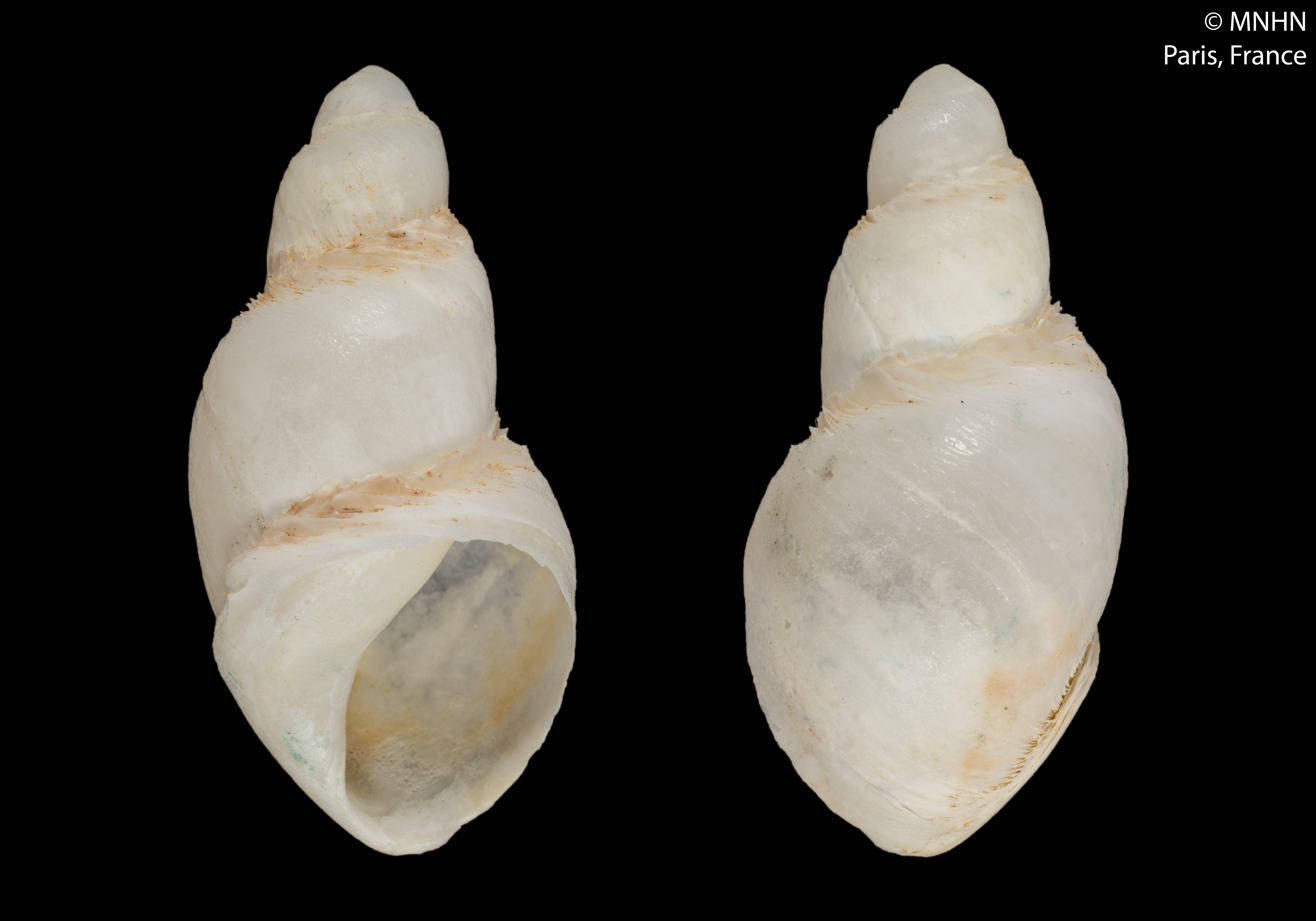

Scientific classification
- Kingdom: Animalia
- Phylum: Mollusca
- Class: Gastropoda
- Subclass: Caenogastropoda
- Order: Neogastropoda
- Superfamily: Muricoidea
- Family: Muricidae
- Subfamily: Coralliophilinae
- Genus: Magilus
- Species: M. latens

Binomial name
- Magilus latens Bozzetti, 2011

= Magilus latens =

Species of gastropod

Magilus latens is a species of sea snail, a marine gastropod mollusk, in the family Muricidae, the murex snails or rock snails.
