= Xerotricha madritensis =

Scientific classification
- Kingdom: Animalia
- Phylum: Mollusca
- Class: Gastropoda
- Order: Stylommatophora
- Family: Geomitridae
- Genus: Xerotricha
- Species: X. madritensis

Binomial name
- Xerotricha madritensis (Rambur, 1868)

Synonyms
- Helicella (Xerotricha) parabarcinensis Ortiz de Zárate López, 1946 (junior synonym); Helicella barcinensis (Bourguignat, 1868) superseded combination; Helicella madritensis (Rambur, 1868) superseded combination; Helix barcinensis Bourguignat, 1864 nomen nudum (replacement name for Helix caperata Rossmassler); Helix barcinensis Bourguignat, 1868 junior subjective synonym (original name); Helix barcinonensis Chia, 1886 (unnecessary replacement name); Helix culmi Fagot, 1888 (junior synonym); Helix madritensis Rambur, 1868 superseded combination (basionym); Helix marceti Fagot, 1906 (junior synonym); Helix mascarenasi Fagot, 1888 (junior synonym); Helix moreri Fagot, 1886 unaccepted (junior synonym); Helix pallaresica Fagot, 1886 superseded combination (basionym); Helix salvanae Fagot, 1886 junior subjective synonym (original name); Helix segetum Fagot, 1888 (junior synonym); Xerocrassa (Amandana) madritensis (Rambur, 1868) alternate representation; Xerocrassa (Amandana) pallaresica (Fagot, 1886) alternate representation; Xerocrassa (Amandana) salvanae (Fagot, 1886) alternate representation; Xerocrassa madritensis (Rambur, 1868) superseded combination; Xerocrassa pallaresica (Fagot, 1886) junior subjective synonym; Xerocrassa salvanae (Fagot, 1886) junior subjective synonym; Xerotricha barcinensis (Bourguignat, 1868) junior subjective synonym

Species of gastropod

Xerotricha madritensis is a species of air-breathing land snail, a pulmonate gastropod mollusk in the family Geometridae, the hairy snails and their allies.

== Distribution ==
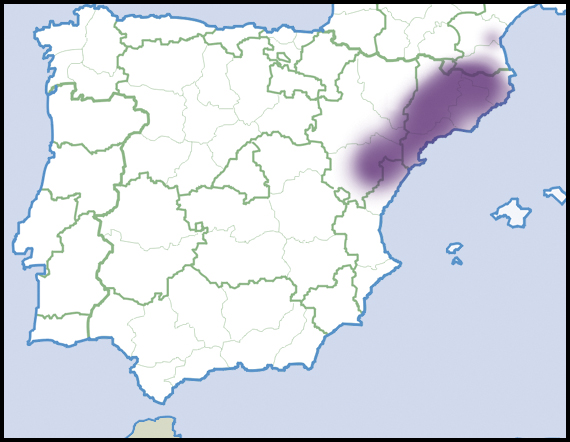
Distribution

This species is native to Spain, Andorra and France.

== Taxonomic note ==
IUCN considers X. pallaresica a synonym of Xerotricha madritensis, which is itself a subject of taxonomic ambiguity.
