= Helicella orzai =

Conservation status
- Near Threatened (IUCN 3.1)

Scientific classification
- Kingdom: Animalia
- Phylum: Mollusca
- Class: Gastropoda
- Order: Stylommatophora
- Family: Geomitridae
- Genus: Helicella
- Species: H. orzai

Binomial name
- Helicella orzai Gittenberger & Manga, 1981
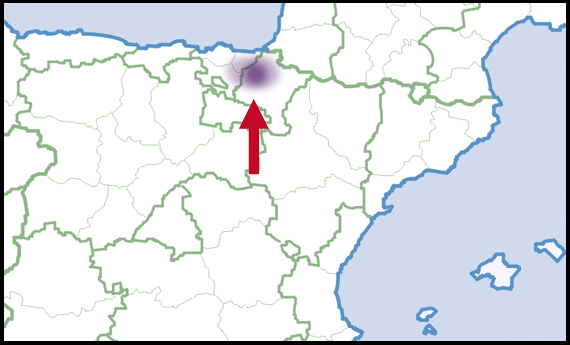
- Distribution

Species of gastropod

Helicella orzai is a species of land snail in the family Geomitridae, the hairy snails and their allies. It is endemic to Spain.

== Distribution ==
This snail occurs in the eastern Basque Country and in northern Navarre. It can be found in the Aizkorri and Aralar Ranges and on Lindux Mountain. It lives under rocks in dry, open habitat types. The population is thought to be stable and there are few threats.
