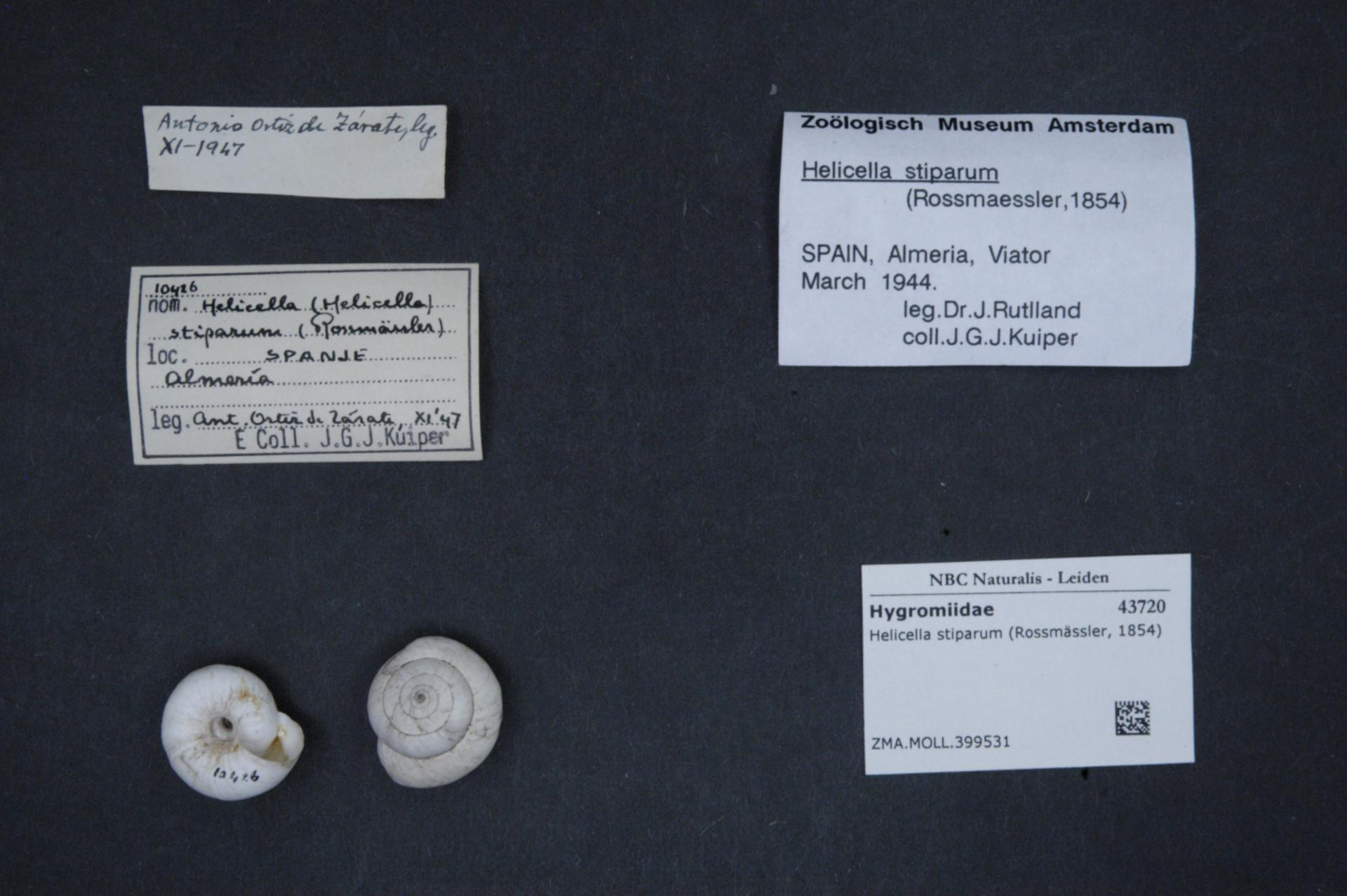

Conservation status
- Endangered (IUCN 3.1)

Scientific classification
- Kingdom: Animalia
- Phylum: Mollusca
- Class: Gastropoda
- Order: Stylommatophora
- Family: Geomitridae
- Genus: Helicella
- Species: H. stiparum

Binomial name
- Helicella stiparum Rossmassler, 1854
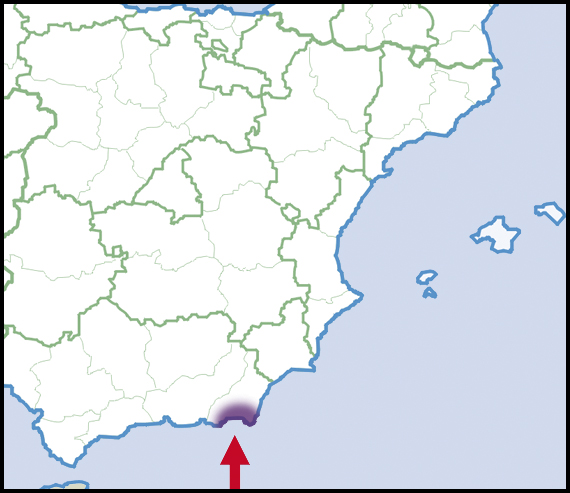
- Distribution

Synonyms
- Helix stiparumItal Rossmässler, 1854 (original combination)

= Helicella stiparum =

Species of gastropod

Helicella stiparum is a species of air-breathing land snails, terrestrial pulmonate gastropod mollusks in the family Geomitridae, the hairy snails and their allies.

== Distribution ==
This species is endemic to Spain.
