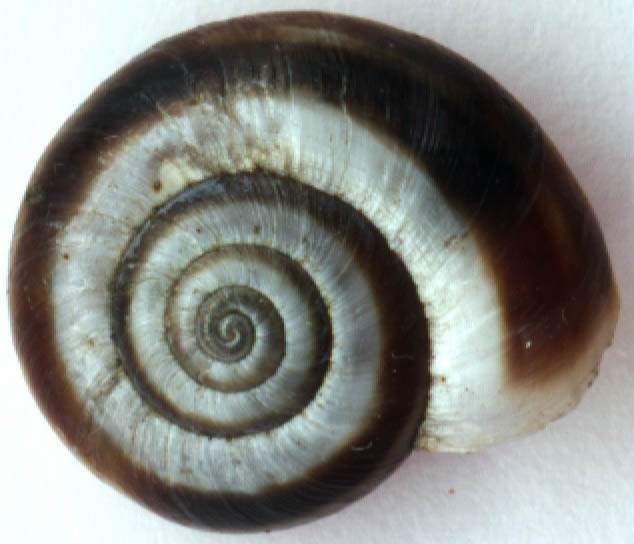
- Apical view of the shell of Xerolenta obvia

Scientific classification
- Kingdom: Animalia
- Phylum: Mollusca
- Class: Gastropoda
- Order: Stylommatophora
- Family: Geomitridae
- Subfamily: Helicellinae
- Tribe: Helicopsini
- Genus: Xerolenta; Monterosato, 1892

Type species
- Helix obvia Menke, 1828

Synonyms
- Helicella (Xerothracia) Schütt, 1962 (junior synonym)

= Xerolenta =

Genus of gastropods

Xerolenta is a genus of air-breathing land snails, terrestrial pulmonate gastropod molluscs in the family Geomitridae.

== Species ==
Species in the genus Xerolenta include:

- Xerolenta macedonica (Hesse, 1928)
- Xerolenta obvia (Menke, 1828)
- Xerolenta spiruloides (Wagner & Hesse, 1916)
- Xerolenta thasia (Reischütz, 1983)

Synonyms

- Xerolenta candicans Pfeiffer, 1841: synonym of Helicella obvia (Menke, 1828)
- Xerolenta razlogi | (Pintér, 1969): synonym of Xerolenta obvia razlogi (L. Pintér, 1969)

Taxon inquiriendum

- Xerolenta depulsa (L. Pintér, 1969)
