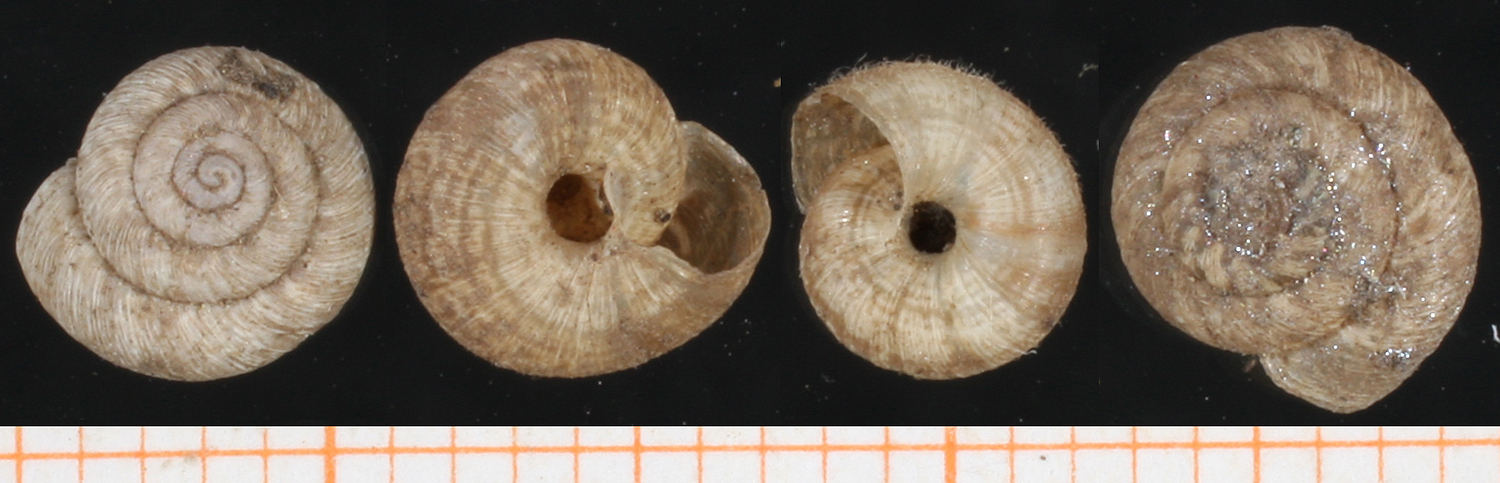
- Xerotricha conspurcata shells

Scientific classification
- Kingdom: Animalia
- Phylum: Mollusca
- Class: Gastropoda
- Order: Stylommatophora
- Family: Geomitridae
- Subfamily: Helicellinae
- Genus: Xerotricha; Monterosato, 1892

Type species
- Helix conspurcata Draparnaud, 1801

Synonyms
- Castellana Hatch, Milton & Armitage, 1970; Helicella (Xerotricha) Monterosato, 1892 ·; Helix (Xerotricha) Monterosato, 1892 ·; Jabalconia Ortiz de Zárate López, 1952 ·; Polytrichia Pallary, 1922 ·; Pseudoxerotricha Ortiz de Zárate, 1950; Xeromicra Monterosato, 1892; Xerophila (Polytrichia) Pallary, 1922 ·; Xerophila (Xerotricha) Monterosato, 1892

= Xerotricha =

Genus of gastropods

Xerotricha is a genus of small air-breathing land snails, a terrestrial pulmonate gastropod mollusks in the subfamily Helicellinae of the family Geomitridae.

== Species ==
Species in the genus Xerotricha include:

- Xerotricha adoptata (Mousson, 1872)
- Xerotricha apicina (Lamarck, 1822)
- Xerotricha bierzona (Gittenberger & Manga, 1977)
- Xerotricha conspurcata (Draparnaud, 1801) - type species
- Xerotricha corderoi (Gittenberger & Manga, 1977)
- Xerotricha gasulli (Ortiz de Zárate y López, 1950)
- Xerotricha gonzalezi (Azpeitia Moros, 1925)
- Xerotricha huidobroi (Azpeitia Moros, 1925)
- Xerotricha jamuzensis (Gittenberger & Manga, 1977)
- Xerotricha lancerottensis (Webb & Berthelot, 1833)
- Xerotricha madritensis (Rambur, 1868)
- Xerotricha nodosostriata (Mousson, 1872) (uncertain)
- Xerotricha nubivaga (Mabille, 1882)
- Xerotricha orbignii (d'Orbigny, 1836)
- Xerotricha pavida (Mousson, 1872)
- Xerotricha renei (Fagot, 1882)
- Xerotricha silosensis (Ortiz de Zárate y López, 1950)
- Xerotricha vatonniana (Bourguignat, 1867)
- Xerotricha zaratei (Gittenberger & Manga, 1977)
- Xerotricha zujarensis (Ortiz de Zárate y López, 1950)

Synonyms

- Xerotricha barcinensis (Bourguignat, 1868): synonym of Xerotricha madritensis (Rambur, 1868) (junior subjective synonym)
- Xerotricha mariae (Gasull, 1972): synonym of Xerotricha conspurcata (Draparnaud, 1801)
