= Helicella striatitala =

Conservation status
- Least Concern (IUCN 3.1)

Scientific classification
- Kingdom: Animalia
- Phylum: Mollusca
- Class: Gastropoda
- Order: Stylommatophora
- Family: Geomitridae
- Genus: Helicella
- Species: H. striatitala

Binomial name
- Helicella striatitala Prieto, 1985
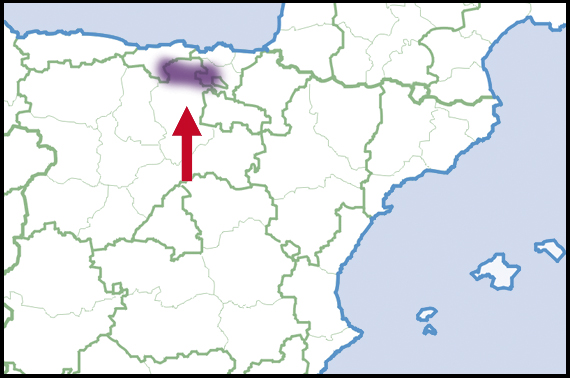
- Distribution

Species of gastropod

Helicella striatitala is a species of air-breathing land snail, a terrestrial pulmonate gastropod mollusc in the family Geomitridae, the hairy snails and their allies.

== Distribution ==
This species is endemic to Spain.
