= Magilus ellipticus =

Scientific classification
- Kingdom: Animalia
- Phylum: Mollusca
- Class: Gastropoda
- Subclass: Caenogastropoda
- Order: Neogastropoda
- Superfamily: Muricoidea
- Family: Muricidae
- Subfamily: Coralliophilinae
- Genus: Magilus
- Species: M. ellipticus

Binomial name
- Magilus ellipticus G. B. Sowerby I, 1823

Synonyms
- Leptoconchus ellipticus (G. B. Sowerby I, 1823)

Species of gastropod

Magilus ellipticus is a species of sea snail, a marine gastropod mollusk, in the family Muricidae, the murex snails or rock snails.
