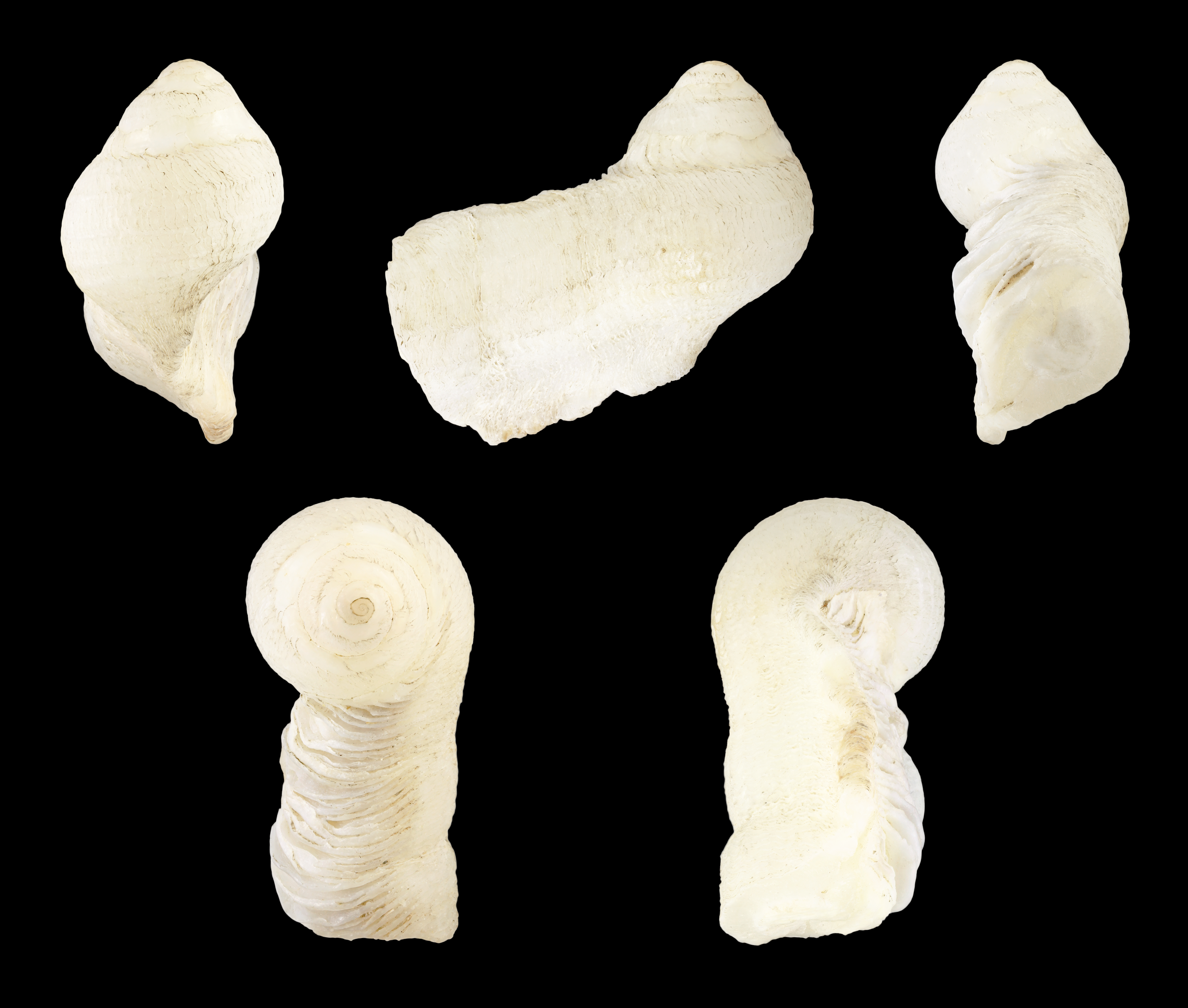
- Magilus antiquus

Scientific classification
- Kingdom: Animalia
- Phylum: Mollusca
- Class: Gastropoda
- Subclass: Caenogastropoda
- Order: Neogastropoda
- Superfamily: Muricoidea
- Family: Muricidae
- Subfamily: Coralliophilinae
- Genus: Magilus; Montfort, 1810

Type species
- Magilus antiquus Montfort, P.D. de, 1810

Synonyms
- Campulotus Guettard, 1770 (nomen oblitum)

= Magilus =

Genus of gastropods

Magilus is a genus of sea snails, marine gastropod mollusks in the family Muricidae, the murex snails or rock snails.

This genus was brought by Michel (1988) into the separate family Magilidae together with Latiaxis

== Description ==
Animal: The mantle-margin is thickened, the siphon very short. The foot is large, fleshy and oval.

The operculum is ovate, the nucleus sublateral.

Shell: The shell, when young, is spiral and, thin. When adult, it is white, solid, tubular and spiral for three or four whorls. The body whorl is prolonged into an irregular, straight or flexuous tube, solid posteriorly, and with a siphonal keel on the left side.

This curious genus lives in coral, and the inordinate extension of the lips of the shell is to enable the animal to keep on a level with the surface of the coral as it continues to increase in size. As the shell grows, the tube behind is filled up with solid calcareous matter.

== Species ==
Species within the genus Magilus include:

- Magilus antiquus Montfort, 1810
- Magilus lankae Deraniyagala, 1968
- Magilus latens Bozzetti, 2011
- Magilus sowerbyi Massin, 1982

Species brought into synonymy

- Magilus antiquatus Linnaeus: synonym of Magilus antiquus Montfort, 1810
- Magilus costatus G. B. Sowerby II, 1872: synonym of Magilus sowerbyi Massin, 1982 (invalid: junior homonym of Magilus costatus Chenu, 1843; M. sowerbyi is a replacement name)
- Magilus cumingii (H. Adams & A. Adams, 1864): synonym of Coralliophila cumingii (H. Adams & A. Adams, 1864)
- Magilus djedah Chenu, 1843: synonym of Leptoconchus djedah (Chenu, 1843) (original combination)
- Magilus ellipticus G. B. Sowerby I, 1823: synonym of Leptoconchus ellipticus (G. B. Sowerby I, 1823) (original combination)
- Magilus fimbriatus A. Adams, 1852: synonym of Coralliophila fimbriata (A. Adams, 1852)
- Magilus globulosus Sowerby, G.B. III, 1872 : synonym of Magilus antiquus Montfort, 1810
- Magilus japonicus Deraniyagala, 1968: synonym of Magilus antiquus japonicus Deraniyagala, 1968 (original rank)
- Magilus lamarckii (Deshayes, 1863) : synonym of Leptoconchus lamarckii Deshayes, 1863
- Magilus macrocephalus G. B. Sowerby III, 1919: synonym of Magilus microcephalus G. B. Sowerby II, 1872: synonym of Magilus antiquus Montfort, 1810 (described in synonymy)
- Magilus microcephalus Sowerby, G.B. III, 1872: synonym of Magilus antiquus
- Magilus peronii Lamarck, J.B.P.A. de, 1818: synonym of Magilus antiquus
- Magilus serratus Sowerby, G.B. III, 1872: synonym of Magilus antiquus
- Magilus solidiusculus G. B. Sowerby II, 1872: synonym of Leptoconchus solidiusculus (G. B. Sowerby II, 1872) (original combination)
- Magilus striatus (Rüppell, 1835): synonym of Leptoconchus striatus Rüppell, 1835
- Magilus tenuis Chenu, 1843: synonym of Leptoconchus tenuis (Chenu, 1843) (original combination)
