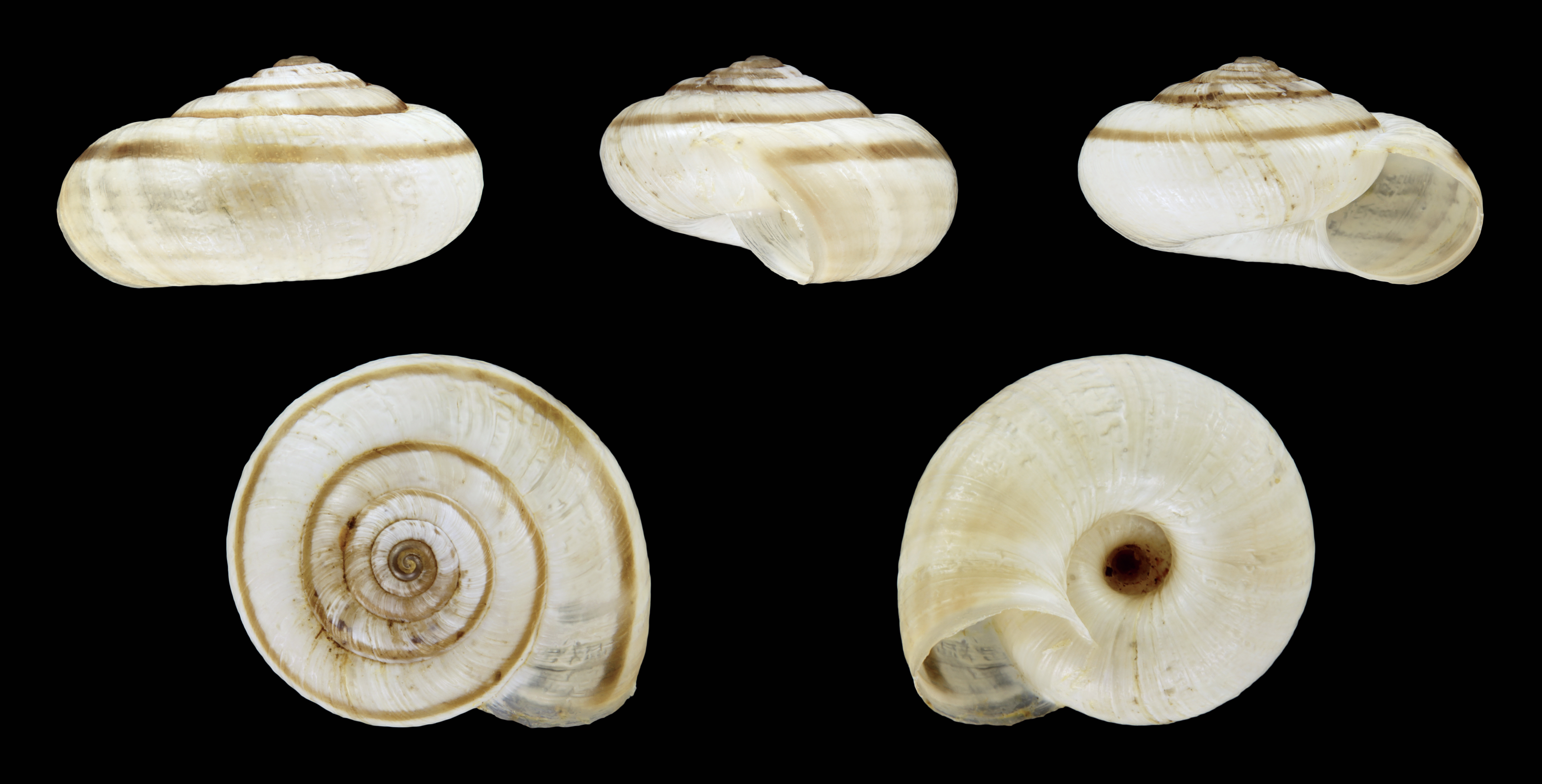
- shell of Helicella itala

Scientific classification
- Kingdom: Animalia
- Phylum: Mollusca
- Class: Gastropoda
- Order: Stylommatophora
- Family: Geomitridae
- Genus: Helicella
- Species: H. itala

Binomial name
- Helicella itala (Linnaeus, 1758)
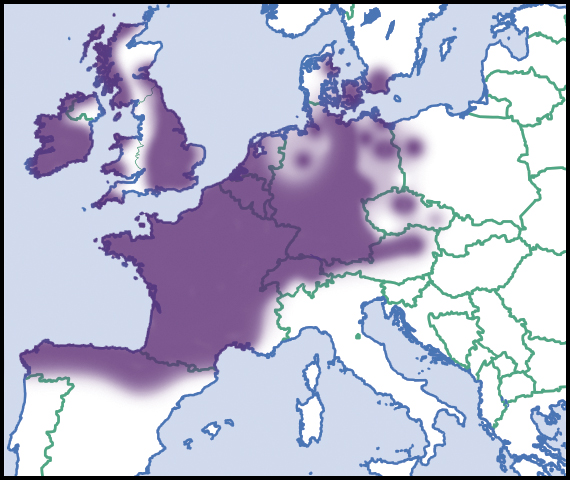
- Distribution

Synonyms
- Helicella (Helicella) itala (Linnaeus, 1758); Helix itala Linnaeus, 1758 (original combination)

= Helicella itala =

Species of gastropod

Helicella itala is a species of medium-sized, air-breathing land snail, a terrestrial pulmonate gastropod mollusc in the family Geomitridae, the hairy snails and their allies.

The English common name for this species is heath snail.

Subspecies

- Helicella itala itala (Linnaeus, 1758)
- Helicella itala pampelonensis (A. Schmidt, 1855)

== Life cycle ==
The width of the egg is 1.5 mm.

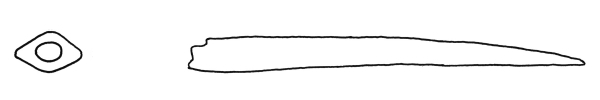
Drawing of a love dart of Helicella itala.

This species of snail makes and uses love darts during mating.

== Description ==
The 12–20 mm. shell is broad and very depressed with an open coil forming a convex, low spire. The umbilicus is very wide. The whorls are slightly convex, and have shallow sutures. The aperture is elliptical and lacks an internal rib. The surface (periostracum) is white or pale yellow-brown. The shell often (but not always) has dark brown or yellow-brown spiral bands, and the surface has fine irregular growth ridges.

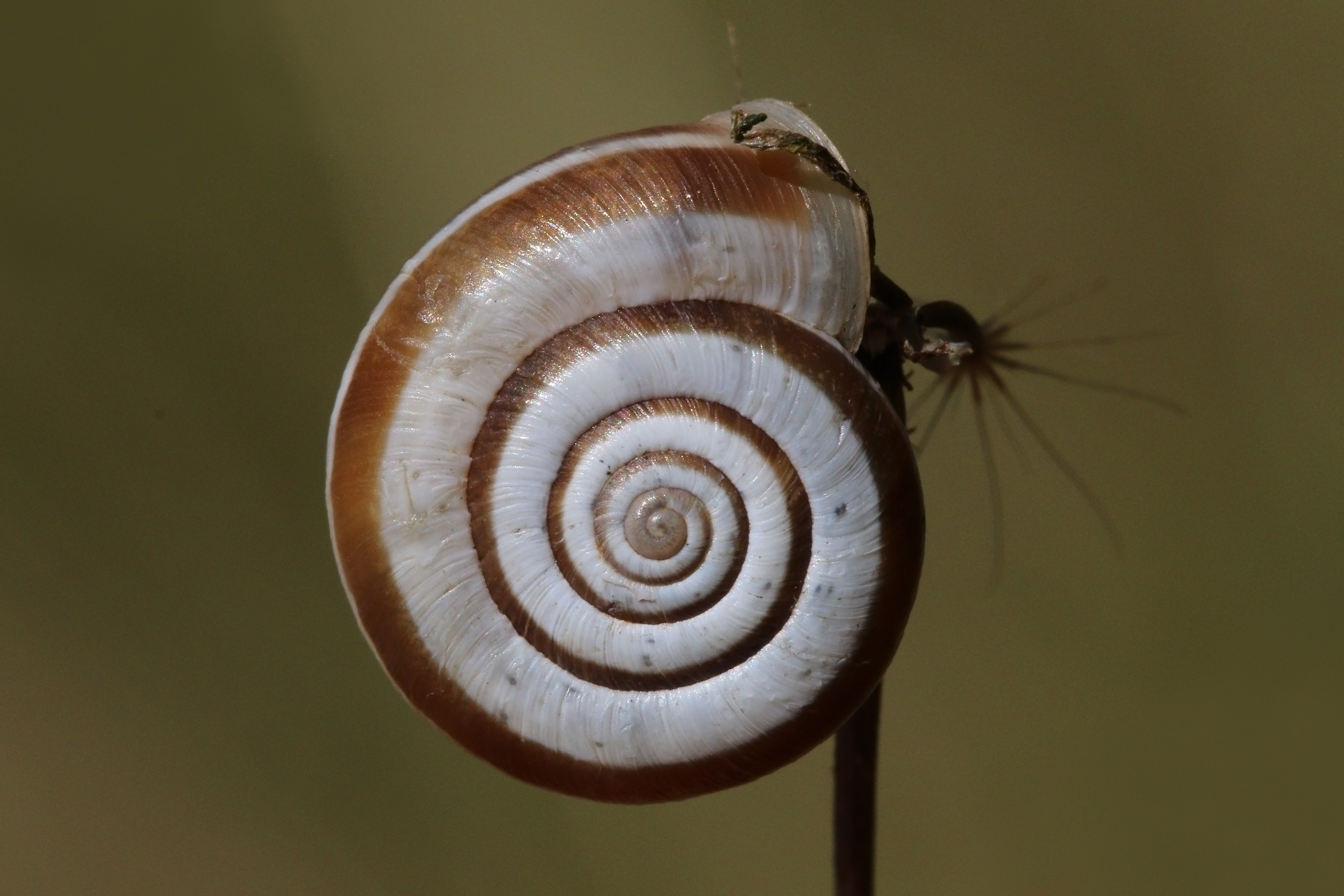
banded form, apical side

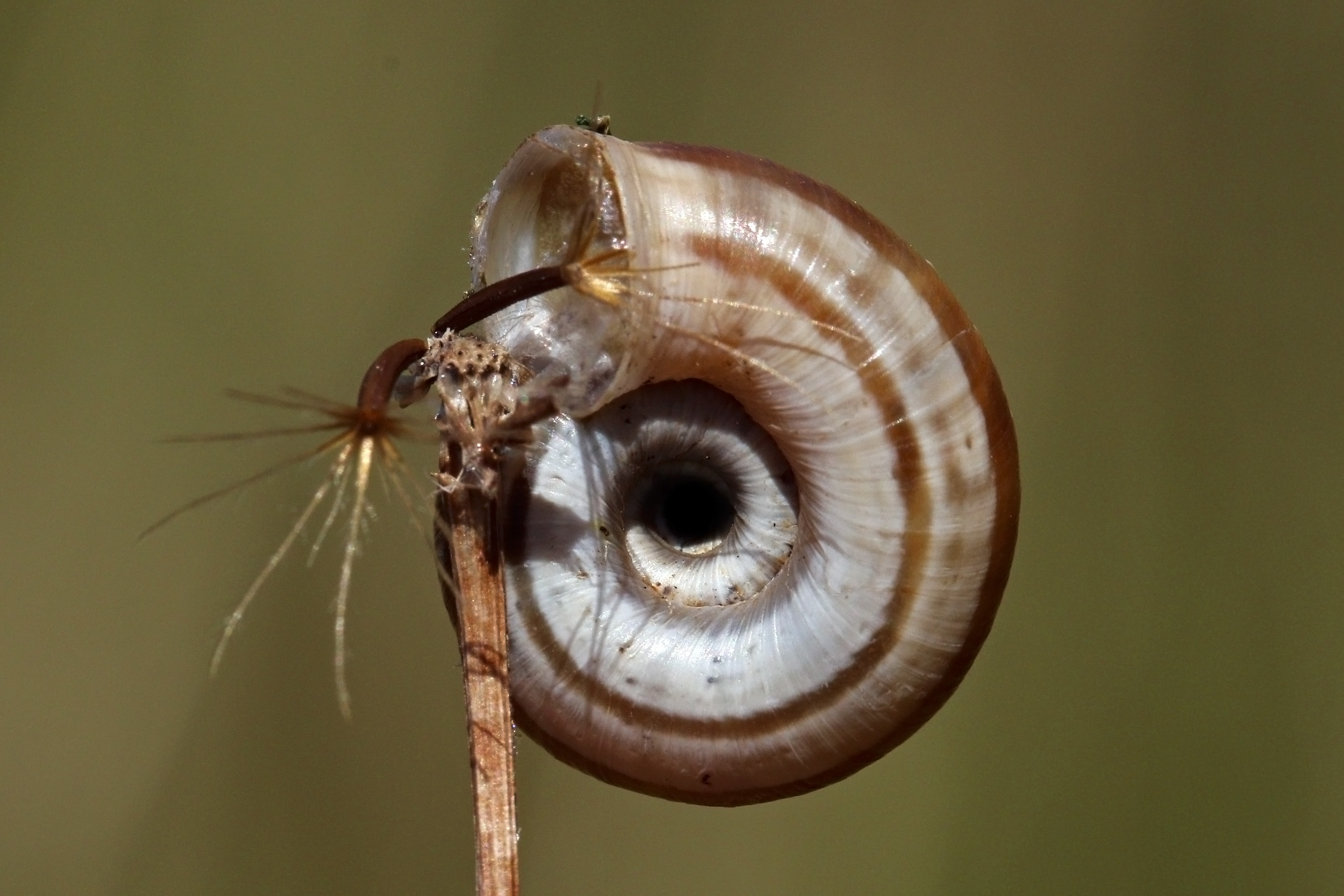
banded form, umbilical side

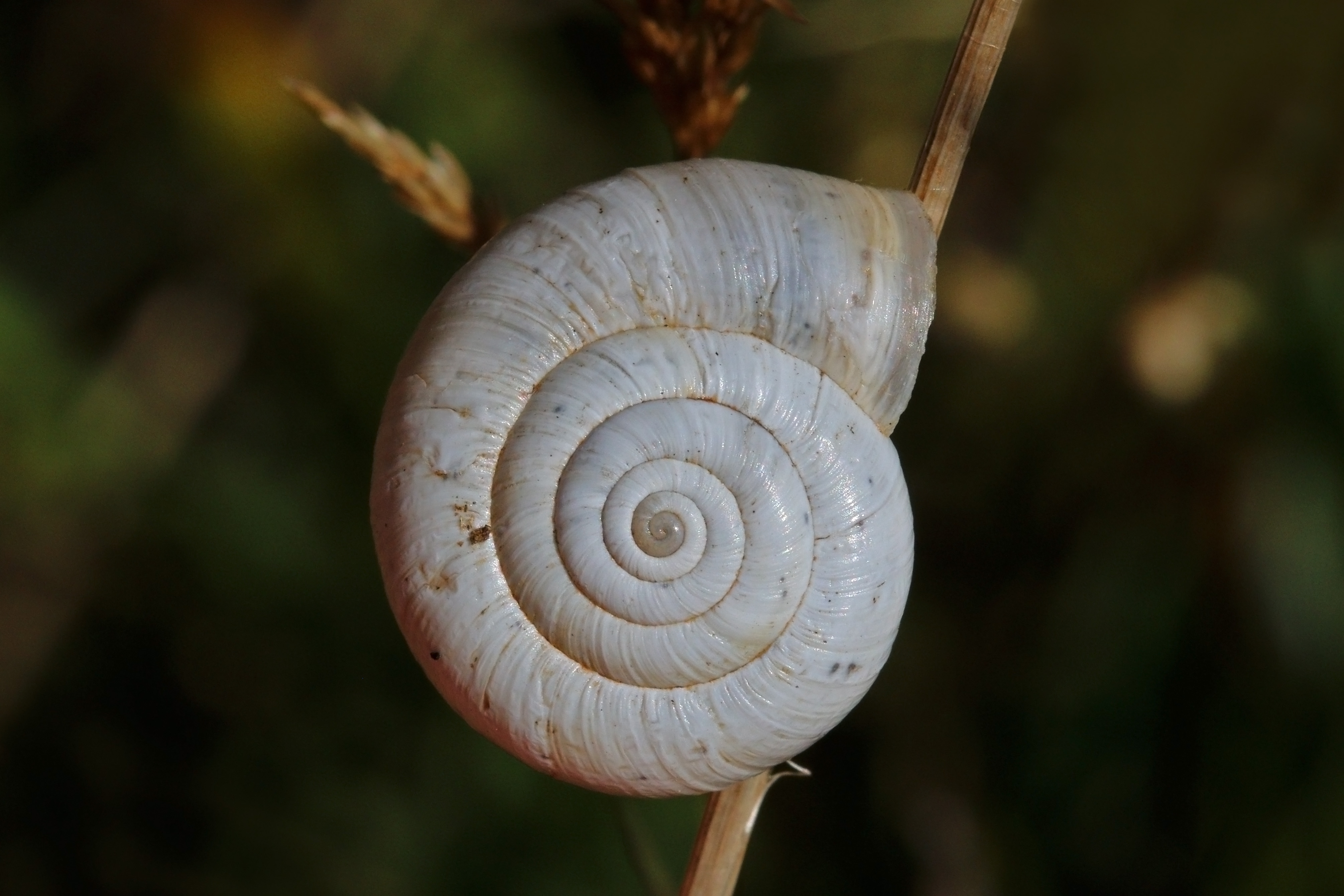
white form, apical side

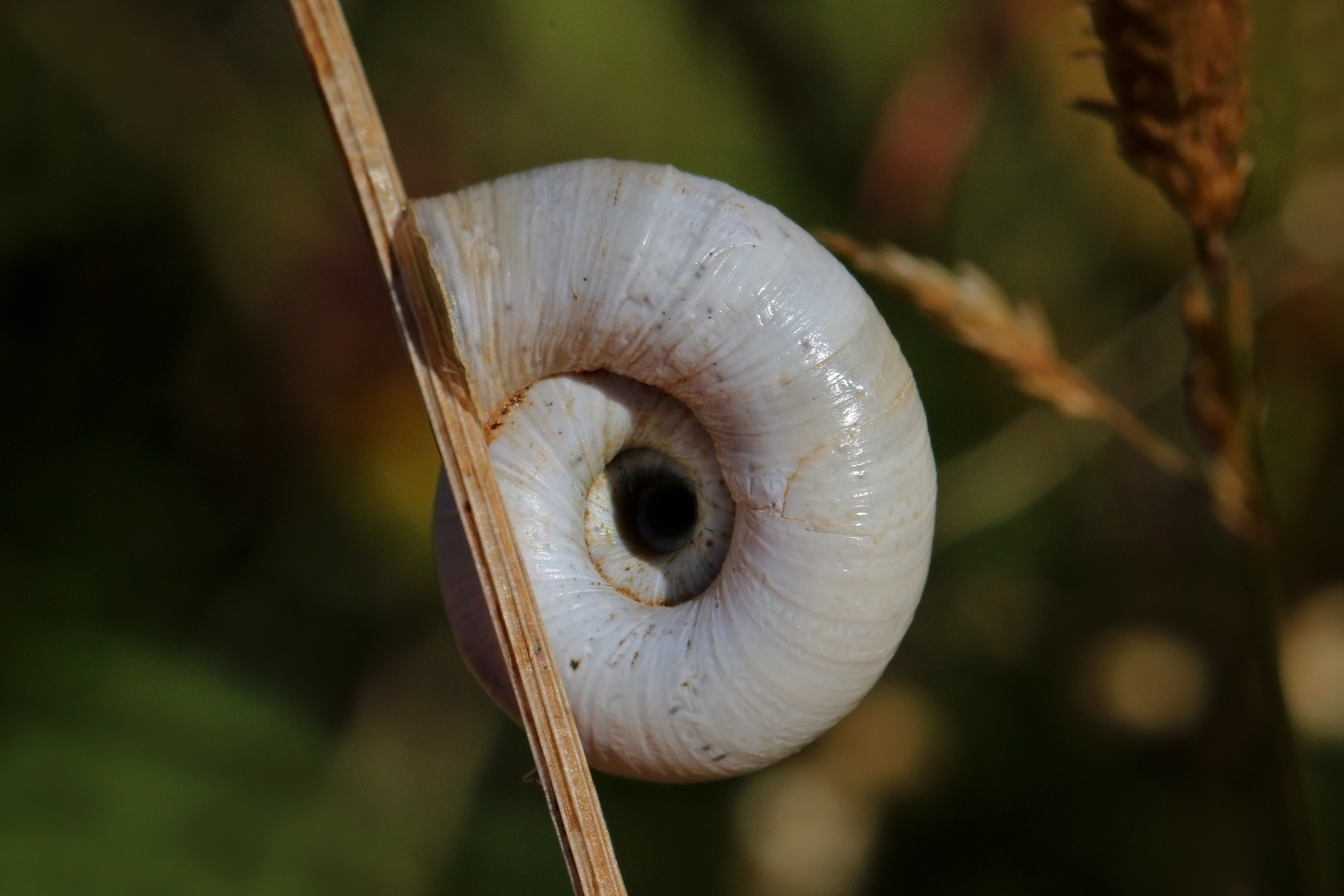
white form, umbilical side

== Distribution ==
The common heath snail is a Western Palearctic species which is found in the British Isles, France, Spain, Belgium, Netherlands, Switzerland, Denmark, Germany, Austria, Czech Republic, and Poland.

== Habitat ==
The animals live on dry, exposed habitats, such as roadsides and railway embankments, vegetated sand dunes as well as rock boulders and short grassland. They live up to 2000 m above sea level in the Alps and Pyrenees.
