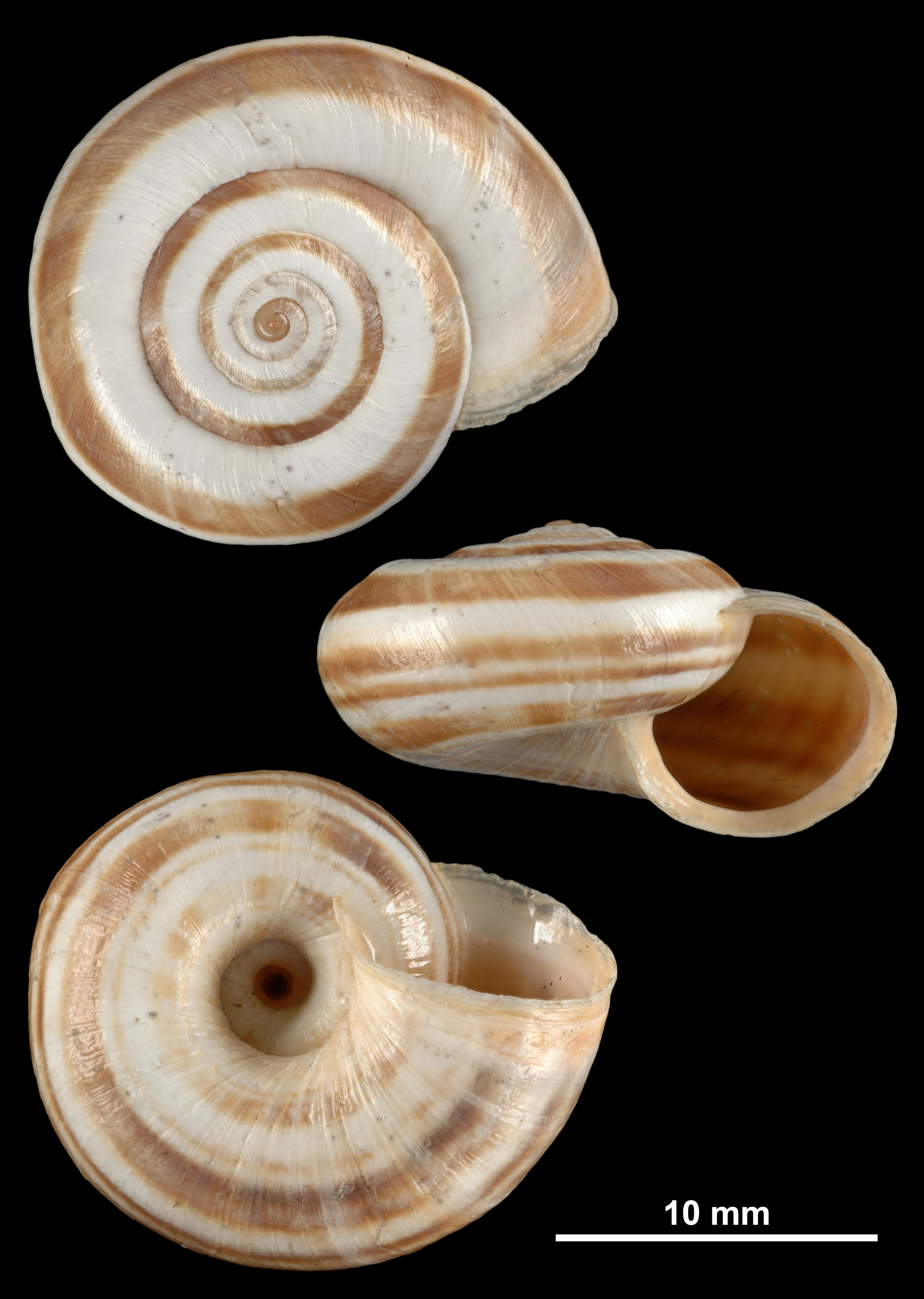

Conservation status
- Secure (NatureServe)

Scientific classification
- Kingdom: Animalia
- Phylum: Mollusca
- Class: Gastropoda
- Order: Stylommatophora
- Family: Geomitridae
- Subfamily: Helicellinae
- Tribe: Helicopsini
- Genus: Xerolenta
- Species: X. obvia

Binomial name
- Xerolenta obvia (Menke, 1828)

Synonyms
- Helicella obvia (Menke, 1828) (superseded combination); Helix obvia Menke, 1828 (original name); Helicella candicans (L. Pfeiffer, 1841) (junior synonym); Helix (Eulota) interpres Westerlund, 1879 (junior synonym); Helix (Xerophila) aberrans Mousson, 1863 (junior synonym)

= Xerolenta obvia =

Species of land snail

Xerolenta obvia is a species of air-breathing land snail, a terrestrial gastropod mollusk in the family Geomitridae.

Subspecies

- Xerolenta obvia depulsa (L. Pintér, 1969)
- Xerolenta obvia obvia (Menke, 1828)
- Xerolenta obvia pappi (Schütt, 1962)
- Xerolenta obvia razlogi (L. Pintér, 1969)

== Habitat and Distribution ==
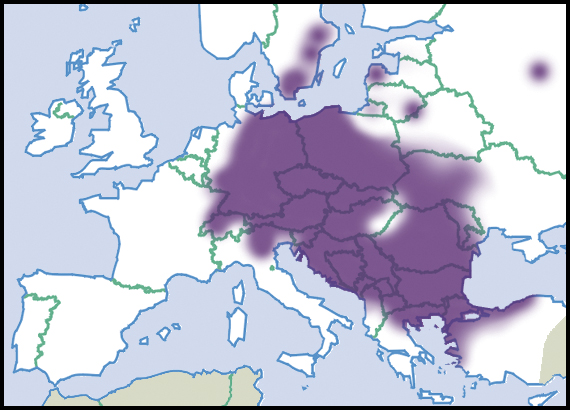
Distribution

The species is associated with dry, exposed, grassland, often in ruderal sites. It has been found up to an altitude of 2000 m in the Swiss Alps. It often occurs at very high densities.

Xerolenta obvia is supposed to be native to the Balkans and parts of eastern Europe. In the Czech Republic and Slovakia two fossil finds are from the middle Holocene (>4200 years BP) but most such occurrences are from later. The species has been introduced more widely since the end of the 19th century, so that it now occurs from Asia Minor to Spain and north to Scandinavia. It has also been introduced to Canada (Bethany, Ontario detected in 1969; at least 23 occurrences in southern Ontario as of 2015) and the USA (Wayne County, Michigan since 2001; Montana since 2012).

In the USA, this species is considered to represent a potentially serious threat as an invasive species that could negatively affect agriculture, natural ecosystems, human health or commerce. Attempts have been made to control introduced populations in the USA and Spain. It has been suggested that this species be given top national quarantine significance in the USA.

== Description and identification ==
Shells of adult Xerolenta obvia are 7–10 mm high and 14–20 mm wide, so relatively flat. Up to 5–6 whorls are present. The umbilicus is about 1/4 the width of the shell. The shells are thick and opaque, and almost smooth (with only fine, irregular striations). The shell colour is white or yellowish-white, most often decorated with quite variable, dark-brown to almost-black spiral bands. As the animals reach maturity, the body whorl scarcely descends more steeply, and no rib develops inside the aperture, but the umbilicus widens so that the centre of the spiral looks more excentricly placed.

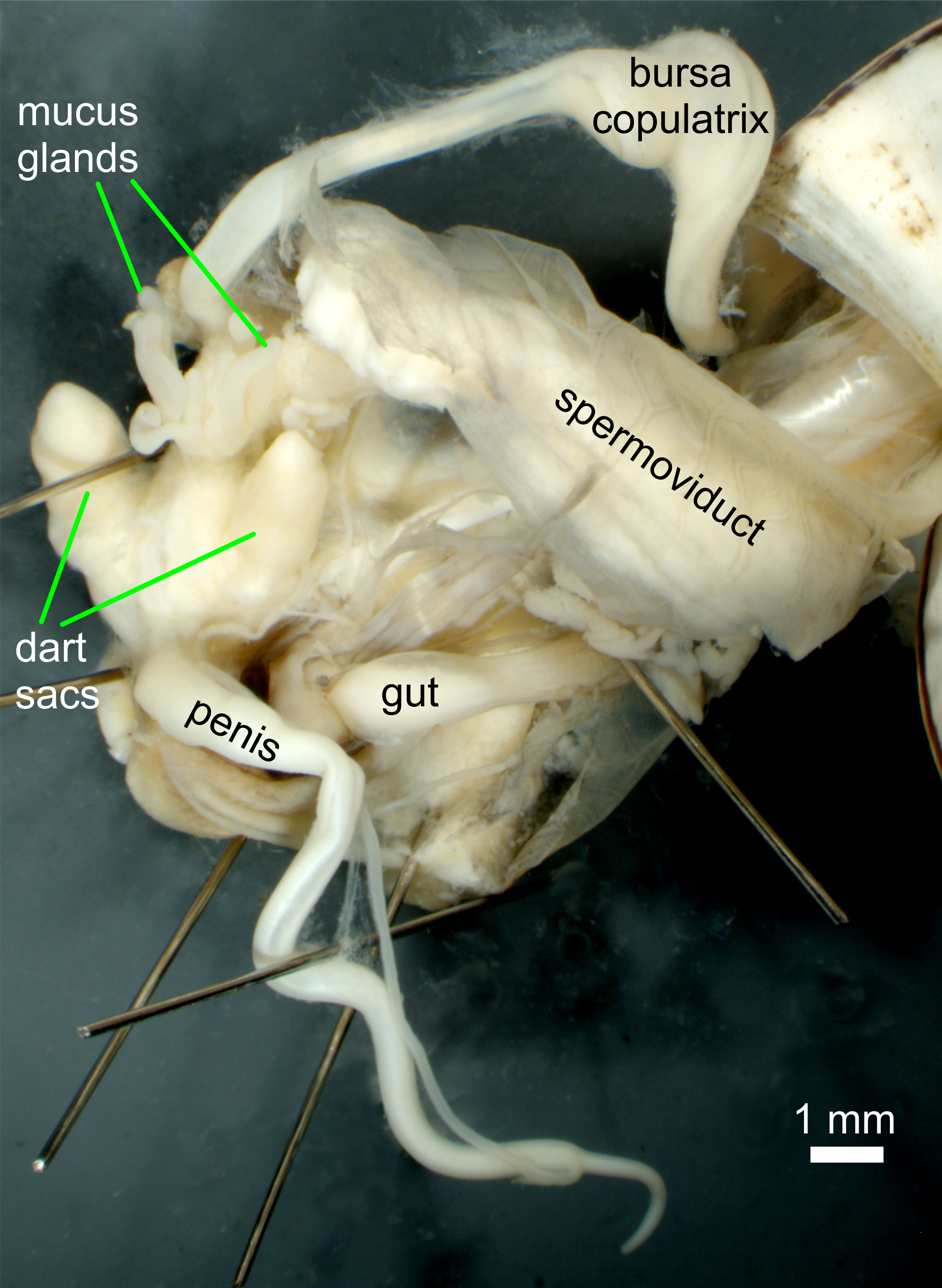
Genitalia

In Central Europe X. obvia is most likely to be confused with Cernuella neglecta and Helicella itala. The former develops a brown rip inside the aperture when it is fully grown. The latter has a somewhat wider umbilicus (about 1/3 the width of the shell) and the body whorl redirects downwards before growth ceases. The two dart sacs provide the clearest distinguishing characters. In X. obvia they are symmetrical and diverge from the vagina at their tips, which are slightly angular (cf. angels' wings). In contrast, in H. itala the sacs are longer and closely bound to the vagina; in C. neglecta the sacs lie connected over one another on one side of the vagina.

== Life history ==
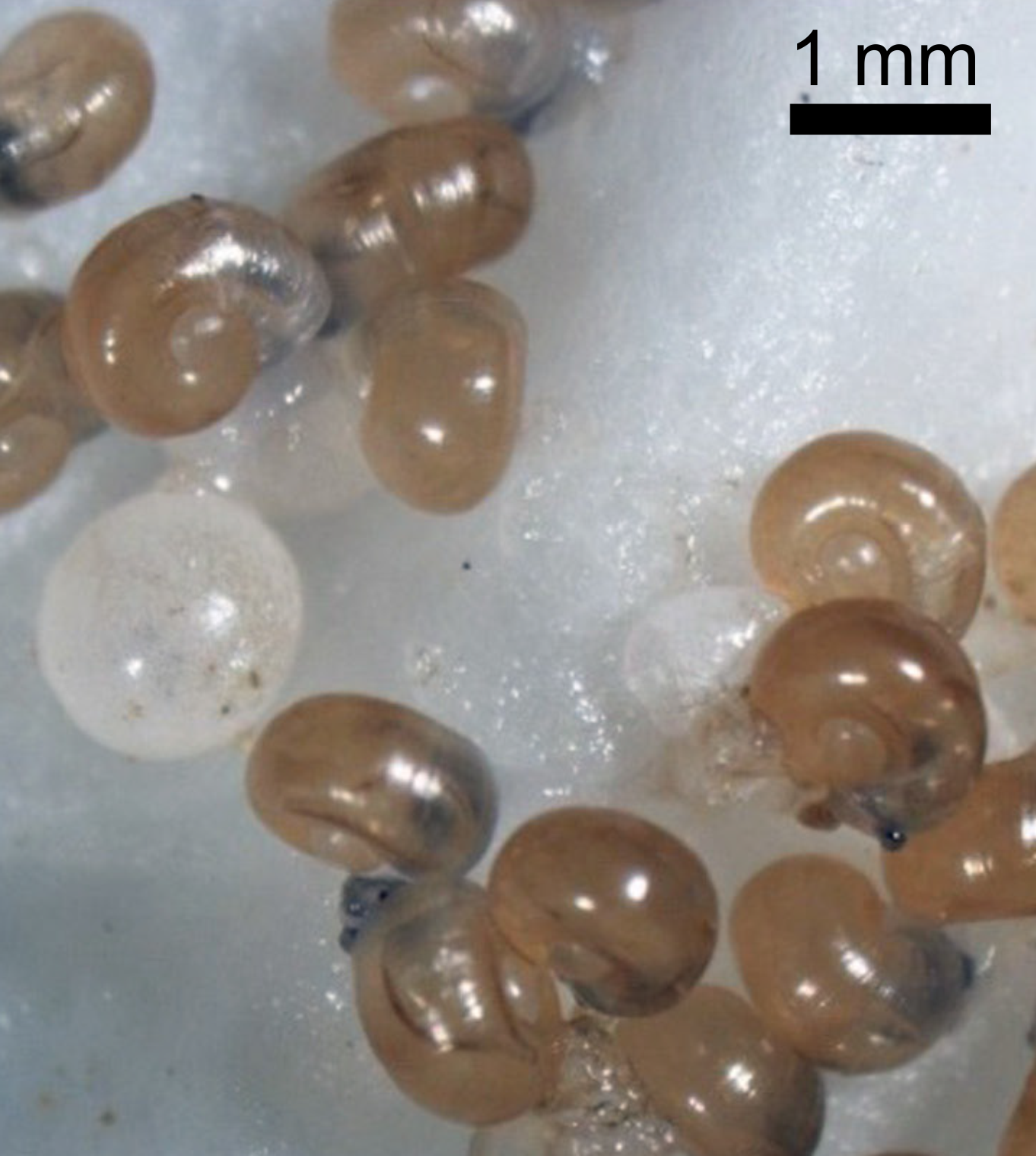
Five-day-old hatchlings, with one sterile egg; photo: E. Kuźnik-Kowalska

The ecology of this species has been studied unusually widely, including in Austria, Greece, Poland, Belarus and Montana, demonstrating considerable flexibility in life history. Whilst at some sites reproduction is restricted to autumn, at others there is evidence of it also in spring and summer. The milky-white eggs are 1.0 to 1.8 mm across; clutches are laid in the soil and their mean size varies between sites from 18 to 69 eggs. Eggs hatch within a month, sometimes within two weeks. Snails can mature within one year. At some localities snails mostly then die over winter, whereas at others they more often live for two years or even three. Snails may aestivate and/or hibernate, depending on the climate. When aestivating, they are prominent, adhering to tall shrubs.

== Gallery ==
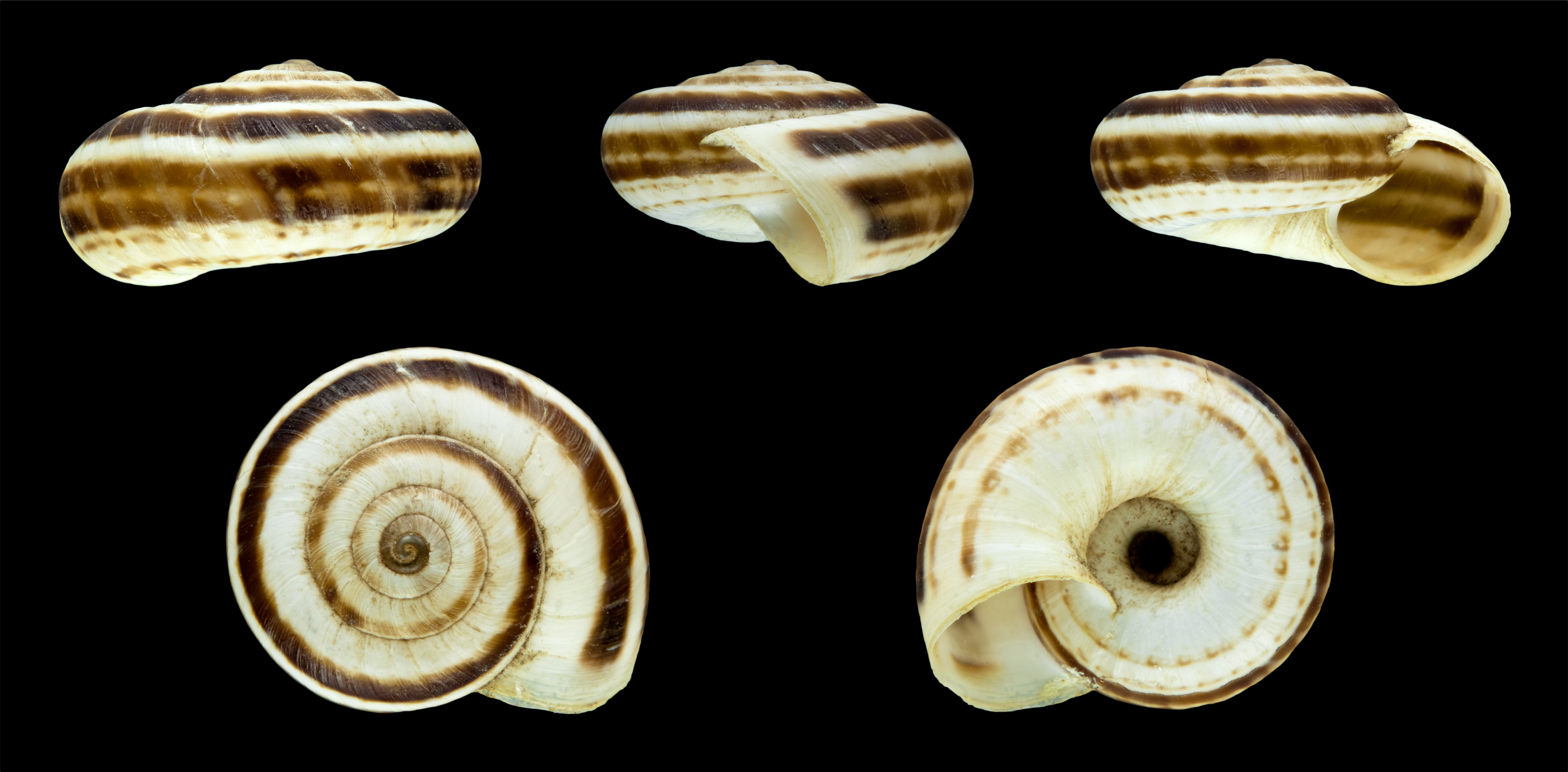
Xerolenta obvia, banded form

Xerolenta obvia, white form

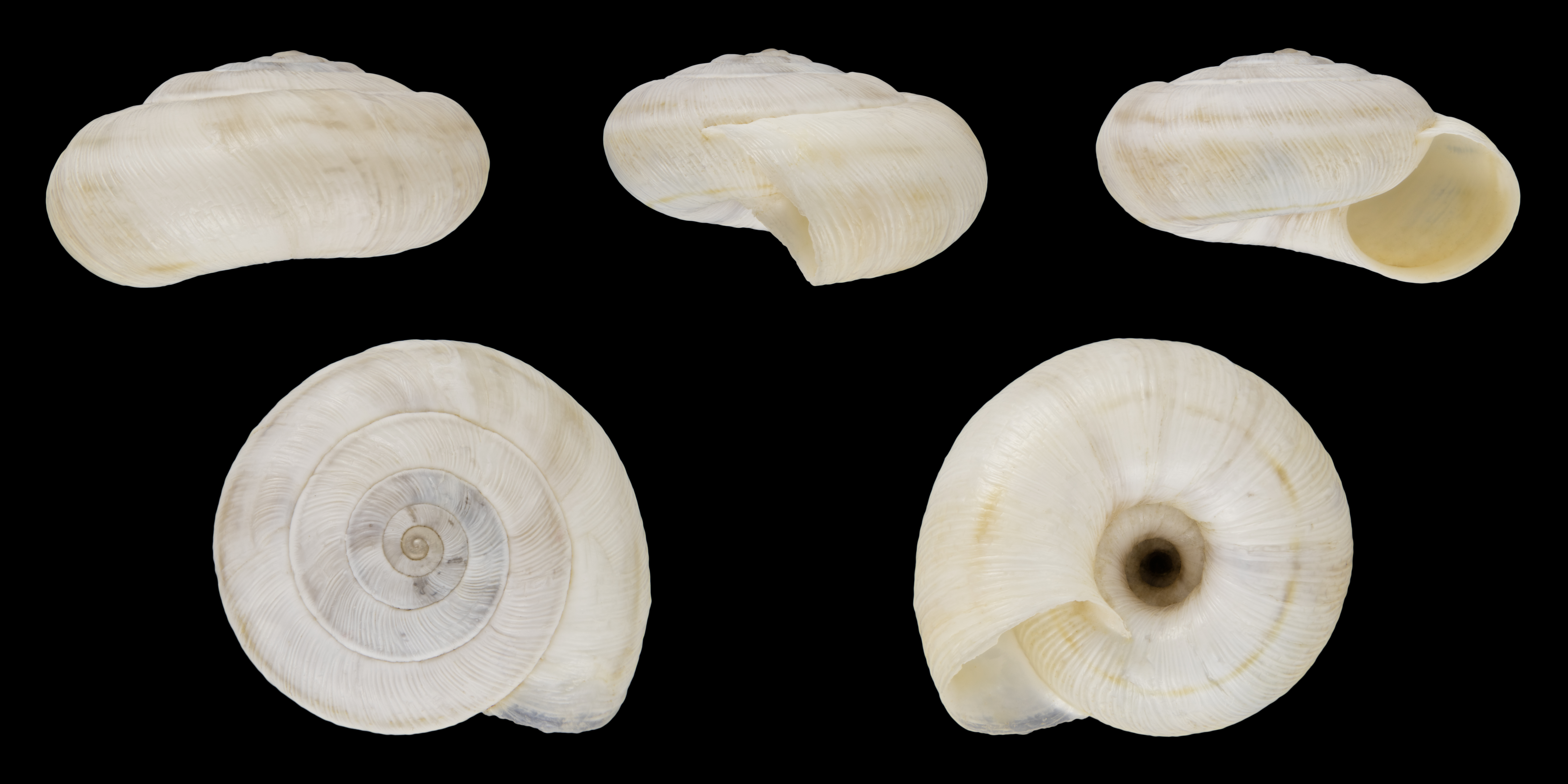
Xerolenta obvia, ribbed form

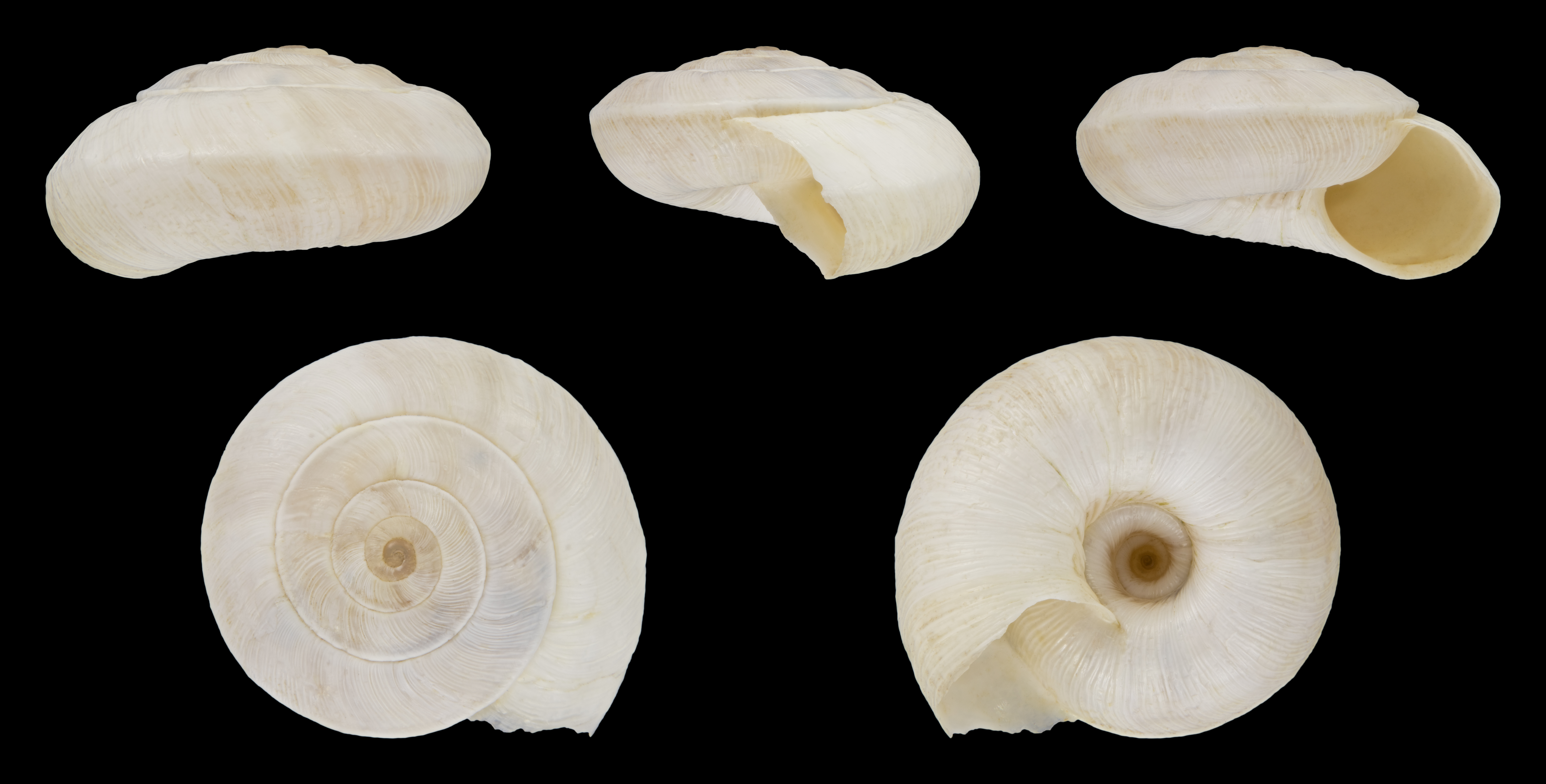
Xerolenta obvia pappi

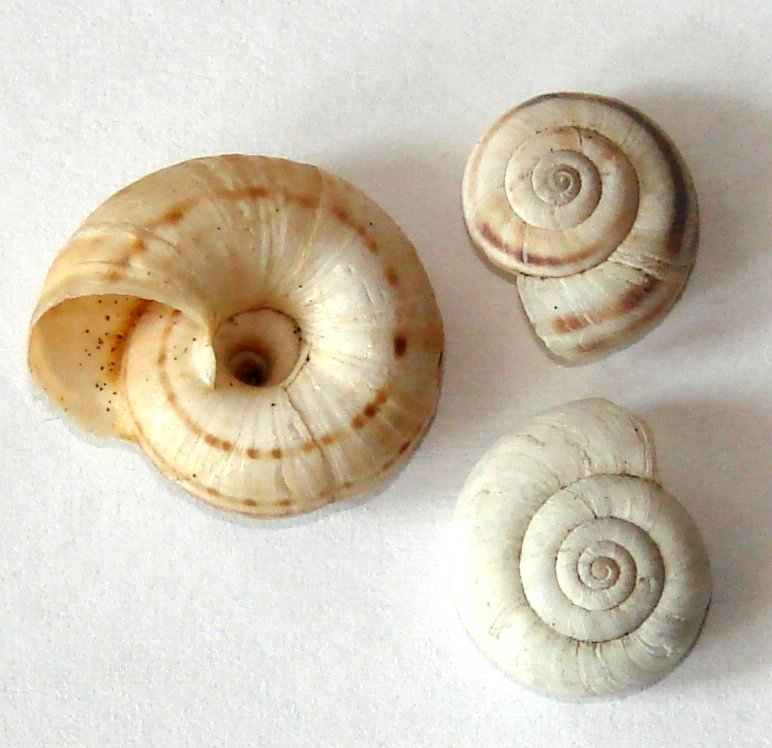
Shells of Xerolenta obvia

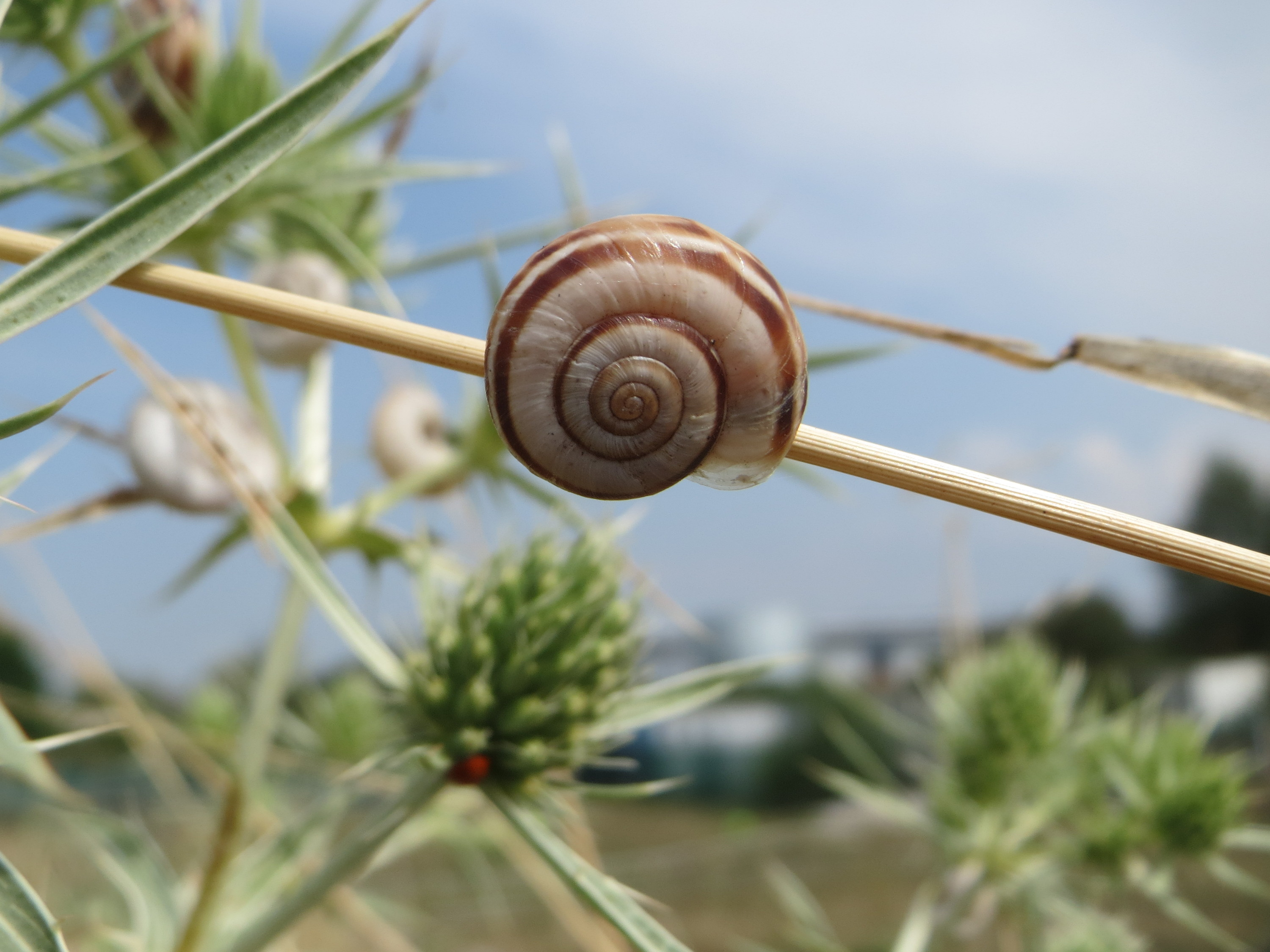
Aestivating individual

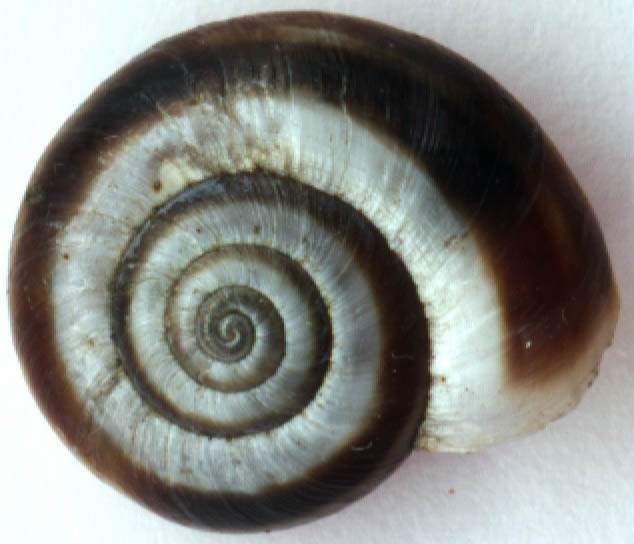
Apical view

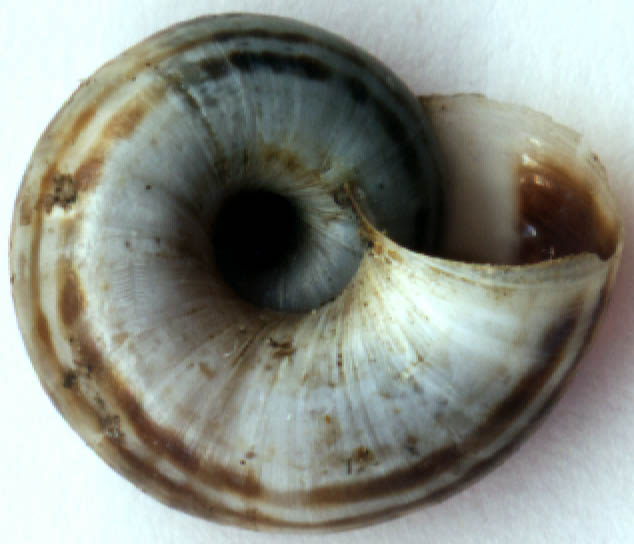
Umbilical view
