= Xerotricha corderoi =

Scientific classification
- Kingdom: Animalia
- Phylum: Mollusca
- Class: Gastropoda
- Order: Stylommatophora
- Family: Geomitridae
- Genus: Xerotricha
- Species: X. corderoi

Binomial name
- Xerotricha corderoi (Gittenberger & Manga, 1977)

Synonyms
- Helicella corderoi E. Gittenberger & Manga, 1977

Species of gastropod

Xerotricha corderoi is a species of small air-breathing land snail, a terrestrial pulmonate gastropod mollusk in the family Geomitridae.

== Distribution ==
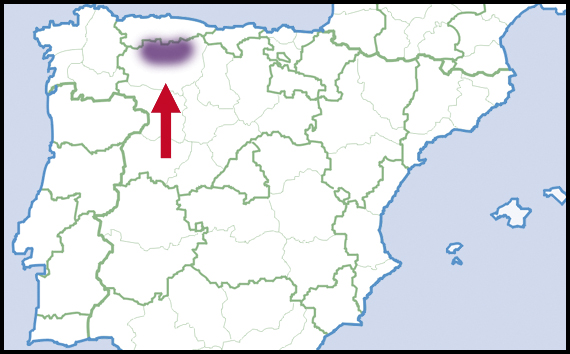
Distribution

It is endemic to mountain ranges from the Asturias and León provinces, in the north of Spain.
