= Xerotricha bierzona =

Conservation status
- Vulnerable (IUCN 3.1)

Scientific classification
- Kingdom: Animalia
- Phylum: Mollusca
- Class: Gastropoda
- Order: Stylommatophora
- Family: Geomitridae
- Genus: Xerotricha
- Species: X. bierzona

Binomial name
- Xerotricha bierzona (Gittenberger & Manga, 1977)

Synonyms
- Helicella bierzona E. Gittenberger & Manga, 1977

Species of gastropod

Xerotricha bierzona is a species of air-breathing land snail, terrestrial pulmonate gastropod mollusks in the family Geomitridae, the hairy snails and their allies.

== Distribution ==
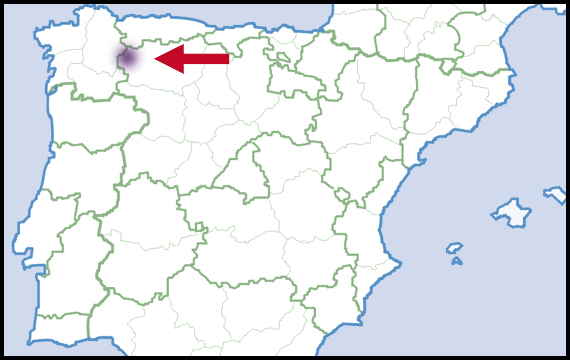
Distribution

This species is endemic to Spain.
