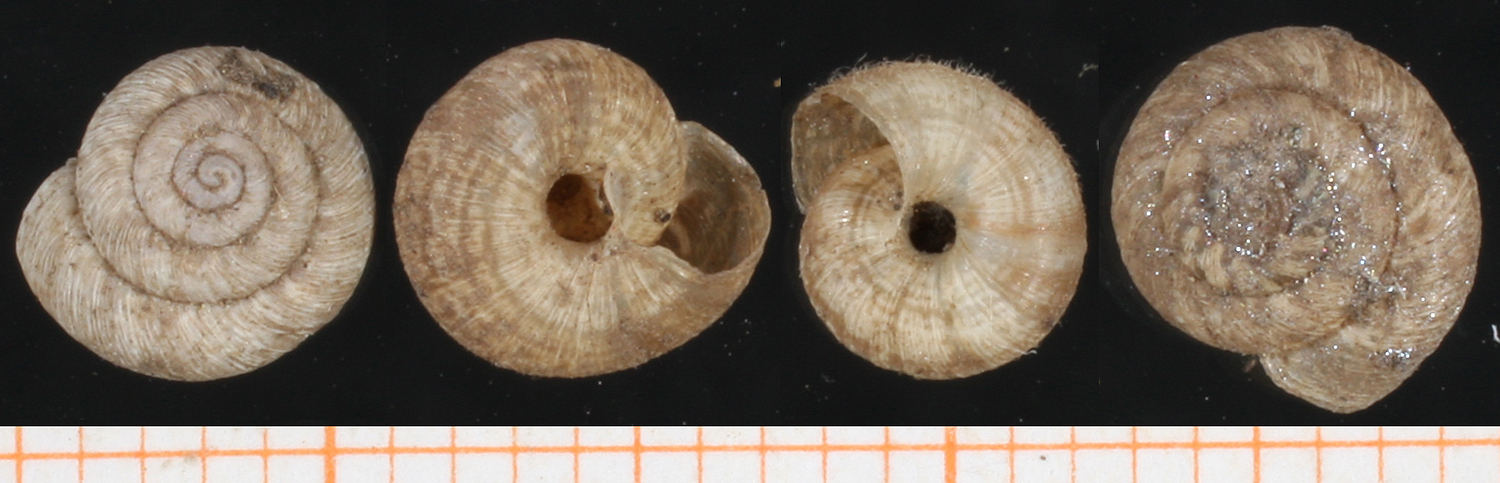
- Xerotricha conspurcata shells

Conservation status
- Apparently Secure (NatureServe)

Scientific classification
- Kingdom: Animalia
- Phylum: Mollusca
- Class: Gastropoda
- Order: Stylommatophora
- Family: Geomitridae
- Genus: Xerotricha
- Species: X. conspurcata

Binomial name
- Xerotricha conspurcata (Draparnaud, 1801)

Synonyms
- Helicella (Xerotricha) conspurcata (Draparnaud, 1801) ·; Helicella mariae Gasull, 1974; Helix (Xerophila) conspurcata Draparnaud, 1801 (superseded combination); Helix (Xerotricha) conspurcata Draparnaud, 1801; Helix aetnaea Benoit, 1857 ·(junior synonym); Helix conspurcata Draparnaud, 1801 (original combination); Helix cupaniana Calcara, 1842 ·(junior synonym); Helix cupanii Calcara, 1842 (junior synonym); Helix dumivaga Morelet, 1880 (junior synonym); Helix moricola Paladilhe, 1875 (junior synonym); Xerotricha mariae (Gasull, 1972)

= Xerotricha conspurcata =

Species of gastropod

Xerotricha conspurcata is a species of small air-breathing land snail, a terrestrial pulmonate gastropod mollusk in the family Geomitridae.

== Description ==
Xerotricha conspurcata grows up to 4.5 x 6.8 mm in size. It has a striated mottled brown shell marked with short hairs. This species makes and uses love darts as part of mating behavior.

== Distribution ==
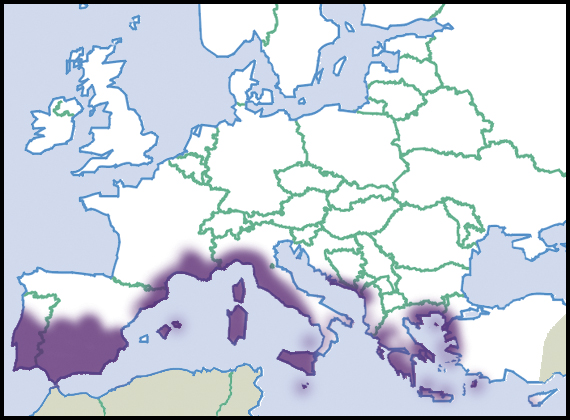
Distribution

This snail is native to the Mediterranean region of Europe. It has been recorded in the United States in California and Washington as an introduced species.
