= Xerotricha zujarensis =

Conservation status
- Data Deficient (IUCN 3.1)

Scientific classification
- Kingdom: Animalia
- Phylum: Mollusca
- Class: Gastropoda
- Order: Stylommatophora
- Family: Geomitridae
- Genus: Xerotricha
- Species: X. zujarensis

Binomial name
- Xerotricha zujarensis (Ortiz de Zarate, 1950)

Synonyms
- Helicella zujarensis Ortiz de Zarate, 1950

Species of gastropod

Xerotricha zujarensis is a species of air-breathing land snail, terrestrial pulmonate gastropod mollusks in the family Geomitridae, the hairy snails and their allies.

== Distribution ==
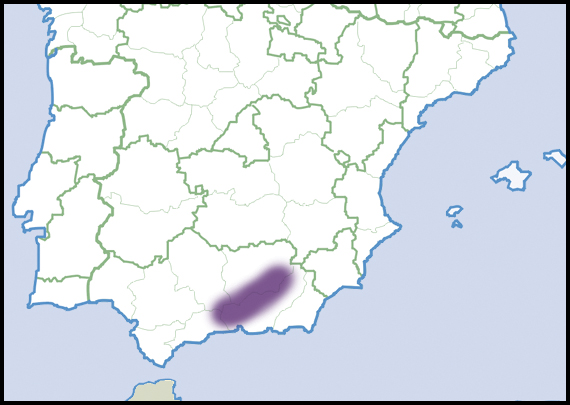
Distribution

This species is endemic to Spain.
