= Xerotricha zaratei =

Conservation status
- Near Threatened (IUCN 3.1)

Scientific classification
- Kingdom: Animalia
- Phylum: Mollusca
- Class: Gastropoda
- Order: Stylommatophora
- Family: Geomitridae
- Genus: Xerotricha
- Species: X. zaratei

Binomial name
- Xerotricha zaratei (Gittenberger & Manga, 1977)

Synonyms
- Helicella zaratei Gittenberger & Manga, 1977

Species of gastropod

Xerotricha zaratei is a species of air-breathing land snail, terrestrial pulmonate gastropod mollusks in the family Geomitridae, the hairy snails and their allies.

== Distribution ==
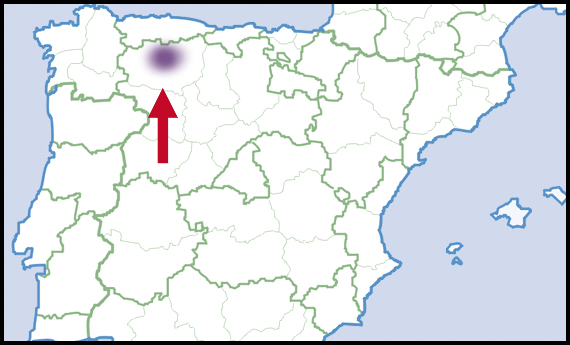
Distribution

This species is endemic to Spain.
