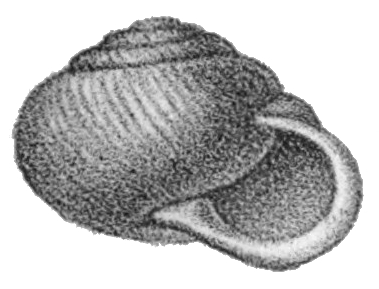
- Drawing of shell of Klikia osculum

Scientific classification
- Kingdom: Animalia
- Phylum: Mollusca
- Class: Gastropoda
- Order: Stylommatophora
- Family: Elonidae
- Genus: †Klikia; Pilsbry, 1895

= Klikia =

Genus of gastropods

Klikia is a genus of fossil air-breathing land snails, a terrestrial pulmonate gastropod molluscs in the family Elonidae.

This genus is named after Bohumil Klika (1868-1942, also known as Gottlieb Klika), the author of the 1891 book Die tertiaeren Land- und Süsswasser-Conchylien des nord-westlichen Böhmen.

== Original description ==
The genus Klikia was originally described by Henry Augustus Pilsbry in 1895.

Pilsbry's original text (the type description) reads as follows:

Section Klikia Pilsbry, 1894.

Shell depressed-globose, narrowly umbilical, with convex, obtuse spire and round periphery. Surface costulate-striate and minutely papillae in regular diamond pattern. Last whorl constricted behind the lip, which is well reflexed and thickened. Type H. osculum Thomae, pl. 71, fig. 49.

This apparently extinct type of Helicodonta is characteristic of middle European Miocene, where it coexisted -with species of Caracollina, such as phacodes Thomae, and with species of typical Helicodonta; H. involuta Thomae being allied to the recent angigyra and biconcava. The strong differentiation of these sectional groups at as early a period as the lower Miocene (when they were, in fact, as strongly differentiated as in the recent fauna), argues a vastly greater antiquity for the genus as a whole. This group is named in honor of Gottlieb Klika, author of an excellent memoir upon tertiary

land and fresh-water shells of Bohemia.
