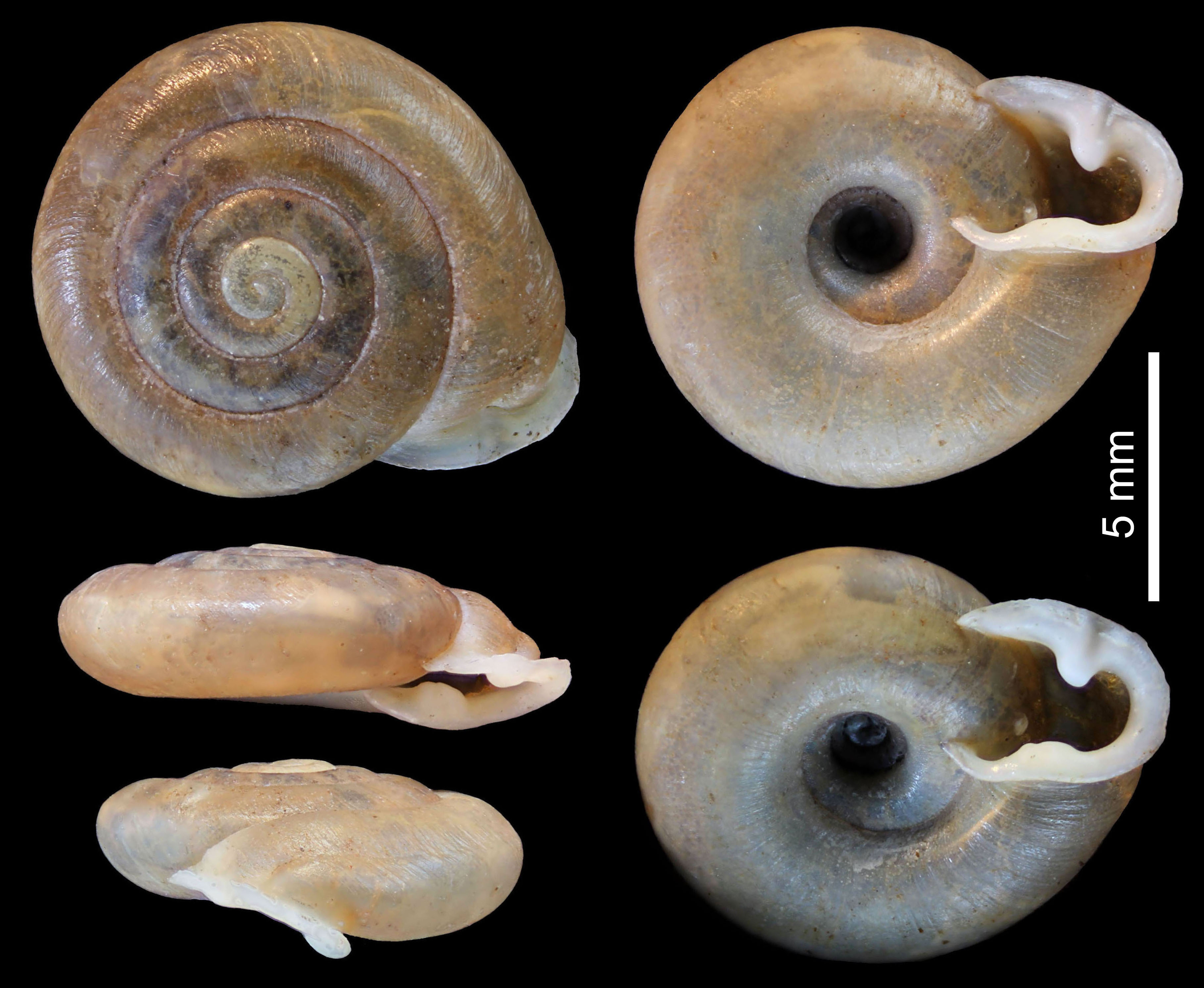

Scientific classification
- Kingdom: Animalia
- Phylum: Mollusca
- Class: Gastropoda
- Order: Stylommatophora
- Family: Helicodontidae
- Genus: Soosia
- Species: S. diodonta

Binomial name
- Soosia diodonta (Férussac, 1821)

= Soosia diodonta =

Species of gastropod

Soosia diodonta is a species of air-breathing land snail, a terrestrial pulmonate gastropod mollusk in the family Helicodontidae.

== Distribution ==
The distribution of Soosia diodonta includes south-eastern Europe:

- Eastern Serbia
- Western Romania
- Bulgaria
