= Falkneria camerani =

Conservation status
- Vulnerable (IUCN 3.1)

Scientific classification
- Kingdom: Animalia
- Phylum: Mollusca
- Class: Gastropoda
- Order: Stylommatophora
- Family: Helicodontidae
- Genus: Falkneria
- Species: F. camerani

Binomial name
- Falkneria camerani (Lessona, 1880)

Synonyms
- Helix camerani Lessona, 1880

Species of gastropod

Falkneria camerani is a species of land snail in the family Helicodontidae.

This species is endemic to northwestern Italy. It is only known from five locations in Aosta Valley, Cervo Valley, Valsesia and Sessera Valley. Its natural habitat is rocky areas. It is threatened by habitat loss and, possibly, acid precipitation.

This taxon was incorrectly listed by Giusti & Manganelli in 1990 as "Falkneri camerani", due to an orthographic error.
