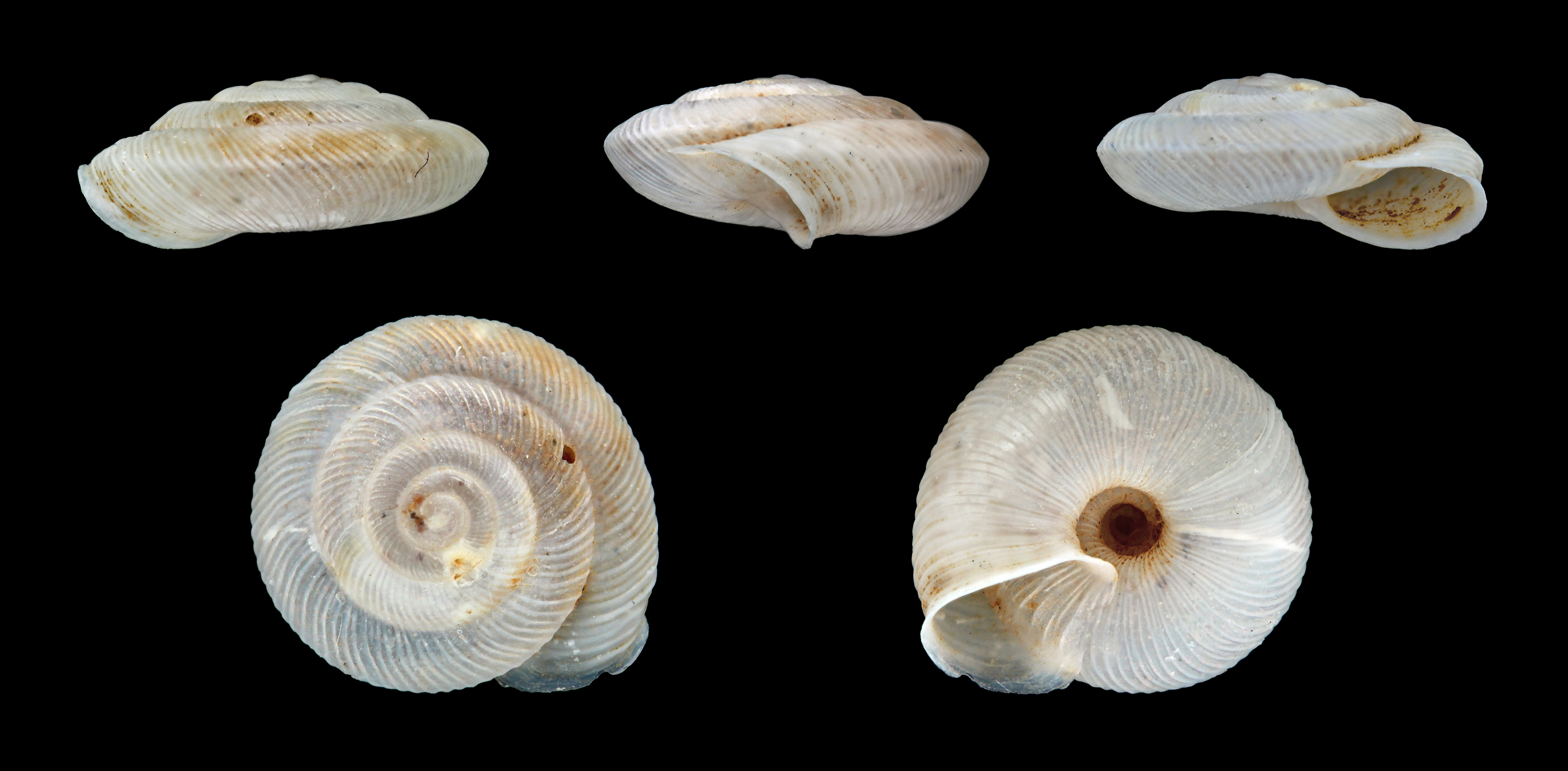

Scientific classification
- Kingdom: Animalia
- Phylum: Mollusca
- Class: Gastropoda
- Order: Stylommatophora
- Family: Trissexodontidae
- Genus: Caracollina
- Species: C. lenticula

Binomial name
- Caracollina lenticula (Michaud, 1831)

= Caracollina lenticula =

Species of gastropod

Caracollina lenticula is a species of gastropods belonging to the family Trissexodontidae. It is more commonly known as the lens snail.

== Habitat ==
The species is found in Mediterranean. It is known to live under rocks, and can be found on walls, between plants, and on behind dunes around dry costal area. They can be found around human habitation and more urban areas, due to the fact that they can spread via the transportation of goods.

== Identification ==
The lens snail's shell is found to be flat and lenticular. They are a lightly colored gray, with a reddish brown shell. It has large antennas with black eyes. During movement, the shell of the snail twists sideways to the right, making it flat, unlike most gastropods. They can grow up to 3 to 7 mm long.
