= Suboestophora altamirai =

Conservation status
- Vulnerable (IUCN 3.1)

Scientific classification
- Kingdom: Animalia
- Phylum: Mollusca
- Class: Gastropoda
- Order: Stylommatophora
- Family: Trissexodontidae
- Genus: Suboestophora
- Species: S. altamirai

Binomial name
- Suboestophora altamirai Ortiz de Zarate, 1962

Species of gastropod

Suboestophora altamirai is a species of air-breathing land snail, a terrestrial pulmonate gastropod mollusk in the family Trissexodontidae, within the Helicoidea.

This species is endemic to Spain.
