= Atenia quadrasi =

Conservation status
- Least Concern (IUCN 3.1)

Scientific classification
- Kingdom: Animalia
- Phylum: Mollusca
- Class: Gastropoda
- Order: Stylommatophora
- Family: Helicodontidae
- Genus: Atenia
- Species: A. quadrasi

Binomial name
- Atenia quadrasi Hidalgo, 1885

Synonyms
- Helix quadrasi Hidalgo, 1885

Species of gastropod

Atenia quadrasi is a species of air-breathing land snail, terrestrial pulmonate gastropod mollusks in the family Helicodontidae.

This species is endemic to Spain.
