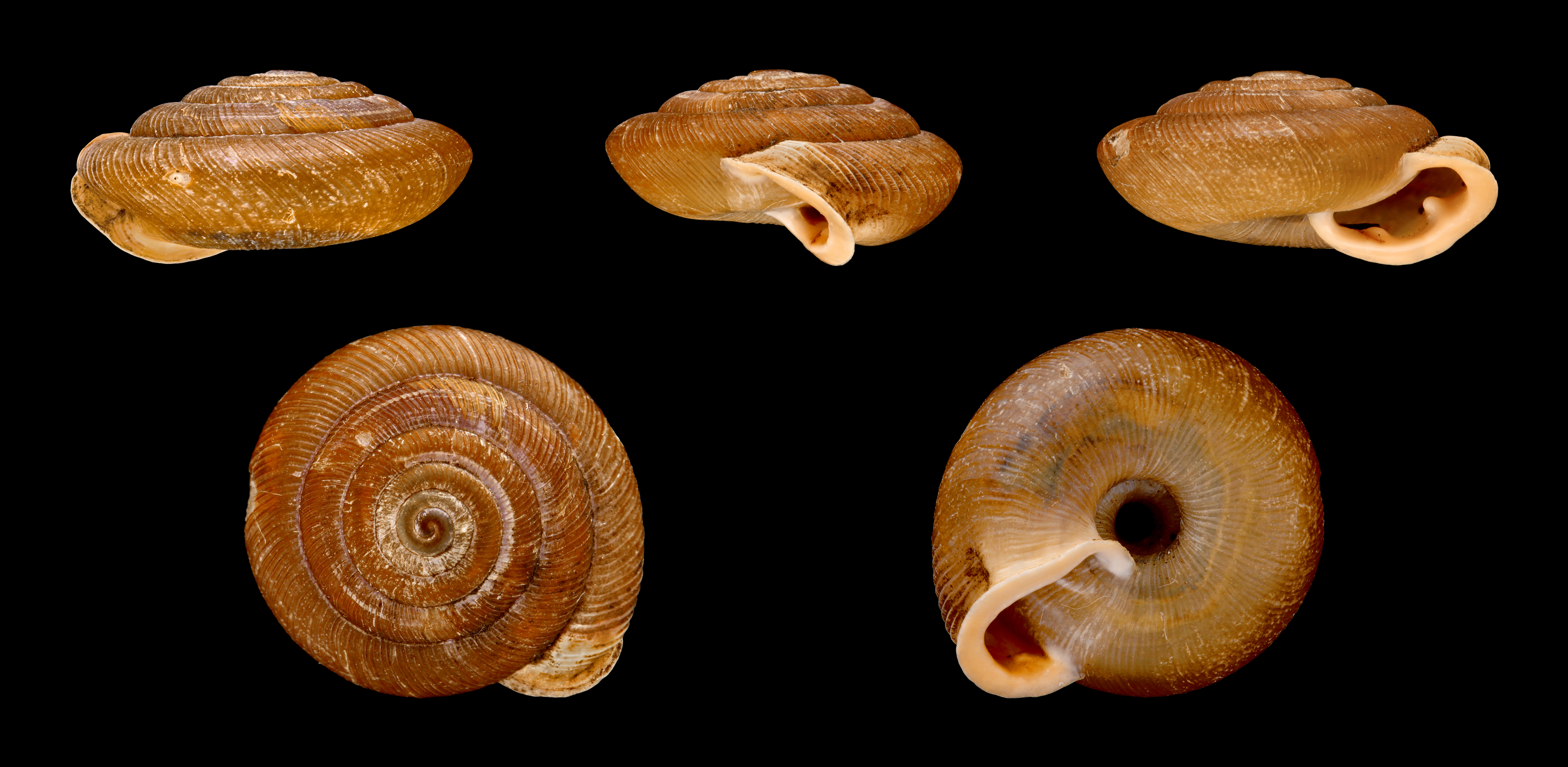
- Oestophora barbula (Rossmässler, 1838)

Scientific classification
- Kingdom: Animalia
- Phylum: Mollusca
- Class: Gastropoda
- Order: Stylommatophora
- Family: Trissexodontidae
- Genus: Oestophora; Hesse, 1907

Diversity
- about 10 species

= Oestophora =

Genus of gastropods

Oestophora is a genus of air-breathing land snail, a terrestrial gastropod mollusk in the family Trissexodontidae.

== Distribution ==
The distribution of the genus Oestophora includes western Iberian Peninsula, north Africa and the Azores.

== Description ==
The shell is ribbed, with rounded or keeled whorls. The apertural margin is reflected and thickened.

=== Reproductive system ===
There is no flagellum, or penial papilla. There is one small dart sac, one longer accessory sac separated from vaginal walls and a vagina with three simple and long accessory (mucous) glands.

The number of haploid chromosomes is 30.

== Species ==
Species within the genus Oestophoa include:

- Oestophora barbula (Rossmässler, 1838)
- Oestophora barrelsi (Hovestadt & Ripken, 2015)
- Oestophora calpeana (Morelet, 1854)
- Oestophora dorotheae Hesse, 1930
- Oestophora granesae Arrébola Burgos, 1998
- Oestophora lusitanica (Pfeiffer, 1841) - type species
- Oestophora ortizi Winter & Ripken, 1991
- Oestophora silvae Ortiz de Zárate López, 1962
- Oestophora tarnieri (Morelet, 1854)

Synonyms:

- Oestophora turriplana is a synonym for Gittenbergeria turriplana (Morelet, 1845)
