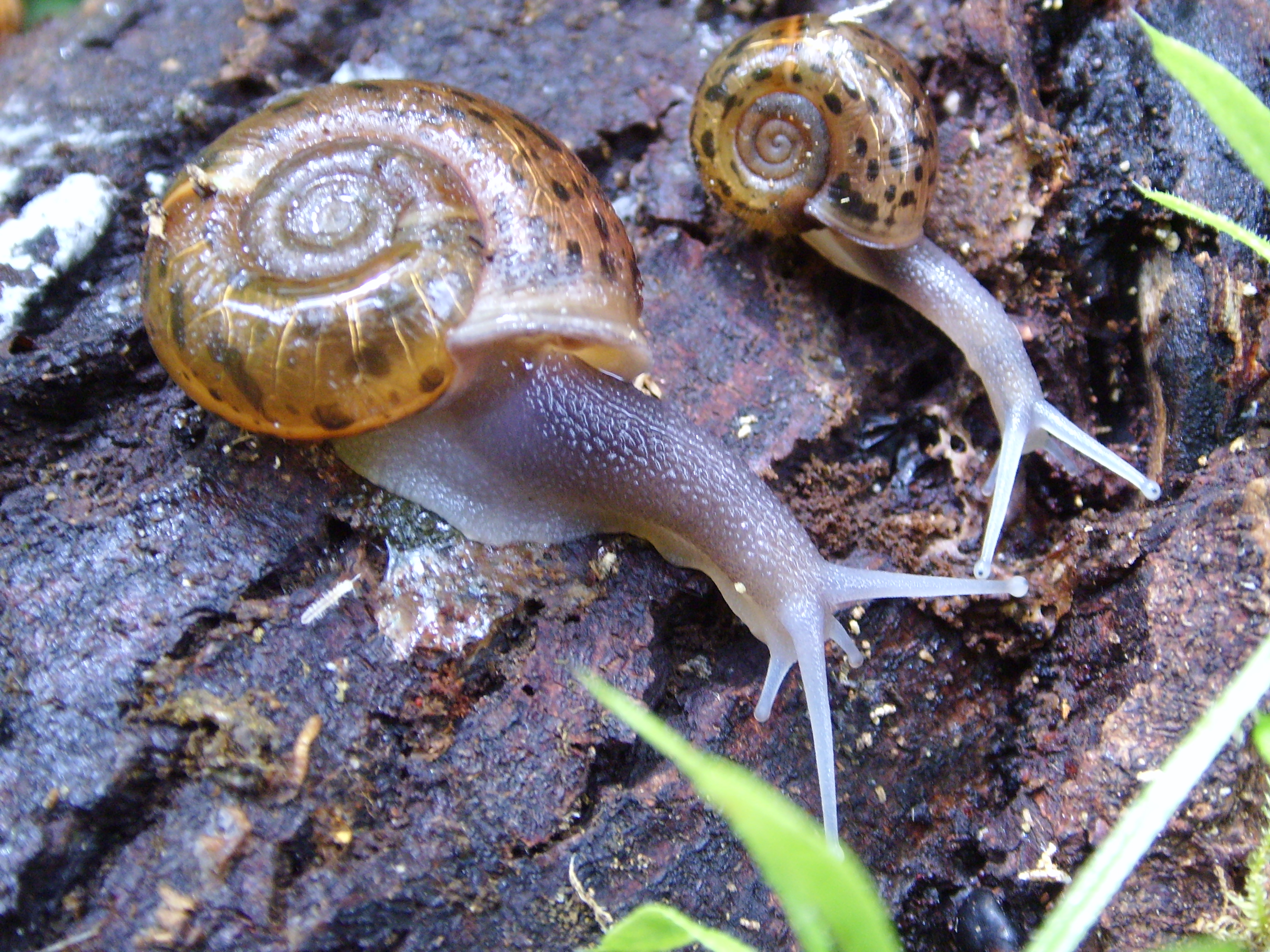

Conservation status
- Least Concern (IUCN 3.1)

Scientific classification
- Kingdom: Animalia
- Phylum: Mollusca
- Class: Gastropoda
- Order: Stylommatophora
- Family: Elonidae
- Subfamily: Eloninae
- Genus: Elona; H. Adams & A. Adams, 1855
- Species: E. quimperiana

Binomial name
- Elona quimperiana (Férussac, 1821)
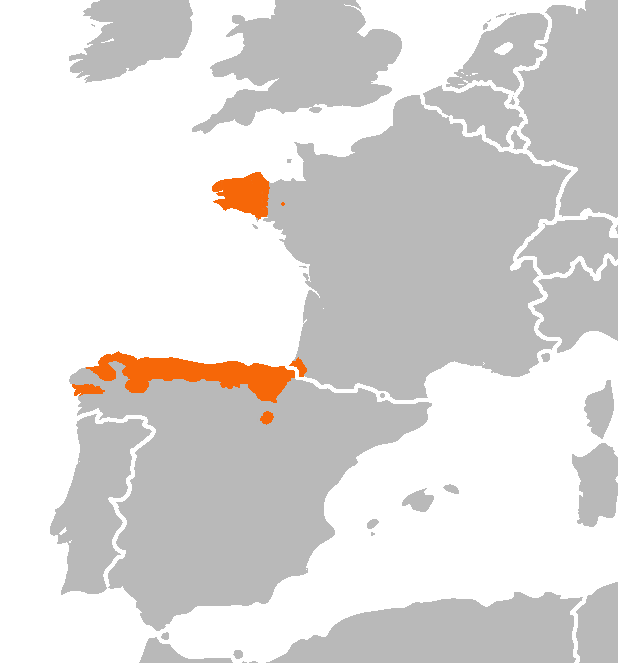

Synonyms
- Helix quimperiana Férussac, 1821

= Escargot de Quimper =

Species of gastropod

Elona quimperiana, common name the escargot de Quimper ("Quimper snail"), is a species of air-breathing land snail, a terrestrial pulmonate gastropod mollusk in the family Elonidae.

Elona is a monotypic genus, i.e. it contains only one species, Elona quimperiana. The specific name comes from the city of Quimper in Brittany, France.

This snail is mentioned in annexes II and IV of the Habitats Directive.

== Original description ==
Elona quimperiana was originally described (under the name Helix quimperiana) by André Étienne d'Audebert de Férussac in 1821.

Férussac's original text (the type description) reads in the French language as follows:

QUIMPERINA, nobis. pl. fig.

α) Nobis. pl. LXXVI (par erreur LXVI), fig. 2.

Habit. Les bords de Briec l'Odet, près Quimper en Bretagne. Elle a été découverte par M^{rs} De Kermovan et Bonnemaison; Comm. Desmarest.

Which means in English:

"Habitat: Margin of Briec-de-l'Odet, near Quimper in Brittany. It was found by Messieurs De Kermovan and Bonnemaison."

== Shell description ==
The shell is umbilicate and planorboid in shape. The spire is slightly concave. The periphery is broadly rounded, corneous with a few varicoid white stripes. The shell has five or six whorls.

The aperture is lunar and slightly oblique. The lip is white, expanded above, reflexed below, with the ends distant.

The width of the shell is 20–30 mm. The height of the shell is 10–12 mm.

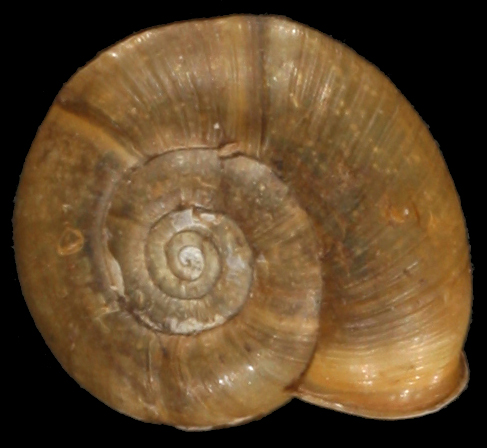
apical view

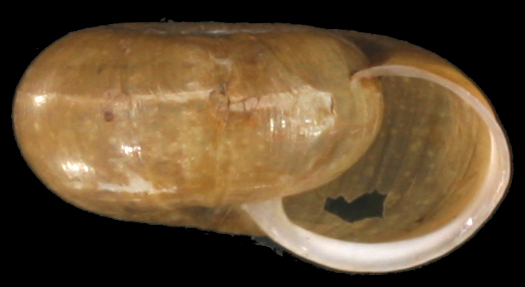
apertural view

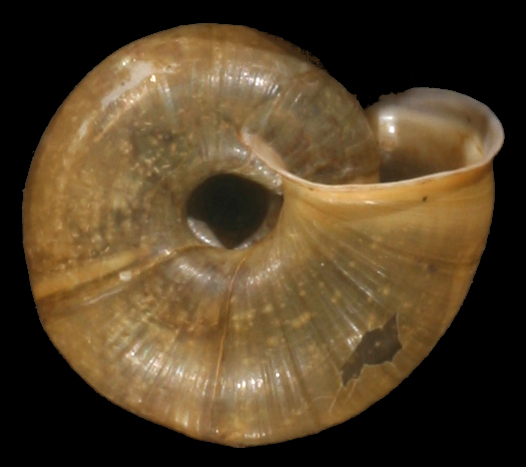
umbilical view

== Anatomy ==
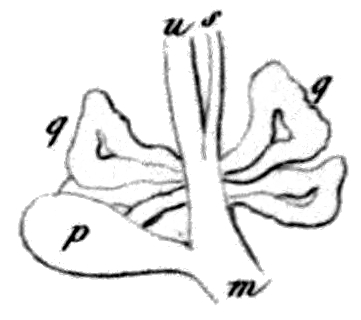
1856 drawing of a part of reproductive system showing dart sac (p), club shaped mucous glands (g) and a part of vagina (m).

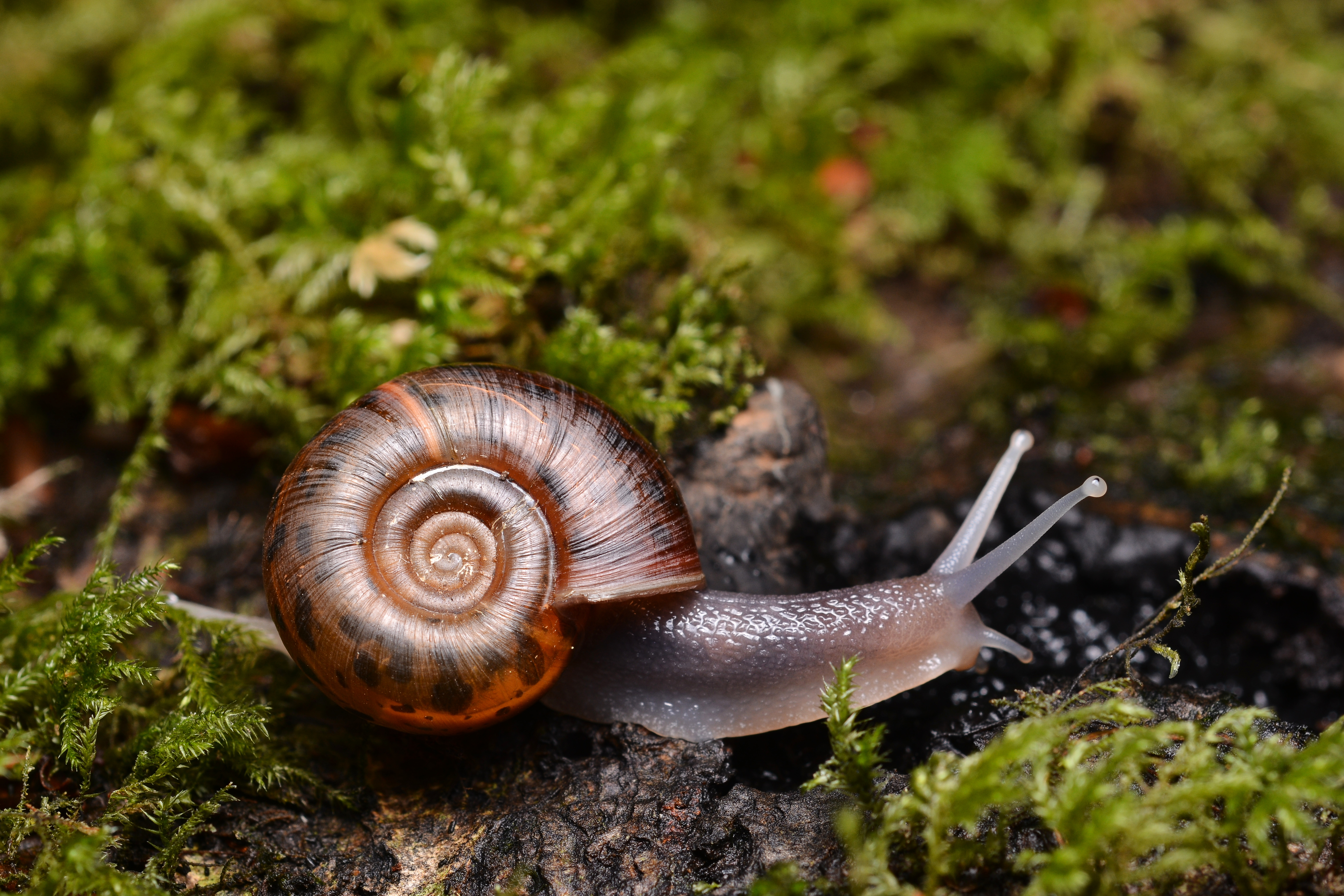
Right side view of Elona quimperiana.

The jaw has 11-16 narrow ribs.

The anatomy of Elona quimperiana was described in detail by Alfred Moquin-Tandon already in 1855-1856 and later by Gittenberger (1979).

Reproductive system: the genitalia have club-shaped mucous glands, in other words, the mucous glands are shortened into somewhat rounded triangular sacks. Mucous glands shaped like this are unusual in the Helicoidea, but are typical of the Elonidae. The dart sack is inserted in a sort of calyx at base. The love dart is curved at the end, with lens-like section. (Drawing of reproductive system by Gittenberger 1979.)

== Distribution ==
This species is found in France and Spain.

The Lusitanian snail Elona quimperiana has a remarkably disjunct distribution, limited to northwestern France (Brittany), northwestern Spain and the Basque Country.

== Habitat ==
This species lives in temperate and humid deciduous forests.

== Life cycle ==
Like other pulmonates, snails and slugs, the Quimper snail is hermaphrodite. Sexual maturity is reached at about two years of age. Mating takes place at mid-season and laying, usually underground, is deposited in tiny natural tunnels of the soil. There are two annual breeding periods in Brittany, with hatching occurring in the spring (April–May) and in the fall (September–October).

== Feeding habits ==
This species of snail feeds on mycelia found on rotten, dead stumps (principally oak). Occasionally, it is coprophagous and necrophagous. Like many other terrestrial gastropods, Elona quimperiana has a relatively limited dispersal capacity and probably survived during the Quaternary glaciations through significant fluctuations in its distribution area, just as its deciduous forest habitat did.

== See also ==
A closely related species is Norelona pyrenaica (Draparnaud, 1805) – synonym: Elona pyrenaica (Draparnaud, 1805).
