= Oestophora granesae =

Scientific classification
- Domain: Eukaryota
- Kingdom: Animalia
- Phylum: Mollusca
- Class: Gastropoda
- Order: Stylommatophora
- Family: Trissexodontidae
- Genus: Oestophora
- Species: O. granesae

Binomial name
- Oestophora granesae Arrébola, 1998

Species of gastropod

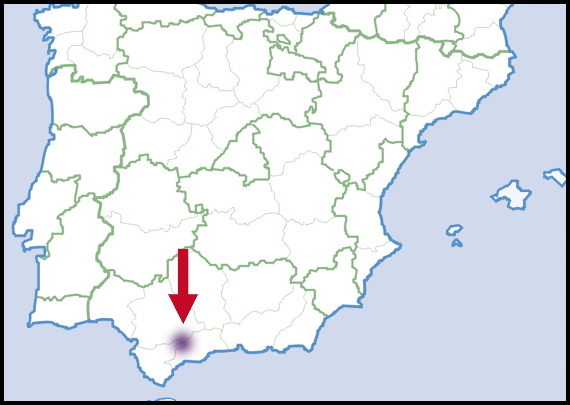
Native range of the species

Oestophora granesae is a species of gastropod belonging to the family Trissexodontidae.

The species is found in Spain.
