= Oestophora ortizi =

Conservation status
- Near Threatened (IUCN 3.1)

Scientific classification
- Kingdom: Animalia
- Phylum: Mollusca
- Class: Gastropoda
- Order: Stylommatophora
- Family: Trissexodontidae
- Genus: Oestophora
- Species: O. ortizi

Binomial name
- Oestophora ortizi Winter & Ripken, 1991

Synonyms
- Oestophora (Oestophora) ortizi De Winter & Ripken, 1991

Species of gastropod

Oestophora ortizi is a species of land snail in the family Trissexodontidae. It is endemic to Spain, where it is known only from Andalucia.

This snail is generally found in oak woodland habitat on limestone substrates. It lives in dense vegetation, sometimes under rocks.
