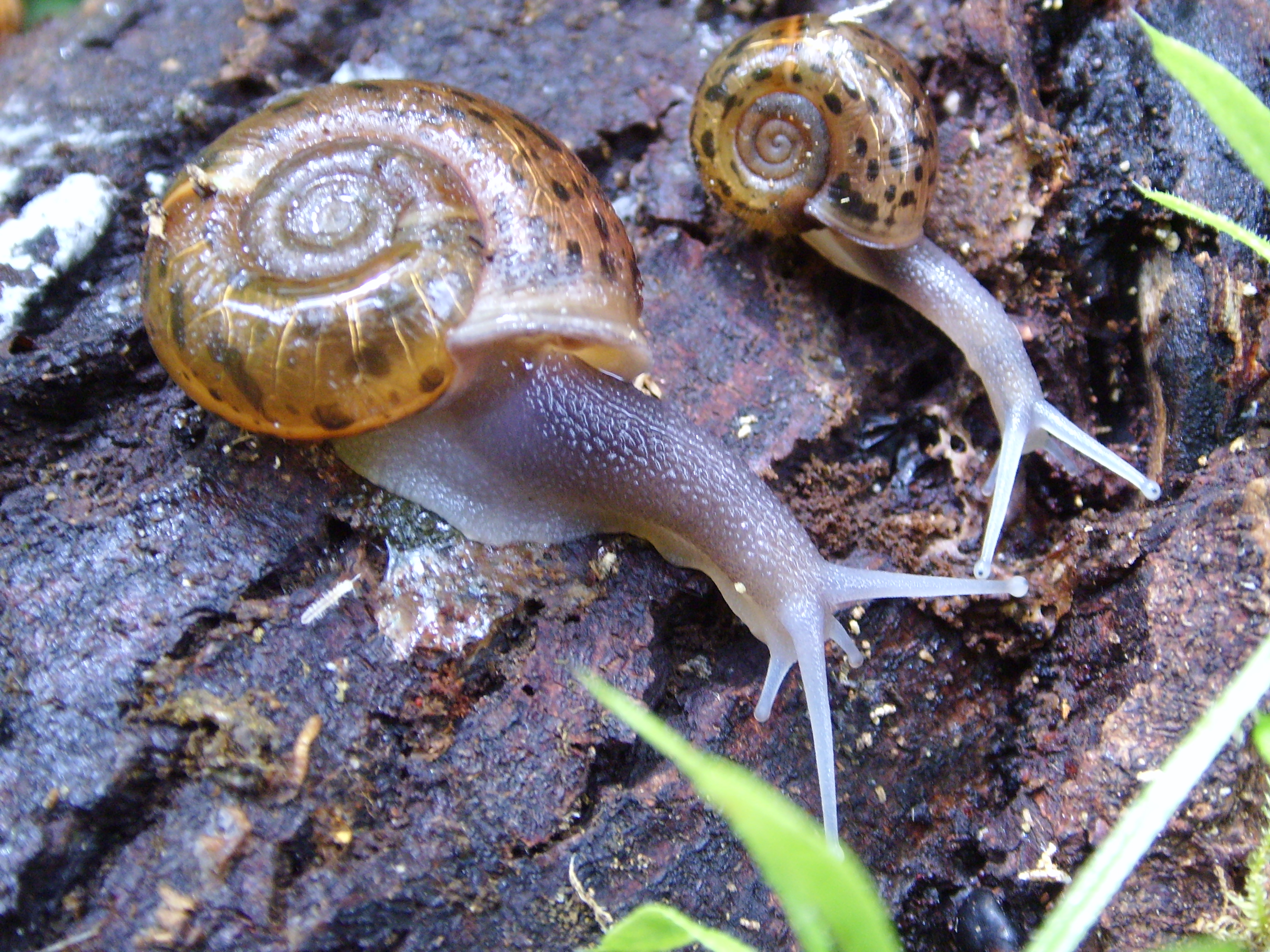
- A live adult and a juvenile of Elona quimperiana

Scientific classification
- Kingdom: Animalia
- Phylum: Mollusca
- Class: Gastropoda
- Order: Stylommatophora
- Suborder: Helicina
- Infraorder: Helicoidei
- Superfamily: Helicoidea
- Family: Elonidae; Gittenberger, 1977

= Elonidae =

Family of gastropods

Elonidae is a family of air-breathing land snails, terrestrial pulmonate gastropods mollusks in the superfamily Helicoidea.

This family is within the clade Eupulmonata (according to the taxonomy of the Gastropoda by Bouchet & Rocroi, 2005).

== Subfamilies and genera ==
The family Elonidae consists of two subfamilies (according to the taxonomy of the Gastropoda by Bouchet & Rocroi, 2005):

- Eloninae Gittenberger, 1977
- Klikiinae H. Nordsieck, 1986

=== Genera ===
Genera in the family Elonidae include:

- † Cyrtochilus F. Sandberger, 1875
- † Eurystrophe Gude, 1911
- †Joossia Pfeffer, 1930
- † Lychnopsis Vidal, 1917
- † Megalocochlea Wenz, 1919
- † Papillotopsis H. Binder, 2017
- † Puisseguria Schlickum, 1975

Eloninae

- The type genus is Elona H. Adams & A. Adams, 1855. It is a monotypic genus, with only one species: Elona quimperiana
- † Galactochiloides Wenz, 1919
- Norelona Nordsieck, 1986
  - Norelona pyrenaica (Draparnaud, 1805)
- † Tropidomphalus Pilsbry, 1895

† Klikiinae

- † Apula C. R. Boettger, 1909
- † Klikia Pilsbry, 1895
- † Pseudochloritis C. R. Boettger, 1909

Synonyms

- Sterna Albers, 1850: synonym of Elona H. Adams & A. Adams, 1855 ((Invalid: junior homonym of Sterna Linnaeus, 1758 [Aves]))
- † Steklovia Schlickum & Strauch, 1972: synonym of † Apula C. R. Boettger, 1909 † (junior subjective synonym)
