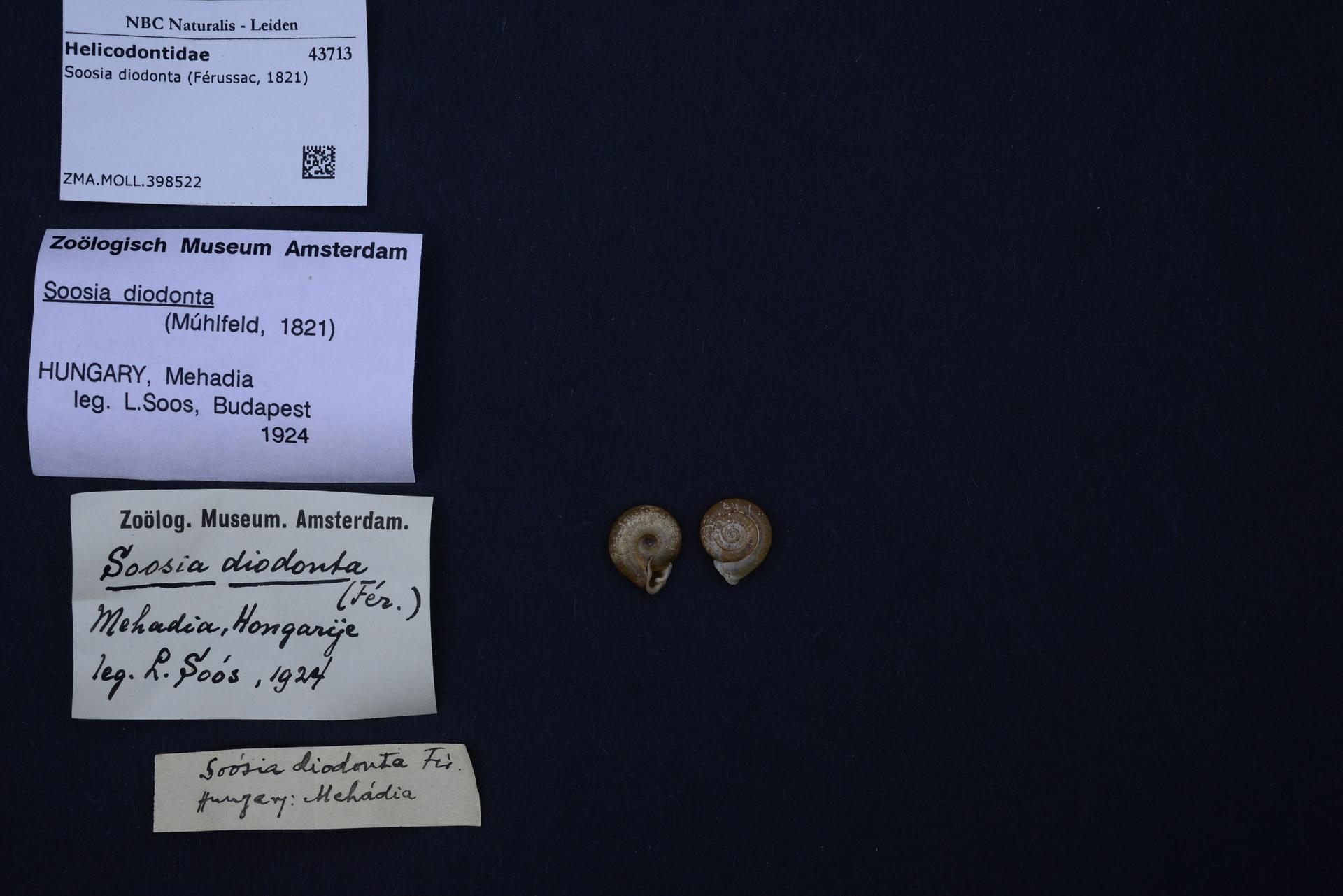

Scientific classification
- Kingdom: Animalia
- Phylum: Mollusca
- Class: Gastropoda
- Order: Stylommatophora
- Family: Helicodontidae
- Subfamily: Soosiinae
- Genus: Soosia; Hesse, 1918

= Soosia =

Genus of gastropods

Soosia is a genus of air-breathing land snails, terrestrial pulmonate gastropod mollusks in the family Helicodontidae.

== Species ==
Species within the genus Soosia include:

- Soosia diodonta
