= Oestophorella =

Scientific classification
- Kingdom: Animalia
- Phylum: Mollusca
- Class: Gastropoda
- Order: Stylommatophora
- Family: Trissexodontidae
- Genus: Oestophorella; Pfeffer, 1930
- Species: O. buvinieri

Binomial name
- Oestophorella buvinieri (Michaud, 1841)

Genus of land snails

Oestophorella is a monotypic genus of gastropods belonging to the family Trissexodontidae. The only species is Oestophorella buvinieri.

The species is found in Pyrenees.
