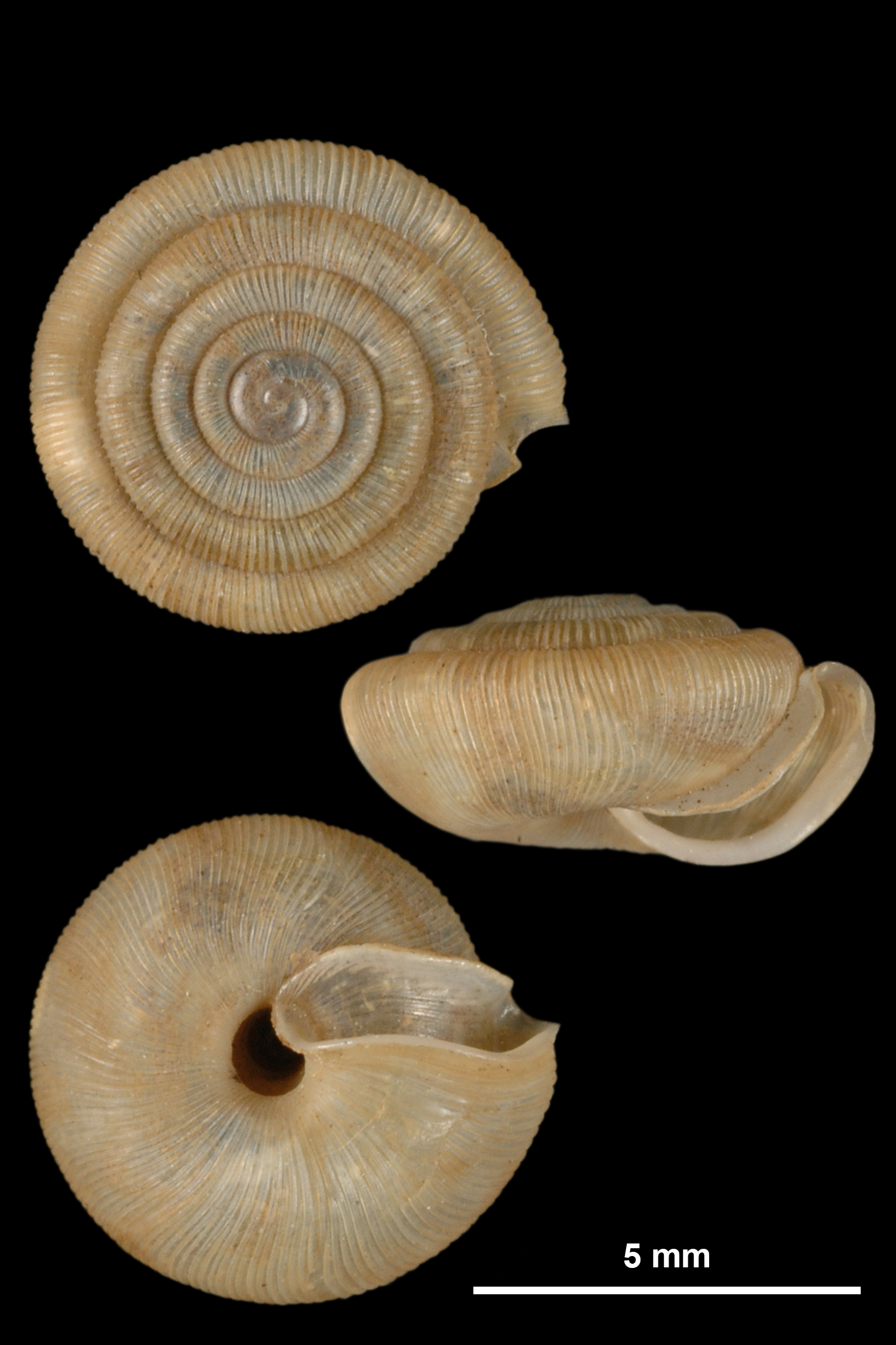
- Shell of Trissexodon constrictus (specimen at MNHN, Paris)

Conservation status
- Least Concern (IUCN 3.1)

Scientific classification
- Kingdom: Animalia
- Phylum: Mollusca
- Class: Gastropoda
- Order: Stylommatophora
- Family: Trissexodontidae
- Genus: Trissexodon
- Species: T. constrictus

Binomial name
- Trissexodon constrictus (Boubée, 1836)

Synonyms
- Helix constricta Boubée, 1836

= Trissexodon constrictus =

Species of gastropod

Trissexodon constrictus is a species of air-breathing land snail, a terrestrial pulmonate gastropod mollusc in the family Trissexodontidae.

Trissexodon constrictus is the type species of the genus Trissexodon.

== Distribution ==
This species endemic to the western Pyrenees and the Basque Country across 29 recorded localities, being recorded in Spain (throughout the Basque Mountains) and in France (in the Department of Hautes Pyrénées to Department of Pyrénées-Atlantiques), (under records of the IUCN).

== Description ==
The shell is finely and regularly ribbed. It is strongly depressed on the upper side. The lower side is rounded. The shell has 5-6 whorls. The aperture has a characteristic shape. The lip is reflected and forms a "U" shape when seen from above. The umbilicus is deep and covers 1/7 of the shell diameter.

The width of the shell is 6–8 mm; the height of the shell is 3–4 mm.

== Ecology ==
Trissexodon constrictus is found under stones in the soil of humid and shady deciduous forests, between moss, under leaf litter and occasionally near cave openings. It has been recorded from sea level to 800 m, and exceptionally to altitudes of 1500 m.
