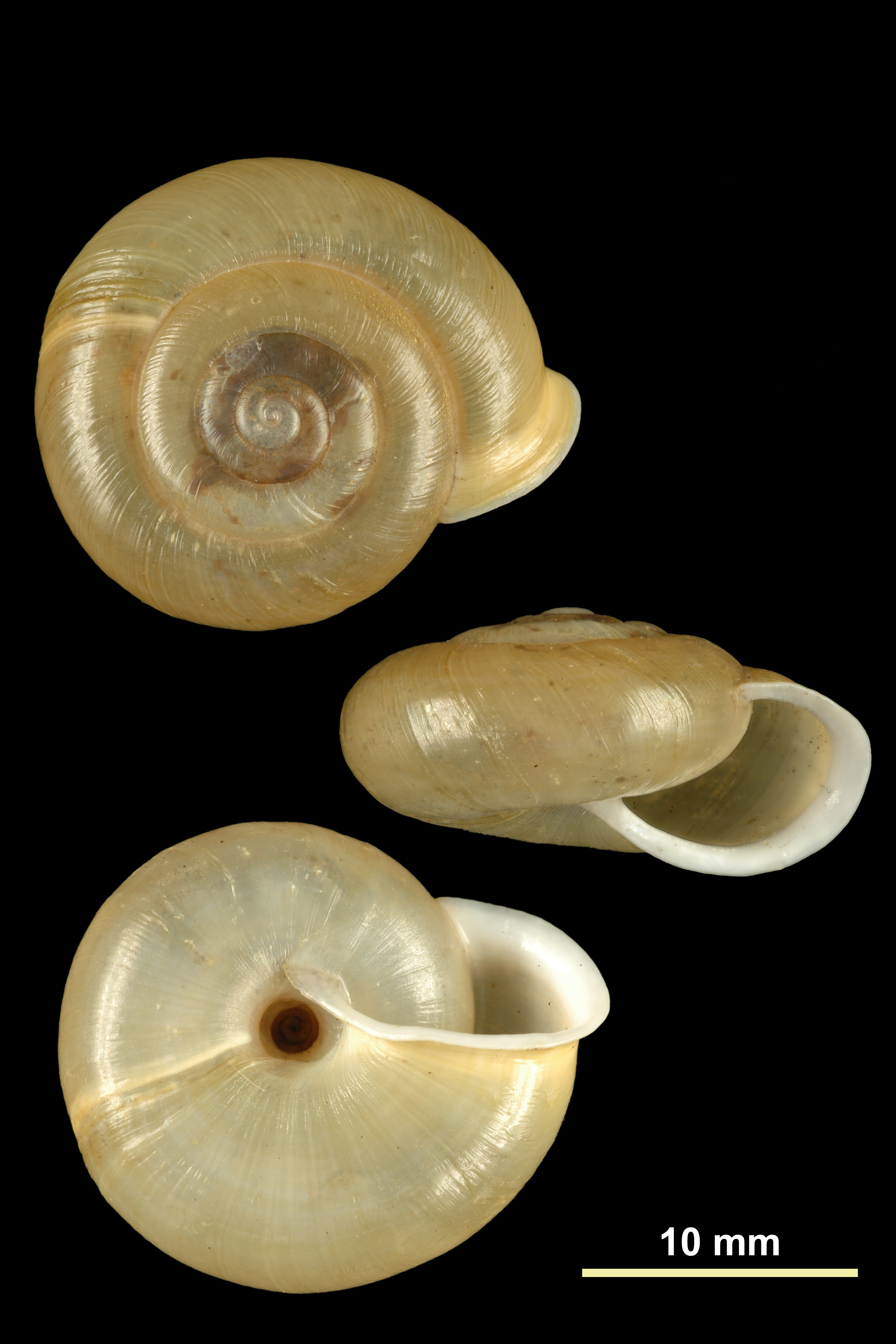
- Shell of Norelona pyrenaica (specimen at MNHN, Paris)

Scientific classification
- Kingdom: Animalia
- Phylum: Mollusca
- Class: Gastropoda
- Order: Stylommatophora
- Infraorder: Helicoidei
- Superfamily: Helicoidea
- Family: Elonidae
- Genus: Norelona; H. Nordsieck, 1986

Type species
- Helix pyrenaica Draparnaud, 1805

= Norelona =

Genus of gastropods

Norelona is a monospecific genus of air-breathing land snail, a terrestrial pulmonate gastropod mollusk in the family Elonidae.

== Species ==
- Norelona pyrenaica (Draparnaud, 1805)
