= Gasulliella =

Scientific classification
- Kingdom: Animalia
- Phylum: Mollusca
- Class: Gastropoda
- Order: Stylommatophora
- Family: Trissexodontidae
- Genus: Gasulliella; Gittenberger, 1980
- Species: G. simplicula

Binomial name
- Gasulliella simplicula (Morelet, 1845)

Genus of land snails

Gasulliella is a monotypic genus of gastropods belonging to the family Trissexodontidae. The only species is Gasulliella simplicula.

The species is found in Iberian Peninsula.
