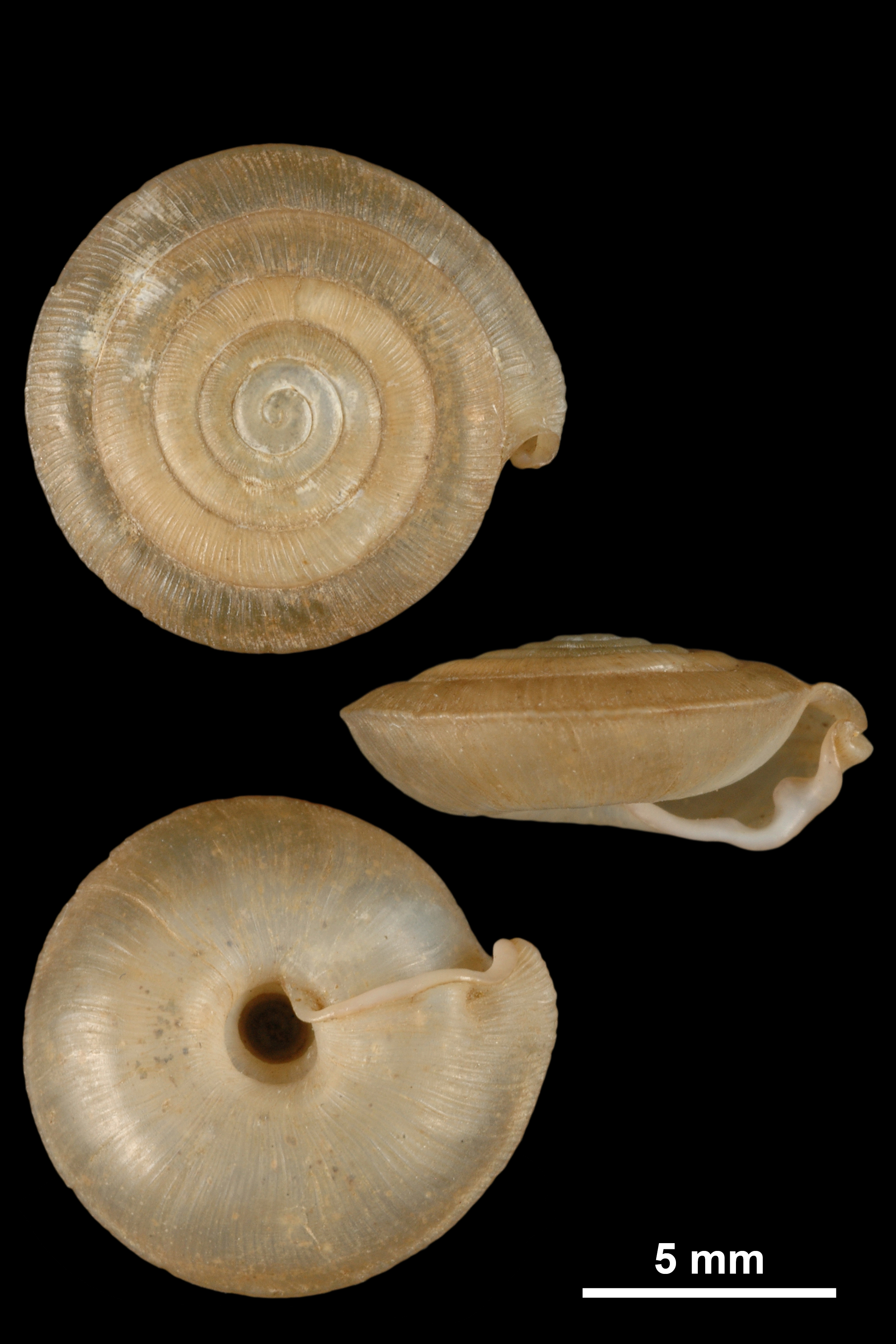
- Shell of Mastigophallus rangianus (specimen at MNHN, Paris)

Scientific classification
- Kingdom: Animalia
- Phylum: Mollusca
- Class: Gastropoda
- Order: Stylommatophora
- Infraorder: Helicoidei
- Superfamily: Helicoidea
- Family: Trissexodontidae
- Genus: Mastigophallus; P. Hesse, 1918

Type species
- Helix rangiana Michaud, 1831

= Mastigophallus =

Genus of gastropods

Mastigophallus is a genus of air-breathing land snails, terrestrial pulmonate gastropod mollusks in the subfamily Trissexodontinae of the family Trissexodontidae.

== Species ==
- Mastigophallus rangianus (Michaud, 1831)

Species brought into synonymy

- † Mastigophallus patellinus (Oppenheim, 1890): synonym of † Paracanariella patellina (Oppenheim, 1890)
- † Mastigophallus vialai [sic]: synonym of † Paracanariella vialaii (De Boissy, 1840) (incorrect subsequent spelling)
