= Atenia =

Scientific classification
- Kingdom: Animalia
- Phylum: Mollusca
- Class: Gastropoda
- Order: Stylommatophora
- Infraorder: Helicoidei
- Superfamily: Helicoidea
- Family: Helicodontidae
- Genus: Atenia; Gittenberger, 1968

Genus of gastropods

Atenia is a genus of air-breathing land snails, terrestrial pulmonate gastropod mollusks in the family Helicodontidae.

== Species ==
Species within the genus Atenia include:

- Atenia quadrasi (Hidalgo, 1885)
