= Falkneria =

Scientific classification
- Kingdom: Animalia
- Phylum: Mollusca
- Class: Gastropoda
- Order: Stylommatophora
- Family: Helicodontidae
- Subfamily: Helicodontinae
- Genus: Falkneria; H. Nordsieck, 1989

Genus of gastropods

Falkneria is a genus of air-breathing land snails, terrestrial pulmonate gastropod mollusks in the family Hygromiidae, the hairy snails and their allies.

This genus has incorrectly been referred to as "Falkneri", which was an orthographical error by Giusti & Manganelli in 1990.

== Species ==
Species within the genus Falkneri include:

- Falkneria camerani
