= Drepanostoma =

Scientific classification
- Kingdom: Animalia
- Phylum: Mollusca
- Class: Gastropoda
- Order: Stylommatophora
- Family: Helicodontidae
- Genus: Drepanostoma; Porro, 1836

Genus of gastropods

Drepanostoma is a genus of gastropods belonging to the family Helicodontidae.

The species of this genus are found in Central Europe, Italy.

Species:

- Drepanostoma helenae Manganelli & Giusti, 2000
- Drepanostoma nautiliforme Porro, 1836
