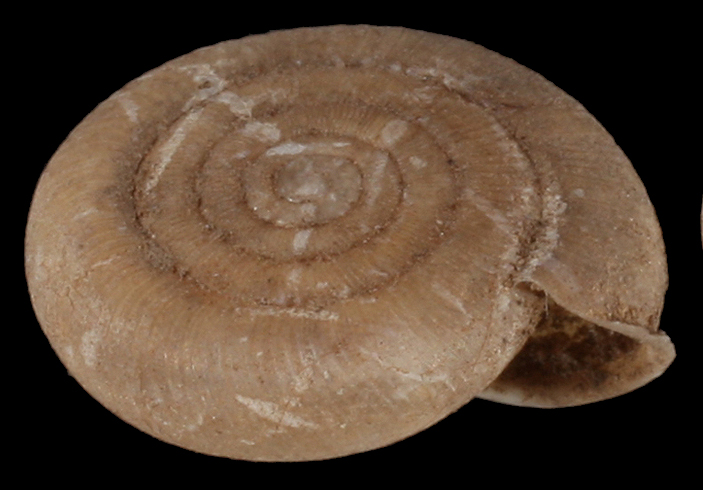
- A shell of Suboestophora hispanica
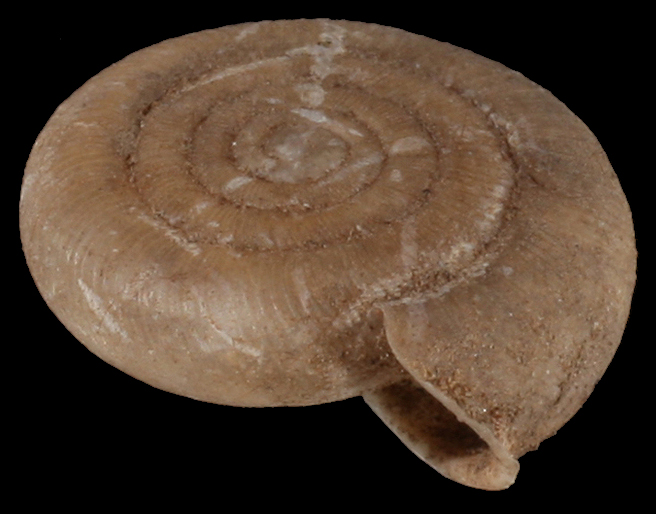
- Another view of shell of Suboestophora hispanica

Conservation status
- Vulnerable (IUCN 3.1)

Scientific classification
- Kingdom: Animalia
- Phylum: Mollusca
- Class: Gastropoda
- Order: Stylommatophora
- Family: Trissexodontidae
- Genus: Suboestophora
- Species: S. hispanica

Binomial name
- Suboestophora hispanica (Gude, 1910)

Synonyms
- Helicodonta hispanica Gude, 1910

= Suboestophora hispanica =

Species of gastropod

Suboestophora hispanica is a species of small air-breathing land snail, a terrestrial pulmonate gastropod mollusk in the family Trissexodontidae within the Helicoidea.

Suboestophora hispanica is the type species of the genus Suboestophora.

== Distribution ==
This species is endemic to Spain. The type locality is Valencia, Spain.

== Description ==
Suboestophora hispanica was originally described under the name Helicodonta hispanica by Gerard Pierre Laurent Kalshoven Gude in 1910.

Gude's original text (the type description) reads as follows:

Shell moderately umbilicated, lenticular, fulvous brown, rather thin,

sub-translucent; the nepionic whorls shining, the remainder dull, finely closely ribbed, the ribs regularly curved and becoming more distant on the last quarter-whorl. Spire depressed, apex prominent, suture shallow. Whorls 5½, a little rounded above, flattened below, obtusely angulated above the periphery, increasing slowly and regularly, the last ascending a little in front. Aperture crescent-shaped, oblique, margins distant, united by a very thin callus on the parietal wall, which is finely granulated. Peristome curved, scarcely thickened, reflexed, livid; upper margin a little arcuate at the junction with the shell-wall, curved slightly forward, then suddenly receding, basal nearly straight, columellar receding a little at first, then curved forward, triangularly dilated longitudinally, and impinging upon the umbilicus, which is deep and cylindrical. Diam. maj. 11, min. 10 mm.; alt. 5 mm.

Hab. — Valencia, Spain.

Type in my collection.

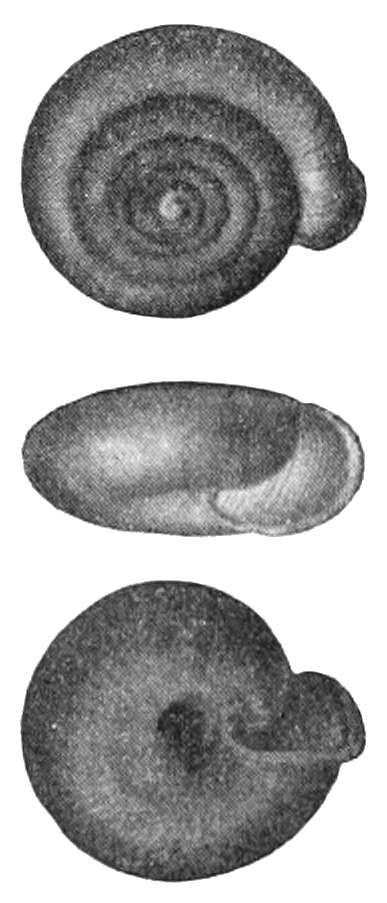
1910 photo of the shell from the original description

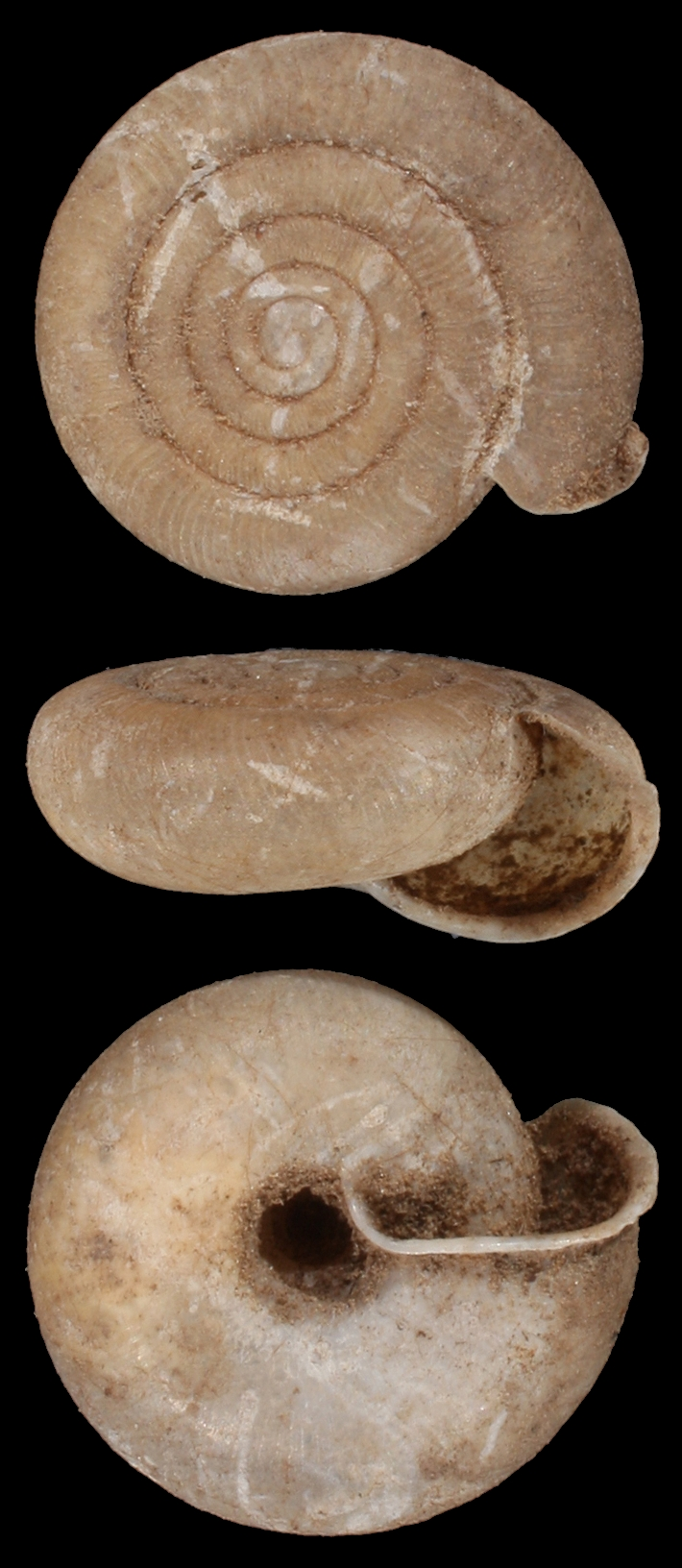
Photo showing apical, apertural and umbilical view of a shell
