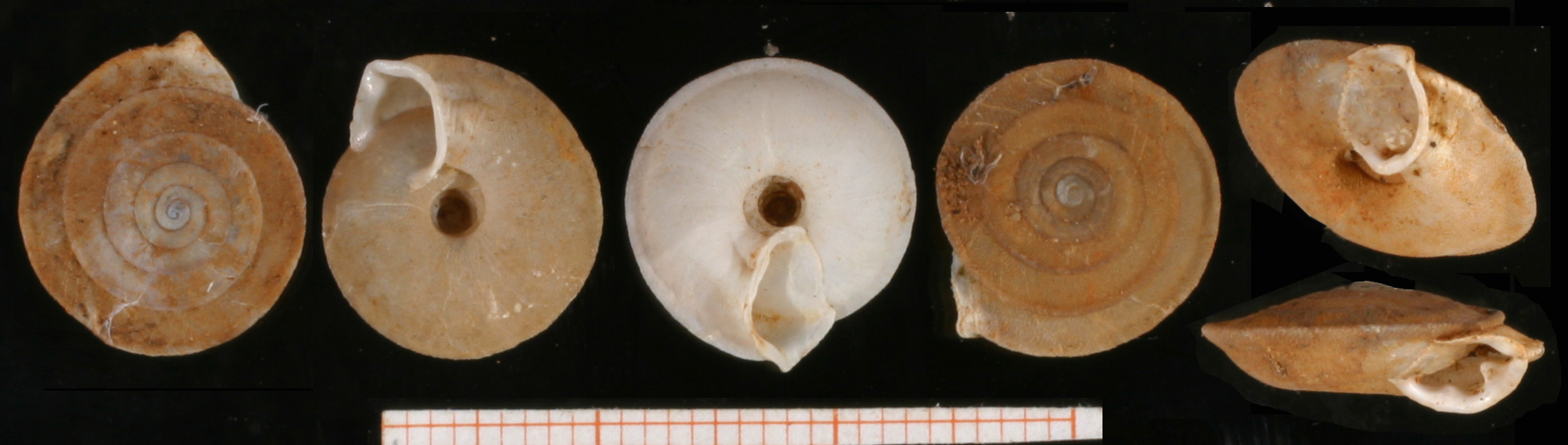
- shells of Gittenbergeria turriplana

Scientific classification
- Kingdom: Animalia
- Phylum: Mollusca
- Class: Gastropoda
- Order: Stylommatophora
- Superfamily: Helicoidea
- Family: Trissexodontidae
- Genus: Gittenbergeria; Schileyko, 1991

= Gittenbergeria =

Genus of gastropods

Gittenbergeria is a genus of air-breathing land snails, terrestrial pulmonate gastropod mollusks in the subfamily Gittenbergeriinae of the family Trissexodontidae.

== Species ==
Species within the genus Gittenbergeria include:

- Gittenbergeria turriplana (Morelet, 1845)
