= Gasullia =

Scientific classification
- Kingdom: Animalia
- Phylum: Mollusca
- Class: Gastropoda
- Order: Stylommatophora
- Family: Trissexodontidae
- Tribe: Carcacollinini
- Genus: Gasullia; Ortiz de Zárate López, 1961

Genus of land snails

Gasullia is a genus of terrestrial gastropods belonging to the family Trissexodontidae.

The sole species of this genus is found in Spain.

Species:

- Gasullia gasulli (Ortiz de Zárate López, 1961)
