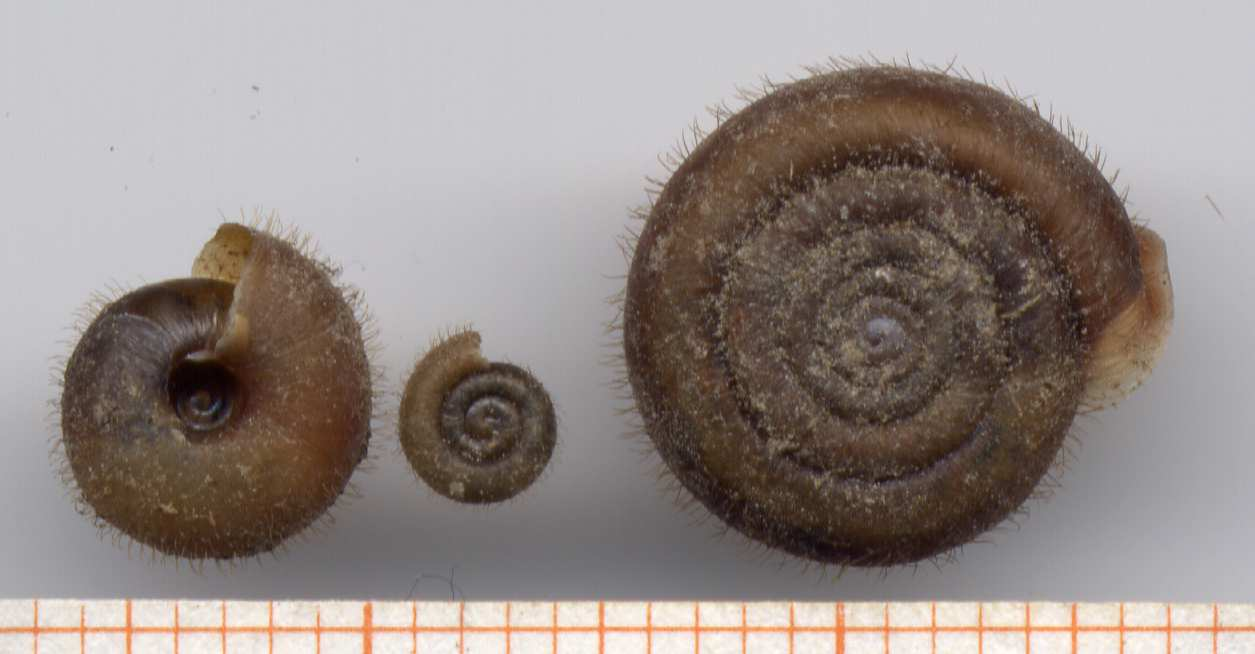
- Three shells of Helicodonta obvoluta, two juveniles and one adult. Scale bar shows mm and cm

Scientific classification
- Kingdom: Animalia
- Phylum: Mollusca
- Class: Gastropoda
- Order: Stylommatophora
- Infraorder: Helicoidei
- Superfamily: Helicoidea
- Family: Helicodontidae
- Genus: Helicodonta; Férussac, 1821

Type species
- Helix obvoluta O. F. Müller, 1774

Synonyms
- Chilodon Ehrenberg, 1831; Euphemia H. Beck, 1847; Gonostoma Held, 1838; Helicodonta (Helicodonta) A. Férussac, 1821· accepted, alternate representation; Helix (Gonostoma) Held, 1838 (invalid: junior homonym of Gonostoma Rafinesque, 1810); Helix (Helicodonta) A. Férussac, 1821; Helix (Trigonostoma) Fitzinger, 1833 (Invalid: Junior homonym of Trigonostoma Blainville, 1825 [Cancellariidae]; also a junior objective synonym of Helicodonta); Helix (Vortex) Beck, 1837 (Invalid: junior objective synonym of Helicodonta ); Trigonostoma Fitzinger, 1833 (Invalid: Junior homonym of Trigonostoma Blainville, 1825 [Cancellariidae]; also a junior objective synonym of Helicodonta); Vortex H. Beck, 1837 (Invalid: junior objective synonym of Helicodonta)

= Helicodonta =

Genus of gastropods

Helicodonta, common name the "cheese snail", is a genus of air-breathing land snail, a terrestrial pulmonate gastropod mollusk in the subfamily Helicodontinae of the family Helicodontidae.

The common name is based on the shape of the shell, which is reminiscent of a wheel of cheese.

== Species ==
Species within the genus Helicodonta include:

- Helicodonta angigyra (Rossmässler, 1834)
- Helicodonta langhofferi Wagner, 1912
- Helicodonta obvoluta (Müller, 1774)
- Helicodonta wilhelminae Maassen, 1991

Species brought into synonymy

- Helicodonta gyria (J. R. Roth, 1839) : synonym of Lindholmiola gyria (J. R. Roth, 1839) (unaccepted combination)
- Helicodonta hispanica Gude, 1910 : synonym of Suboestophora hispanica (Gude, 1910) (original combination)
- Helicodonta involuta (Thomä, 1845) † : synonym of Protodrepanostoma involutum (Thomä, 1845) † (new combination)
- Helicodonta planorbiformis (Sacco, 1886) † : synonym of Protodrepanostoma planorbiforme (Sacco, 1886) †
- Helicodonta sculpturata Gray, 1838 : synonym of Sculptaria sculpturata (Gray, 1838) (original combination)
