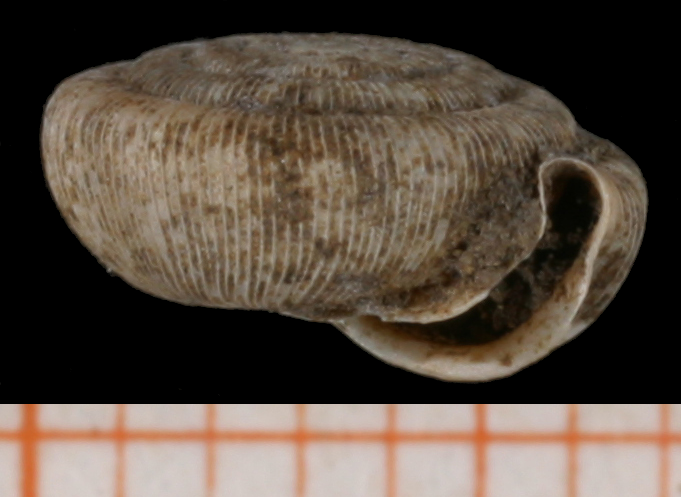
- Apertural view of a shell of Trissexodon constrictus, scale is in mm.

Scientific classification
- Kingdom: Animalia
- Phylum: Mollusca
- Class: Gastropoda
- Order: Stylommatophora
- Infraorder: Helicoidei
- Superfamily: Helicoidea
- Family: Trissexodontidae
- Genus: Trissexodon; Pilsbry, 1895

= Trissexodon =

Genus of gastropods

Trissexodon is a monotypic genus of air-breathing land snails, terrestrial pulmonate gastropod molluscs in the subfamily Trissexodontinae of the family Trissexodontidae.

== Species ==
- Trissexodon is the type genus of the family Trissexodontidae, its only species being Trissexodon constrictus (Boubée, 1836).

Synonyms

- † Trissexodon plioauriculatus (Sacco, 1889): synonym of † Protodrepanostoma plioauriculatum (Sacco, 1889)

Taxon inquirendum

- † Trissexodon subconstrictus (Souverbie, 1873)

== Distribution ==
The distribution of the genus Trissexodon includes the western Pyrenees.
