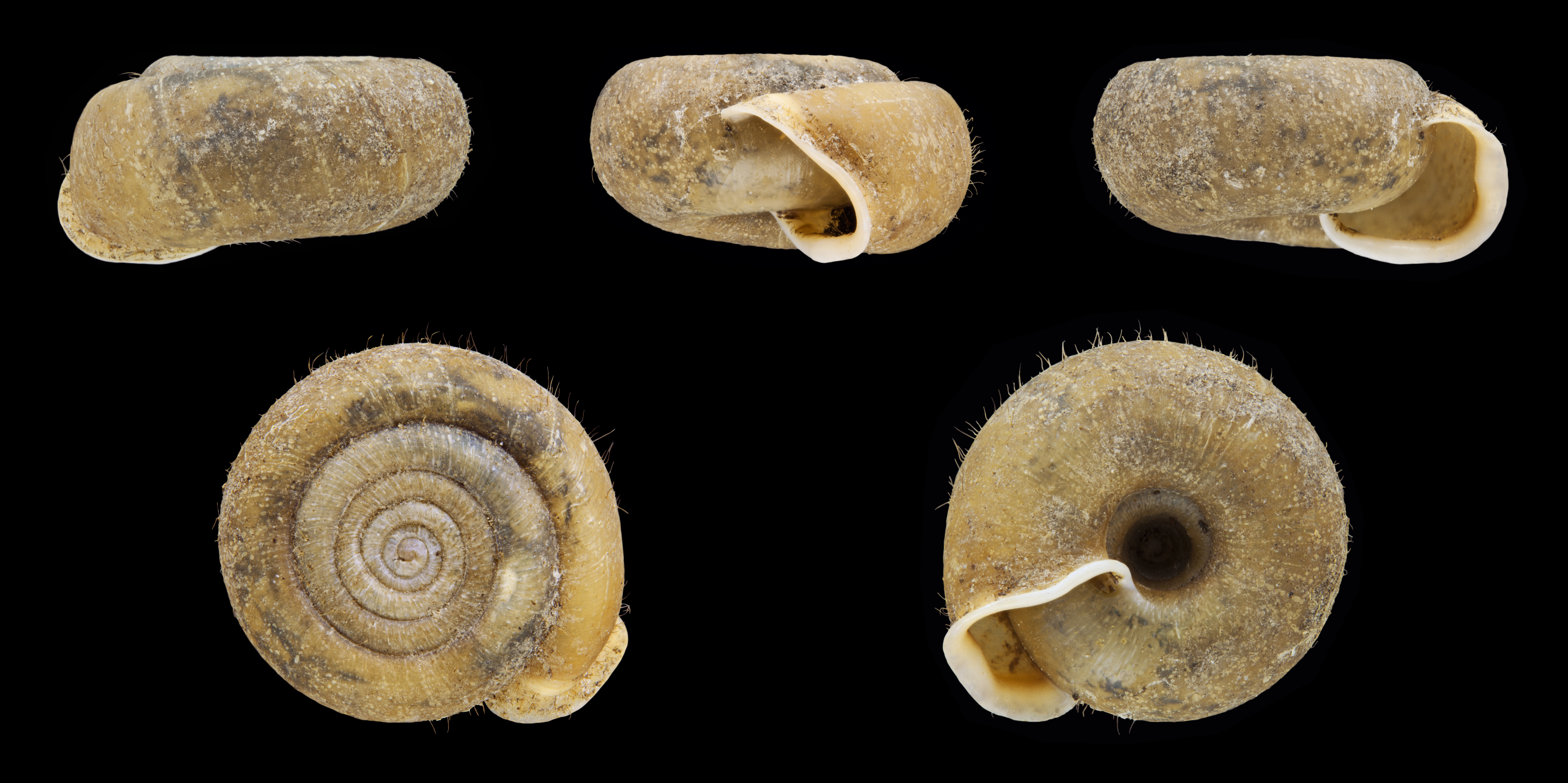
- The shell of an adult Helicodonta obvoluta

Conservation status
- Least Concern (IUCN 3.1)

Scientific classification
- Kingdom: Animalia
- Phylum: Mollusca
- Class: Gastropoda
- Order: Stylommatophora
- Family: Helicodontidae
- Genus: Helicodonta
- Species: H. obvoluta

Binomial name
- Helicodonta obvoluta (O. F. Müller, 1774)

= Helicodonta obvoluta =

Species of gastropod

Helicodonta obvoluta is a species of air-breathing land snail, a terrestrial pulmonate gastropod mollusk in the family Helicodontidae.

Subspecies

- Helicodonta obvoluta albanica A. J. Wagner, 1914
- Helicodonta obvoluta bosniaca O. Boettger, 1885
- Helicodonta obvoluta calabrica Degner, 1927
- Helicodonta obvoluta dentata (Westerlund, 1876)
- Helicodonta obvoluta obvoluta (O. F. Müller, 1774)

The distribution of this species is spread over large parts of Europe, where it inhabits deciduous and mixed forests. This species is sometimes called the "cheese snail" because the shape of the shell resembles that of a wheel of cheese.

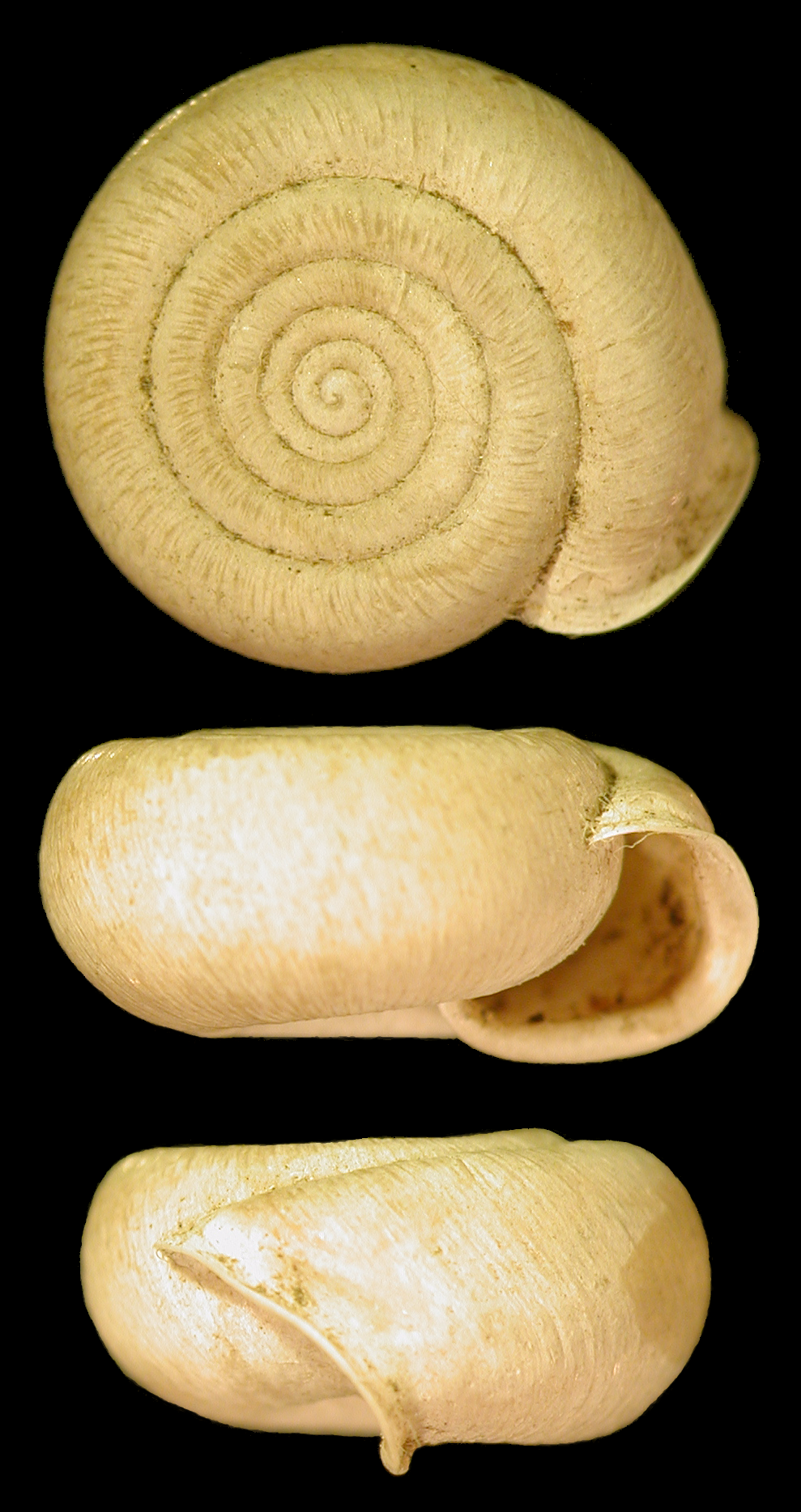
A shell of a Holocene Helicodonta obvoluta: apical, apertural and lateral view

== Description ==
Shells of juveniles and young adults of this snail are typically covered with hairs 1mm in length. The hair may be absent in older specimens. The dark-brown shell is characterized by a flat upper side with a very slightly sunken spire and a wide umbilicus. The peristome is flattened above and below. The white everted lip is slightly thickened centrally to form a callus in the palatal and parietal region, therefore the mouth seems to be separated into three embayments in some specimens. The shell diameter ranges from 10-15mm; the shell height from 5-7mm. The weight of the adult living snail is about 414.2±6.7 mg. In contrast to many other snail species within the superfamily Helicoidea, this species has no love darts.

== Life cycle ==
The average life span of Helicodonta obvoluta is 2 years, with a maximum of 3 years. The activity period stretches from April to November; daily activity is concentrated in the early morning and at night time. Mating can last for 2–3 hours. There are two periods of reproduction, the first one in spring (April–June), the second in autumn (August–October). The eggs are laid in clusters of 9-27 per clutch in rotten wood and are covered with a mucus layer for protection. Juveniles hatch after 14–31 days of incubation time, and reach maturity after 140–624 days. The spring generation may reach maturity in the same year, while the autumn generation has to overwinter as immature snails. Helicodonta obvoluta spends most of its lifespan near and in fallen tree trunks, which provide places for egg-laying, feeding, shelter in daytime and hibernation sites in winter. In the case of populations that live in milder, oceanic climates such as Great Britain, snails can also hibernate within leaf litter.

== Distribution ==
The main distribution zone of this species extends from north western Spain across France, Switzerland, Liechtenstein, Belgium, Luxembourg, the Netherlands, southern and central Germany, Austria, Czech Republic, Slovakia, Poland, Hungary, Slovenia, Croatia, Italy, Bosnia and Herzegovina and Serbia. There are also isolated populations in southeastern England and northern Germany, which may be remnants of an earlier, more extensive, distribution range. The distribution in Albania, North Macedonia and Greece is unclear, as the populations there belong to Helicodonta albanica, which is assigned as separate species by many authors, while others treat it as subspecies of Helicodonta obvoluta.
