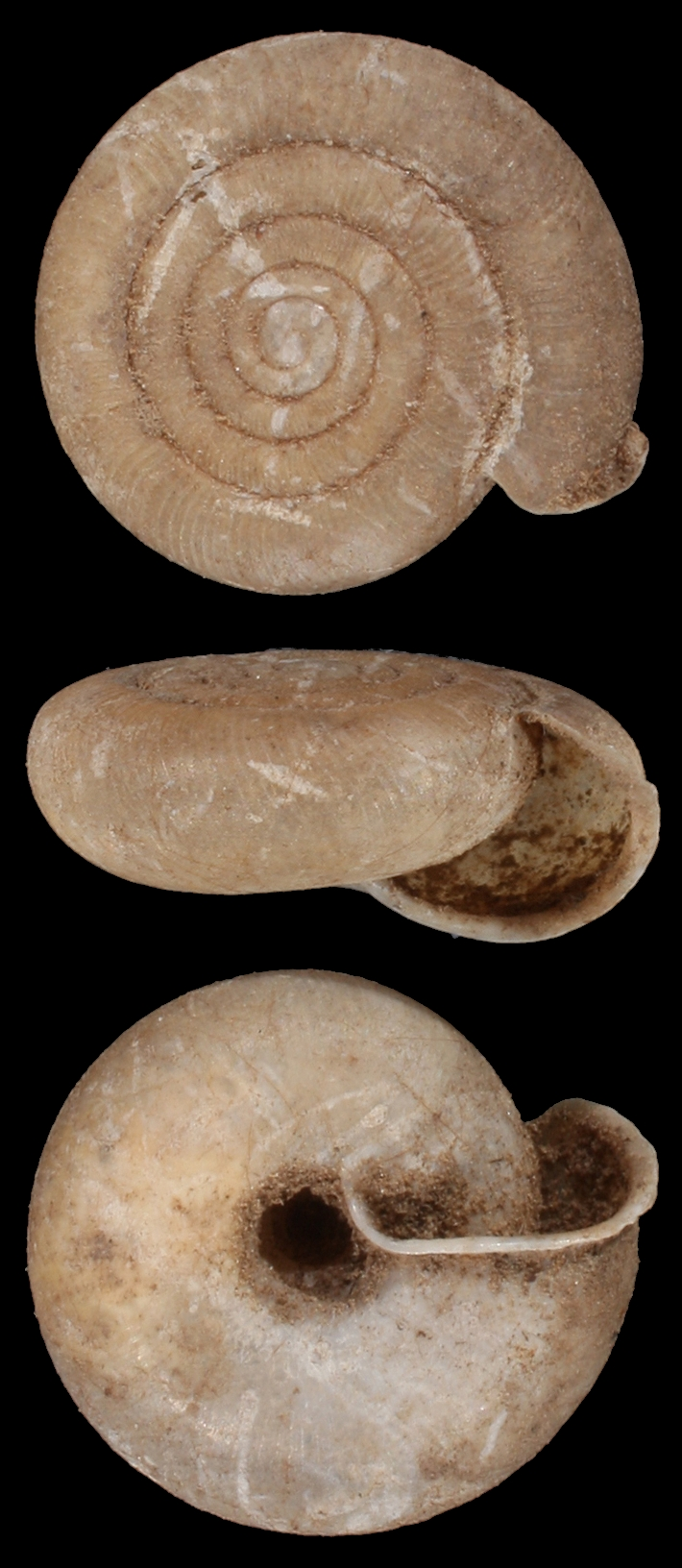
- Apical, apertural and umbilical view of a shell of Suboestophora hispanica.

Scientific classification
- Domain: Eukaryota
- Kingdom: Animalia
- Phylum: Mollusca
- Class: Gastropoda
- Order: Stylommatophora
- Family: Trissexodontidae
- Genus: Suboestophora; Ortiz de Zárate López, 1962

Diversity
- 6-7 species

= Suboestophora =

Genus of gastropods

Suboestophora is a genus of air-breathing land snail, a terrestrial pulmonate gastropod mollusk in the family Trissexodontidae, within the Helicoidea. It is found in Spain.

== Species ==
Species within the genus Suboestophora include:

- Suboestophora altamirai (Ortiz de Zárate López, 1962)
- Suboestophora boscae (Hidalgo, 1869)
- Suboestophora ebria Corbella i Alonso, 2004
- Suboestophora gasulli (Ortiz de Zárate Rocandio & Ortiz de Zárate López, 1961) (synonym: Gasullia gasulli (Ortiz de Zárate Rocandio & Ortiz de Zárate López, 1961))
- Suboestophora hispanica (Gude, 1910) - type species
- Suboestophora jeresae (Ortiz de Zárate López, 1962)
- Suboestophora kuiperi (Gasull, 1966)
- Suboestophora tarraconensis (Aguilar-Amat, 1935)
