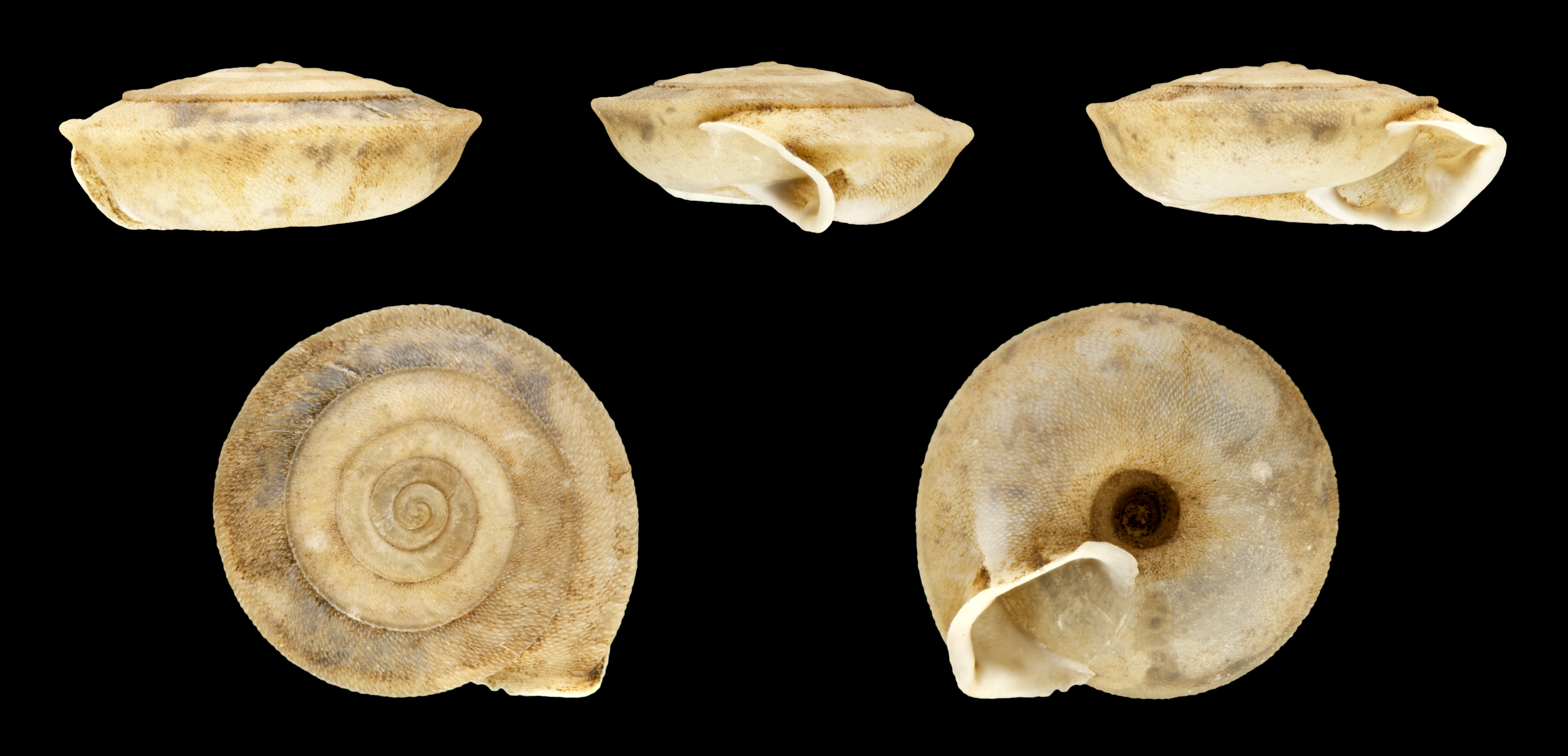
- Shell of Gittenbergeria turriplana

Conservation status
- Near Threatened (IUCN 3.1)

Scientific classification
- Kingdom: Animalia
- Phylum: Mollusca
- Class: Gastropoda
- Order: Stylommatophora
- Family: Trissexodontidae
- Genus: Gittenbergeria
- Species: G. turriplana

Binomial name
- Gittenbergeria turriplana (Morelet, 1845)

Synonyms
- Helix turriplana Morelet, 1845; Gittenbergeri turriplana (Morrelet, 1845) [orth. error]

= Gittenbergeria turriplana =

Species of land snail

Gittenbergeria turriplana is a species of air-breathing land snail, terrestrial pulmonate gastropod mollusks in the family Trissexodontidae.

== Distribution ==
map showing Algarve region in southern Portugal, where Gittenbergeria turriplana is endemic to.

This species is endemic to the Algarve, southern Portugal. It is a frequent species in the Algarve and locally very common.

== Description ==
The shell is brown with a characteristic microsculpture, depressed with a strong keel. The first whorls are almost flat. The aperture is narrow. Margin reflected and turned outward. There are two teeth on the lower edge corresponding to 2 conspicuous depressions on the outer shell. The umbilicus is open and eccentric.

The width of the shell is 12–14 mm. The height of the shell is 5–6 mm.

Animal is almost black with a lighter foot, upper tentacles very long.

== Ecology ==
It lives in low altitudes on calcareous substrate, close to the coast. It is frequent at old walls and in old gardens and parks in cities, also in shrublands and cultivated areas.
