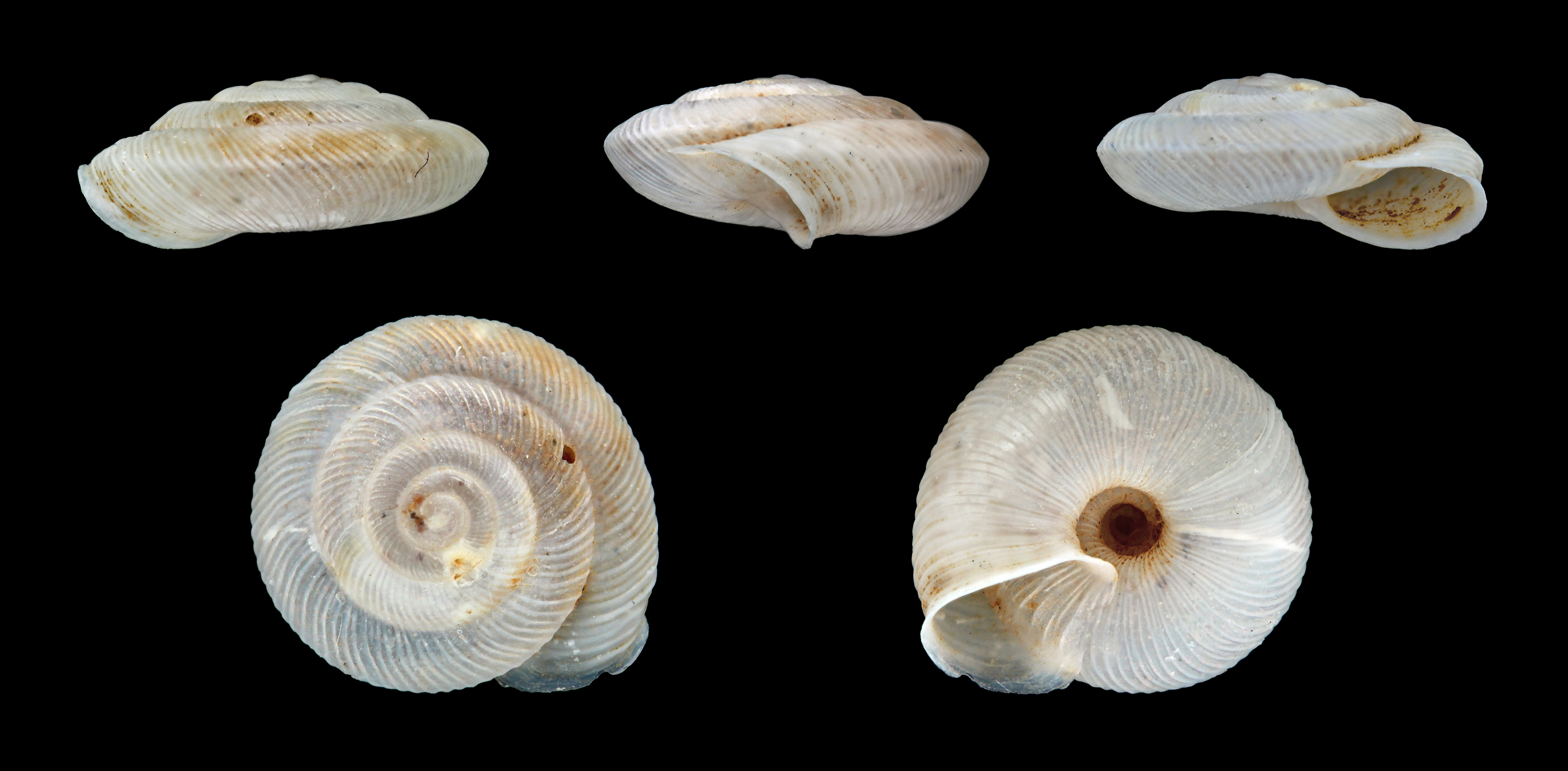
- Caracollina lenticula

Scientific classification
- Kingdom: Animalia
- Phylum: Mollusca
- Class: Gastropoda
- Order: Stylommatophora
- Family: Trissexodontidae
- Genus: Caracollina; Beck, 1837

= Caracollina =

Genus of land snails

Caracollina is a genus of gastropods belonging to the family Trissexodontidae.

The species of this genus are found in Mediterranean regions.

Species:

- Caracollina barreri (Bourguignat, 1881)
- Caracollina huloti Pallary, 1913
- Caracollina lenticula (Michaud, 1831)
