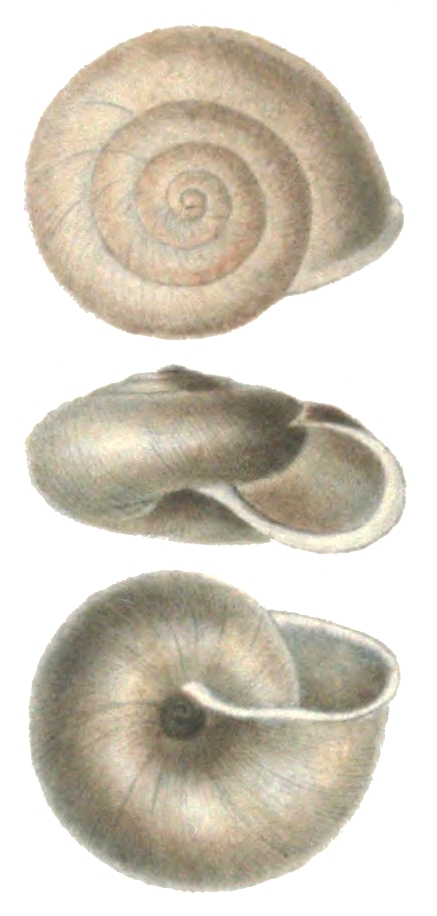
- Three views of the shell of Norelona pyrenaica

Scientific classification
- Kingdom: Animalia
- Phylum: Mollusca
- Class: Gastropoda
- Order: Stylommatophora
- Family: Elonidae
- Genus: Norelona; H. Nordsiek, 1986
- Species: N. pyrenaica

Binomial name
- Norelona pyrenaica (Draparnaud, 1805)

Synonyms
- Helix pyrenaica Draparnaud, 1805; Elona pyrenaica (Draparnaud, 1805)

= Norelona pyrenaica =

Species of gastropod

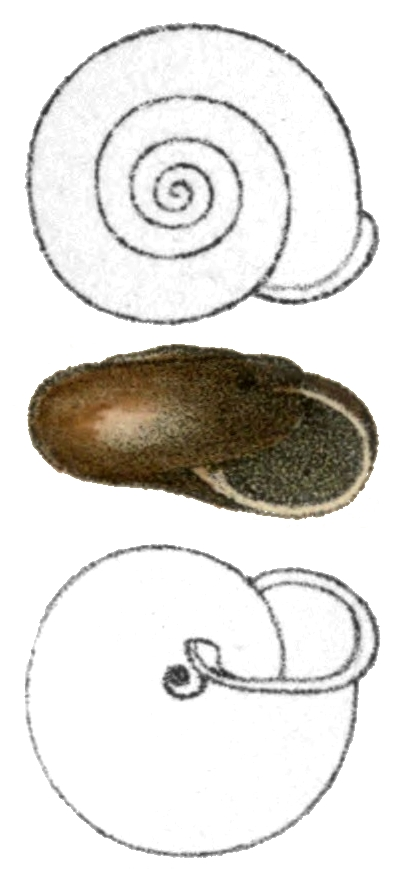
Drawings of the shell of Norelona pyrenaica

Norelona pyrenaica is a species of air-breathing land snail, a terrestrial pulmonate gastropod mollusk in the family Elonidae.

Norelona pyrenaica is the type species of the genus Norelona.

== Shell description ==
The shell is narrowly umbilicated, flattened above, thin, pellucid, olivaceous corneous. The shell has 4½ whorls, that are rather flattened. The last whorl is not descending. The peristome is acute, reflected, white-lipped.

The width of the shell is 17–21 mm. The height of the shell is 9–11 mm.

== Anatomy ==
This species of snail makes and uses love darts. (Image of reproductive system.)

== Distribution ==
This species is endemic to the eastern Pyrenees, France. (map of distribution, map 2)

It is also known from Spain since 2007.
