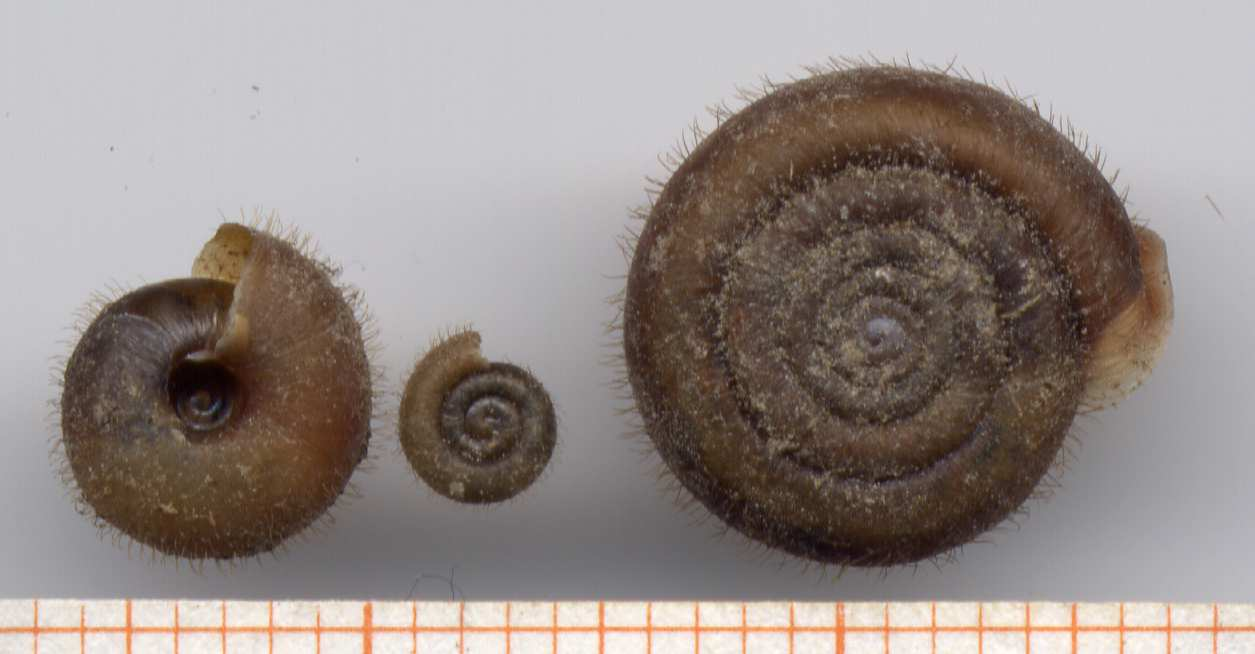
- Three shells of Helicodonta obvoluta, two juveniles and one adult. Scale bar shows mm and cm

Scientific classification
- Kingdom: Animalia
- Phylum: Mollusca
- Class: Gastropoda
- Order: Stylommatophora
- Suborder: Helicina
- Infraorder: Helicoidei
- Superfamily: Helicoidea
- Family: Helicodontidae; Kobelt, 1904

Type genus
- Helicodonta A. Férussac, 1821

= Helicodontidae =

Family of gastropods

Helicodontidae (also known as Cheese snails) is a family of air-breathing land snails, terrestrial pulmonate gastropod mollusks in the superfamily Helicoidea (according to the taxonomy of the Gastropoda by Bouchet & Rocroi, 2005).

== Subfamilies and genera ==
There are two subfamilies in the family Helicodontidae.

The type genus is Helicodonta Férussac, 1821.

- Subfamily Helicodontinae Kobelt, 1904 - synonym: Gonostomatinae Kobelt, 1904, Drepanostomatini Schileyko, 1991
  - Atenia Gittenberger, 1968
  - Darderia Altaba, 2006
  - Drepanostoma Porro, 1836
  - Falkneria H. Nordsieck, 1989
  - Helicodonta Férussac, 1821
  - Soosia Hesse, 1918
- Subfamily Lindholmiolinae Schileyko, 1978
  - Lindholmiola Hesse, 1931
