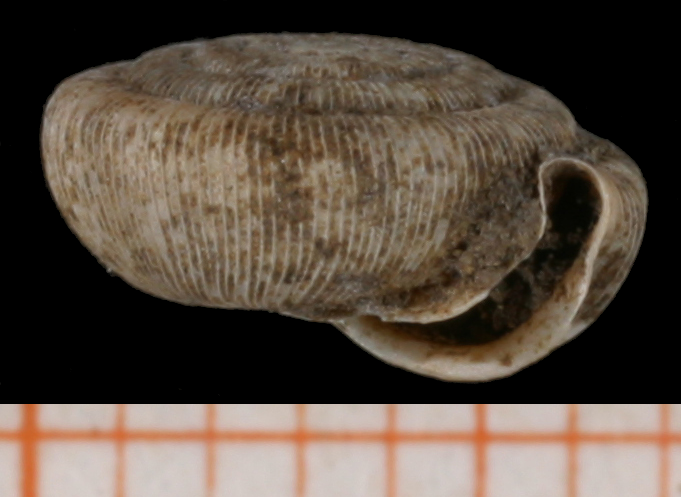
- Apertural view of the shell of Trissexodon constrictus. Scale is in mm. A regularly ribbed shell is one of the characteristics of this family.

Scientific classification
- Kingdom: Animalia
- Phylum: Mollusca
- Class: Gastropoda
- Order: Stylommatophora
- Suborder: Helicina
- Infraorder: Helicoidei
- Superfamily: Helicoidea
- Family: Trissexodontidae; H. Nordsieck, 1987

Genera
- See text

Synonyms
- Caracollinini H. Nordsieck, 1987; Oestophorini H. Nordsieck, 1987; Mastigophallini Schileyko, 1991; Gittenbergeriinae Schileyko, 1991

= Trissexodontidae =

Family of gastropods

Trissexodontidae is a family of air-breathing land snails, terrestrial pulmonate gastropod mollusks in the superfamily Helicoidea (according to the taxonomy of the Gastropoda by Bouchet & Rocroi, 2005).

This family has no subfamilies. The family Trissexodontidae was separated out from the families Hygromiidae and Helicodontidae, and some authors still classify these species within those families.

== Distribution ==
The distribution of Trissexodontidae includes the Iberian Peninsula, northwest Africa, Azores, Canary Islands, Madeira and Cape Verde.

== Genera ==
Genera within the family Trissexodontidae include:

- Caracollina Beck, 1837
- Gasullia Ortiz de Zárate López, 1962
- Gasulliella Gittenberger, 1980 - with only one species, Gasulliella simplicula (Morelet, 1845)
- Gittenbergeria Schileyko, 1991
- Mastigophallus Hesse, 1918 - with only one species, Mastigophallus rangianus (Michaud, 1831)
- Oestophora Hesse, 1907
- Oestophorella Pfeffere, 1929
- Trissexodon Pilsbry, 1895 - type genus of the family Trissexodontidae
- Spirorbula Lowe, 1852 - probable classification, from Madeira and Porto Sancto
- Suboestophora Ortiz de Zárate López, 1962

== Description ==
Shells of species in the family Trissexodontidae are flat and regularly ribbed. The periostracum of the shell surface has no hairs.

A description of the reproductive system was summarized by Prieto et al. (1993).

In this family, the number of haploid chromosomes is known only for the genus Oestophora (n=30).
