= Montserratina bofilliana =

Conservation status
- Near Threatened (IUCN 3.1)

Scientific classification
- Kingdom: Animalia
- Phylum: Mollusca
- Class: Gastropoda
- Order: Stylommatophora
- Family: Canariellidae
- Genus: Montserratina
- Species: M. bofilliana

Binomial name
- Montserratina bofilliana Fagot, 1884

Species of gastropod

Montserratina bofilliana is a species of land snail in the family Canariellidae, the hairy snails and their allies. It is endemic to Spain.

This snail is limited to four mountains in northeastern Spain, including Sant Llorenç del Munt and Montserrat. It has a limited range across these mountains, but it is common in parts of its range. It lives in rocky areas in forested habitat. Its habitat is located in nature reserves, where it receives some protection.
