= Canariella leprosa =

Conservation status
- Vulnerable (IUCN 3.1)

Scientific classification
- Kingdom: Animalia
- Phylum: Mollusca
- Class: Gastropoda
- Order: Stylommatophora
- Family: Canariellidae
- Genus: Canariella
- Species: C. leprosa

Binomial name
- Canariella leprosa (Shuttleworth, 1852)

Synonyms
- Helix leprosa Shuttleworth, 1852

Species of gastropod

Canariella leprosa is a species of small air-breathing land snails, terrestrial pulmonate gastropod molluscs in the family Canariellidae, the hairy snails and their allies. This species is endemic to Tenerife, Canary Islands.

Its status as a species is uncertain. It may be a subspecies (C. h. leprosa) of Canariella hispidula.
