= Canariella pthonera =

Conservation status
- Vulnerable (IUCN 3.1)

Scientific classification
- Kingdom: Animalia
- Phylum: Mollusca
- Class: Gastropoda
- Order: Stylommatophora
- Family: Canariellidae
- Genus: Canariella
- Species: C. pthonera

Binomial name
- Canariella pthonera Mabille, 1883

Species of gastropod

Canariella pthonera is a species of small air-breathing land snails, terrestrial pulmonate gastropod mollusks in the family Canariellidae, the hairy snails and their allies. This species is endemic to Spain.
