= Pyrenaearia cantabrica poncebensis =

Conservation status
- Near Threatened (IUCN 2.3)

Scientific classification
- Domain: Eukaryota
- Kingdom: Animalia
- Phylum: Mollusca
- Class: Gastropoda
- Order: Stylommatophora
- Family: Hygromiidae
- Genus: Pyrenaearia
- Species: P. cantabrica
- Subspecies: P. c. poncebensis

Trinomial name
- Pyrenaearia cantabrica poncebensis Ortiz de Zarate, 1956

Species of gastropod

Pyrenaearia cantabrica poncebensis is a subspecies of small air-breathing land snail, a terrestrial pulmonate gastropod mollusc in the family Hygromiidae, the hairy snails and their allies.

This species is endemic to Spain.
