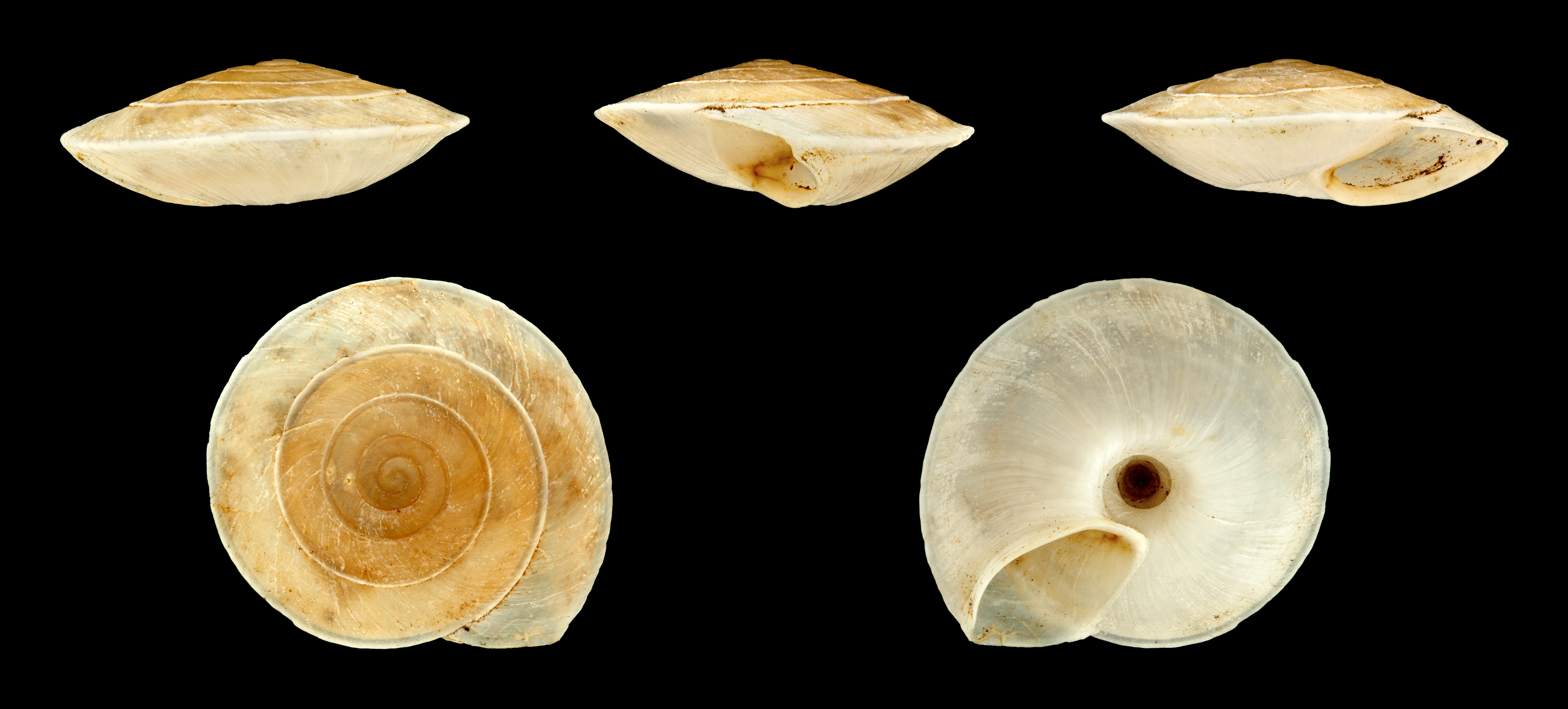
- Five views of a shell of Canariella planaria

Conservation status
- Least Concern (IUCN 3.1)

Scientific classification
- Kingdom: Animalia
- Phylum: Mollusca
- Class: Gastropoda
- Order: Stylommatophora
- Family: Canariellidae
- Genus: Canariella
- Species: C. planaria

Binomial name
- Canariella planaria (Lamarck, 1822)

= Canariella planaria =

Species of gastropod

Canariella planaria is a species of small air-breathing land snail, a terrestrial pulmonate gastropod mollusk in the family Canariellidae, the hairy snails and their allies. This species is endemic to the north-eastern coastal area of the island of Tenerife, in the Canary Islands.

Canariella planaria
