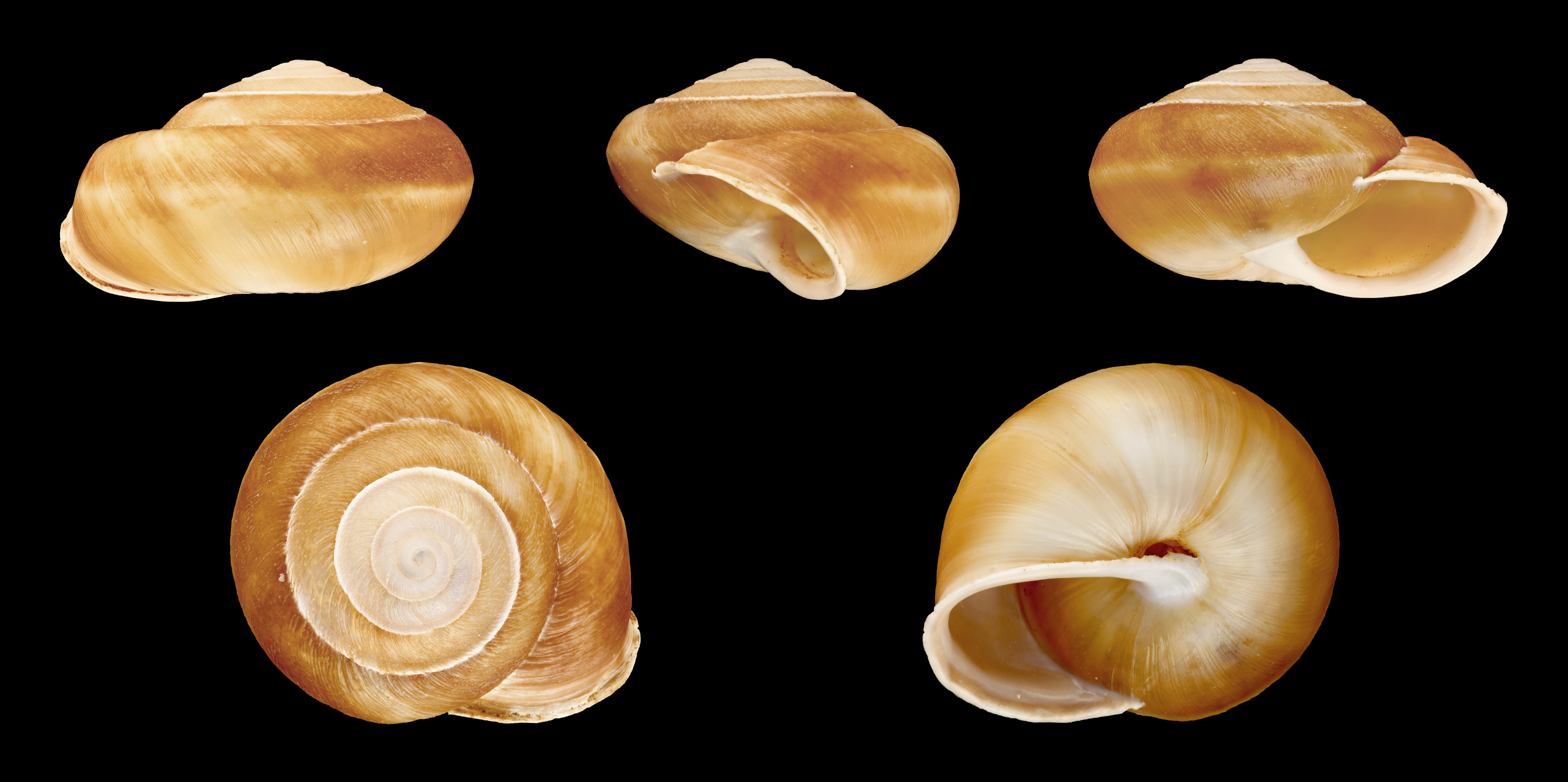
- A shell of Canariella plutonia

Scientific classification
- Kingdom: Animalia
- Phylum: Mollusca
- Class: Gastropoda
- Order: Stylommatophora
- Family: Canariellidae
- Genus: Canariella; Hesse, 1918

= Canariella =

Genus of gastropods

Canariella is a genus of small air-breathing land snails, terrestrial pulmonate gastropod molluscs in the family Canariellidae, the hairy snails and their allies.

== Species ==
Species within the genus Canariella are:

- †Canariella bakonyensis Kókay, 2006
- Canariella berthelotii (d'Orbigny, 1836)
- Canariella bimbachensis Ibáñez & M. R. Alonso, 2002
- Canariella discobolus (Shuttleworth, 1852)
- Canariella eutropis (L. Pfeiffer, 1861)
- Canariella falkneri M. R. Alonso, Ibáñez & Ponte-Lira, 2002
- Canariella gerti Groh, 2021 †
- Canariella giustii Ibáñez & M. R. Alonso, 2006
- Canariella gomerae (Wollaston, 1878)
- Canariella hispidula (Lamarck, 1822)
- Canariella huttereri Ponte-Lira & Groh, 1994
- Canariella jandiaensis Ibáñez & Ponte-Lira, 2006
- Canariella leprosa (Shuttleworth, 1852)
- †Canariella massiliensis (Matheron, 1843)
- Canariella multigranosa (Mousson, 1872)
- †Canariella orzolae E. Gittenberger & Ripken, 1985
- Canariella planaria (Lamarck, 1822)
- Canariella plutonia (R. T. Lowe, 1861)
- †Canariella politula (de Boissy, 1840)
- Canariella pontelirae Hutterer, 1994
- Canariella pthonera (Mabille, 1883)
- Canariella ronceroi Ponte-Lira, 2002
- Canariella squamata M. R. Alonso, Ibáñez & Ponte-Lira, 2003
- †Canariella sublenticuloides (Łomnicki, 1886)
- Canariella tenuicostulata M. R. Alonso, Ibáñez & Ponte-Lira, 2003
- †Canariella theodori (De Stefani, 1880)
- Canariella tillieri M. R. Alonso, Ibáñez & Ponte-Lira, 2003
