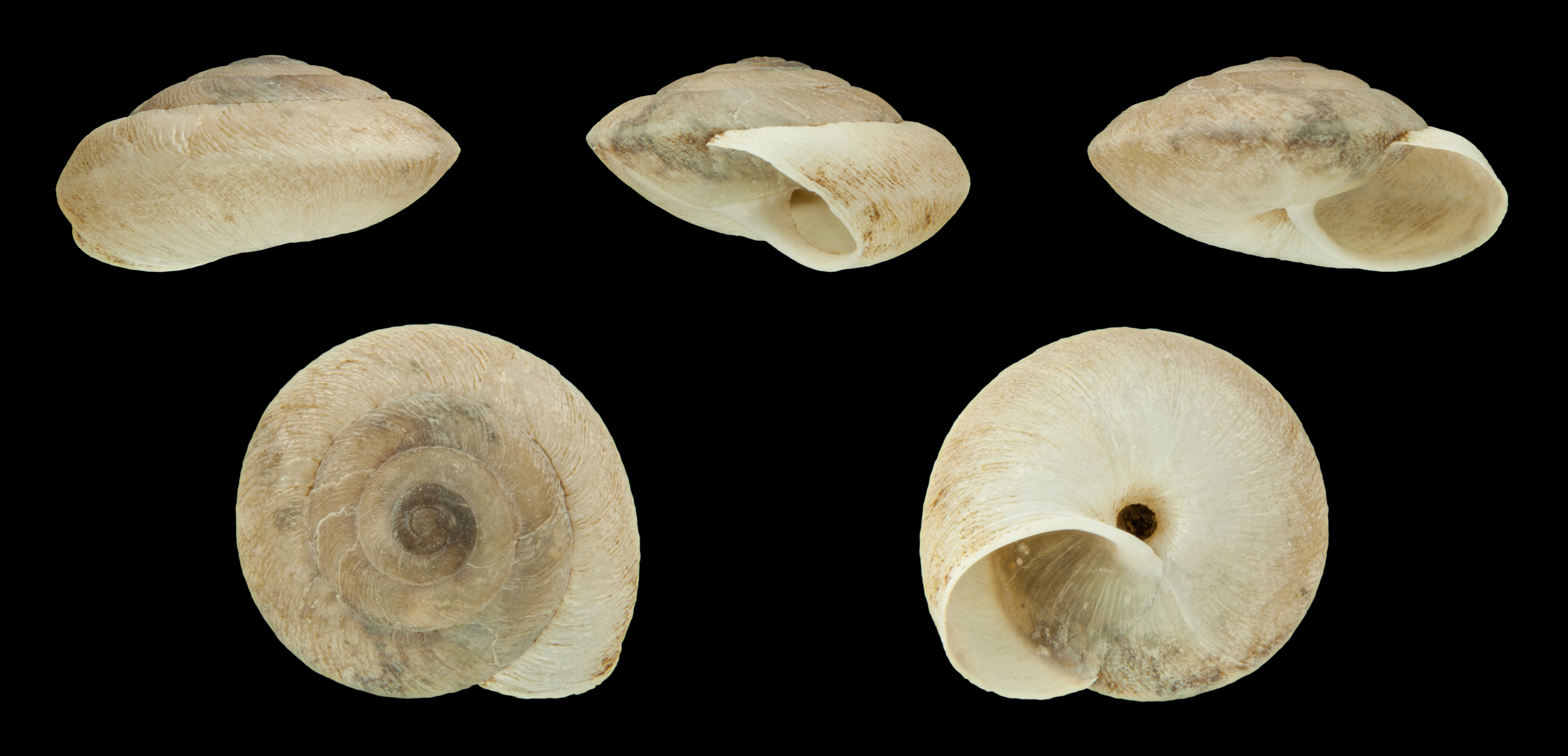
- A shell of Canariella hispidula

Scientific classification
- Kingdom: Animalia
- Phylum: Mollusca
- Class: Gastropoda
- Order: Stylommatophora
- Family: Canariellidae
- Genus: Canariella
- Species: C. hispidula

Binomial name
- Canariella hispidula (Lamarck, 1822)

Synonyms
- synonyms include: C. barbata Férussac & Deshayes, 1832; C. beata Wollaston, 1878; C. bertheloti Férussac, 1835; C. everia Mabille, 1882; C. fortunata Shuttleworth, 1852; C. lanosa Férussac, 1835; C. lens Férussac, 1821; Helicodonta salteri Gude, 1911; C. subhispidula Mousson, 1872

= Canariella hispidula =

Species of gastropod

Canariella hispidula is a species of small, air-breathing land snail, terrestrial pulmonate gastropod mollusk in the family Canariellidae, the hairy snails and their allies.

Canariella hispidula is the type species of the genus Canariella.

== Distribution ==
This species is endemic to the Canary Islands, specifically to Tenerife.

== Shell description ==
The shell is moderately umbilicated, conoid, solid, light rufous above, paler below, especially towards the umbilicus. Nepionic whorls are finely granulated, the remainder closely covered with fine curved riblets, and densely infested with granules arranged in quincunx above, but somewhat irregularly below. The spire is pyramidal. Apex is acute. Suture is linear. The shell has five whorls, that are slightly flattened above, convex below, obtusely carinated at the periphery and obtusely angulated round the umbilicus, increasing regularly, the last nearly twice as wide as the penultimate, shortly deflexed in front, and slightly constricted behind the peristome.

The aperture is semi-rounded, oblique, with margins approaching each other, united by a thin callus on the parietal wall. The peristome is scarcely thickened, reflexed, whitish, with the upper margin slightly curved, basal rounded, columellar ascending, and slightly dilated. The umbilicus moderately wide and deep, showing a portion of the penultimate whorl.

The width of the shell is 10.5–12 mm. The height of the shell is 6 mm.

Canariella hispidula
