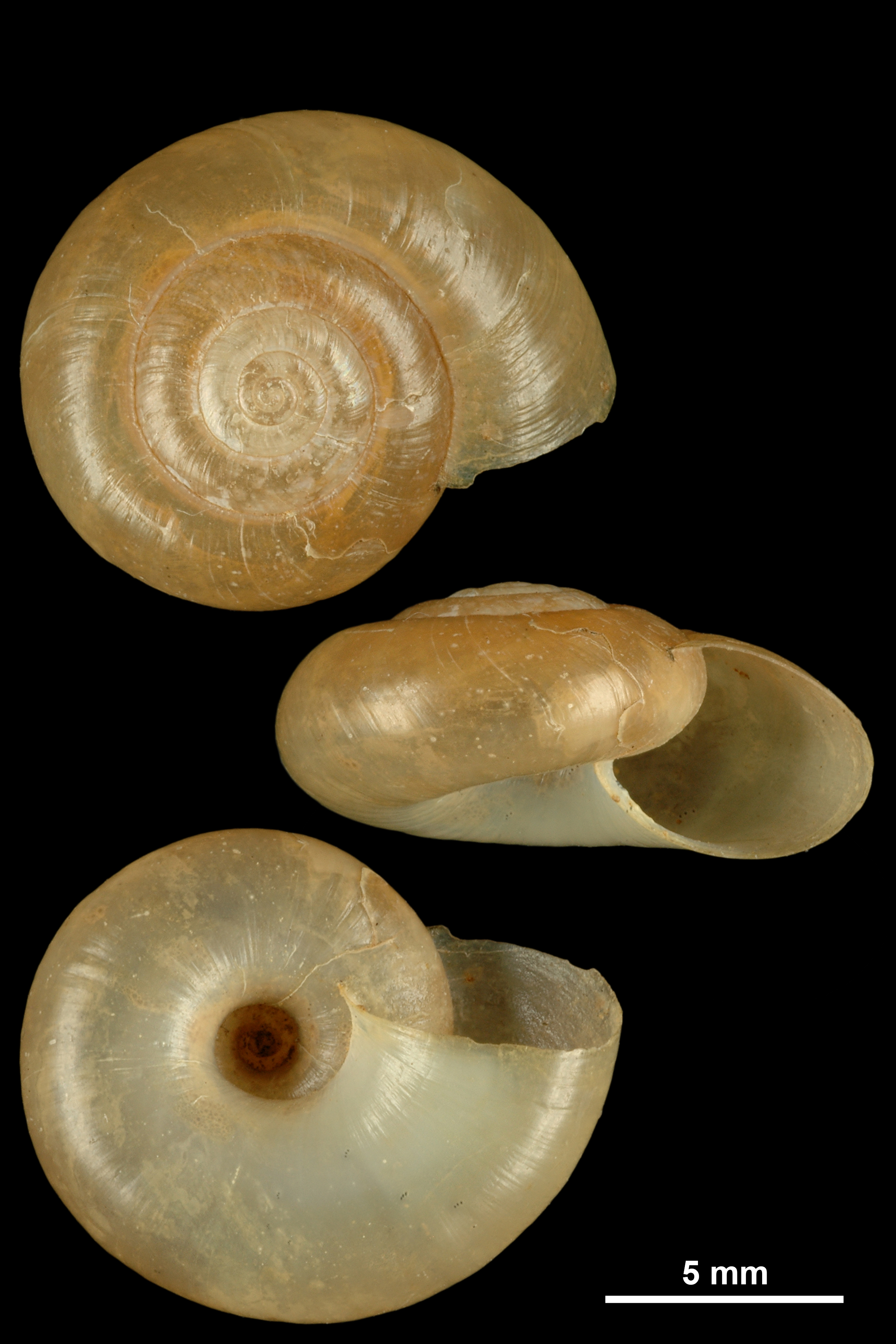
- Shell of Aegopinella epipedostoma (specimen at MNHN, Paris)

Scientific classification
- Kingdom: Animalia
- Phylum: Mollusca
- Class: Gastropoda
- Order: Stylommatophora
- Family: Gastrodontidae
- Genus: Aegopinella
- Species: A. epipedostoma

Binomial name
- Aegopinella epipedostoma (Fagot, 1879)
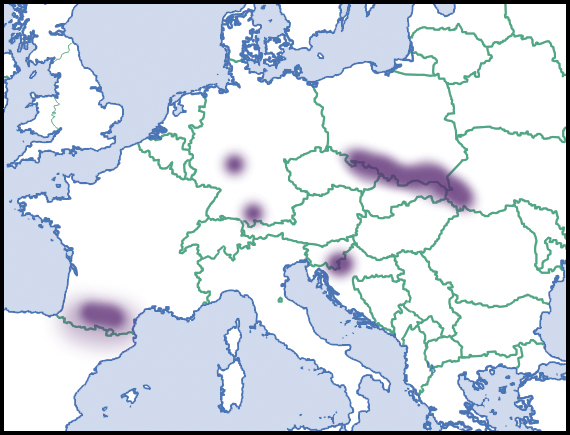

Synonyms
- Aegopinella (Politenella) epipedostoma (Fagot, 1879) (unaccepted subgeneric classification); Zonites epipedostoma Fagot, 1879 (original combination)

= Aegopinella epipedostoma =

Species of gastropod

Aegopinella epipedostoma is a species of small land snail, a terrestrial pulmonate gastropod mollusk in the family Gastrodontidae, the glass snails.

Subspecies

- Aegopinella epipedostoma epipedostoma (Fagot, 1879)
- Aegopinella epipedostoma iuncta Hudec, 1964

== Description ==
The diameter of the shell attains 10 mm (0.4 in), its height 5 mm (0.2 in).

(Original description in Latin) The shell is slightly convex and depressed with a broad umbilicus and barely noticeable striations. It is convex above and compressed below. The spire is slightly convex with a minute, obtuse apex. There are five slightly convex and depressed whorls, with the first being minute and the others growing more rapidly. They are separated by an impressed suture. The body whorl is larger, depressed-rounded, and the base is somewhat widened at the aperture, which is hardly tectiform and is not descending. The aperture has a lunate shape and is ovate-oblong and scarcely compressed. The peristome is straight, simple and acute.

== Distribution ==
This species occurs in the Czech Republic, Ukraine and other countries (Poland, France, Spain).
