= Pyrenaearia cotiellae =

Conservation status
- Vulnerable (IUCN 3.1)

Scientific classification
- Kingdom: Animalia
- Phylum: Mollusca
- Class: Gastropoda
- Order: Stylommatophora
- Family: Hygromiidae
- Genus: Pyrenaearia
- Species: P. cotiellae

Binomial name
- Pyrenaearia cotiellae Fagot, 1906

Synonyms
- Pyrenaeania cotiellae Fagot, 1906 [orth. error]

Species of mollusc

Pyrenaearia cotiellae is a species of land snail in the family Hygromiidae, the hairy snails and their allies. It is endemic to Spain, where it is known only from the Cotiella mountain range in the Spanish Pyrenees.

This snail has been recorded in only one location, living in elevations that range between 2000 and 2900 meters. Its total range is less than 20 square kilometers. It lives in rocky habitat, hiding in cracks in limestone. It is active when conditions are moist, and inactive in dry or snowy conditions. The population is probably stable, but it may be threatened by habitat alteration caused by climate change.
