= Schileykiella =

Scientific classification
- Kingdom: Animalia
- Phylum: Mollusca
- Class: Gastropoda
- Order: Stylommatophora
- Family: Canariellidae
- Genus: Schileykiella; Manganelli, Sparacio & Giusti, 1989

Genus of land snails

Schileykiella is a genus of gastropods belonging to the family Canariellidae.

The species of this genus are found in Italy.

Species:

- Schileykiella bodoni Cianfanelli, Manganelli & Giusti, 2004
- Schileykiella mariarosariae R.Viviano, A.Viviano, Liberto, Reitano & Sparacio, 2019
- Schileykiella parlatoris (Bivona, 1839)
- Schileykiella reinae (L.Pfeiffer, 1856)
