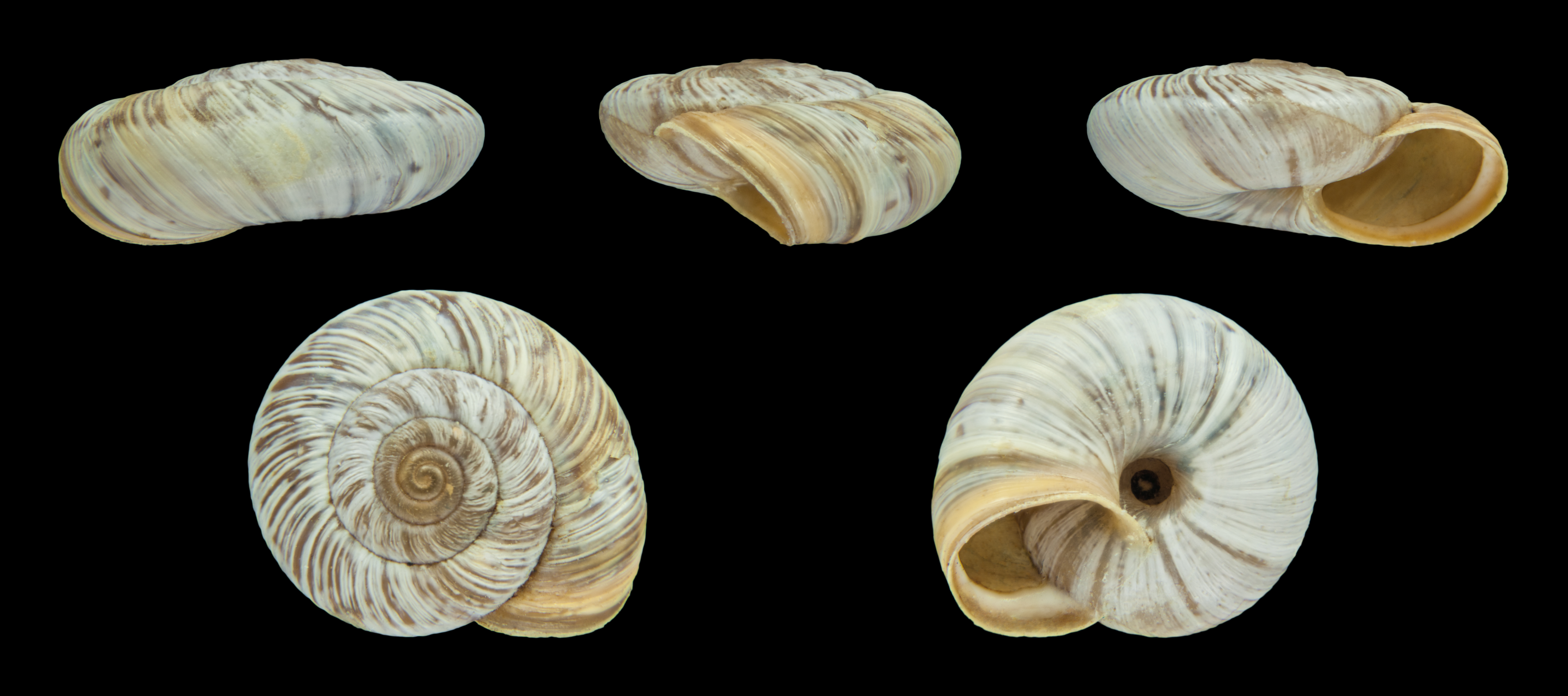
- Pyrenaearia cantabrica

Scientific classification
- Kingdom: Animalia
- Phylum: Mollusca
- Class: Gastropoda
- Order: Stylommatophora
- Infraorder: Helicoidei
- Superfamily: Helicoidea
- Family: Hygromiidae
- Genus: Pyrenaearia; Hesse, 1921

Synonyms
- Cantabricana Fagot, 1891 · unaccepted; Carascalensiana Fagot, 1885

= Pyrenaearia =

Genus of gastropods

Pyrenaearia is a genus of air-breathing land snails, terrestrial pulmonate gastropod mollusks or micromollusks in the subfamily Leptaxinae of the family Hygromiidae, the harry snails and their allies.

These snails live in limestone areas in the Pyrenees mountains of southwestern Europe.

== Species ==
Species in the genus Pyrenaearia:

- Pyrenaearia cantabrica (Hidalgo, 1873)
- Pyrenaearia carascalensis (Férussac, 1821) - type species
- Pyrenaearia carascalopsis (Bourguignat in Fagot, 1884)
- Pyrenaearia cotiellae (Fagot, 1906)
- Pyrenaearia daanidentata Raven, 1988
- Pyrenaearia guillenae Caro, Madeira & Gómez-Moliner, 2019
- Pyrenaearia molae Haas, 1924
- Pyrenaearia navasi (Fagot, 1907)
- Pyrenaearia organiaca (Fagot, 1905)
- Pyrenaearia parva Ortiz de Zárate, 1956

Synonyms

- Pyrenaearia oberthueri (Ancey, 1884): synonym of Pyrenaearia cantabrica (Hidalgo, 1873)
- Pyrenaearia poncebensis Ortiz de Zárate, 1956: synonym of Pyrenaearia cantabrica poncebensis Ortiz de Zárate López, 1956
- Pyrenaearia schaufussii (Kobelt, 1876): synonym of Pyrenaearia cantabrica schaufussi (Kobelt, 1876) (not assessed)
- Pyrenaearia velascoi (Hidalgo, 1867): synonym of Pyrenaearia carascalensis (Michaud, 1831)
