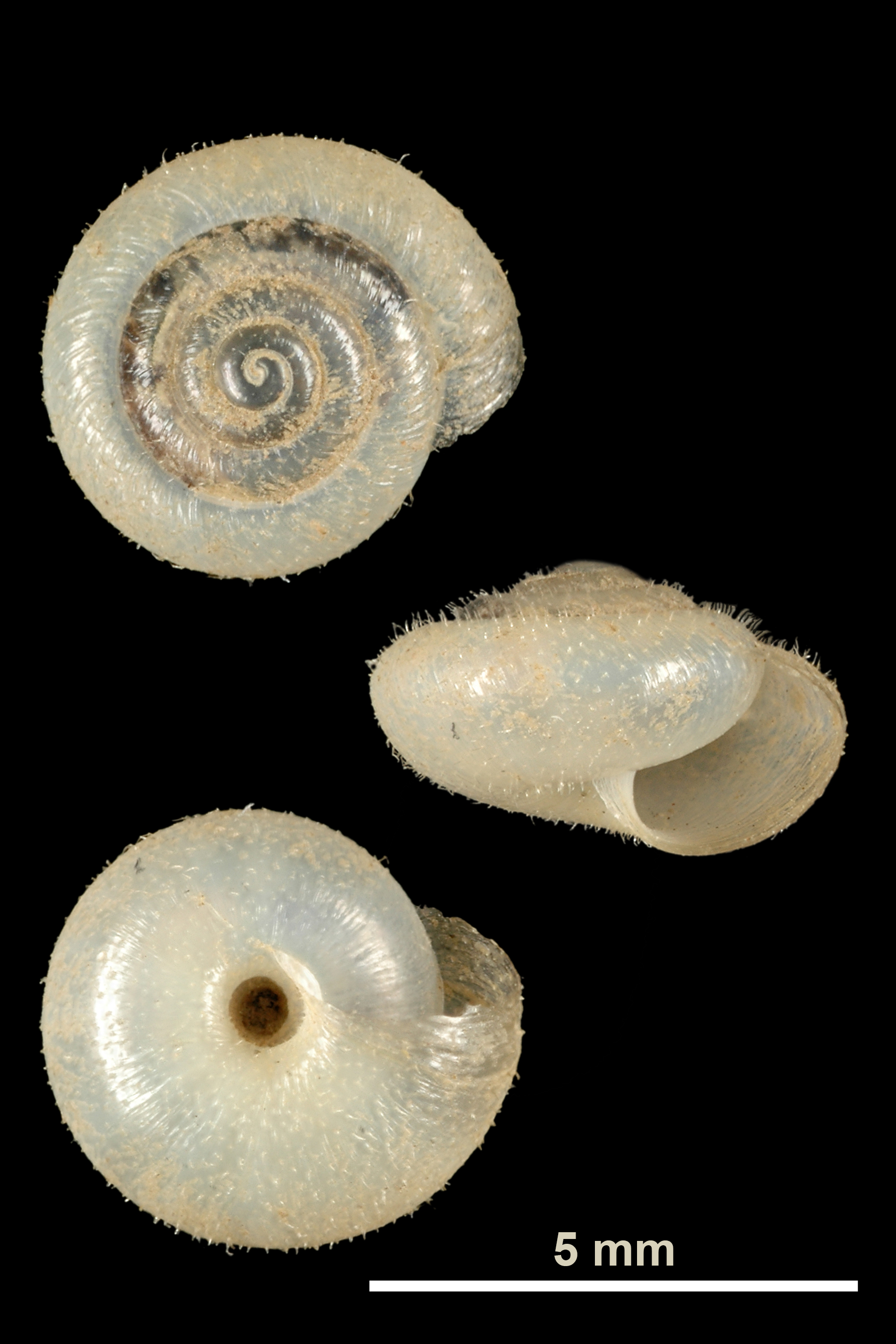
- Shell of Montserratina becasis (specimen at MNHN, Paris)

Scientific classification
- Kingdom: Animalia
- Phylum: Mollusca
- Class: Gastropoda
- Order: Stylommatophora
- Infraorder: Helicoidei
- Superfamily: Helicoidea
- Family: Canariellidae
- Genus: Montserratina; Ortiz de Zarate Lopez, 1946

= Montserratina =

Genus of gastropods

Montserratina is a genus of land snails in the family Canariellidae.

The snails are hairy and are endemic to north-eastern mountains in Spain. They are named after Montserrat mountain in Catalonia, Spain, one home of the snails. Their population is not known but is not considered to be at levels of endangerment. The habitats of these snails are in nature reserves within mountain ranges. The biggest threat to the snails is fire, which can burn down their habitats.

== Species ==
Species include:

- Monterratina becasis (Rambur, 1868)
- Montserratina bofilliana (Fagot, 1884)
- Montserratina martorelli (Bourguignat, 1870)
