= Pyrenaearia molae =

Conservation status
- Critically Endangered (IUCN 3.1)

Scientific classification
- Kingdom: Animalia
- Phylum: Mollusca
- Class: Gastropoda
- Order: Stylommatophora
- Family: Hygromiidae
- Genus: Pyrenaearia
- Species: P. molae

Binomial name
- Pyrenaearia molae Haas, 1924

Species of gastropod

Pyrenaearia molae is a species of small air-breathing land snail, a terrestrial pulmonate gastropod mollusk in the family Hygromiidae, the hairy snails and their allies. This species is endemic to Spain.
