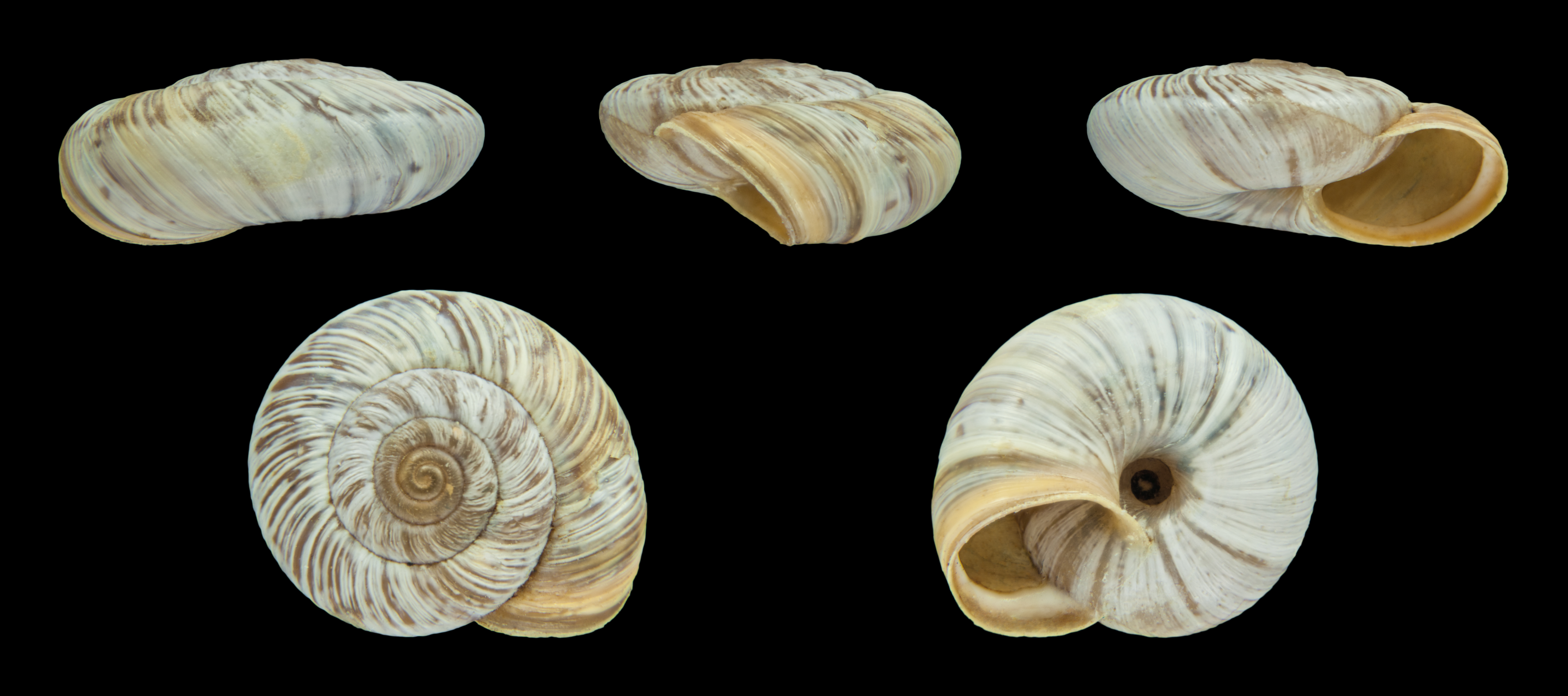

Conservation status
- Near Threatened (IUCN 2.3)

Scientific classification
- Kingdom: Animalia
- Phylum: Mollusca
- Class: Gastropoda
- Order: Stylommatophora
- Family: Hygromiidae
- Genus: Pyrenaearia
- Species: P. cantabrica

Binomial name
- Pyrenaearia cantabrica (Hidalgo, 1873)

Synonyms
- Pyrenaearia oberthueri (Ancey, 1884)

= Pyrenaearia cantabrica =

Species of gastropod

Pyrenaearia cantabrica is a species of small air-breathing land snail, a terrestrial pulmonate gastropod mollusc in the family Hygromiidae, the hairy snails and their allies.

Subspecies

- Pyrenaearia cantabrica cantabrica (Hidalgo, 1873)
- Pyrenaearia cantabrica covadongae (Ortiz de Zárate López, 1956)
- Pyrenaearia cantabrica poncebensis Ortiz de Zárate López, 1956
- Pyrenaearia cantabrica schaufussi (Kobelt, 1876)

This species is endemic to Spain.
