= Paul Fagot =

French malacologist (1842–1908)

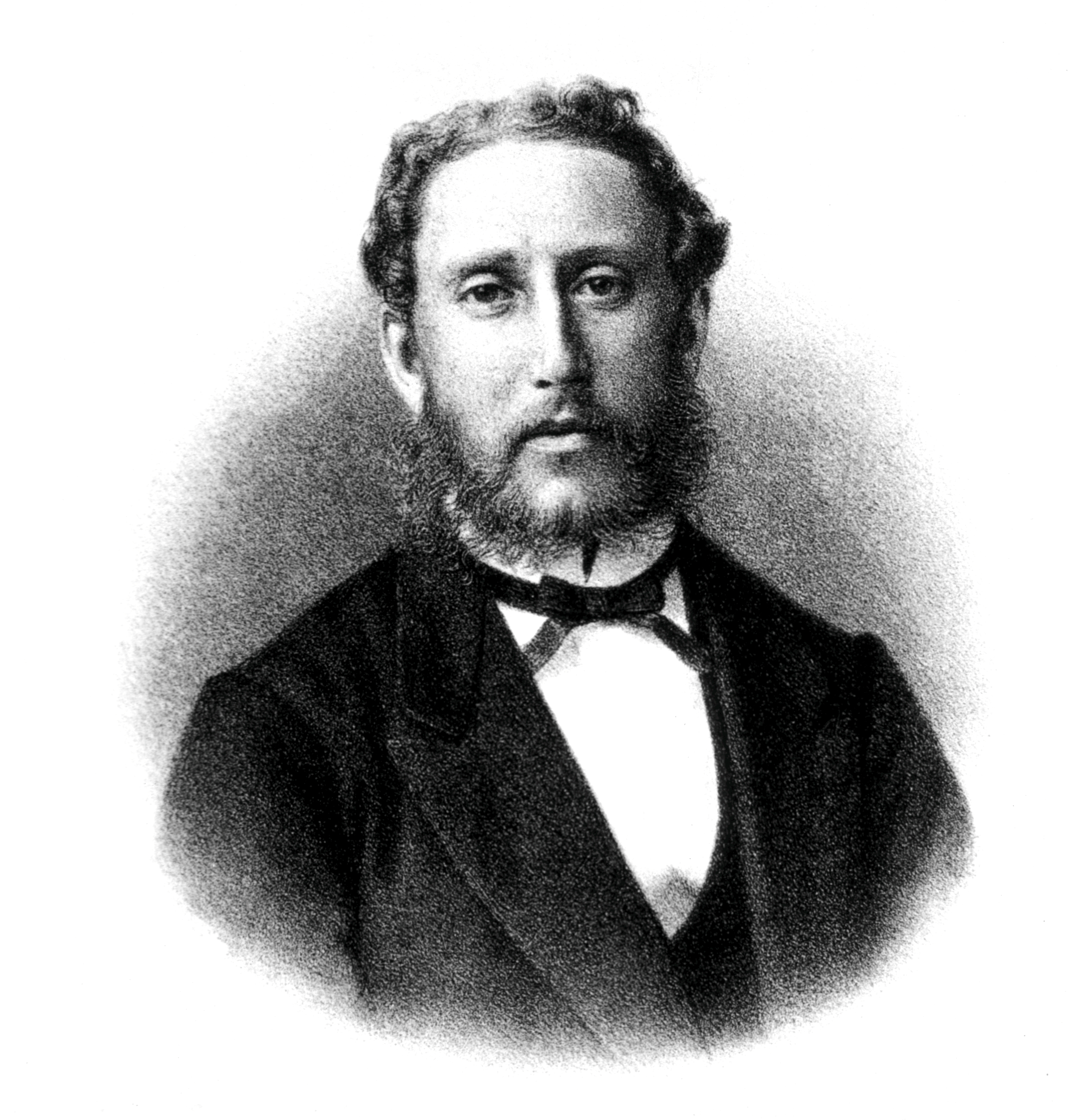

Jacques Sébastien François Léonce Marie Paul Fagot (1842, Villefranche-de-Lauragais –1908) was a French malacologist who often published under the name Paul Fagot.

== Life and career ==
Fagot was part of a "New School" of naturalists, which included Jules-René Bourguignat, Aristide-Horace Letourneux, Jules François Mabille, and Étienne Alexandre Arnould Locard. Species of land snails that were named and described by Fagot include Aegopinella epipedostoma, Pyrenaearia navasi, and Pyrenaearia cotiellae.
