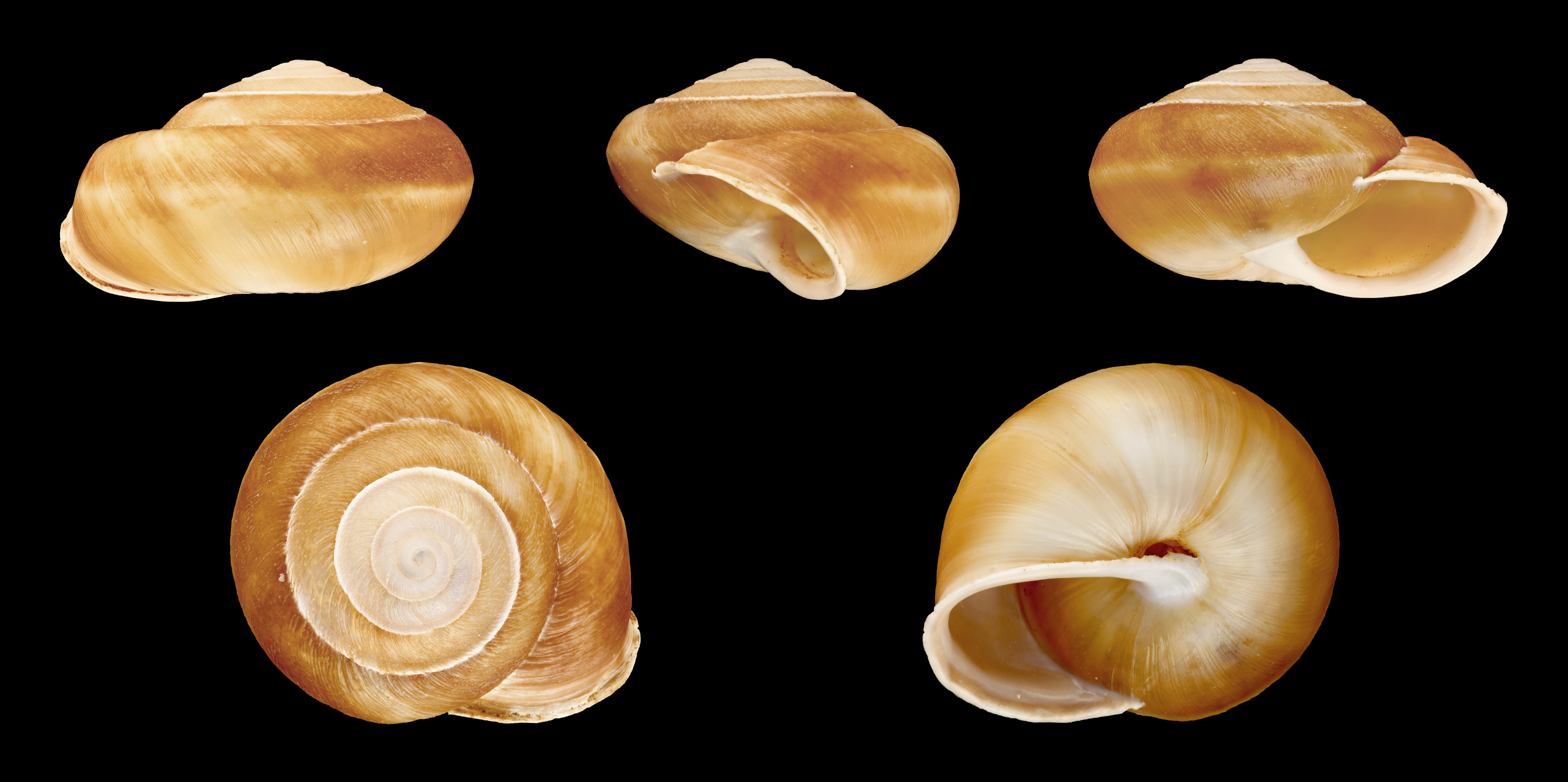
- A shell of Canariella plutonia

Scientific classification
- Kingdom: Animalia
- Phylum: Mollusca
- Class: Gastropoda
- Order: Stylommatophora
- Suborder: Helicina
- Infraorder: Helicoidei
- Superfamily: Helicoidea
- Family: Canariellidae; Iredale, 1915

Type genus
- Canariella P. Hesse, 1918

= Canariellidae =

Family of snails

Canariellidae is a taxonomic family of small to medium-sized air-breathing land snails, terrestrial pulmonate gastropod mollusks in the superfamily Helicoidea.

== Anatomy ==
The family is characterized by having a short flagellum and a stimulatory apparatus composed only of one to three single mucous glands (lacking dart or accessory sacs).

== Taxonomy ==
The family Canariellidae consists of:

- Canariella P. Hesse, 1918
- Debeauxhelix Bacci, 1943
- Montserratina Ortiz de Zarate Lopez, 1946
- Schileykiella Manganelli, Sparacio & Giusti, 1989
- Tyrrheniellina Giusti & Manganelli, 1992
