= László Ernő Pintér =

Hungarian Franciscan priest and malacologist

László Ernő Pintér (born 6 March 1942 in Sopron, Hungary; died 18 May 2002 in Vienna, Austria), better known as Pater Ernõ L. Pintér, was a Hungarian Franciscan priest and a malacologist (a person who studies mollusks).

== Education ==
Pintér first joined the Franciscan Order on 29 August 1960. After the noviciate, he joined the order officially on 30 August 1961. He did his theological studies at the Franciscan Theological College in Esztergom and was ordained on 27 November 1966. As a university student, he went to Pasarét in 1967, and in 1973 he received his diploma as a Latin and German language teacher at the Faculty of Arts of Eötvös Loránd University.

== Teaching ==
He travelled daily from Buda to teach at two Franciscan secondary grammar schools in Esztergom and Szentendre. He held various high offices in the Franciscan Order within the province from 1974 and was promoted to the highest office within the province in 1979. He continued teaching until his death in 2002.

== Malacological research ==
Pintér carried out a compilation and critical revision of the list of the Hungarian mollusc fauna. He also organized and launched a mapping scheme for the mollusk fauna of Hungary and described two Hungarian endemic gastropod species: Paladilhia oshanovae and Hygromia kovacsi (current name: Kovacsia kovacsi), which were discovered in the second half of the 20th century.

In addition to his work in Hungary, most of his collecting activity took place in the former Yugoslavia, Bulgaria, the Maltese Islands and Italy, where he discovered numerous new mollusk species. On these expeditions, he was a recognized expert on the genera Monacha and Vitrea. A number of new species in those two genera were described by him, and the description of species in other genera was carried out by his colleagues. The results of his scientific research were issued in more than one hundred publications, in Hungary and in other countries.

== Hungarian Natural History Museum ==
Between 1975 and 1998, Pintér was the curator of the mollusk collection of the Hungarian Natural History Museum, where he made his mark as a researcher and a museologist. With the products of his collecting activity which was carried out over more than two decades, the collection of the museum expanded to almost 14,000 items.

After some decades of decay up to 1956, the Museum’s mollusk collection became the repository of the most significant material that has so far originated from the Balkan peninsula. Pintér was the first researcher in the museum to recognize the importance of data processing and, starting in 1986, he began the process of computerizing the catalogues.

== Taxa named in his honor ==
Pintér László's name has been used in naming numerous newly described species. This is a sign of the respect and appreciation of his malacologist colleagues.

- Cochlostoma pinteri Fehér 2004 (genus Cochlostoma; Cochlostomatidae)
- Macedonica pinteri Sajó 1968 (genus Macedonica; Clausiliidae)
- Micridyla pinteri H. Nordsieck 1973 (genus Micridyla; Clausiliidae)
- Milax pinteri Wiktor 1975 (genus Milax; Milacidae)
- Montenegrina dofleini pinteri H. Nordsieck 1974 (genus Montenegrina; Clausiliidae)
- Pinteria croesus Varga 1972
- Platyla pinteri Subai 1976 (genus Platyla; Aciculidae)
- Radix pinteri Schütt 1974 (genus Radix; Lymnaeidae)
- Vitrea pinteri Riedel & Subai 1991 (genus Vitrea; Pristilomatidae)
- Vitrea ernesti Riedel & Subai 2004 (genus Vitrea; Pristilomatidae)
