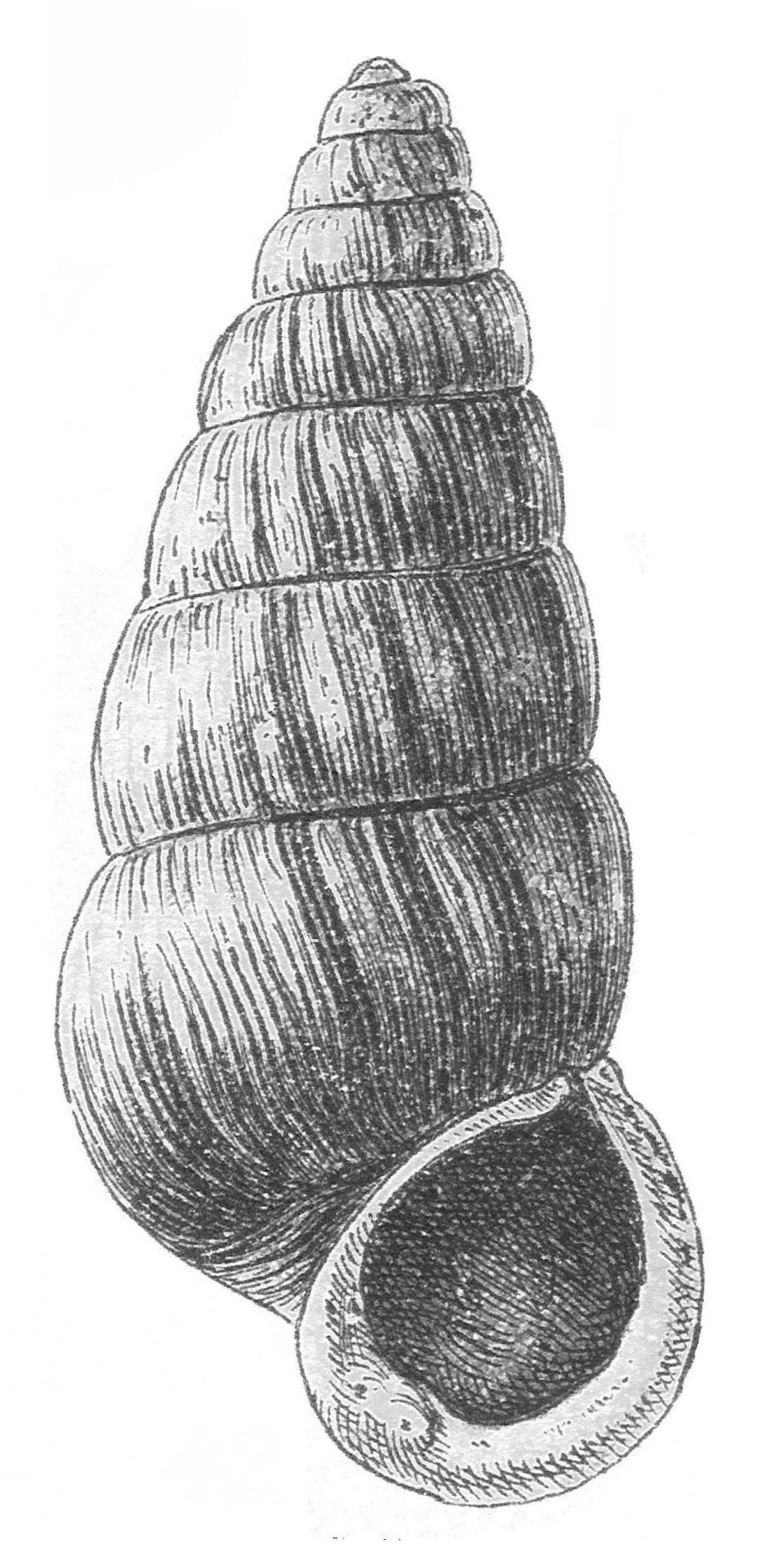
- Apertural view of a shell of Cochlostoma salomoni

Scientific classification
- Kingdom: Animalia
- Phylum: Mollusca
- Class: Gastropoda
- Subclass: Caenogastropoda
- Order: Architaenioglossa
- Family: Cochlostomatidae
- Genus: Cochlostoma
- Species: C. salomoni

Binomial name
- Cochlostoma salomoni Geyer, 1914

= Cochlostoma salomoni =

Extinct species of gastropod

Cochlostoma salomoni is an extinct species of land snail with an operculum, a terrestrial gastropod mollusk in the family Cochlostomatidae.
