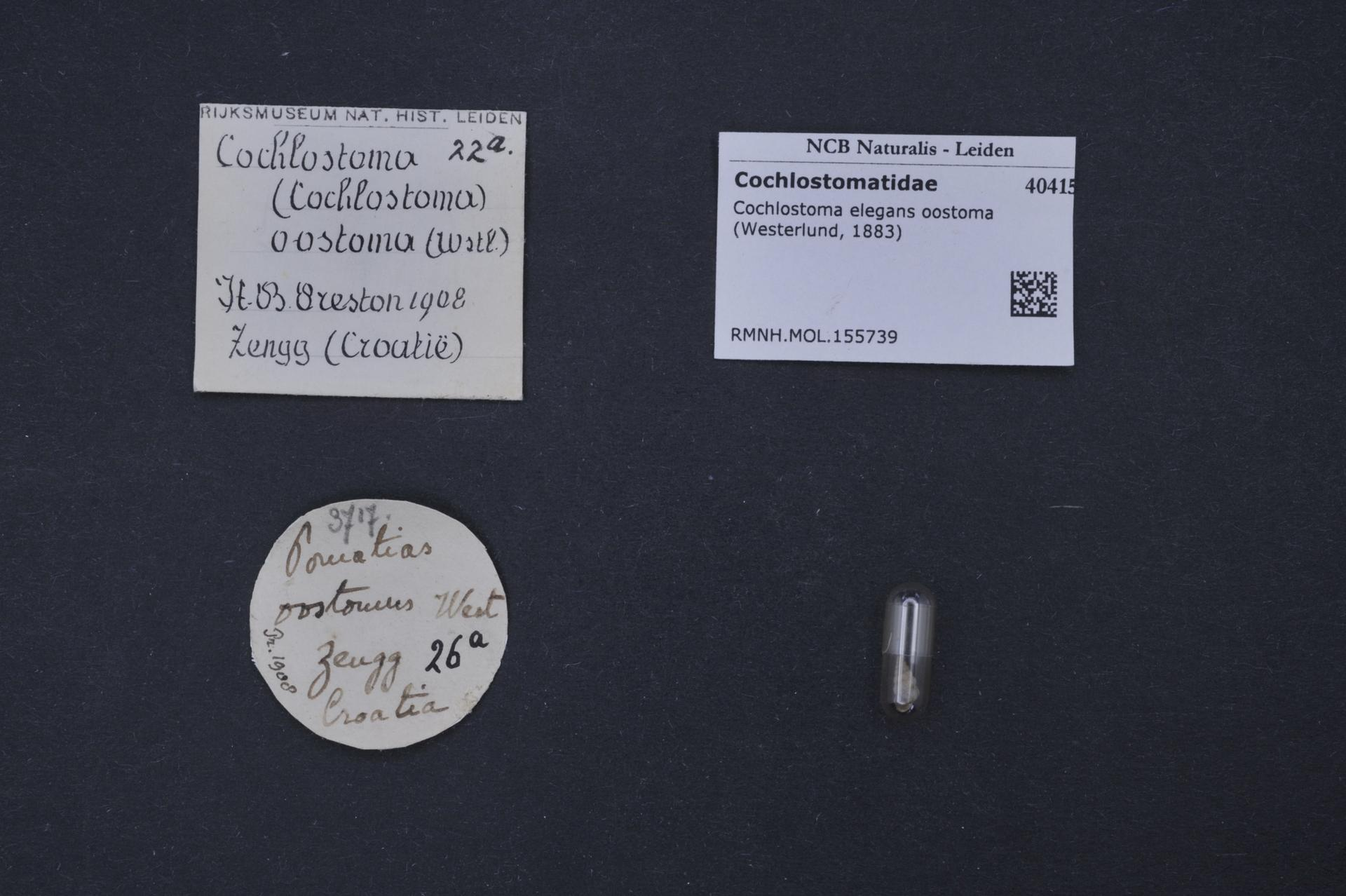
- Cochlostoma elegans oostoma (Westerlund, 1883)

Conservation status
- Least Concern (IUCN 3.1)

Scientific classification
- Kingdom: Animalia
- Phylum: Mollusca
- Class: Gastropoda
- Subclass: Caenogastropoda
- Order: Architaenioglossa
- Family: Cochlostomatidae
- Genus: Cochlostoma
- Species: C. elegans

Binomial name
- Cochlostoma elegans (Clessin, 1879)

= Cochlostoma elegans =

Species of gastropod

Cochlostoma elegans is a land snail species in the genus Cochlostoma. It is found on the island of Pag in Croatia.
