= Bythiospeum =

Scientific classification
- Kingdom: Animalia
- Phylum: Mollusca
- Class: Gastropoda
- Subclass: Caenogastropoda
- Order: Littorinimorpha
- Family: Moitessieriidae
- Genus: Bythiospeum; Bourguignat, 1882

Type species
- Paludina pellucida Seckendorf, 1846 Seckendorf, 1846

Synonyms
- Vitrella Clessin, 1877 (invalid: junior homonym of Vitrella Swainson, 1840; Bythiospeum is a replacement name)

Genus of gastropods

Bythiospeum is a genus of very small freshwater snails that have an operculum, aquatic gastropod mollusks in the family Moitessieriidae.

== Species ==
Species within the genus Bythiospeum include:

- Bythiospeum acicula (Hartmann, 1821)
- Bythiospeum alpinum Bernasconi, 1988
- Bythiospeum anglesianum (Westerlund, 1890)
- Bythiospeum articense Bernasconi, 1985
- Bythiospeum bechevi Georgiev & Glöer, 2013
- Bythiospeum blihense Glöer & Grego, 2015
- Bythiospeum bourguignati (Paladilhe, 1866)
- Bythiospeum bressanum Bernasconi, 1985
- Bythiospeum bureschi (A. J. Wagner, 1928)
- Bythiospeum cisterciensorum Reischütz, 1983
- Bythiospeum copiosum (Angelov, 1972)
- Bythiospeum demattiai Glöer & Pešić, 2014
- Bythiospeum devetakium Georgiev & Glöer, 2013
- Bythiospeum diaphanum (Michaud, 1831)
- Bythiospeum dourdeni Georgiev, 2012
- Bythiospeum elseri (Fuchs, 1929)
- Bythiospeum fernetense Girardi, 2009
- Bythiospeum garnieri Sayn, 1889
- Bythiospeum geyeri (Fuchs, 1925)
- Bythiospeum gloriae Rolán & Martínez-Ortí, 2003
- Bythiospeum hrustovoense Glöer & Grego, 2015
- Bythiospeum jazzi Georgiev & Glöer, 2013
- Bythiospeum juliae Georgiev & Glöer, 2015
- Bythiospeum klemmi (Boeters, 1969)
- Bythiospeum kolevi Georgiev, 2013
- Bythiospeum maroskoi Glöer & Grego, 2015
- Bythiospeum michaelleae Girardi, 2002
- Bythiospeum montbrunense Girardi & Bertrand, 2009
- Bythiospeum nemausense Callot-Girardi, 2012
- Bythiospeum noricum (Fuchs, 1929)
- Bythiospeum pandurskii Georgiev, 2012
- Bythiospeum pellucidum (Seckendorf, 1846)
- Bythiospeum petroedei Glöer & Grego, 2015
- Bythiospeum pfeifferi (Clessin, 1890)
- Bythiospeum plivense Glöer & Grego, 2015
- Bythiospeum quenstedti (Wiedersheim, 1873)
- Bythiospeum reisalpense (Reischütz, 1983)
- Bythiospeum sandbergeri (Flach, 1886)
- Bythiospeum sarriansense Girardi, 2009
- Bythiospeum simovi Georgiev, 2013
- † Bythiospeum steinheimensis (Gottschick, 1921)
- Bythiospeum stoyanovi Georgiev, 2013
- Bythiospeum tschapecki (Clessin, 1882)
- Bythiospeum valqueyrasense Girardi, 2015
- Bythiospeum wiaaiglica A. Reischütz & P. Reischütz, 2006

Species brought into synonymy

- Bythiospeum bogici Pešić & Glöer, 2012: synonym of Montenegrospeum bogici (Pešić & Glöer, 2012)
- Bythiospeum rasini Girardi, 2003: synonym of Meyrargueria rasini (Girardi, 2003)
- Bythiospeum schniebsae Georgiev, 2011: synonym of Balkanospeum schniebsae (Georgiev, 2011)
