= Cochlostoma achaicum =

Conservation status
- Least Concern (IUCN 3.1)

Scientific classification
- Kingdom: Animalia
- Phylum: Mollusca
- Class: Gastropoda
- Subclass: Caenogastropoda
- Order: Architaenioglossa
- Family: Cochlostomatidae
- Genus: Cochlostoma
- Species: C. achaicum

Binomial name
- Cochlostoma achaicum (Boettger, 1885)

Synonyms
- Pomatias achaicum Boettger, 1885; Pomatias tesselatus var. Achaica Boettger, 1885 (orig. spelling)

Species of gastropod

Cochlostoma achaicum is a species of small land snail with an operculum, a terrestrial gastropod mollusc in the family Cochlostomatidae.

== Geographic distribution ==
C. achaicum is endemic to Greece, where it occurs widely on the Peloponnese peninsula.
