= Hippolyt Tschapeck =

Austrian malacologist (1825-1897)

Hippolyt Tschapeck (4 October 1825, Vienna – 11 December 1897, Vienna) was an Austrian malacologist, known for his studies of mollusks native to Styria.

He studied in Nikolsburg and Brünn and at the University of Vienna, where he received his doctorate in 1848. He later became part of the military justice system, rising to the rank of hauptmann-auditor. In retirement he moved to Graz, then in 1887 returned to Vienna.

Earlier in his career he conducted investigations of Coleoptera (beetles), then around 1875 his primary focus turned to the field of malacology. Although he published nothing on Coleoptera, he provided some details for Karel Brančik's "Die Käfer der Steiermark" (1871). He was the author of numerous papers on mollusk fauna in the publication "Nachrichtenblatt der Deutschen Malakozoologischen Gesellschaft".

== Taxa ==
- Bythiospeum tschapecki, a freshwater snail, described by Stefan Clessin (1878).
- Euthiconus tschapecki, a scydmaenine, described by Félicien Henry Caignart de Saulcy (1878).
- Limax tschapecki, a land slug, described by Heinrich Simroth (1886).
- Pagodulina tschapecki, a land snail, described by Vinzenz Maria Gredler (1877).

== Bibliography ==
- 1876: Die Grenze zwischen Hei foetens und Hei. planospira. — Nachr.-Bl. dtsch. malak. Ges., 8.
- 1876: Campylea styriaca FRAUENF. — Nachr.-Bl. dtsch. malak. Ges., 8: 145-149.
- 1878: Obersteirische Succineen. — Nachr.-Bl. dtsch. malak. Ges., 10: 137-138.
- 1879: Styriaca. — Nachr.-Bl. dtsch. malak. Ges., 11: 8-11.
- 1880: Styriaca. —Jb. dtsch. malak. Ges., 7: 183-191.
- 1881: Einige Süßwasser-Mollusken des Sanngebietes in Untersteiermark. —Jb. dtsch. malak. Ges., 8.
- 1881: Kleine Notizen aus der Steiermark. — Nachr.-Bl. dtsch. malak. Ges., 13: 11-14.
- 1881: Eine neue Varietät vom Hum in Untersteiermark. — Nachr.-Bl. dtsch. malak. Ges., 13: 22-25.
- 1881: Von den steirischen Abhängen der Ursula. — Nachr.-Bl. dtsch. malak. Ges., 13: 69-74.
- 1882: Zur steirischen Clausilien-Fauna. — Nachr.-Bl. dtsch. malak. Ges., 14: 20-25.
- 1883: Formen der Clausilia dubia DRAP, in der Steiermark. — Nachr.-Bl. dtsch. malak. Ges., 15: 26-32.
- 1884: Aus dem Sommer 1883 in Steiermark. — Nachr.-Bl. dtsch. malak. Ges., 16: 17-21.
- 1885: Von der Tanneben bei Peggau in Steiermark. — Nachr.-Bl. dtsch. malak. Ges., 17: 7-22.
- 1885: Ein Melania-Nachtrag aus Steiermark. — Nachr.-Bl. dtsch. malak. Ges., 17: 82-84.
- 1886: Altes und Neues über Clausilia Grimmeri (PARR.) A. SCHM. — Nachr.-Bl. dtsch. malak. Ges., 18: 179-183.
- 1887: Von Grimming bis Altaussee. — Nachr.-Bl. dtsch. malak. Ges., 19: 65-82.
- 1890: Ueber das Auftreten der Alinda biplicata MTG. und ihres Formenkreises in Niederösterreich. — Nachr.-Bl. dtsch. malak. Ges., 22: 49-60.
