= Paladilhia hungarica =

Conservation status
- Near Threatened (IUCN 2.3)

Scientific classification
- Kingdom: Animalia
- Phylum: Mollusca
- Class: Gastropoda
- Subclass: Caenogastropoda
- Order: Littorinimorpha
- Family: Moitessieriidae
- Genus: Paladilhia
- Species: P. hungarica

Binomial name
- Paladilhia hungarica Soos, 1927

Species of gastropod

Paladilhia hungarica is a species of small freshwater snail, an aquatic gastropod mollusc in the family Moitessieriidae. This species is endemic to Hungary.

The shell is approximately 2 mm long with a diameter of 1 mm, with a glass-like shine. The shell becomes white when the animal dies. The species lives only in the Mecsek mountains, in two caves and in springs with clear karst water. Little is known about it, apart from being an omnivore. Its habitat is scattered and small.
