= Moitessieria lineolata =

Conservation status
- Near Threatened (IUCN 2.3)

Scientific classification
- Kingdom: Animalia
- Phylum: Mollusca
- Class: Gastropoda
- Subclass: Caenogastropoda
- Order: Littorinimorpha
- Family: Moitessieriidae
- Genus: Moitessieria
- Species: M. lineolata

Binomial name
- Moitessieria lineolata (Coutagne, 1882)

Species of gastropod

Moitessieria lineolata is a species of small freshwater snail with an operculum, an aquatic gastropod mollusc or micromollusc in the family Moitessieriidae. This species is endemic to France.
