= Bythiospeum geyeri =

Conservation status
- Vulnerable (IUCN 3.1)

Scientific classification
- Kingdom: Animalia
- Phylum: Mollusca
- Class: Gastropoda
- Subclass: Caenogastropoda
- Order: Littorinimorpha
- Family: Moitessieriidae
- Genus: Bythiospeum
- Species: B. geyeri

Binomial name
- Bythiospeum geyeri (Fuchs, 1925)

Synonyms
- Lartetia geyeri Fuchs, 1925; Paladilhia geyeri Fuchs, 1925

Species of gastropod

Bythiospeum geyeri is a species of very small freshwater snails that have an operculum, aquatic gastropod mollusks in the family Moitessieriidae.

The specific name geyeri is in honor of German zoologist David Geyer (1855-1932).

This species is endemic to Austria.
