= Paladilhia pleurotoma =

Conservation status
- Least Concern (IUCN 3.1)

Scientific classification
- Kingdom: Animalia
- Phylum: Mollusca
- Class: Gastropoda
- Subclass: Caenogastropoda
- Order: Littorinimorpha
- Family: Moitessieriidae
- Genus: Paladilhia
- Species: P. pleurotoma

Binomial name
- Paladilhia pleurotoma Bourguignat, 1865

Synonyms
- Paladilhia pontmartiniana (Nicolas, 1891)

Species of gastropod

Paladilhia pleurotoma is a species of freshwater snail in the family Moitessieriidae.

It is endemic to France. This snail lives in underground water bodies. It is not of immediate conservation concern but it could be threatened by water pollution and overexploitation of aquifers.
