= Bythiospeum elseri =

Conservation status
- Endangered (IUCN 3.1)

Scientific classification
- Kingdom: Animalia
- Phylum: Mollusca
- Class: Gastropoda
- Subclass: Caenogastropoda
- Order: Littorinimorpha
- Family: Moitessieriidae
- Genus: Bythiospeum
- Species: B. elseri

Binomial name
- Bythiospeum elseri (Fuchs, 1929)

Synonyms
- Paladilhia elseri Fuchs, 1929

Species of gastropod

Bythiospeum elseri is a species of very small freshwater snails that have an operculum, aquatic gastropod mollusks in the family Moitessieriidae.

This species is endemic to Austria.
