= Noricum (disambiguation) =

Noricum was an ancient Celtic kingdom, Noricum may also refer to:

- Province of Noricum, Imperial Roman Province
- Regnum Noricum, Celtic Kingdom
- Bythiospeum noricum, snail species
- Noricum scandal, an Austrian arms export scandal
- Noric Republic, a proposed name for Austria from 1919
- Noricum, a part of the surface of the asteroid 21 Lutetia
