= Iglica kleinzellensis =

Conservation status
- Vulnerable (IUCN 3.1)

Scientific classification
- Kingdom: Animalia
- Phylum: Mollusca
- Class: Gastropoda
- Subclass: Caenogastropoda
- Order: Littorinimorpha
- Family: Moitessieriidae
- Genus: Iglica
- Species: I. kleinzellensis

Binomial name
- Iglica kleinzellensis Reischütz, 1981

Species of gastropod

Iglica kleinzellensis is a species of very small or minute freshwater snail with an operculum, an aquatic gastropod mollusc in the family Moitessieriidae. This species is endemic to Austria.
