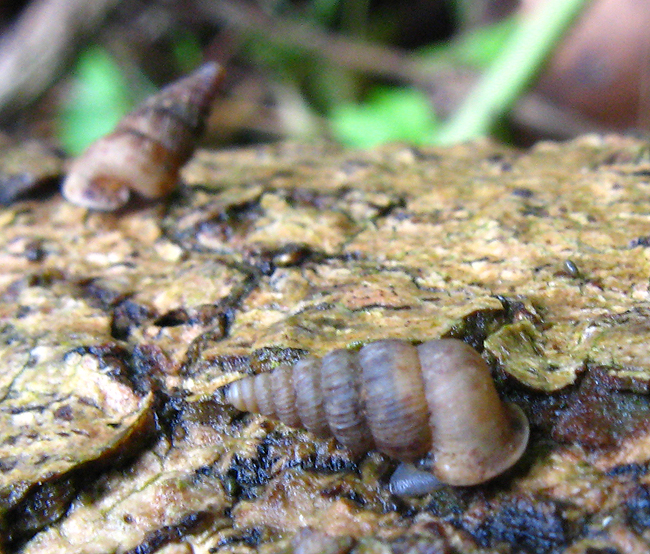
- Two live individuals of Cochlostoma septemspirale in France

Conservation status
- Least Concern (IUCN 3.1)

Scientific classification
- Kingdom: Animalia
- Phylum: Mollusca
- Class: Gastropoda
- Subclass: Caenogastropoda
- Order: Architaenioglossa
- Family: Cochlostomatidae
- Genus: Cochlostoma
- Species: C. septemspirale

Binomial name
- Cochlostoma septemspirale (Razoumowsky, 1789)

Synonyms
- Helix Septem Spiralis Razoumowsky, 1789; Cyclostoma maculatum Draparnaud, 1805

= Cochlostoma septemspirale =

Species of gastropod

Cochlostoma septemspirale is a species of a land snail with an operculum, a terrestrial gastropod mollusk in the family Cochlostomatidae.

== Distribution ==
The distribution of Cochlostoma septemspirale is southern Europe from the Pyrenees to south Germany and the central Balkans.

Cochlostoma septemspirale is the most widely distributed Cochlostoma species.

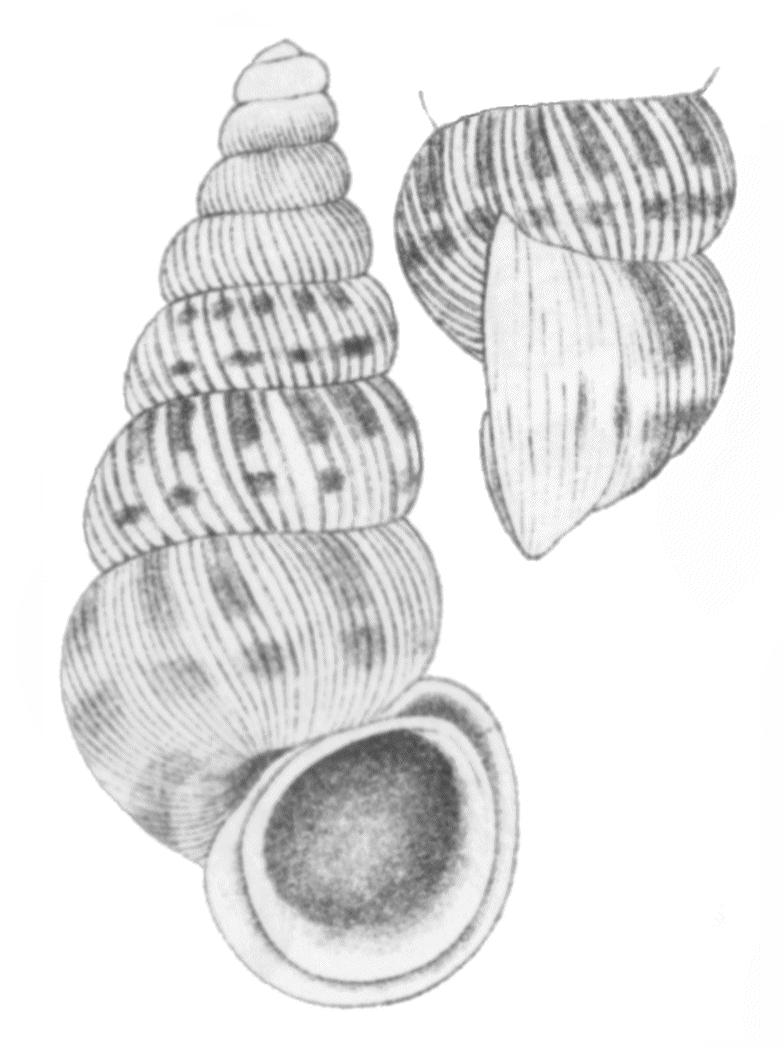
Drawings of a shell of Cochlostoma septemspirale

== Description ==
The shell is light greyish brown with 3 rows of reddish brown spots. It has 6-8 regular ribs/mm and 7-10 convex whorls. The aperture is inside whitish. There is no significant sexual dimorphism on the shell.

The width of the shell is 3.2-4.4 mm. The height of the shell is 6.7-10.2 mm.

The animal is medium-sized (5–6.5 mm long), greyish with weak brownish hue.

== Ecology ==
Cochlostoma septemspirale lives in forest habitats, rocks, rock rubble, walls and grassy slopes, up to 2100 m.

It feeds on disintegrating plant substrate, sometimes also on the algae film growing on limestone.

The animal is slow, not very active, and very shy. However the animal will emerge when put onto a cold object. It is active only in wet weather, and the operculum is closed when the soil is dry. This snail climbs trees up to 2 m during very wet weather conditions. It hibernates between stones, under leaves and grasses; activity seems to cease when temperatures go below 6-7 °C.

Eggs (diameter 1.0-1.1 mm, occasionally down to 0.6 mm) are laid from April to October, mainly during May to June, about 1 cm below the surface. The eggs are covered by the female with faeces and mucus. They are laid in clutches of up to 10 eggs. Juveniles hatch after 45–60 days, and the full adult shell size is reached after roughly 1 year.
