= Iglica gratulabunda =

Conservation status
- Critically Endangered (IUCN 3.1)

Scientific classification
- Kingdom: Animalia
- Phylum: Mollusca
- Class: Gastropoda
- Subclass: Caenogastropoda
- Order: Littorinimorpha
- Family: Moitessieriidae
- Genus: Iglica
- Species: I. gratulabunda

Binomial name
- Iglica gratulabunda (A. J. Wagner, 1910)

Species of mollusc

Iglica gratulabunda is a species of very small freshwater snail with a gill and an operculum, an aquatic gastropod mollusc in the family Moitessieriidae. This species is endemic to Austria. It is probably found in subterranean freshwater habitat, but is known only from floodline debris.
