= Bythiospeum klemmi =

Conservation status
- Endangered (IUCN 3.1)

Scientific classification
- Kingdom: Animalia
- Phylum: Mollusca
- Class: Gastropoda
- Subclass: Caenogastropoda
- Order: Littorinimorpha
- Family: Moitessieriidae
- Genus: Bythiospeum
- Species: B. klemmi

Binomial name
- Bythiospeum klemmi (Boeters, 1969)

Species of gastropod

Bythiospeum klemmi is a species of small brackish water snail with an operculum, an aquatic gastropod mollusk in the family Moitessieriidae.

== Distribution ==
This species is endemic to France.
