= László Pintér =

László Pintér may refer to:

- László Pintér (politician)
- László Ernő Pintér, Hungarian Franciscan priest and malacologist
