= Palacanthilhiopsis vervierii =

Conservation status
- Vulnerable (IUCN 3.1)

Scientific classification
- Kingdom: Animalia
- Phylum: Mollusca
- Class: Gastropoda
- Subclass: Caenogastropoda
- Order: Littorinimorpha
- Family: Hydrobiidae
- Genus: Palacanthilhiopsis
- Species: P. vervierii

Binomial name
- Palacanthilhiopsis vervierii Bernasconi, 1988

Species of gastropod

Palacanthilhiopsis vervierii is a species of very small or minute freshwater snail with an operculum, an aquatic gastropod mollusk in the family Moitessieriidae.

This species is endemic to France.
