= Cochlostoma parnonis =

Conservation status
- Near Threatened (IUCN 3.1)

Scientific classification
- Kingdom: Animalia
- Phylum: Mollusca
- Class: Gastropoda
- Subclass: Caenogastropoda
- Order: Architaenioglossa
- Superfamily: Cyclophoroidea
- Family: Cochlostomatidae
- Genus: Cochlostoma
- Species: C. parnonis

Binomial name
- Cochlostoma parnonis Schütt, 1981

Synonyms
- Cochlostoma achaicum parnonis Schütt, 1981

Species of gastropod

Cochlostoma parnonis is a species of small land snail with an operculum, a terrestrial gastropod mollusc in the family Cochlostomatidae.

== Geographic distribution ==
C. parnonis is endemic to Greece, where it occurs in the south-eastern part of the Peloponnese peninsula.
