= Bythiospeum gloriae =

Scientific classification
- Kingdom: Animalia
- Phylum: Mollusca
- Class: Gastropoda
- Subclass: Caenogastropoda
- Order: Littorinimorpha
- Family: Moitessieriidae
- Genus: Bythiospeum
- Species: B. gloriae

Binomial name
- Bythiospeum gloriae Rolán & Martínez-Ortí, 2003

Species of gastropod

Bythiospeum gloriae is a species of very small aquatic snail, an operculate gastropod mollusc in the family Moitessieriidae.
