= Bythiospeum tschapecki =

Conservation status
- Critically Endangered (IUCN 3.1)

Scientific classification
- Kingdom: Animalia
- Phylum: Mollusca
- Class: Gastropoda
- Subclass: Caenogastropoda
- Order: Littorinimorpha
- Family: Moitessieriidae
- Genus: Bythiospeum
- Species: B. tschapecki

Binomial name
- Bythiospeum tschapecki (Clessin, 1882)

Synonyms
- Paladilhia tschapecki (Clessin, 1878); Vitrella tschapecki Clessin, 1878

Species of gastropod

Bythiospeum tschapecki is a species of very small freshwater snails that have an operculum, aquatic gastropod mollusks in the family Moitessieriidae.

This species is endemic to Austria, and commemorates Hippolyt Tschapeck (1825–1897), an Austrian malacologist.
