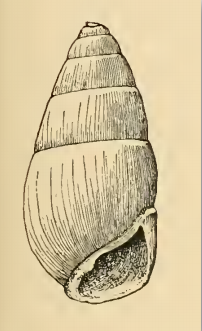
- Apertural view of the shell of Odostomia panamensis

Scientific classification
- Kingdom: Animalia
- Phylum: Mollusca
- Class: Gastropoda
- Family: Pyramidellidae
- Genus: Odostomia
- Species: O. panamensis

Binomial name
- Odostomia panamensis Clessin, 1900

Synonyms
- Odostomia (Heida) panamensis Clessin, 1900

= Odostomia panamensis =

Species of gastropod

Odostomia panamensis is a species of sea snail, a marine gastropod mollusc in the family Pyramidellidae, the pyrams and their allies.

== Description ==
The milk-white, shining shell is small and measures 3.1 mm. It is heavy, elongate-ovate. Its whorls increase regularly in size. The whorls of the protoconch are small, almost completely obliquely immersed in the first of the succeeding volutions. The six whorls of the teleoconch are moderately and evenly rounded, of porcellanous texture, without any apparent marking, and separated by well marked sutures. The periphery of the body whorl is full and rounded. The base of the shell is inflated and well rounded. The aperture is small, decidedly rissoid, almost channeled anteriorly. The posterior angle is acute. The outer is lip decidedly curved backward anteriorly, very thick within but beveled to form a sharp edge. The columella is extremely short, somewhat reflected and connected posteriorly with the very strong parietal callus. This callus is fully as thick as the edge of the outer lip and connects with it at the posterior angle of the aperture, thus forming a complete periostracum. A prominent oblique fold is present on and a little anterior to the insertion of the columella.

== Distribution ==
This species occurs in the Pacific Ocean off the west coast of Panama.
