= Turbonilla brasiliensis =

Scientific classification
- Kingdom: Animalia
- Phylum: Mollusca
- Class: Gastropoda
- Family: Pyramidellidae
- Genus: Turbonilla
- Species: T. brasiliensis

Binomial name
- Turbonilla brasiliensis Clessin, 1902

Synonyms
- Turbonilla interrupta auct. non Totten, 1835; Turbonilla iheringi Clessin, 1900; Turbonilla clessini Ihering, 1907

Species of gastropod

Turbonilla brasiliensis is a species of sea snail, a marine gastropod mollusk in the family Pyramidellidae, the pyrams and their allies.

== Description ==
The shell grows to a length of 9.5 mm.

== Distribution ==
This species occurs in the Atlantic Ocean off Brazil at depths between 48 m and 56 m.
