= Sardopaladilhia buccina =

Scientific classification
- Kingdom: Animalia
- Phylum: Mollusca
- Class: Gastropoda
- Subclass: Caenogastropoda
- Order: Littorinimorpha
- Family: Moitessieriidae
- Genus: Sardopaladilhia
- Species: S. buccina

Binomial name
- Sardopaladilhia buccina Rolán & Martínez-Ortí, 2003

Species of gastropod

Sardopaladilhia buccina is a species of very small aquatic snail, an operculate gastropod mollusc in the family Moitessieriidae.

== Distribution ==
This species occurs in the Atlantic Ocean off Spain and Portugal.
