= Cochlostoma pageti =

Conservation status
- Least Concern (IUCN 3.1)

Scientific classification
- Kingdom: Animalia
- Phylum: Mollusca
- Class: Gastropoda
- Subclass: Caenogastropoda
- Order: Architaenioglossa
- Superfamily: Cyclophoroidea
- Family: Cochlostomatidae
- Genus: Cochlostoma
- Species: C. pageti

Binomial name
- Cochlostoma pageti Klemm, 1962

Species of gastropod

Cochlostoma pageti is a species of small land snail with an operculum, a terrestrial gastropod mollusc in the family Cochlostomatidae.

== Geographic distribution ==
Cochlostoma pageti is endemic to Greece, where it occurs in the region of Epirus in the north-western part of the country.
