= Bythiospeum alpinum =

Conservation status
- Near Threatened (IUCN 3.1)

Scientific classification
- Kingdom: Animalia
- Phylum: Mollusca
- Class: Gastropoda
- Subclass: Caenogastropoda
- Order: Littorinimorpha
- Family: Moitessieriidae
- Genus: Bythiospeum
- Species: B. alpinum

Binomial name
- Bythiospeum alpinum Bernasconi, 1988

Species of gastropod

Bythiospeum alpinum is a species of very small freshwater snail that has an operculum, an aquatic gastropod mollusk in the family Moitessieriidae. It is only known from two locations in central Switzerland, where it is endemic. It is listed under Swiss law. This minute groundwater snail has a translucent, elongated shell averaging 2.8 mm in length and is distinguished from other European Bythiospeum species by its distinctive female reproductive anatomy, specifically the unusually positioned female reproductive pouch. As a specialized stygobiont, B. alpinum spends its entire life cycle submerged in the cold, oxygen-rich groundwater of karst aquifers, making it particularly vulnerable to changes in water quality and flow patterns.

== Description ==
Bythiospeum alpinum is a minute groundwater snail with an elongated, almost conical shell that averages 2.8 mm long and 1.3 mm wide (length-to-width ratio approximately 2.2). The thin, glassy shell bears about five gently convex whorls; the last whorl occupies roughly half the total height, and the narrow umbilical slit is barely visible. The oval aperture measures close to 1.0 × 0.7 mm, and the horny operculum is discoid and tightly coiled, its length a little under one quarter of the shell's. Internally, the species is set apart from all other European Bythiospeum by a distinctive female reproductive pouch (bursa copulatrix) that is long, folded and attached off-centre—rather than at the tip—of the duct leading to the oviduct. Males possess a simple, cone-shaped penis that rarely shows lobes. The radula follows the typical hydrobioid 1–(10–12)–1 tooth formula.

== Distribution and habitat ==
The species is so far known only from the karstic resurgence spring at Hohlbühl near Interlaken, draining the extensive Schrattenfluh–Sieben Hengste–Hohgant limestone massif that straddles the cantons of Lucerne and Bern. These springs represent the exit points of an underground river system where the snails live permanently submerged in cold, oxygen-rich groundwater. A morphologically matching population from Wallgau in the Bavarian Alps has been reported, but requires further study to confirm conspecificity. Because the entire biological life cycle unfolds below ground, B. alpinum is regarded as a specialised stygobiont—a creature restricted to groundwater habitats—and is likely vulnerable to any disturbance that alters the quality or flow of Alpine karst aquifers.

== See also ==
- List of non-marine molluscs of Switzerland
