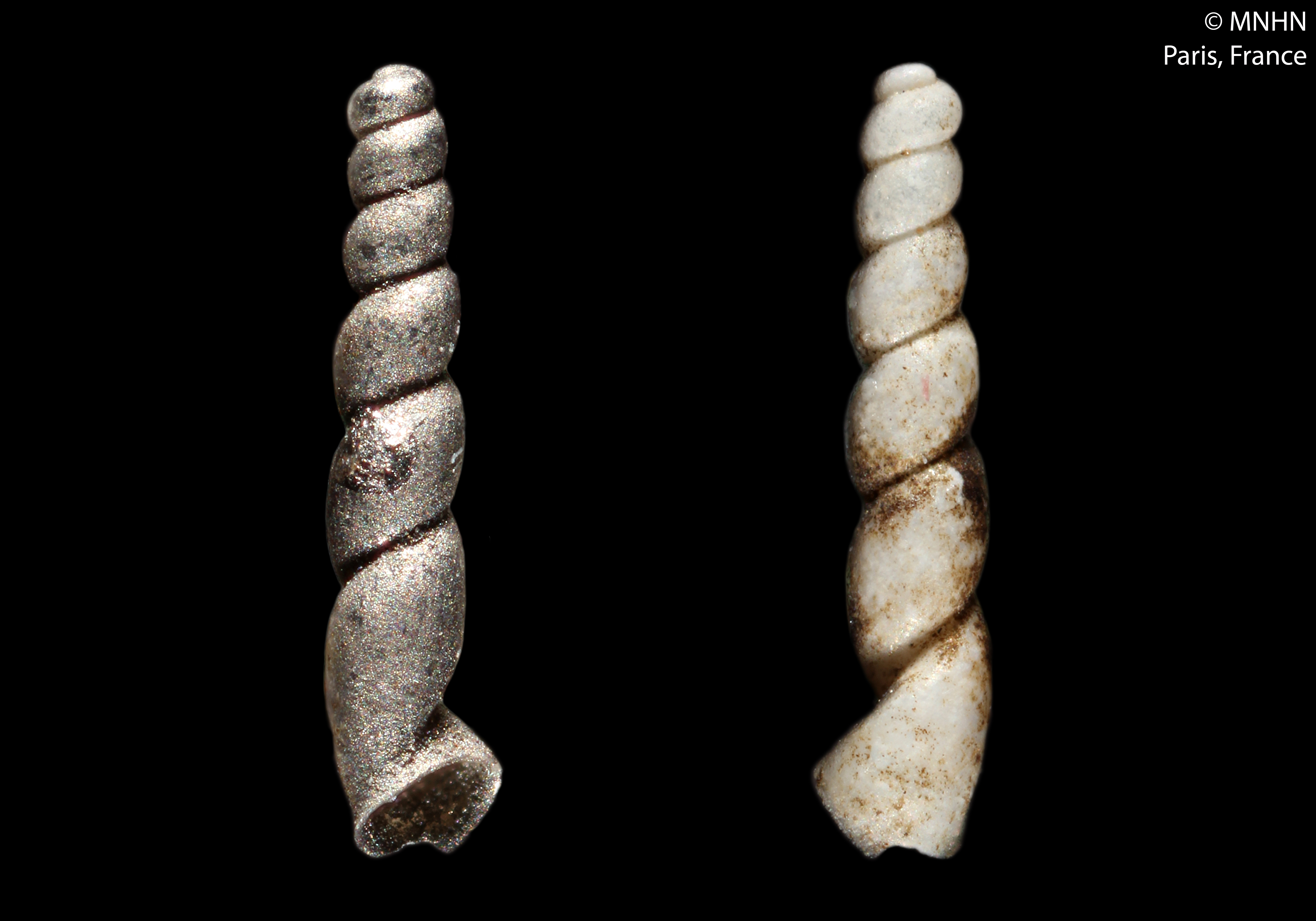

Conservation status
- Critically Endangered (IUCN 3.1)

Scientific classification
- Domain: Eukaryota
- Kingdom: Animalia
- Phylum: Mollusca
- Class: Gastropoda
- Subclass: Caenogastropoda
- Order: Littorinimorpha
- Family: Moitessieriidae
- Genus: Iglica
- Species: I. soussensis

Binomial name
- Iglica soussensis Ghamizi & Boulal, 2017

= Iglica soussensis =

Species of gastropod

Iglica soussensis is a species of aquatic subterranean gastropod endemic to wells in the Souss Plain, Morocco. I. soussensis is only known from the type locality, a well in the Ait Msia village in the area of Agadir, or described by the IUCN as 'a well at Tamait Izder south of the Souss River north of Temsia, Morocco'. This species is a stygobiont, being restricted to aquatic subterranean habitats

== Description and taxonomic affinities ==
Shell is high-spired and turriform, with enlarged sutures, elliptic aperture disjunct with simple peristome. Shell is 2.1 mm tall, 0.4 mm wide, 0.4 mm in aperture height, and 0.16 mm in aperture width. With the exception of Iglica seyadi, the only endemic Moroccan species of this genus, no other Iglica is found in the region. In addition, I. seyadi is morphologically closer to Heideella. The closest species to Iglica soussensis is I. tellinii, however specimens differ in several aspects.
