= Cochlostoma hellenicum =

Conservation status
- Least Concern (IUCN 3.1)

Scientific classification
- Kingdom: Animalia
- Phylum: Mollusca
- Class: Gastropoda
- Subclass: Caenogastropoda
- Order: Architaenioglossa
- Family: Cochlostomatidae
- Genus: Cochlostoma
- Species: C. hellenicum

Binomial name
- Cochlostoma hellenicum (Saint-Simon, 1869)

Synonyms
- Pomatias Hellenicus Saint-Simon, 1869 (orig. spelling)

Species of gastropod

Cochlostoma hellenicum is a species of a small land snail with an operculum, a terrestrial gastropod mollusc in the family Cochlostomatidae.

== Taxonomy ==
Fauna Europaea recognises two subspecies, the nominotypical C. h. subsp. hellenicum and C. h. subsp. athenarum.

== Geographic distribution ==
C. hellenicum is endemic to Greece, where it occurs in the central part of the country and the islands of Tinos, Evvia, and Xeronisi.
