= Moitessieria juvenisanguis =

Conservation status
- Vulnerable (IUCN 3.1)

Scientific classification
- Kingdom: Animalia
- Phylum: Mollusca
- Class: Gastropoda
- Subclass: Caenogastropoda
- Order: Littorinimorpha
- Family: Moitessieriidae
- Genus: Moitessieria
- Species: M. juvenisanguis

Binomial name
- Moitessieria juvenisanguis Boeters & Guittenberger, 1980

Species of gastropod

Moitessieria juvenisanguis is a species of small freshwater snail with an operculum, an aquatic gastropod mollusc or micromollusc in the family Moitessieriidae. The species is endemic to France.
