= Plagigeyeria tribunicae =

Conservation status
- Critically Endangered (IUCN 2.3)

Scientific classification
- Kingdom: Animalia
- Phylum: Mollusca
- Class: Gastropoda
- Subclass: Caenogastropoda
- Order: Littorinimorpha
- Family: Moitessieriidae
- Genus: Plagigeyeria
- Species: P. tribunicae

Binomial name
- Plagigeyeria tribunicae (Schütt, 1963)

Species of gastropod

Plagigeyeria tribunicae is a species of freshwater gastropod belonging to the family Moitessieriidae.

== Distribution ==
This species is endemic to a cave-spring in Bosnia-Herzegovina. The species was initially collected in the cave Dejanova pećina in Bileća, East Herzegovina, which is now entirely submerged by a man-made basin (Bileća Lake).
