= Bythiospeum garnieri =

Conservation status
- Least Concern (IUCN 3.1)

Scientific classification
- Kingdom: Animalia
- Phylum: Mollusca
- Class: Gastropoda
- Subclass: Caenogastropoda
- Order: Littorinimorpha
- Family: Moitessieriidae
- Genus: Bythiospeum
- Species: B. garnieri

Binomial name
- Bythiospeum garnieri (Sayn, 1889)

Synonyms
- Bythiospeum fagoti Sayn, 1889; Bythiospeum subcylindrica Sayn, 1889

Species of gastropod

Bythiospeum garnieri is a species of very small freshwater snails that have an operculum, aquatic gastropod molluscs in the family Moitessieriidae.

This species is endemic to France.
