= Bythiospeum bourguignati =

Conservation status
- Least Concern (IUCN 3.1)

Scientific classification
- Kingdom: Animalia
- Phylum: Mollusca
- Class: Gastropoda
- Subclass: Caenogastropoda
- Order: Littorinimorpha
- Family: Moitessieriidae
- Genus: Bythiospeum
- Species: B. bourguignati

Binomial name
- Bythiospeum bourguignati (Paladilhe, 1866)

Synonyms
- Paladilhiopis bourguignati Paladilhe, 1866

Species of gastropod

Bythiospeum bourguignati is a species of very small freshwater snail that have an operculum, aquatic gastropod mollusks in the family Moitessieriidae.

This species is endemic to France.
