= Moitessieria locardi =

Conservation status
- Least Concern (IUCN 3.1)

Scientific classification
- Kingdom: Animalia
- Phylum: Mollusca
- Class: Gastropoda
- Subclass: Caenogastropoda
- Order: Littorinimorpha
- Family: Moitessieriidae
- Genus: Moitessieria
- Species: M. locardi

Binomial name
- Moitessieria locardi Bourguignat, 1863

Species of gastropod

Moitessieria locardi is a species of freshwater snail in the family Moitessieriidae. It is endemic to France, where it lives in underground water bodies. It is a protected species that could be threatened by water pollution and overexploitation of aquifers.
