= Moitessieria rolandiana =

Conservation status
- Least Concern (IUCN 3.1)

Scientific classification
- Kingdom: Animalia
- Phylum: Mollusca
- Class: Gastropoda
- Subclass: Caenogastropoda
- Order: Littorinimorpha
- Family: Moitessieriidae
- Genus: Moitessieria
- Species: M. rolandiana

Binomial name
- Moitessieria rolandiana (Bourguignat, 1863)

Species of gastropod

Moitessieria rolandiana is a species of small freshwater snail with an operculum, an aquatic gastropod mollusc or micromollusc in the family Moitessieriidae. This species is endemic to France.
