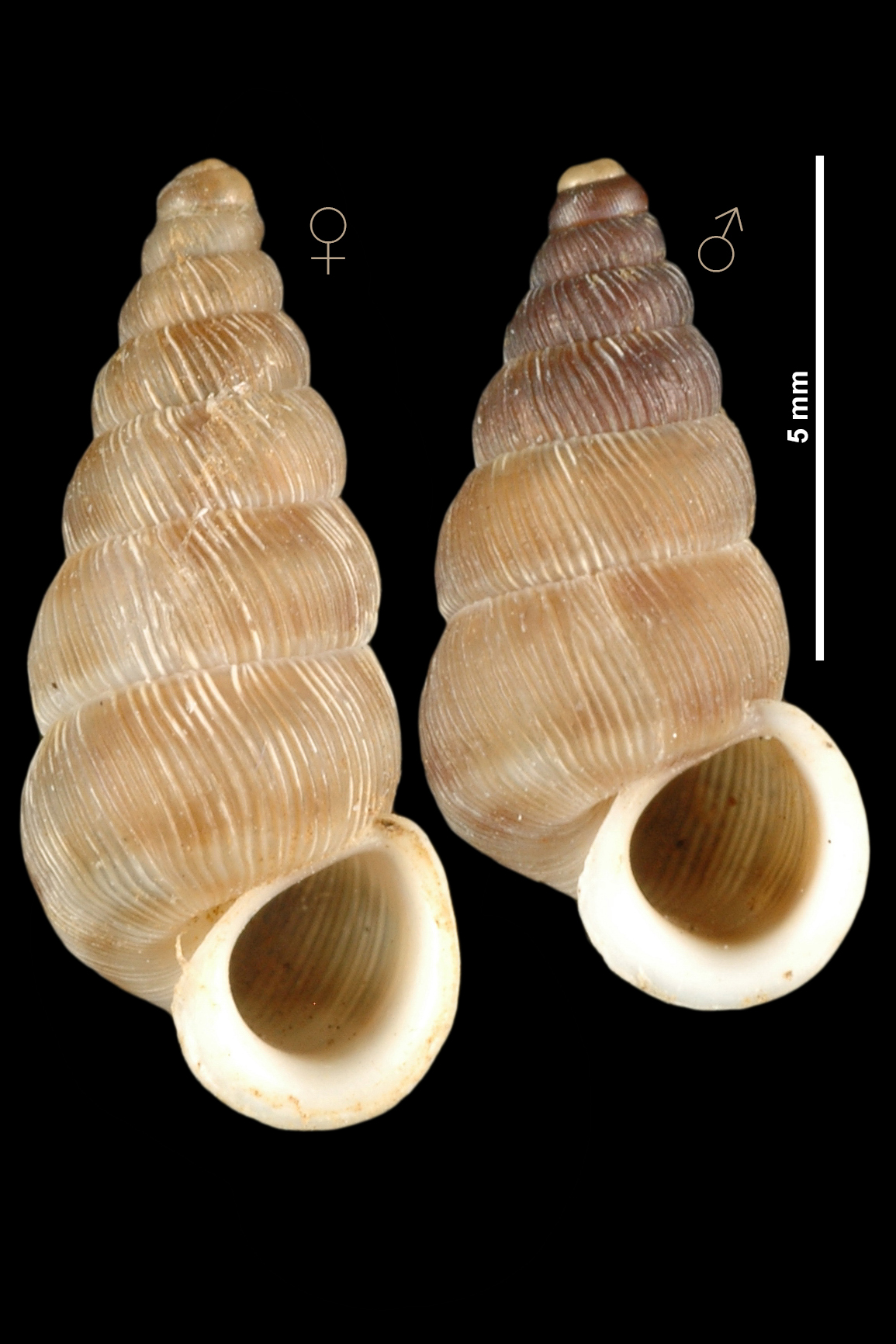
- Shell of Obscurella aprica (specimen at MNHN, Paris)

Scientific classification
- Kingdom: Animalia
- Phylum: Mollusca
- Class: Gastropoda
- Subclass: Caenogastropoda
- Order: Architaenioglossa
- Superfamily: Cyclophoroidea
- Family: Cochlostomatidae
- Genus: Obscurella; Clessin, 1889

Type species
- Cyclostoma apricum Mousson, 1847

Synonyms
- Apricana Caziot, 1908; Cochlostoma (Obscurella) Clessin, 1889; Crassilabriana Fagot, 1891; Hidalgoiana Fagot, 1891; Neglectiana Fagot, 1891; Nouletiana Fagot, 1891; Obscurella (Cantabrica) Raven, 1990; Obscuriana Fagot, 1891; Partiotiana Fagot, 1891; Pomatias (Anotus) Westerlund, 1883; Pomatias (Obscura) A. J. Wagner, 1897; Pomatias (Obscurella) Clessin, 1889 (original rank)

= Obscurella =

Genus of gastropods

Obscurella is a genus of land snails with an operculum, terrestrial gastropod mollusks in the family Cochlostomatidae.

== Description ==
(Original description in German) The shell is larger and cone-shaped. Its whorls appear slightly convex and spotted. The outer lip presents a narrow form, is never doubled, and feels thickened.

== Species ==
- Obscurella aprica (Mousson, 1847)
- Obscurella asturica (Raven, 1990)
- Obscurella bicostulata Gofas, 1989
- † Obscurella buxovillana (Wenz, 1923)
- † Obscurella cieuracensis (Noulet, 1868)
- Obscurella conica (Vallot, 1801)
- † Obscurella crassicosta (F. Sandberger, 1870)
- Obscurella crassilabrum (Dupuy, 1849)
- Obscurella filholi (Filhol, 1877)
- Obscurella gigas Gofas & Backeljau, 1994
- † Obscurella heterostoma (F. E. Edwards, 1852)
- Obscurella hidalgoi (Crosse, 1864)
- † Obscurella lamellosa (F. Sandberger, 1871)
- † Obscurella lugdunensis (Delafond & Depéret, 1893)
- Obscurella marocana (Pallary, 1928)
- Obscurella martorelli (Servain, 1880)
- † Obscurella mirifica (Cossmann, 1899)
- Obscurella nouleti (Dupuy, 1851)
- Obscurella obscura (Draparnaud, 1805)
- Obscurella oscitans Gofas, 1989
- Obscurella partioti (Saint-Simon, 1848)
- † Obscurella prisca (Wenz, 1930)
- † Obscurella ressonii (de Raincourt, 1876)
- † Obscurella sandbergeri (Noulet, 1868)

Synonyms

- † Obscurella lamellosea [sic]: synonym of † Obscurella lamellosa (F. Sandberger, 1871) (incorrect subsequent spelling)
- † Obscurella ressoni [sic]: synonym of † Obscurella ressonii (de Raincourt, 1876) (incorrect subsequent spelling)

== External linkjs ==
- Media related to Obscurella at Wikimedia Commons
- Clessin, S. (1887-1890). Die Mollusken-Fauna Mitteleuropa's. II. Teil. Die Molluskenfauna Oesterreich-Ungarns und der Schweiz, 858 pp. [part 1: 1-160 (1887); part 2: 161-320 (1887); part 3: 321-480 (1888); part 4: 481-624 (1889); part 5: 625-858 (1890)]. Nürnberg (Bauer & Raspe)
- Wagner, A. J. (1897). Monographie der Gattung Pomatias Studer. Denkschriften der Kaiserlichen Akademie der Wissenschaften, mathematisch-naturwissenschaftliche Classe. 64: 565-632, pls 1-10. Wien
- Westerlund, C. A. (1883). Malakologische Miscellen. Jahrbücher der Deutschen Malakozoologischen Gesellschaft. 10 (1): 51-72, Frankfurt am Main
