= Cochlostoma euboicum =

Conservation status
- Near Threatened (IUCN 3.1)

Scientific classification
- Kingdom: Animalia
- Phylum: Mollusca
- Class: Gastropoda
- Subclass: Caenogastropoda
- Order: Architaenioglossa
- Family: Cochlostomatidae
- Genus: Cochlostoma
- Species: C. euboicum

Binomial name
- Cochlostoma euboicum (Westerlund, 1885)

Synonyms
- Pomatias (Auritus) banaticus var. euboicus Westerlund, 1885 (orig. spelling); Pomatias certus Westerlund, 1892

Species of gastropod

Cochlostoma euboicum is a species of small land snail with an operculum, a terrestrial gastropod mollusc in the family Cochlostomatidae.

== Geographic distribution ==
C. euboicum is endemic to Greece, where it occurs on the island of Evia.
