= Bythiospeum pfeifferi =

Conservation status
- Critically Endangered (IUCN 3.1)

Scientific classification
- Kingdom: Animalia
- Phylum: Mollusca
- Class: Gastropoda
- Subclass: Caenogastropoda
- Order: Littorinimorpha
- Family: Moitessieriidae
- Genus: Bythiospeum
- Species: B. pfeifferi

Binomial name
- Bythiospeum pfeifferi (Clessin, 1890)

Synonyms
- Paladilhia pfeifferi Clessin, 1890; Vitrella pfeifferi Clessin, 1890

Species of gastropod

Bythiospeum pfeifferi is a species of very small freshwater snail that has an operculum, an aquatic gastropod mollusk in the family Moitessieriidae.

== Distribution ==
This species is endemic to Austria.
