= Plagigeyeria conilis =

Conservation status
- Vulnerable (IUCN 2.3)

Scientific classification
- Kingdom: Animalia
- Phylum: Mollusca
- Class: Gastropoda
- Subclass: Caenogastropoda
- Order: Littorinimorpha
- Family: Moitessieriidae
- Genus: Plagigeyeria
- Species: P. conilis

Binomial name
- Plagigeyeria conilis (Boeters, 1974)

Species of gastropod

Plagigeyeria conilis is a species of very small or minute freshwater snail with an operculum, an aquatic gastropod mollusk in the family Moitessieriidae. This species is endemic to France.
