= Bythiospeum cisterciensorum =

Conservation status
- Critically Endangered (IUCN 3.1)

Scientific classification
- Kingdom: Animalia
- Phylum: Mollusca
- Class: Gastropoda
- Subclass: Caenogastropoda
- Order: Littorinimorpha
- Family: Moitessieriidae
- Genus: Bythiospeum
- Species: B. cisterciensorum

Binomial name
- Bythiospeum cisterciensorum Reischütz, 1983

Species of gastropod

Bythiospeum cisterciensorum is a species of very small freshwater snails that have an operculum, aquatic gastropod mollusks in the family Moitessieriidae.

This species is endemic to Austria.
