= Plagigeyeria =

Scientific classification
- Kingdom: Animalia
- Phylum: Mollusca
- Class: Gastropoda
- Subclass: Caenogastropoda
- Order: Littorinimorpha
- Family: Moitessieriidae
- Genus: Plagigeyeria; Tomlin, 1930

Synonyms
- Geyeria A. J. Wagner, 1914 (invalid: junior homonym of Geyeria Buchecker, 1876; Plagigeyeria is a replacement name)

Genus of gastropods

Plagigeyeria is a genus of very small or minute freshwater snails with an operculum, aquatic gastropod mollusks in the family Moitessieriidae.

== Species ==
Species within the genus Plagigeyeria include:

- Plagigeyeria conilis
- Plagigeyeria deformata Nicolas, 1891
- Plagigeyeria edlaueri Schütt, 1961
- Plagigeyeria feheri Grego & Glöer, 2019
- Plagigeyeria gladilini Kuščer, 1937
- Plagigeyeria horatieformis (Starobogatov, 1962)
- Plagigeyeria jalzici Cindrić & Slapnik, 2019
- Plagigeyeria klemmi Schütt, 1961
- Plagigeyeria lukai Glöer & Pešić, 2014
- Plagigeyeria minuta Bole & Velkovrh, 1987
- Plagigeyeria montenigrina Bole, 1961
- Plagigeyeria mostarensis Kuščer, 1933
- Plagigeyeria necopinata A. Reischütz, Steiner-Reischütz & P.L. Reischütz, 2018
- Plagigeyeria nitida Schütt, 1963
- Plagigeyeria piroti Bole & Velkovrh, 1987
- Plagigeyeria plagiostoma A.J. Wagner, 1914
- Plagigeyeria procerula Angelov, 1965
- Plagigeyeria robusta Schütt, 1959
- Plagigeyeria steffeki Grego, Glöer, Erőss & Fehér, 2017
- Plagigeyeria tribunicae Schütt, 1963
- Plagigeyeria valvataeformis (Starobogatov, 1962)
- Plagigeyeria zetaprotogona Schütt, 1960

Species brought into synonymy

- Plagigeyeria pageti Schütt, 1961: synonym of Plagigeyeria zetaprotogona pageti Schütt, 1961 (original combination)
