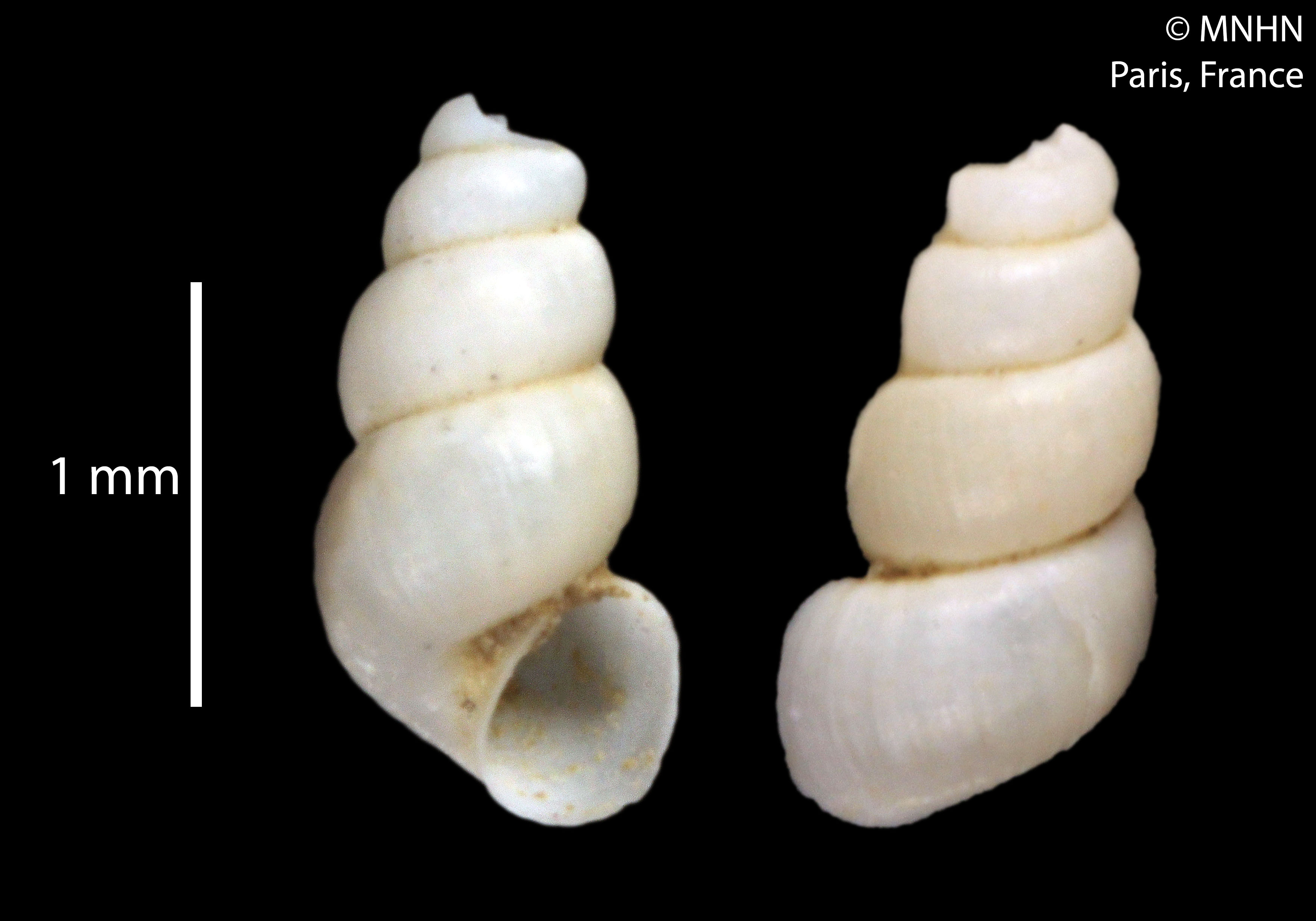
- Shell of Palaospeum septentrionale (paratype at MNHN, Paris)

Scientific classification
- Kingdom: Animalia
- Phylum: Mollusca
- Class: Gastropoda
- Subclass: Caenogastropoda
- Order: Littorinimorpha
- Superfamily: Truncatelloidea
- Family: Moitessieriidae
- Genus: Palaospeum; Boeters, 1999

Type species
- Paladilhia bessoni R. Bernasconi, 1999

= Palaospeum =

Genus of gastropods

Palaospeum is a genus of minute freshwater snails with an operculum, aquatic gastropod molluscs or micromolluscs in the family Moitessieriidae.

== Species ==
- Palaospeum bertrandi Girardi, 2009
- Palaospeum bessoni (R. Bernasconi, 1999)
- Palaospeum hispanicum Boeters, 2003
- Palaospeum lopezsorianoi Quiñonero-Salgado & Rolán, 2017
- Palaospeum nanum Boeters & Bertrand, 2001
- Palaospeum septentrionale (Rolán & Ramos, 1996)
