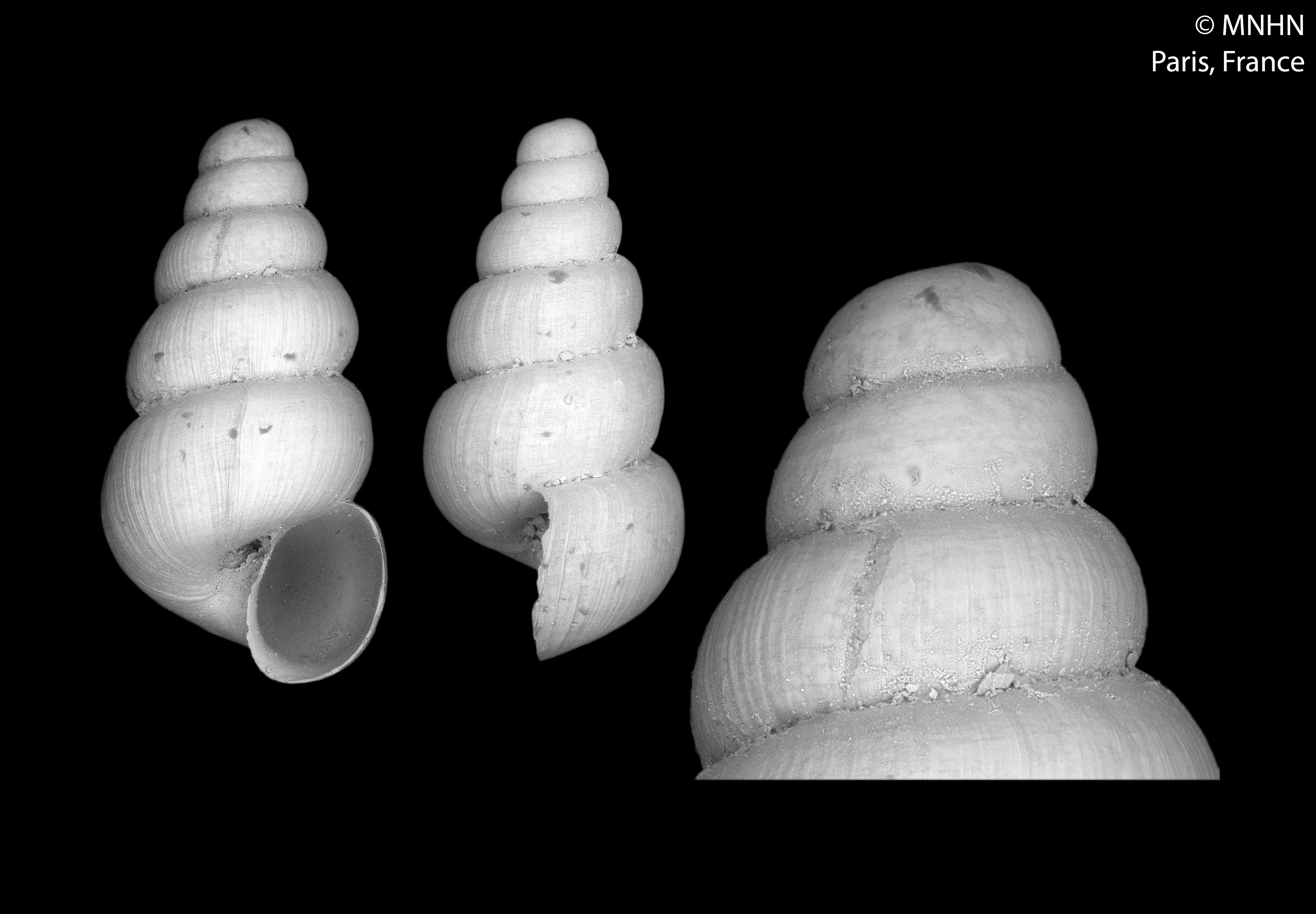
- Shell of Paladilhia castaneaensis (holotype at MNHN, Paris)

Scientific classification
- Kingdom: Animalia
- Phylum: Mollusca
- Class: Gastropoda
- Subclass: Caenogastropoda
- Order: Littorinimorpha
- Superfamily: Truncatelloidea
- Family: Moitessieriidae
- Genus: Paladilhia; Bourguignat, 1865

Type species
- Paladilhia pleurotoma Bourguignat, 1865

Synonyms
- † Paladilhia (Lartetella) Cossmann, 1921 · accepted, alternate representation; † Paladilhia (Liaohenia) Youluo, 1978· accepted, alternate representation

= Paladilhia =

Genus of gastropods

Paladilhia is a genus of minute freshwater snails with an operculum, aquatic gastropod molluscs or micromolluscs in the family Moitessieriidae.

== Species ==
Species within the genus Paladilhia include:

- Paladilhia bourguignati Locard, 1883
- Paladilhia castaneaensis Girardi, 2015
- Paladilhia conica Paladilhe, 1867
- Paladilhia coutalensis Girardi, 2015
- Paladilhia gloeeri Boeters & Falkner, 2003
- Paladilhia hungarica Soos, 1927
- Paladilhia jamblussensis Bertrand, 2004
- † Paladilhia liaoheensis Youluo, 1978
- Paladilhia moitessieri Bourguignat, 1865
- Paladilhia pleurotoma Bourguignat, 1865
- † Paladilhia plicistriaCossmann, 1888)
- Paladilhia roselloi Girardi, 2004
- † Paladilhia sinensis Youluo, 1978
- Paladilhia subconica Girardi, 2009
- Paladilhia umbilicata (Locard, 1902)
- Paladilhia vernierensis Girardi, 2009
- Paladilhia yunnanensis Liu, Wang & Zhang, 1980

Species brought into synonymy

- Paladilhia bessoni Bernasconi, 1999: synonym of Palaospeum bessoni (Bernasconi, 1999)
- Paladilhia bourguignati Paladilhe, 1866: synonym of Bythiospeum bourguignati (Paladilhe, 1866) (original combination)
- Paladilhia carpathica L. Soós, 1940: synonym of Paladilhiopsis carpathica (L. Soós, 1940) (basionym)
- Paladilhia oshanovae L. Pintér, 1968: synonym of Bythiospeum oshanovae (L. Pintér, 1968) (original combination)
- Paladilhia pontmartiniana (Nicolas, 1891): synonym of Paladilhia pleurotoma Bourguignat, 1865
- Paladilhia robiciana Clessin, 1882: synonym of Paladilhiopsis robiciana (Clessin, 1882)
- Paladilhia vobarnensis Pezzoli & Toffoletto, 1968: synonym of Iglica vobarnensis (Pezzoli & Toffoletto, 1968) (basionym)
