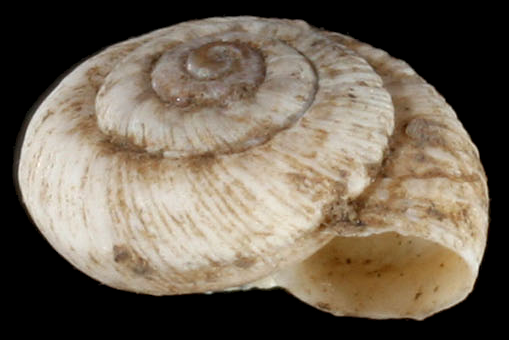
- Shell

Conservation status
- Data Deficient (IUCN 3.1)

Scientific classification
- Kingdom: Animalia
- Phylum: Mollusca
- Class: Gastropoda
- Order: Stylommatophora
- Family: Geomitridae
- Genus: Xerocrassa
- Species: X. geyeri

Binomial name
- Xerocrassa geyeri (Soós, 1926)

Synonyms
- List: Helix arceuthophila J. Mabille, 1881; Helix ycaunica J. Mabille, 1881; Helix vicianica Bourguignat in Locard, 1882; Helix deana Berthier, 1884; Helix pleurestha Berthier, 1884; Helix (Xerophila) striata Geyer, 1896 (part.); 1909; Xerophila geyeri Soós, 1926; Helicella geyeri (Soós, 1926); Trochoidea (Xeroclausa) geyeri (Soós, 1926); Trochoidea geyeri; Helix llopisi Gasull, 1981; Trochoidea (Xerocrassa) llopisi Gasull, 1981

= Xerocrassa geyeri =

Xerocrassa geyeri Temporal range: early Pleistocene–Recent

Species of gastropod

Xerocrassa geyeri is a species of air-breathing land snail, a terrestrial pulmonate gastropod mollusk in the family Geomitridae. It is also known as Trochoidea geyeri.

== Taxonomy ==
Xerocrassa geyeri was originally described under the name Xerophila geyeri by the Hungarian malacologist Lajos Soós (1879-1972) in 1926. The specific name geyeri is in honor of the German zoologist David Geyer (1855-1932). The type specimens are stored in the Natural History Museum of Geneva.

== Shell description ==
Xerocrassa geyeri is a small land snail. The height of the shell is 3.4-6.0 mm, usually 3.5–5 mm. The width of the shell is 5.1(5.0)-8.0 mm.

The shell is globular in its shape. The shell has 4.5-5 whorls. Sometimes there are radial ribs on the surface of the shell forming its shell sculpture. There are usually no periostracal structures, but there can in some cases be hairs and in these cases, after the hairs are gone pits remain on the shel surface especially on the whorl below the apex. The color of the shell is greyish-white sometimes with one or a few brownish spiral bands.

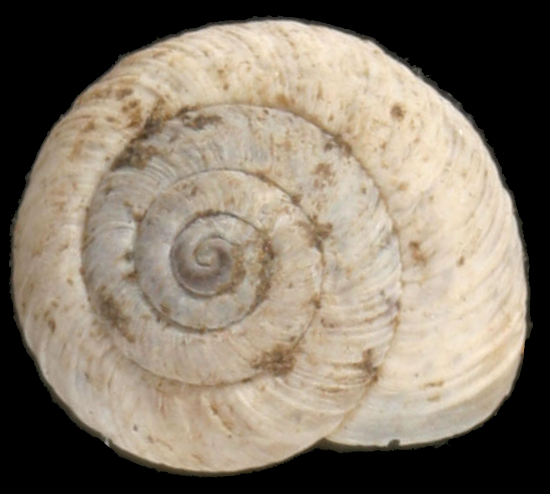
apical view

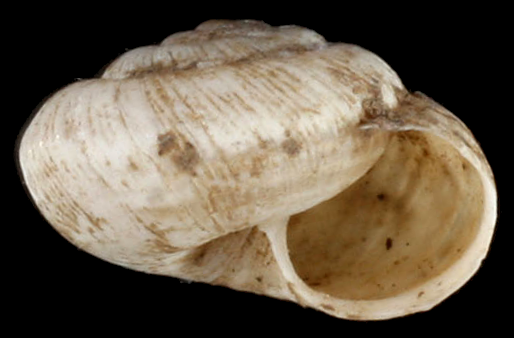
apertural view.

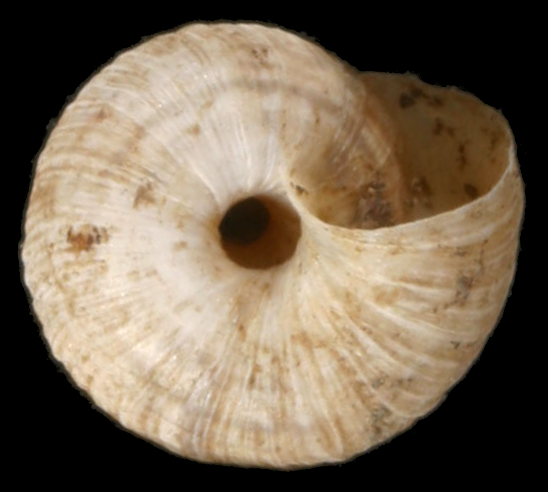
umbilical view

== Anatomy ==
The reproductive system of Xerocrassa geyeri was described by Gittenberger (1993): there is no appendage in the genital atrium, that is the distinguishing characteristic of the genus Xerocrassa Monterosato, 1892. There are two rudimentary dart-sacs near the mucous glands. The flagellum and the epiphallus have approximately the same length.

== Distribution ==
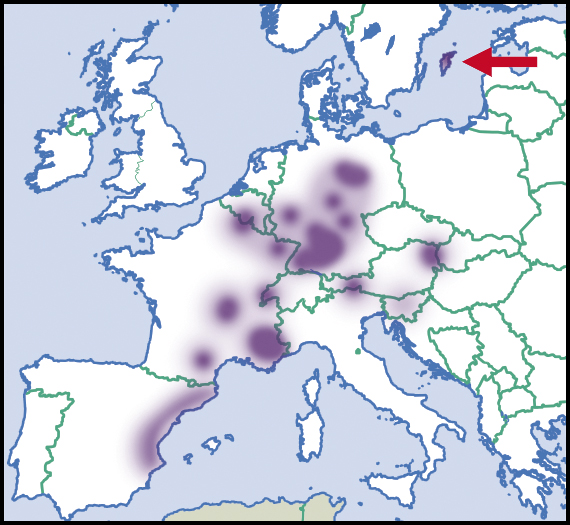
Distribution

Xerocrassa geyeri lives in Europe, showing a discontinuous, patchy distribution. Today, the species range is mainly Central Europe: parts of Germany and the south of France. Verified recent localities of Xerocrassa geyeri include:

- Gotland, Sweden
- Belgium
- Germany. It is on the Red List of Germany: critically endangered
- Switzerland: endangered
- France
- Spain

=== Fossil distribution ===
Fossil evidence suggests that current populations of Xerocrassa geyeri are relicts of a much more widespread distribution during more favourable climatic periods in the Pleistocene era. Xerocrassa geyeri fossils are relatively abundant and Xerocrassa geyeri was one of main land snails in the western and southern Europe in glacial periods. In loess deposits, the presence of Xerocrassa geyeri shells has been reported since the early Pleistocene. The subfossilised shell deposits in southern England and large parts of France are correlated with the widespread occurrence of rather arid cold steppe vegetation formations. These formations are associated with transitional phases of Pleistocene climate cycles, covering parts of Europe even during maximal glacial expansion thus providing the potential for local refugia. Both Pleistocene interstadial and pleniglacial periods resulted in altitudinal and latitudinal shiftings of these formations, as well as in reductions in their extent.

The fossil record suggests that the population history of Xerocrassa geyeri is linked to palaeoclimate changes. The latitudinal shifts of suitable habitat during Pleistocene across Europe, driven by climate change, were anticipated by Xerocrassa geyeri in the fossil record with remarkably short time lags. In other words, the species can be detected in the fossil record very soon after the onset of a suitable climate phase. Research by Pfenninger et al. (2003) suggested that the origin of the species is in the Provence from where it expanded its range first to Southwest France and subsequently from there to Germany.

Xerocrassa geyeri seems to have survived in local refugia the reduction of the favourable steppe-like habitat due to climatic extremes during the pleniglacial and interstadial periods, as it is the case today. Pfenninger & Bahl (1997) suggested that snail species with restricted dispersal might survive in habitats of a size in the magnitude of few square meters. There is increasing evidence that such small spots with a favourable microclimate existed in the periglacial area of central Europe and were presumed to have provided refuges for comparatively cold resistant snail species. Southern and eastern European refugia were also supplemented by cryptic sanctuaries in northern Europe during the late Pleistocene in shaping present day species composition.

Localities with fossil Xerocrassa geyeri are summarized in Magnin (1989) and they also include:

- United Kingdom:
  - southeastern England in interglacial periods: Bramertonian Stage and Cromerian Stage and in Late-Glacial
  - Gwithian in Cornwall, south-western England in Late Postglacial in Bronze Age about 3070 ± 103 before present (1993).
- France:
  - Côte-d'Or, France in the end of Pliocene and Burgundy, France in Early Pleistocene
  - Normandy
  - Charente

Xerocrassa geyeri can live only in open habitats so it died out in large areas (for example it became extinct in England) when the last glacial period ended and forests started to spread. It had to move to mountains where it survives today.

== Ecology ==
Xerocrassa geyeri is xerophilous species and it is found today in open calcareous or loessic grass and scrublands with a sparse vegetation cover on mountaintops, karstic highland plateaus and disturbed pastures, which are thought to constitute ecological refuges. In southeastern France it inhabits localities from 900 to 1000 m above sea level, but as anomaly it was found also in 370 m above sea level in Mont Vertoux.

Xerocrassa geyeri is hermaphroditic species and fertilisation is obligately outcrossing. The main reproduction period is from March to June and from September to October (according to the table values). It lays usually less than 10 uncalcified egss, but sometimes more (according to the table values). Juveniles are hatching from eggs in less than two weeks (according to the table values). They reach sexual maturity in one year and longevity of this species is 1–2 years.

Xerocrassa geyeri feeds on dead plants, but rarely also on living plants, epilithic lichens and on algae. Its active dispersal capacity is about 3 m during its one-year lifetime. Its competitor may be Candidula unifasciata.

== See also ==
Species with similar shell include:

- Helicopsis striata (Müller, 1774)
- Candidula unifasciata (Poiret, 1801)
