= Sardopaladilhia =

Scientific classification
- Kingdom: Animalia
- Phylum: Mollusca
- Class: Gastropoda
- Subclass: Caenogastropoda
- Order: Littorinimorpha
- Superfamily: Truncatelloidea
- Family: Moitessieriidae
- Genus: Sardopaladilhia; Manganelli, Bodon, Cianfanelli, Talenti & Giusti, 1998

Type species
- Sardopaladilhia plagigeyerica Manganelli, Bodon, Cianfanelli, Talenti & Giusti, 1998

Genus of gastropods

Sardopaladilhia is a genus of very small aquatic snails, operculate gastropod molluscs in the family Moitessieriidae.

== Species ==
Species within the genus Sardopaladilhia include:

- Sardopaladilhia buccina Rolán & Martínez-Ortí, 2003
- Sardopaladilhia distorta Rolán & Martínez-Ortí, 2003
- Sardopaladilhia marianae Rolán & Martínez-Ortí, 2003
- Sardopaladilhia plagigeyerica Manganelli, Bodon, Cianfanelli, Talenti & Giusti, 1998
- Sardopaladilhia subdistorta Rolán & Martínez-Ortí, 2003
