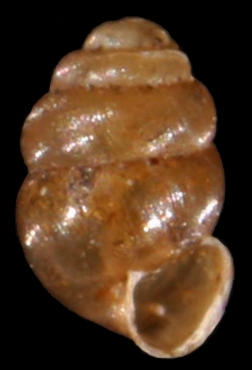
- Apertural view of a shell of Vertigo geyeri
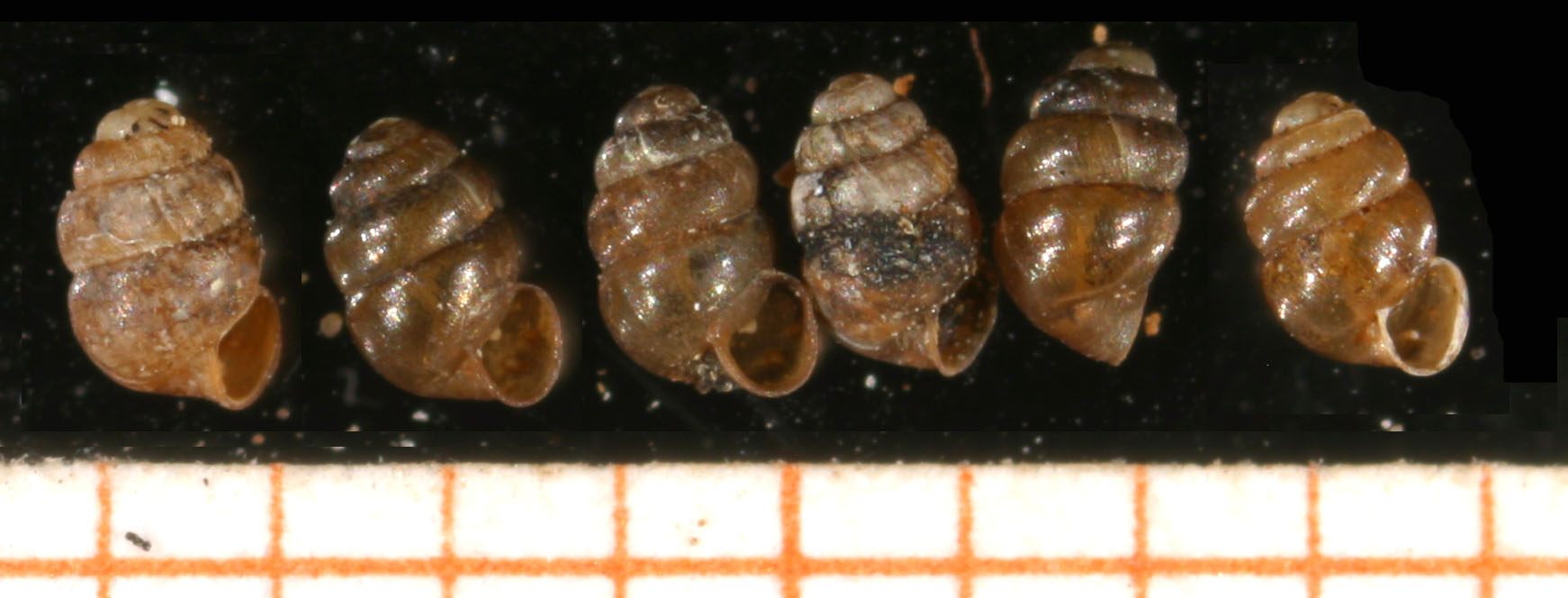
- Six shells of Vertigo geyeri, scale bar in mm

Conservation status
- Least Concern (IUCN 3.1)

Scientific classification
- Kingdom: Animalia
- Phylum: Mollusca
- Class: Gastropoda
- Order: Stylommatophora
- Family: Vertiginidae
- Subfamily: Vertigininae
- Genus: Vertigo
- Species: V. geyeri

Binomial name
- Vertigo geyeri Lindholm, 1925

Synonyms
- Vertigo geyerii Lindholm, 1925 [orth. error]; Vertigo (Glacivertigo) geyeri Lindholm, 1925 (unaccepted subgeneric classification); Vertigo (Vertigo) geyeri Lindholm, 1925 · alternate representation; Vertigo genesii var. geyeri Lindholm, 1925

= Vertigo geyeri =

Species of gastropod

Vertigo geyeri is a species of small air-breathing land snail, a terrestrial pulmonate gastropod mollusc or micromollusc in the family Vertiginidae, the whorl snails.

The specific name geyeri is in honor of German zoologist David Geyer (1855–1932).

== Description ==
The egg-shaped-oval shell measures just 1.7 to 1.9 mm (0.07 to 0.07 in). in length and 1.2 mm (0.05 in) in width. There are up to five whorls with deep seams. The aperture has four small protrusions (called "teeth") (on parietal one columellar and two palatal), it can also have fewer teeth. The colour of the shell is reddish-brown and the surface is shiny. The shell has regular growth striations and is almost smooth.

== Habitat ==
This species lives in constantly wet, calcareous flush-fens that are fed by tufa-depositing springs. In the British Isles (Ireland and United Kingdom) it often lives in association with black bog-rush Schoenus nigricans and yellow sedge Carex viridula, in dense short grasses and sedges with little Sphagnum moss.

== Distribution and conservation status ==
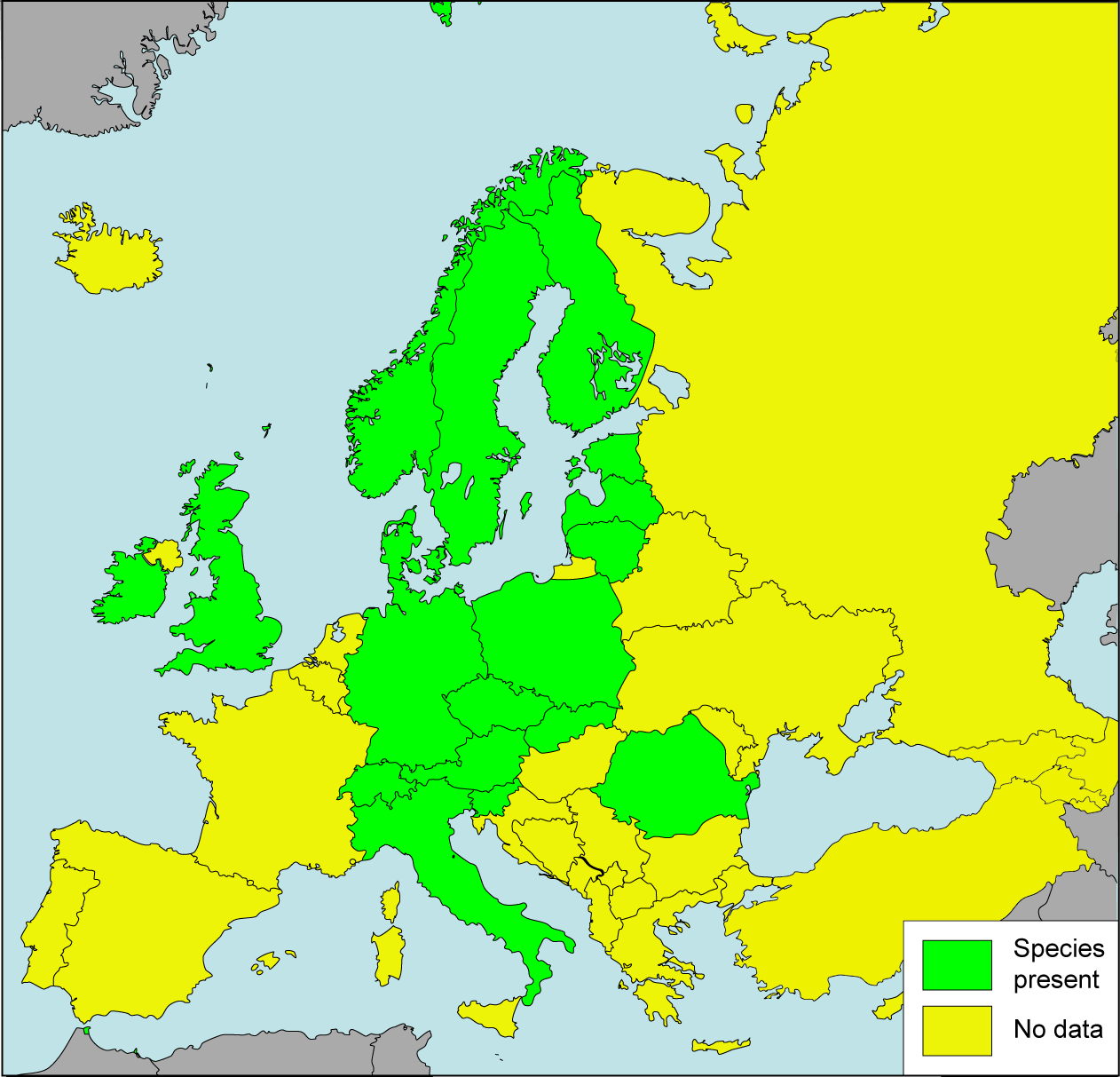
Distribution

Vertigo geyeri is a boreo-alpine species, probably endemic to Europe. It occurs in the boreal, alpine, continental and Atlantic zones with a range extending from Ireland to Russia. Its populations are scattered and local extinctions of isolated populations can occur. It is mentioned in Annex II of the European Union's Habitats Directive.

In the British Isles it is included in the List of United Kingdom Biodiversity Action Plan species, Great Britain (endangered in Great Britain). It occurs in such scattered locations as on Beinn a' Ghlò in Eastern Scotland, in North Yorkshire, in Cumbria and in Corsydd Môn in Anglesey, where there is a large, low-altitude population in a calcareous fen.

It is considered critically endangered in the Czech Republic, Its conservation status in Czech Republic in 2004-2006 is bad (U2) in report for European Commission in accordance with Habitats Directive. and it occurs in Denmark, Finland, France, Germany, Latvia, Lithuania, Norway, Poland, Slovakia, Ukraine, Sweden and Switzerland.
