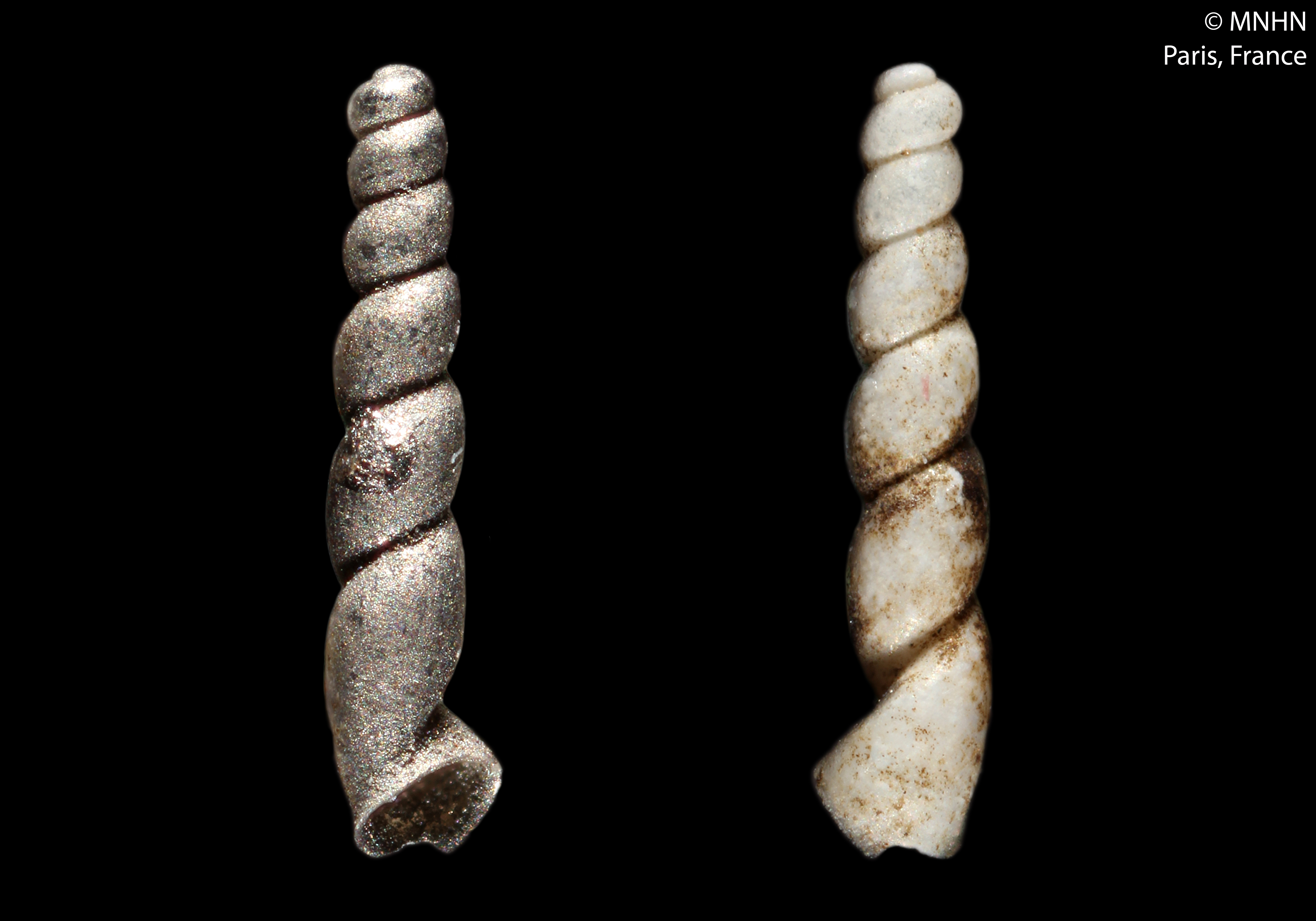
- Shell of Iglica soussensis (holotype at MNHN, Paris)

Scientific classification
- Kingdom: Animalia
- Phylum: Mollusca
- Class: Gastropoda
- Subclass: Caenogastropoda
- Order: Littorinimorpha
- Family: Moitessieriidae
- Genus: Iglica (A. J. Wagner, 1910)

Type species
- Vitrella gratulabunda A. J. Wagner, 1910

Synonyms
- Iglica (Iglica) A. J. Wagner, 1928· accepted, alternate representation; Iglica (Mervicia) Bole, 1967· accepted, alternate representation; Iglica (Rhaphica) Schütt, 1975· accepted, alternate representation

= Iglica (gastropod) =

Genus of gastropods

Iglica is a genus of very small freshwater snails with an operculum, aquatic gastropod molluscs in the family Moitessieriidae.

== Species ==
Species within the genus Iglica include:

- Iglica acicularis Angelov, 1959
- Iglica alpheus A. Reischutz & P. L. Reischutz, 2004
- Iglica bagliviaeformis Schütt, 1970
- Iglica bosnica Schütt, 1975
- Iglica calepii Niero & Pezzoli, 2016
- Iglica concii Pollonera, 1887 (uncertain)
- Iglica elongata Kuščer, 1933
- Iglica eximia Bole, 1967
- Iglica forumjuliana Pollonera, 1887
- Iglica gracilis (Clessin, 1882)
- Iglica gratulabunda (A. J. Wagner, 1910)
- Iglica hauffeni Brusina, 1886
- Iglica hellenica Falniowski & Sarbu, 2015
- Iglica illyrica Schütt, 1975
- Iglica kanalitensis A. Reischütz, N. Steiner-Reischütz & P. L. Reischütz, 2016
- Iglica karamani Kuščer, 1935
- Iglica kleinzellensis P. L. Reischütz, 1981
- Iglica langhofferi A. J. Wagner, 1928
- Iglica luxurians Kuščer, 1932
- Iglica maasseni Schütt, 1980
- Iglica seyadi Backhyus & Boeters, 1974
- Iglica sidariensis Schütt, 1980
- Iglica soussensis Ghamizi & Boulal, 2017
- Iglica tellinii Pollonera, 1887
- Iglica vobarnense Pezzoli & Toffoletto, 1968
- Iglica wolfischeri A. Reischutz & P. L. Reischutz, 2004
- Iglica xhuxhi A. Reischütz, N. Reischütz & P. L. Reischütz, 2014

Species brought into synonymy

- Iglica absoloni (A. J. Wagner, 1914): synonym of Paladilhiopsis absoloni (A. J. Wagner, 1914)
- Iglica gittenbergeri A. Reischutz & P. L. Reischutz, 2008: synonym of Paladilhiopsis gittenbergeri (A. Reischutz & P. L. Reischutz, 2008) (original combination)
- Iglica matjasici Bole, 1961: synonym of Vinodolia matjasici (Bole, 1961) (original combination)
