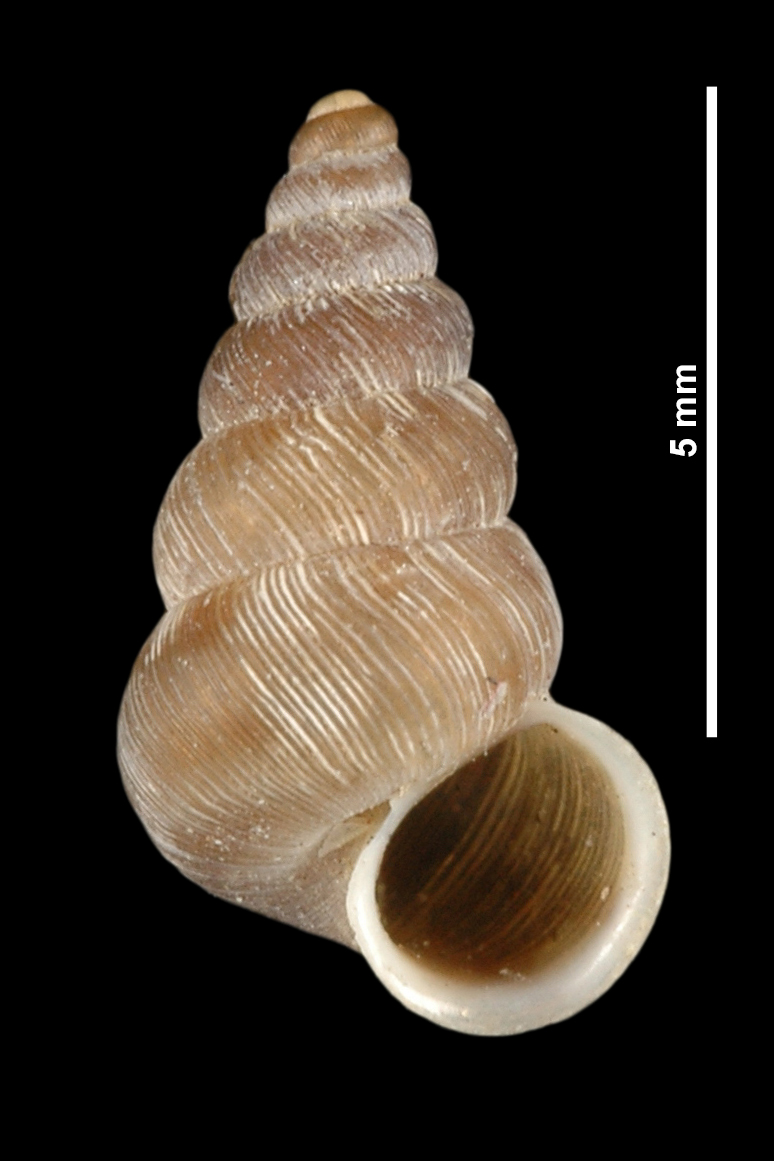
- Shell of Striolata striolata (specimen at MNHN, Paris)

Conservation status
- Least Concern (IUCN 3.1)

Scientific classification
- Kingdom: Animalia
- Phylum: Mollusca
- Class: Gastropoda
- Subclass: Caenogastropoda
- Order: Architaenioglossa
- Superfamily: Cyclophoroidea
- Family: Cochlostomatidae
- Genus: Striolata; A. J. Wagner, 1897
- Species: S. striolata

Binomial name
- Striolata striolata (Porro, 1840)

Synonyms
- Pomatias (Striolata) A. J. Wagner, 1897 (original rank); Striolatiana Caziot, 1908; Toffolettia Giusti, 1971 (junior synonym)

= Striolata =

Genus of land snails

Striolata is a monotypic genus of gastropods belonging to the family Cochlostomatidae. The only species is Striolata striolata.

The species is found in Mediterranean, Pacific Ocean.
