= Palacanthilhiopsis =

Scientific classification
- Kingdom: Animalia
- Phylum: Mollusca
- Class: Gastropoda
- Subclass: Caenogastropoda
- Order: Littorinimorpha
- Family: Hydrobiidae
- Genus: Palacanthilhiopsis; Bernasconi. 1988

Type species
- Palacanthilhiopsis vervierii Bernasconi, 1988

Genus of gastropods

Palacanthilhiopsis is a genus of very small or minute freshwater snails with an operculum, aquatic gastropod mollusks in the family Moitessieriidae.

== Species ==
Species within the genus Palacanthilhiopsis include:

- Palacanthilhiopsis carolinae Girardi, 2009
- Palacanthilhiopsis kuiperi Girardi, 2009
- Palacanthilhiopsis margritae Boeters & Falkner, 2003
- Palacanthilhiopsis vervierii Bernasconi, 1988
