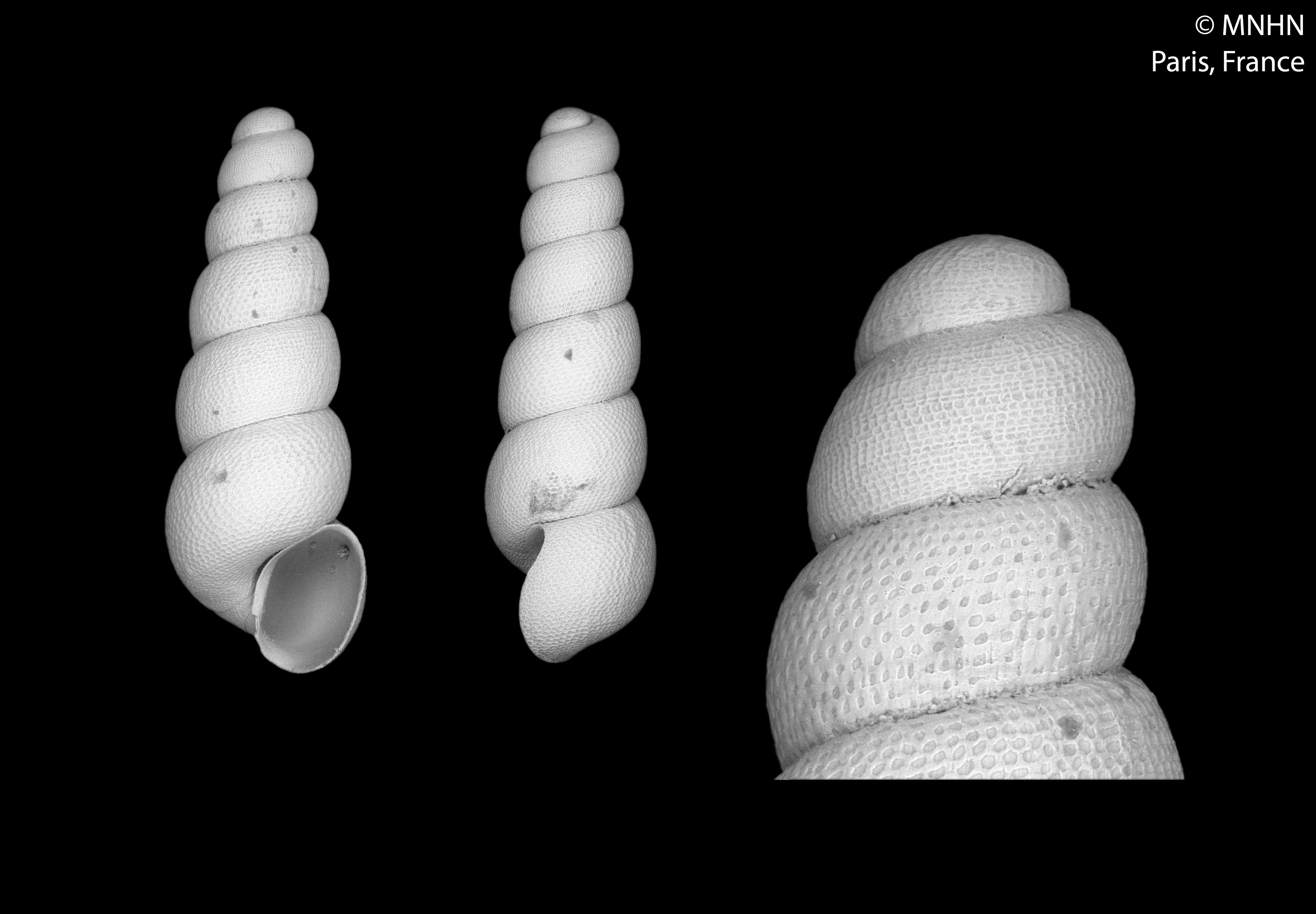
- Shell of Moitessieria boetersi (holotype at MNHN, Paris)

Scientific classification
- Kingdom: Animalia
- Phylum: Mollusca
- Class: Gastropoda
- Subclass: Caenogastropoda
- Order: Littorinimorpha
- Superfamily: Truncatelloidea
- Family: Moitessieriidae
- Genus: Moitessieria; Bourguignat, 1863

Type species
- Paludina simoniana Saint-Simon, 1848

= Moitessieria =

Genus of gastropods

Moitessieria is a genus of minute freshwater snails with an operculum, aquatic gastropod molluscs or micromolluscs in the family Moitessieriidae.

Moitessieria is the type genus of the family Moitessieriidae.

== Species ==
Species within the genus Moitessieria include:

- Moitessieria audiberti Girardi, 2015
- Moitessieria aurea Tarruella, Corbella, Prats, Guillén & Alba, 2012
- Moitessieria barrinae Alba, Corbella, Prats, Tarruella & Guillén, 2007
- Moitessieria bodoni Girardi, 2009
- Moitessieria boetersi Girardi, 2015
- Moitessieria bourguignati Coutagne, 1883
- Moitessieria calloti Girardi, 2004
- Moitessieria canfalonensis Corbella, Bros, Guillen, Prats & Cadevall, 2020
- Moitessieria collellensis Corbella, Alba, Tarruella, Prats & Guillén, 2006
- Moitessieria dexteri Corbella, Guillén, Prats, Tarruella & Alba, 2012
- Moitessieria fontsaintei Bertrand, 2001
- Moitessieria foui Boeters, 2003
- Moitessieria garrotxaensis Quiñonero-Salgado & Rolán, 2017
- Moitessieria guadelopensis Boeters, 2003
- Moitessieria guilhemensis Callot-Girardi & Boeters, 2017
- Moitessieria hedraensis Quiñonero-Salgado & Rolán, 2017
- Moitessieria heideae Boeters & Falkner, 2003
- Moitessieria juvenisanguis Boeters & E. Gittenberger, 1980
- Moitessieria lineolata (Coutagne, 1882)
- Moitessieria lludrigaensis Boeters, 2003
- Moitessieria locardi Coutagne, 1883
- Moitessieria magnanae Girardi, 2009
- Moitessieria massoti Bourguignat, 1863
- Moitessieria meijersae Boeters, 2003
- Moitessieria mugae Corbella, Alba, Tarruella, Prats & Guillén, 2006
- Moitessieria nezi Boeters & Bertrand, 2001
- Moitessieria notenboomi Boeters, 2003
- Moitessieria olleri Altimira, 1960
- Moitessieria ouvezensis Boeters & Falkner, 2009
- Moitessieria pasterae Corbella, Alba, Tarruella, Guillén & Prats, 2009
- Moitessieria pesanta Quiñonero-Salgado & Rolán, 2019
- Moitessieria prioratensis Corbella, Alba, Tarruella, Guillén & Prats, 2009
- Moitessieria punctata Alba, Tarruella, Prats, Guillén & Corbella, 2010
- Moitessieria racamondi Callot-Girardi, 2013
- Moitessieria rhodani Coutagne, 1883
- Moitessieria ripacurtiae Tarruella, Corbella, Guillén, Prats & Alba, 2013
- Moitessieria robresia Boeters, 2003
- Moitessieria rolandiana Bourguignat, 1863
- Moitessieria sanctichristophori Corbella, Guillén, Prats, Tarruella & Alba, 2011
- Moitessieria seminiana Boeters, 2003
- Moitessieria servaini (Bourguignat, 1880)
- Moitessieria simoniana (Saint-Simon, 1848)
- Moitessieria tatirocae Tarruella, Corbella, Prats, Guillén & Alba, 2015

Species brought into synonymy

- Moitessieria corsica'Bernasconi, 1994: synonym of Corseria corsica (Bernasconi, 1994)
- Moitessieria lescherae Boeters, 1981: synonym of Sorholia lescherae (Boeters, 1981)
- Moitessieria rayi (Locard, 1882): synonym of Spiralix rayi (Locard, 1882)
- Moitessieria wienini Girardi, 2001: synonym of Henrigirardia wienini (Girardi, 2001)
