= David Geyer =

German zoologist, malacologist and paleontologist

David Geyer (6 November 1855 – 6 November 1932) was a German zoologist, malacologist and paleontologist.

== Bibliography ==
Works by David Geyer were published in German language:

- (1896). Unsere Land- und Süsswasser-Mollusken. Einführung in die Molluskenfauna Deutschlands. Nebst einem Anhang über das Sammeln der Mollusken: i-vi, 1-85, i-xii. Stuttgart.
- (1908). "Beiträge zur Molluskenfauna Schwabens II. Vallonien". Jahreshefte des Vereins fuer vaterländische Naturkunde in Württemberg 64: 305-330, Taf. 3-4. Stuttgart.
- (1909). Unsere Land- und Süsswasser-Mollusken. Einführung in die Molluskenfauna Deutschlands. Nebst einem Anhang über das Sammeln der Mollusken (2nd ed.): i-viii, 1-155. Stuttgart.
- (1909). Die Weichtiere Deutschlands: eine biologische Darstellung der einheimischen Schnecken und Muscheln.
- (1917). "Die Mollusken des schwäbischen Lösses in Vergangenheit und Gegenwart". Jahresber. Ver. vaterl. Naturk. Württemberg 73: 23-92, pi. 2.
- (1925). "David Geyer geboren am 6. November 1855 zu Köngen am Neckar". Archiv für Molluskenkunde, 57: 162-170. (autobiography)
- (1927). Unsere Land- und Süsswasser-Mollusken. Einführung in die Molluskenfauna Deutschlands (3rd ed.): i-xi, 1-224. Stuttgart.

Species described by David Geyer include:

- Vallonia suevica Geyer, 1908

Species and subspecies named in honor of David Geyer include:

- Vertigo geyeri Lindholm, 1925
- Bythiospeum geyeri (Fuchs, 1925)
- Valvata piscinalis geyeri (Menzel, 1904)
- Xerocrassa geyeri (Soós, 1926)
