= Micridyla =

Scientific classification
- Kingdom: Animalia
- Phylum: Mollusca
- Class: Gastropoda
- Order: Stylommatophora
- Family: Clausiliidae
- Genus: Micridyla; Nordsieck, 1973
- Species: M. pinteri

Binomial name
- Micridyla pinteri (Nordsieck, 1973)

Genus of land snails

Micridyla is a monotypic genus of gastropods belonging to the family Clausiliidae. The only species is Micridyla pinteri.

The species is found in Europe.
