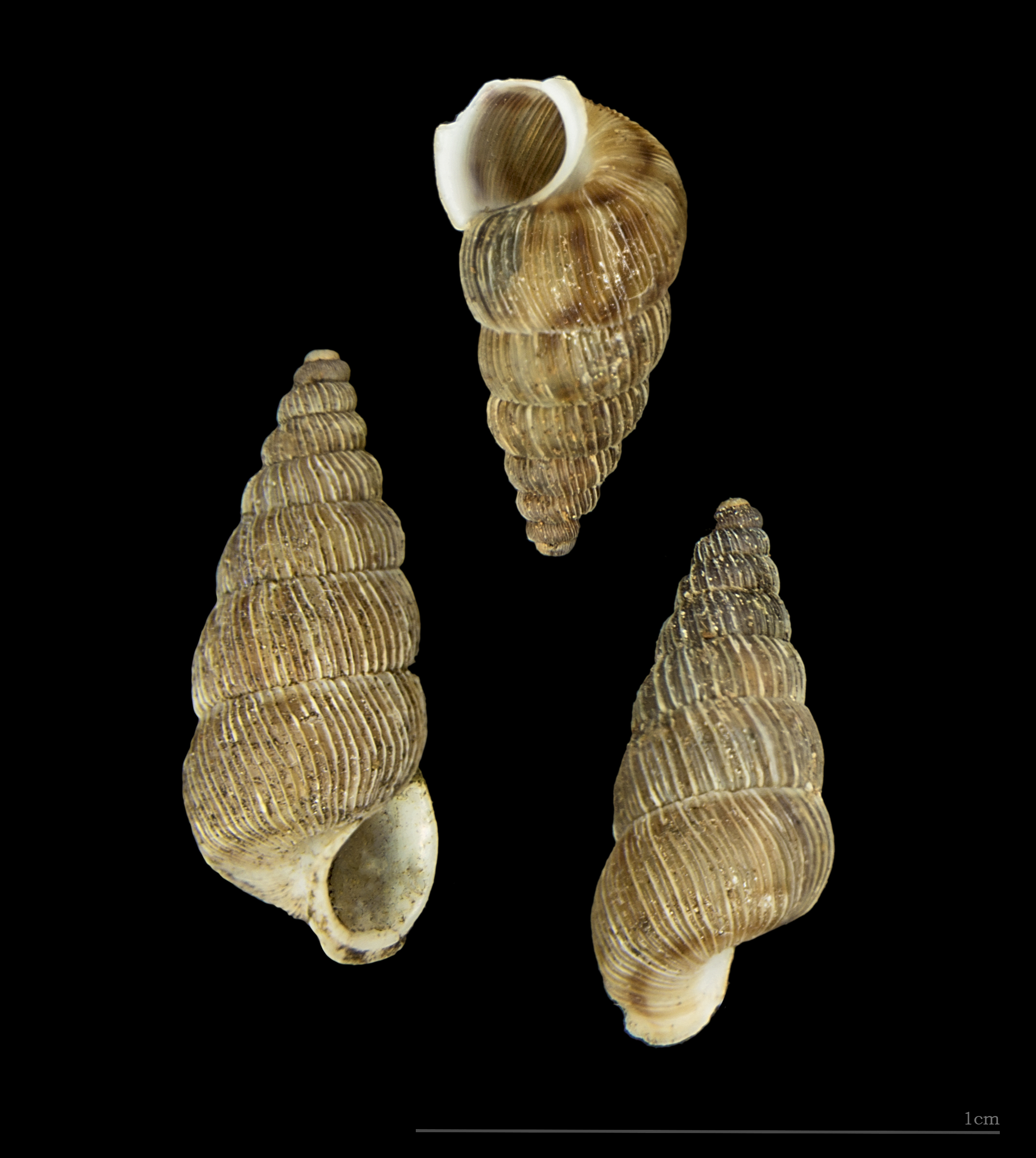
- Cochlostoma nouleti

Scientific classification
- Kingdom: Animalia
- Phylum: Mollusca
- Class: Gastropoda
- Subclass: Caenogastropoda
- Order: Architaenioglossa
- Family: Cochlostomatidae
- Genus: Cochlostoma; Jan, 1830

Type species
- Cyclostoma maculatum Draparnaud, 1805

= Cochlostoma =

Genus of gastropods

Cochlostoma is a genus of land snails with an operculum, terrestrial gastropod mollusks in the family Cochlostomatidae.

== Distribution ==
Calcareous terrains of South Europe and North Africa.

== Description and Anatomy ==
Mantle caves serve as pulmones. Operculum corneous and multispiral. Penis is oriented above the right tentacle. Sexual dimorphism is often recognisable in external morphology.

== Ecology ==
All species are confined to limestone habitats, feeding on dead plants and microflora. Females lays large eggs, hatching after three to six weeks.

== Species ==
The genus Cochlostoma contains at least 140 species and subspecies, including:

subgenus Auritus

- Cochlostoma achaicum (O. Boettger, 1885)
- Cochlostoma alleryanum (Paulucci, 1879)
- Cochlostoma auritum (Rossmässler, 1837)
- Cochlostoma fuchsi Feher, 2004
- Cochlostoma georgi (A.J. Wagner, 1906)
- Cochlostoma hellenicum (Saint-Simon, 1869)
- Cochlostoma hoyeri (Polinski, 1922)
- Cochlostoma paladilhianum (Saint-Simon, 1869)
- Cochlostoma parnonis Schütt, 1981
- Cochlostoma pinteri Feher, 2004
- Cochlostoma roseoli (A.J. Wagner, 1901)
- Cochlostoma tessellatum (Rossmässler, 1837)
- Cochlostoma westerlundi (Paulucci, 1879)

subgenus Cochlostoma

- Cochlostoma septemspirale (Razoumowsky, 1789)

subgenus Turritus

- Cochlostoma acutum (Caziot, 1908)
- Cochlostoma adamii (Paulucci, 1879)
- Cochlostoma affine (Benoit, 1882)
- Cochlostoma braueri (A.J. Wagner, 1897)
- Cochlostoma crosseanum (Paulucci, 1879)
- Cochlostoma elegans (Clessin, 1879)
- Cochlostoma euboicum (Westerlund, 1885)
- Cochlostoma gracile (L. Pfeiffer, 1849)
- Cochlostoma kleciaki (Braun, 1887)
- Cochlostoma macei (Bourguignat, 1869)
- Cochlostoma montanum (Issel, 1866)
- Cochlostoma mostarensis (A.J. Wagner, 1906)
- Cochlostoma nanum (Westerlund, 1879)
- Cochlostoma pageti Klemm, 1962
- Cochlostoma patulum (Draparnaud, 1801)
- Cochlostoma sardoum (Westerlund, 1890)
- Cochlostoma simrothi (Caziot, 1908)
- Cochlostoma stossichi (Hirc, 1881)
- Cochlostoma sturanii (A.J. Wagner, 1897)

subgenus Dalfreddia

- Cochlostoma porroi (Strobel, 1850)
- Cochlostoma subalpinum (Pini, 1884)

subgenus Clessiniella

- Cochlostoma anomphale Boeckel, 1939
- Cochlostoma stelucarum Zallot et al., 2021
- Cochlostoma tergestinum (Westerlund, 1878)
- Cochlostoma villae (Strobel, 1851)
- Cochlostoma waldemari (A.J. Wagner, 1897)

subgenus Eupomatias

- Cochlostoma henricae (Strobel, 1851)
- Cochlostoma philippianum (Gredler, 1853)

subgenus Wagneriola

- Cochlostoma scalarinum (A. & J.B. Villa, 1841)

subgenus Lovcenia

- Cochlostoma dalmatinum (L. Pfeiffer, 1863)
- Cochlostoma erika (A.J. Wagner, 1906)
- Cochlostoma jakschae Zallot, Fehér, Bamberger, Gittenberger, 2015
- Cochlostoma lanatum Zallot, Fehér, Bamberger, Gittenberger, 2015
- Cochlostoma tropojanum Zallot, Fehér, Bamberger, Gittenberger, 2015

unknown subgenus

- Cochlostoma cinerascens (Rossmässler, 1837)
- Cochlostoma cretense (Maltzan, 1887)

== Synonyms of Cochlostoma ==
- Auritus Westerlund, 1883
- Auritus (Auritus) Westerlund, 1883
- Auritus (Holcopoma) Kobelt & Möllendorff, 1899
- Auritus (Pleuropoma) A. J. Wagner, 1897
- Auritus (Titanopoma) A. J. Wagner, 1897
- Cochlostoma (Auritus) Westerlund, 1883· accepted, alternate representation
- Cochlostoma (Cinerascens) A. J. Wagner, 1897· accepted, alternate representation
- Cochlostoma (Clessiniella) Zallot, Groenenberg, De Mattia, Fehér & E. Gittenberger, 2015 (junior objective synonym)
- Cochlostoma (Cochlostoma) Jan, 1830· accepted, alternate representation
- Cochlostoma (Dalfreddia) Zallot, Groenenberg, De Mattia, Fehér & E. Gittenberger, 2015· accepted, alternate representation
- Cochlostoma (Eupomatias) A. J. Wagner, 1897· accepted, alternate representation
- Cochlostoma (Holcopoma) Kobelt & Möllendorff, 1899
- Cochlostoma (Lovcenia) Zallot, Groenenberg, De Mattia, Fehér & E. Gittenberger, 2015· accepted, alternate representation
- Cochlostoma (Neglecta) A. J. Wagner, 1897· accepted, alternate representation
- Cochlostoma (Scalarina) A. J. Wagner, 1897· accepted, alternate representation
- Cochlostoma (Titanopoma) A. J. Wagner, 1897 (junior synonym)
- Cochlostoma (Turritus) Westerlund, 1883· accepted, alternate representation
- Cyclostoma (Cochlostoma) Jan, 1830 (original rank)
- Diversicolor A. J. Wagner, 1905 (a junior synonym)
- Hartmannia Newton, 1891
- Holcopoma Kobelt & Möllendorff, 1899
- Patuliana Caziot, 1908
- Personatus Westerlund, 1883
- Pleuropoma A. J. Wagner, 1897
- Pleuropomatia Tomlin, 1929
- Pomatias (Atlantica) A. J. Wagner, 1897 (invalid: junior homonym of Atlantica Ancey, 1887)
- Pomatias (Auritus) Westerlund, 1883
- Pomatias (Cinerascens) A. J. Wagner, 1897
- Pomatias (Cisalpina) A. J. Wagner, 1897
- Pomatias (Difficilis) A. J. Wagner, 1897 (invalid:junior objective synonym of Hartmannia)
- Pomatias (Eupomatias) A. J. Wagner, 1897
- Pomatias (Maculatus) Westerlund, 1883
- Pomatias (Nana) A. J. Wagner, 1897 (invalid: junior homonym of Nana Schumacher, 1817)
- Pomatias (Neglecta) A. J. Wagner, 1897
- Pomatias (Personatus) Westerlund, 1883
- Pomatias (Philippiana) A. J. Wagner, 1897
- Pomatias (Pleuropoma) A. J. Wagner, 1897 (invalid: junior homonym of Pleuropoma Möllendorff, 1893; * * Holcopoma and Pleuropomatia are replacement names)
- Pomatias (Pomatiella) Clessin, 1889
- Pomatias (Sardoa) A. J. Wagner, 1897
- Pomatias (Scalarina) A. J. Wagner, 1897
- Pomatias (Septemspiraliana) Caziot, 1910
- Pomatias (Septemspiralis) A. J. Wagner, 1897
- Pomatias (Strobelia) Clessin, 1889 (invalid: junior homonym of Strobelia Rondani, 1868 [Diptera])
- Pomatias (Tesselata) A. J. Wagner, 1897
- Pomatias (Titanopoma) A. J. Wagner, 1897 (junior objective synonym of Auritus)
- Pomatias (Turritus) Westerlund, 1883
- Stereopoma A. J. Wagner, 1897 (junior synonym)
