= J.J.I. Alcide de Paladilhe =

J.J.I. Alcide de Paladilhe (1814–1876) was a French malacologist.

He wrote (1866-1869) Nouvelles miscellanées malacologiques par M. le Docteur Paladilhe Paris :Chez Savy,(1866-1869) online here at Biodiversity Heritage Library

Paladilhe's collection is in the Natural History Museum of Geneva.
