= Stefan Clessin =

German malacologist (1833-1911)

Stefan Clessin (13 November 1833, in Würzburg – 21 December 1911, in Regensburg) was a German malacologist.

He served as a military officer, and from 1862 worked for the Bavarian railways. He was an editor of the Malakozoologische Blätter and made major contributions to Martini and Chemitz' Systematisches Conchylien-Cabinet. He conducted research of fossil mollusks as well as living species.

== Bibliography ==
- Die mollusken-fauna der umgegend von Augsburg (1871); Bericht des Naturhistorischen vereins in Augsburg, bd. XXI.
- Ueber Missbildungen der Mollusken und ihrer Gehäuse, (1873); Bericht of the Naturhistorischer Verein in Augsburg, 22.
- Deutsche excursions-mollusken-fauna, (1876), Nurnberg : Bauer & Raspe.
- Clessin S. (1880). "Studien über die Familie der Paludinen". Malakozoologische Blätter (ser. 2)2: 161-196.
- Die Molluskenfauna Oesterreich-Ungarns und der Schweiz, (5 parts, 1887–90), Nürnberg : Bauer & Raspe.

== Taxa described ==
Clessin named more than 90 species of non-marine gastropod mollusks, including:

- Bythiospeum pfeifferi (Clessin, 1890)
- Bythiospeum tschapecki (Clessin, 1882)
