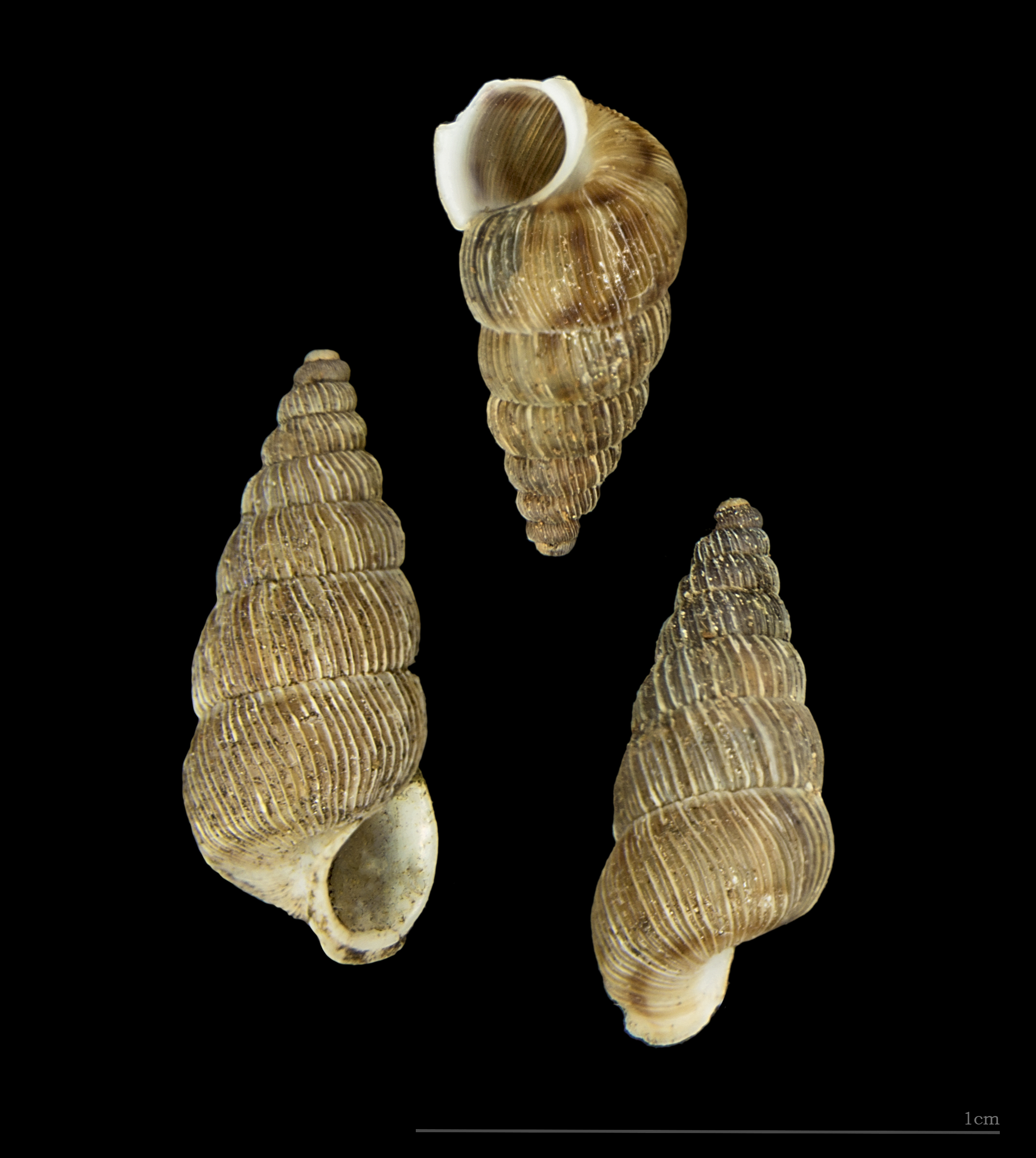
- Cochlostoma nouleti

Scientific classification
- Kingdom: Animalia
- Phylum: Mollusca
- Class: Gastropoda
- Subclass: Caenogastropoda
- Order: Architaenioglossa
- Superfamily: Cyclophoroidea
- Family: Cochlostomatidae; Kobelt, 1902

Synonyms
- Cochlostomatinae Kobelt, 1902

= Cochlostomatidae =

Family of gastropods

Cochlostomatinae are a family of small land snails which have opercula and gills. These are terrestrial gastropod mollusks in the superfamily Cyclophoroidea.

== Distribution ==
These snails live in the limestone mountains of southern Europe and North Africa.

== Genera ==
Genera in the family Cochlostomatidae include:

- Apolloniana Brandt, 1958
- Cochlostoma Jan 1830
- † Electrea Klebs, 1886
- Obscurella Clessin, 1889
- † Proelektrea Hrubesch, 1965
- Rara A. J. Wagner, 1897
- Rhabdotakra A. J. Wagner, 1897
- Striolata A. J. Wagner, 1897

Genera brought into synonymy

- Apricana Caziot, 1908: synonym of Obscurella Clessin, 1889
- Auritus Westerlund, 1883: synonym of Cochlostoma (Auritus) Westerlund, 1883 represented as Cochlostoma Jan, 1830
- Crassilabriana Fagot, 1891: synonym of Obscurella Clessin, 1889
- Elektrea [sic] †: synonym of Electrea Klebs, 1886 † (incorrect subsequent spelling)
- Hartmannia Newton, 1891: synonym of Cochlostoma (Turritus) Westerlund, 1883 represented as Cochlostoma Jan, 1830
- Hidalgoiana Fagot, 1891: synonym of Obscurella Clessin, 1889
- Holcopoma Kobelt & Möllendorff, 1899: synonym of Cochlostoma (Auritus) Westerlund, 1883 represented as Cochlostoma Jan, 1830
- Imerezia Zallot, Groenenberg, De Mattia, Fehér & E. Gittenberger, 2015: synonym of Rara A. J. Wagner, 1897
- Neglectiana Fagot, 1891: synonym of Obscurella Clessin, 1889
- Nouletiana Fagot, 1891: synonym of Obscurella Clessin, 1889
- Obscuriana Fagot, 1891: synonym of Obscurella Clessin, 1889
- Partiotiana Fagot, 1891: synonym of Obscurella Clessin, 1889
- Patuliana Caziot, 1908: synonym of Cochlostoma (Turritus) Westerlund, 1883 represented as Cochlostoma Jan, 1830
- Personatus Westerlund, 1883: synonym of Cochlostoma (Auritus) Westerlund, 1883 represented as Cochlostoma Jan, 1830
- Pleuropoma A. J. Wagner, 1897: synonym of Cochlostoma (Auritus) Westerlund, 1883 represented as Cochlostoma Jan, 1830
- Pleuropomatia Tomlin, 1929: synonym of Cochlostoma (Auritus) Westerlund, 1883 represented as Cochlostoma Jan, 1830
- Stereopoma A. J. Wagner, 1897: synonym of Cochlostoma (Turritus) Westerlund, 1883 represented as Cochlostoma Jan, 1830 (junior synonym)
- Striolatiana Caziot, 1908: synonym of Striolata A. J. Wagner, 1897
- Strobelia Clessin, 1889: synonym of Cochlostoma (Eupomatias) A. J. Wagner, 1897 represented as Cochlostoma Jan, 1830 (Invalid: junior homonym of Strobelia Rondani, 1868 [Diptera], Eupomatias has the same type species)
- Toffolettia Giusti, 1971: synonym of Striolata A. J. Wagner, 1897 (junior synonym)
- Wagneriola Zallot, Groenenberg, De Mattia, Fehér & E. Gittenberger, 2015: synonym of Cochlostoma (Scalarina) A. J. Wagner, 1897 represented as Cochlostoma Jan, 1830 (objective junior homonym)
