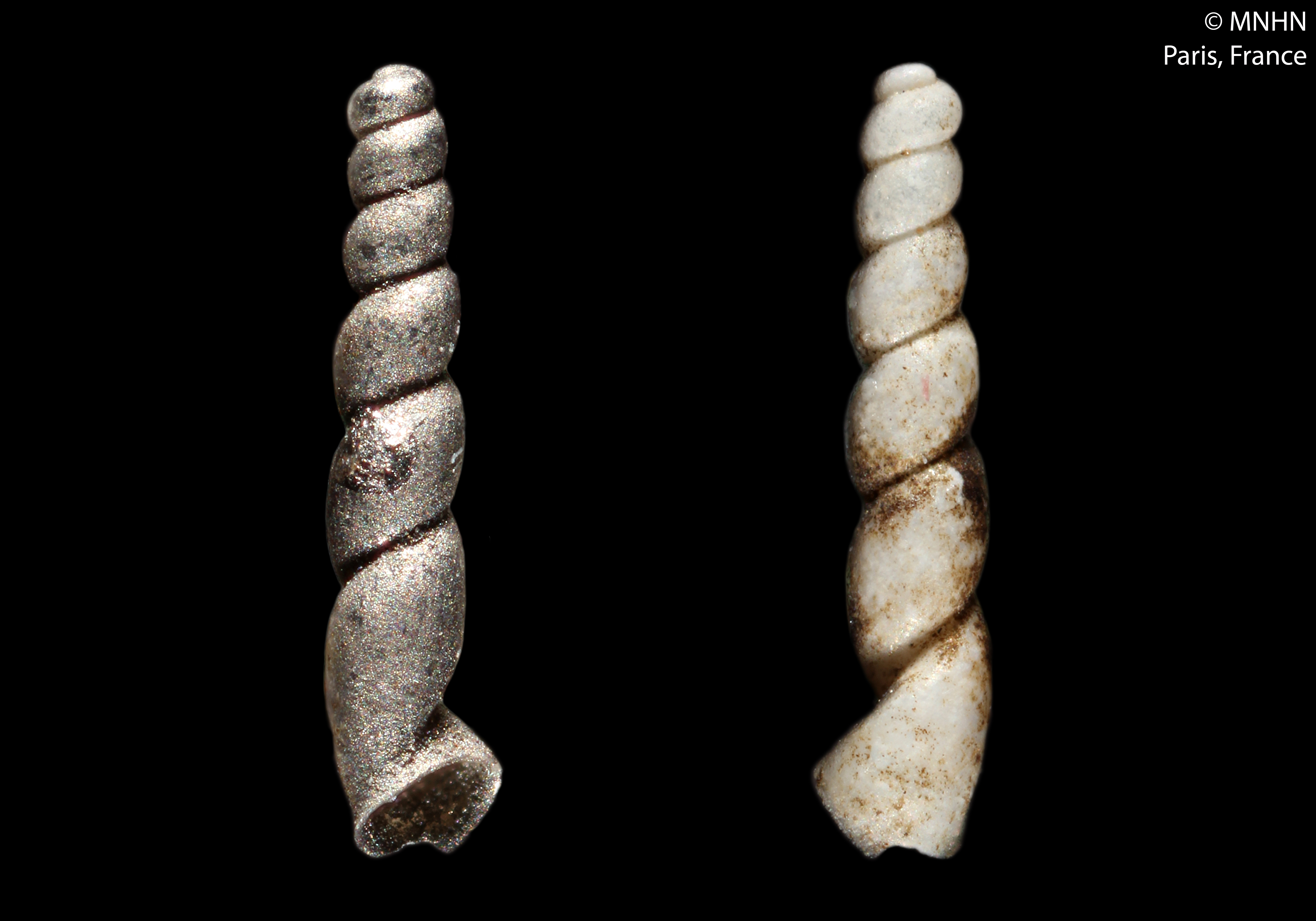
- Shell of Iglica soussensis (holotype at MNHN, Paris)

Scientific classification
- Kingdom: Animalia
- Phylum: Mollusca
- Class: Gastropoda
- Subclass: Caenogastropoda
- Order: Littorinimorpha
- Superfamily: Truncatelloidea
- Family: Moitessieriidae; Bourguignat, 1863

Type genus
- Moitessieria Bourguignat, 1863

= Moitessieriidae =

Family of gastropods

Moitessieriidae is a family of small freshwater snails, aquatic gastropod molluscs in the superfamily Truncatelloidea.

According to the taxonomy of the Gastropoda by Bouchet & Rocroi (2005) the family Moitessieriidae has no subfamilies.

There are known 55 freshwater species of Moitessieriidae in the Palearctic region.

== Genera ==
Genera within the family Moitessieriidae include:

- Atebbania Ghamizi, Bodon, Boulal & Giusti, 1999
- Baldufa Alba, Tarruella, Prats, Guillen & Corbella, 2010
- Bosnidilhia Boeters, Glöer & Pešić, 2013
- Bythiospeum Bourguignat, 1882
- Clameia Boeters & E. Gittenberger, 1990
- Corseria Boeters & Falkner, 2009
- Henrigirardia Boeters & Falkner, 2003
- Iglica A. J. Wagner, 1928
- Lanzaia Brusina, 1906
- Lanzaiopsis Bole, 1989
- Moitessieria Bourguignat, 1863 – type genus
- Palacanthilhiopsis Bernasconi, 1988
- Paladilhia Bourguignat, 1865
- Paladilhiopsis Pavlovic, 1913
- Palaospeum Boeters, 1999
- Plagigeyeria Tomlin, 1930
- Sardopaladilhia Manganelli, Bodon, Cianfanelli, Talenti & Giusti, 1998
- Sorholia Boeters & Falkner, 2009
- Spiralix Boeters, 1972
- Saxurinator Schütt, 1960
- Trogloiranica Fatemi, Malek-Hosseini, Falniowski, Hofman, Kuntner & Grego, 2019

Synonyms

- Costellina Kuščer, 1933: synonym of Paladilhiopsis (Costellina) Kuščer, 1933 represented as Paladilhiopsis Pavlović, 1913 (original rank)
- Vitrella Clessin, 1877: synonym of Bythiospeum Bourguignat, 1882 (invalid: junior homonym of Vitrella Swainson, 1840; Bythiospeum is a replacement name)
