= List of non-marine molluscs of Turkey =

Location of Turkey

The non-marine molluscs of the country of Turkey are a part of the molluscan fauna of Turkey. The biodiversity of non-marine molluscs of Turkey is richer than in surrounding European states.

There are at least 825 species of non-marine molluscs living in the wild in Turkey. An approximate guess to the total number, however, is of about 1030 non-marine molluscs in Turkey (see the table below). There are a total of 825 species of gastropods, which breaks down to 95 (counted 80 "Prosobranchia" only and at least 15 other freshwater snails from this list) taxa of freshwater gastropods (including brackish water species), and 730 species (and subspecies) of land gastropods. There is also relevant number of freshwater bivalves living in the wild in Turkey.

According to Gümüş et al. (2009), the Turkish malacofauna of land gastropods currently comprises 730 valid species and subspecies of terrestrial snails, belonging to 36 families.

Gümüş et al. (2009) stated that Turkey has a very rich freshwater malacofauna with a very large proportion of endemic species. Those authors estimated that Turkey is inhabited by at least 300 species of freshwater molluscs.

Summary table of species in the wild of Turkey
Mollusc	Number
Freshwater gastropods	at least 95 taxa (80 species and subspecies of "Prosobranchia" include brackish waters + 15 other freshwater snails from this list)
Land gastropods	730 valid species and subspecies and estimation is over 1.000 including species and subspecies waiting to be recovered
Total gastropods	825
Bivalves	??
non-marine molluscs	at least 825 gastropods plus unknown number of freshwater bivalves. (730 taxa of land gastropods + approximate guess 300 freshwater molluscs = gives approximate guess of about 1030 taxa of non-marine molluscs.)

There are also significant numbers of non-indigenous species, including bivalves and various synanthropic gastropods and bivalves.

== Land gastropods overview ==
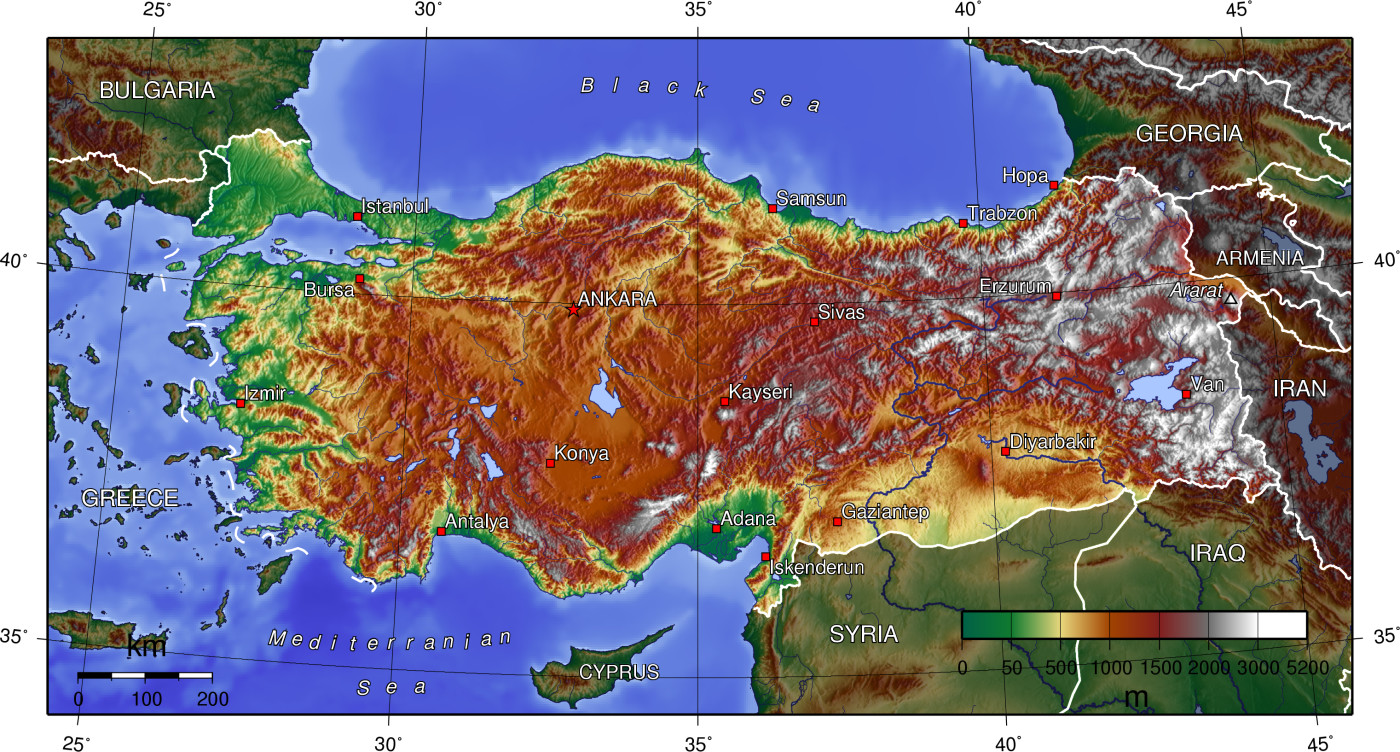
The highly diversified geographical relief of Turkey supports a very rich malacofauna.

A country such as Turkey, with a highly variable relief and a diversified climate and vegetation, can support a similarly rich and diversified malacofauna of terrestrial gastropods. Consequently, the recent changes in both land use and climate (which is gradually shifting from semi-arid and winter-cold Central Turkey to a subtropical periphery with high humidity during winter) have immediately affected the malacofauna, causing area shifts following the unstable environmental conditions, including depletion or even complete loss of some populations. Increasing pasture farming leads to a loss of forest vegetation, and thus to a loss of those molluscan species which are adapted to such conditions.

The recent rise of average summer temperature resulting from global warming may particularly affect the Mediterranean species. Gümüş et al. (2009) speculated that both the average length of the dry summer period and the absolute temperature are rising, and that the aestivation period of species adapted to the Mediterranean drought is now too long. The animals die from starvation or desiccation, and several species or subspecies may already be approaching the verge of extinction.

As far as nomenclature, an average of two to three additional synonym names for each taxon are available to land gastropods in Turkey.

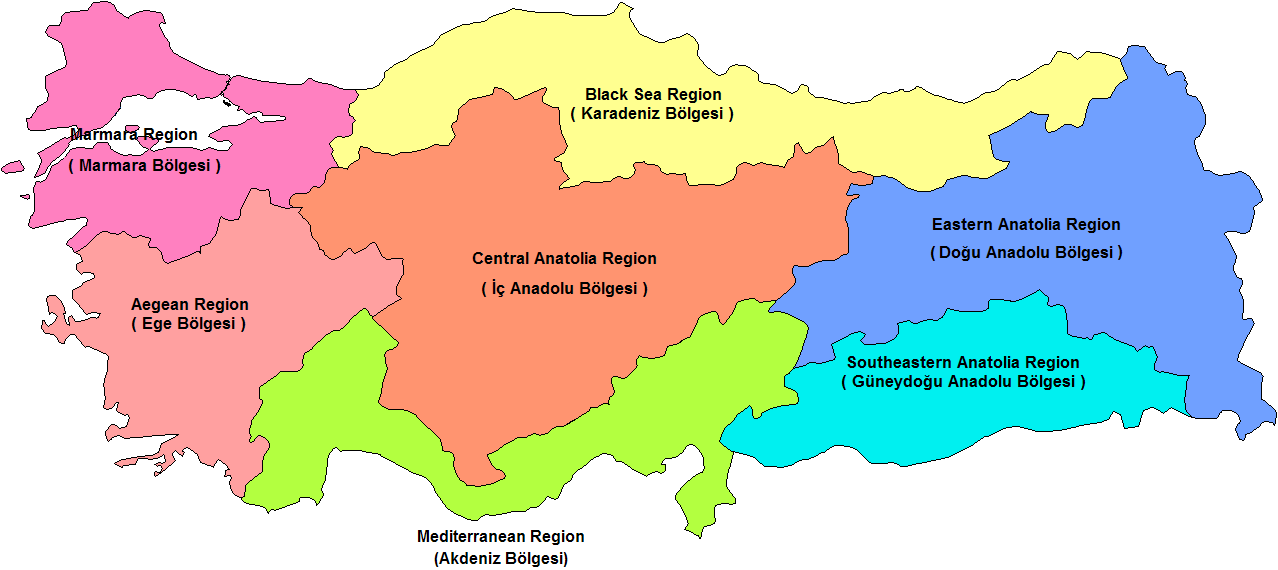
Administrative regions of Turkey differ climatologically and geographically. Land snails of those regions (with Black Sea Region divided into two: West and Central Black Sea and Eastern Black Sea) were examined biogeographically by Cook (1997).

The degree of endemism for the area of Turkey is about 65%. The degree of endemism on the species level is relatively high and is comparable to that of Greece, which houses the highest number of terrestrial snail taxa in Europe, with a similarly high value of endemism. In Turkey, several pulmonate families reach a maximum of biodiversity. The biodiversity has been able to develop there without any major interruptions since the Pliocene.

The malacofauna of some areas, such as the inner Anatolian steppe areas, and many of the densely forested mountain ranges, is incompletely ascertained or almost completely unknown. As research progresses, records of species new to science can be expected, and the knowledge of the ranges of already-known taxa will increase. Another accretion in taxa numbers may be caused by the resolution of cryptic species clusters with the help of DNA sequencing methods, the Barcoding Project, and other related activities.

== History of malacozoology of terrestrial gastropods ==
The first species from the Turkish terrestrial malacofauna were described by Guillaume-Antoine Olivier (1756–1814), who, amongst others, collected natural history objects in the Middle East. For example he named the following species: Multidentula ovularis (Olivier, 1801) and Bulgarica denticulata (Olivier, 1801) from "Ghemlek" (= Gemlik in the Bay of Mudanya) or Assyriella guttata (Olivier, 1804) from Urfa. After Olivier, the area was visited by the German Johannes Rudolf Roth and his party, and then was target of other scientists, naturalists and collectors like Bellardi, Boissier, Dubois de Montpereux, Frivaldsky, Huet de Pavillon, Parreyss, Schläfli, Sievers and others. Their collections went to the most prolific malacologists interested in the area like Jules René Bourguignat, Jean de Charpentier, Heinrich Carl Küster, Johann Rudolf Albert Mousson, Ludwig Karl Georg Pfeiffer and Emil Adolf Rossmässler. In the second half of the 19th century, the famous German malacologists Oskar Boettger and Wilhelm Kobelt from the Senckenberg Museum in Frankfurt intensified the malacological research in Turkey, with contributions by Gottfried Nägele, Otto von Retowski and Carl Agardh Westerlund. After Kobelt’s death in 1916, the "Golden Age" of malacology was finished except for some contributions by Paul Hesse, Wassili Adolfovitch Lindholm and Otto W. von Rosen. After almost 50 years of scientific silence, it was the "Netherlands biological expedition to Turkey 1959", which again shifted the focus of malacologists to Turkey. Since then, the malacological science received an enormous boost and stimulated both international as well as Turkish scientists to deepen the knowledge of the Turkish malacofauna. During this period, which now lasts about 50 years, one third of the number of taxa accepted today as valid has been added! Some of the most active contributors to this success should be mentioned here (in alphabetic order of the surnames): R. A. Bank; G. Falkner; L. Forcart; E. Gittenberger; Z. P. Erőss; Z. Fehér; B. A. Gümüş; B. Hausdorf; V. Hudec; H.P.M.G. Menkhorst; L. Németh; E. Neubert; H. Nordsieck; B. Páll-Gergely; W. Rähle; A. Riedel; H. Schütt; R. Şeşen; M.I. Szekeres; A. Wiktor and M. Z. Yıldırım.

== Freshwater gastropods ==
Neritidae

- Theodoxus fluviatilis (Linnaeus, 1758)
  - Theodoxus fluviatilis fluviatilis (Linnaeus, 1789)
  - Theodoxus fluviatilis euxinus (Clessin, 1885)
- Theodoxus heldreichi (Martens, 1879)
  - Theodoxus heldreichi heldreichi (Martens, 1879)
  - Theodoxus heldreichi fluvicola Schütt & Seşen, 1992
- Theodoxus anatolicus (Recluz, 1841)
- Theodoxus syriacus (Bourguignat, 1852)
- Theodoxus altenai Schütt, 1965
- Theodoxus jordani (Sowerby, 1832)
- Theodoxus cinctellus (Martens, 1874)

Viviparidae

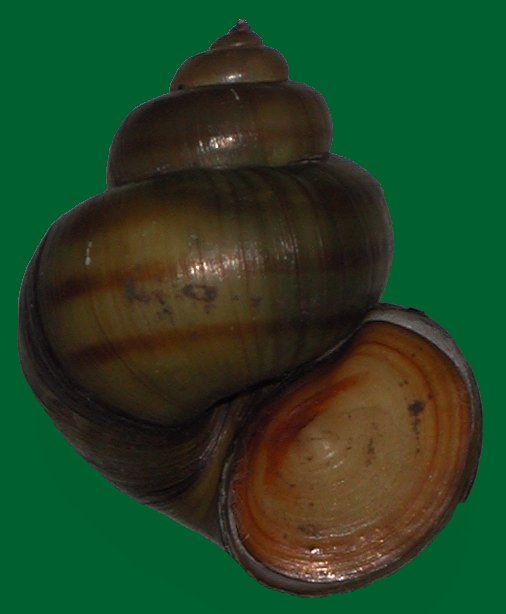
A shell of Viviparus contectus

- Viviparus mamillatus (Küster, 1852)
- Viviparus contectus (Millet, 1813)
- Viviparus viviparus costae (Mousson, 1863)

Thiaridae

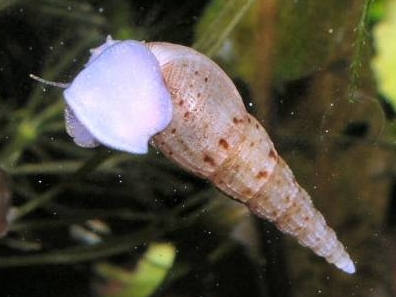
Melanoides tuberculata

- Melanoides tuberculata (O. F. Müller, 1774) - red-rimmed melania

Melanopsidae

- Melanopsis praemorsa (Linnaeus, 1789)
  - Melanopsis praemorsa praemorsa (Linnaeus, 1789)
  - Melanopsis praemorsa ferussaci Roth, 1839
  - Melanopsis praemorsa maximalis Schütt, 1974
- Melanopsis buccinoidea (Olivier, 1801)
- Melanopsis costata (Olivier, 1804)
  - Melanopsis costata costata (Olivier, 1804)
  - Melanopsis costata chantrei Locard, 1921
- Melanopsis nodosa Férussac, 1823
- Esperiana esperi (A. Férussac, 1823)
- Esperiana sangarica Schütt, 1974
- Microcolpia daudebartii stussineri Schütt, 1974

Bithyniidae

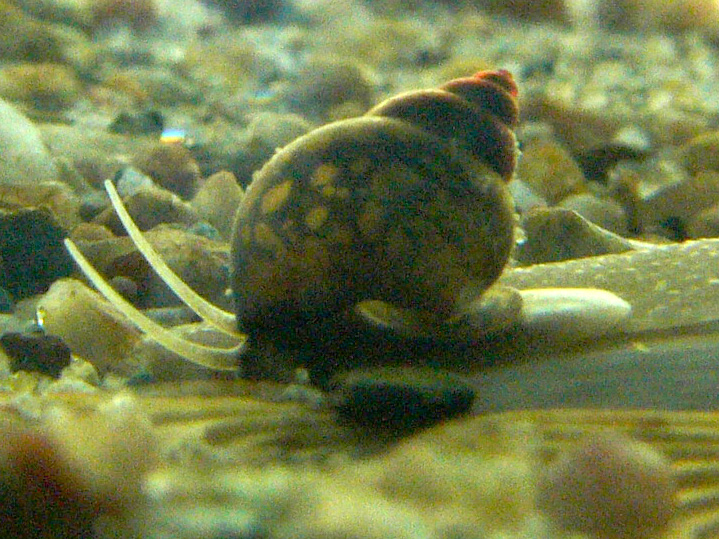
Bithynia tentaculata

- Bithynia tentaculata (Linnaeus, 1758)
- Bithynia leachii (Sheppard, 1823)
- Bithynia pseudemmericia Schütt, 1964
- Bithynia phialensis (Conrad, 1852)
- Bithynia badiella (Küster, 1852)
- Bithynia kayrae Odabaşı & Odabaşı, 2017
- Bithynia pentheri Sturany, 1905
- Bithynia pesici - Note: listed by Şereflişan (2009), but not listed by Yildirim (2006)
- Bithynia timmii Odabaşı & Arslan, 2015
- Bithynia yildirimi Glöer & Georgiev, 2012
- Pseudobithynia adiyamanensis Gürlek, 2017
- Pseudobithynia pentheri (Sturany, 1904)
- Pseudobithynia yildirimi (Odabaşı, Kebapçı & Akbulut, 2013)

Hydrobiidae

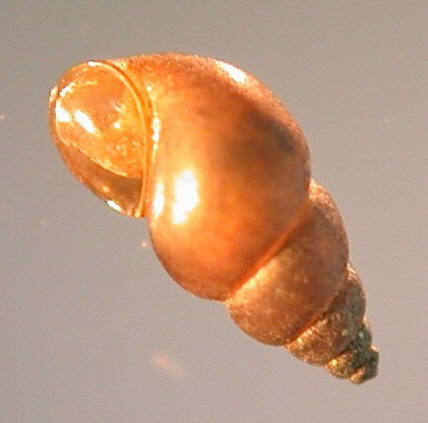
A shell of Potamopyrgus antipodarum

- Potamopyrgus antipodarum J. E. Gray, 1843 - non-indigenous - New Zealand mud snail
- Ecrobia ventrosa (Montagu, 1803)
- Hydrobia stagnorum (Gmelin, 1790)
- Peringia ulvae (Pennant, 1777)
- Hydrobia soosi (Wagner, 1928)
- Hydrobia anatolica Schütt, 1965
- Pseudamnicola bilgini Schütt, 1993
- Pseudamnicola cirikorum Odabaşi, Odabaşi & Acar, 2019
- Pseudamnicola geldiayana Schütt, 1970
- Pseudamnicola intranodosa Schütt, 1993
- Pseudamnicola radeae Odabaşi, Odabaşi & Acar, 2019
- Pyrgorientalia zilchi (Schütt, 1964)
- Grossuana kayrae Odabaşi, Odabaşi & Acar, 2019
- Isparta felei Yildirim, Koca, Gürlek & Glöer, 2018
- Kirelia carinata Radoman, 1973
- Kirelia murtici Radoman, 1973
- Falsipyrgula pfeiferi (Weber, 1927)
- Falsipyrgula beysehirana (Schütt, 1965)
- Falsipyrgula schuetti Yildirim, 1999
- Horatia parvula (Naegele, 1894)
- Pseudorientalia ceriti Gürlek, 2017
- Pseudorientalia natolica (Küster, 1852)
  - Pseudorientalia natolica natolica (Küster, 1852)
  - Pseudorientalia natolica smyrnensis Schütt, 1970
- Falsibelgrandiella bunarica Radoman, 1973
- Tefennia tefennica Schütt & Yildirim, 2003 - Tefenni spring snail
- Orientalina caputlacus Schütt, 1993
- Turkorientalia anatolica Radoman, 1973
- Sheitanok amidicus Schütt & Şeşen, 1991
- Graecoanatolica lacustristurca Radoman, 1973
- Graecoanatolica tenuis Radoman, 1973
- Graecoanatolica kocapinarica Radoman, 1973
- Graecoanatolica conica Radoman, 1973
- Graecoanatolica brevis Radoman, 1973
- Graecoanatolica pamphylica (Schütt, 1964)
- Heleobia longiscata (Bourguignat, 1856)
- Belgrandiella edessana Schütt, 1993
- Belgrandiella cavernica Boettger, 1957
- Belgrandiella adsharica (Lindholm, 1913)
- Sadleriana affinis (Frauenfeld, 1863)
- Sadleriana byzanthina (Küster, 1852)
  - Sadleriana byzanthina byzanthina (Küster, 1852)
  - Sadleriana byzanthina demirsoyii Yildirim & Morkoyunlu, 1997
- Sadleriana fluminensis (Küster, 1852)
- Sadleriana minuta (Naegele, 1903)
- Islamia pseudorientalica Radoman, 1973
- Islamia anatolica Radoman, 1973
- Islamia bunarbasa (Schütt, 1964)

Lithoglyphidae

- Lithoglyphus naticoides (C. Pfeiffer, 1828)

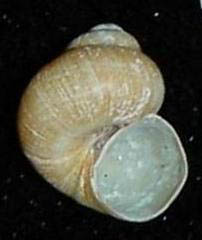
A shell of Valvata piscinalis

Bythinellidae

- Bythinella anatolica Yıldırım, Kebapçı & Bahadır Koca 2015
- Bythinella gokceadaensis Odabaşi, Odabaşi & Acar, 2019
- Bythinella istanbulensis Yıldırım, Kebapçı & Yüce 2015
- Bythinella kazdaghensis Odabaşı & Georgiev, 2014
- Bythinella magdalenae Yıldırım, Kebapçı & Bahadır Koca 2015
- Bythinella occasiuncula Boeters & Falkner, 2001
- Bythinella opaca Gallenstein, 1848
- Bythinella turca Radoman, 1976
- Bythinella wilkei Yıldırım, Kebapçı & Bahadır Koca 2015
- Bythinella yerlii Gürlek, 2017
- Bythinella sp. A - an unidentified species from Istanbul sensu Yildirim (2006)

Assimineidae

- Melarhaphe neritoides (delle Chiaje, 1828)

Valvatidae

- Valvata cristata O. F. Müller, 1774
- Valvata saulcyi Bourguignat, 1853
- Valvata macrostoma (Mörch, 1864)
- Valvata piscinalis (O. F. Müller, 1774)
- Borysthenia naticina (Menke, 1845)

(All species above this line are freshwater "Prosobranchia".)

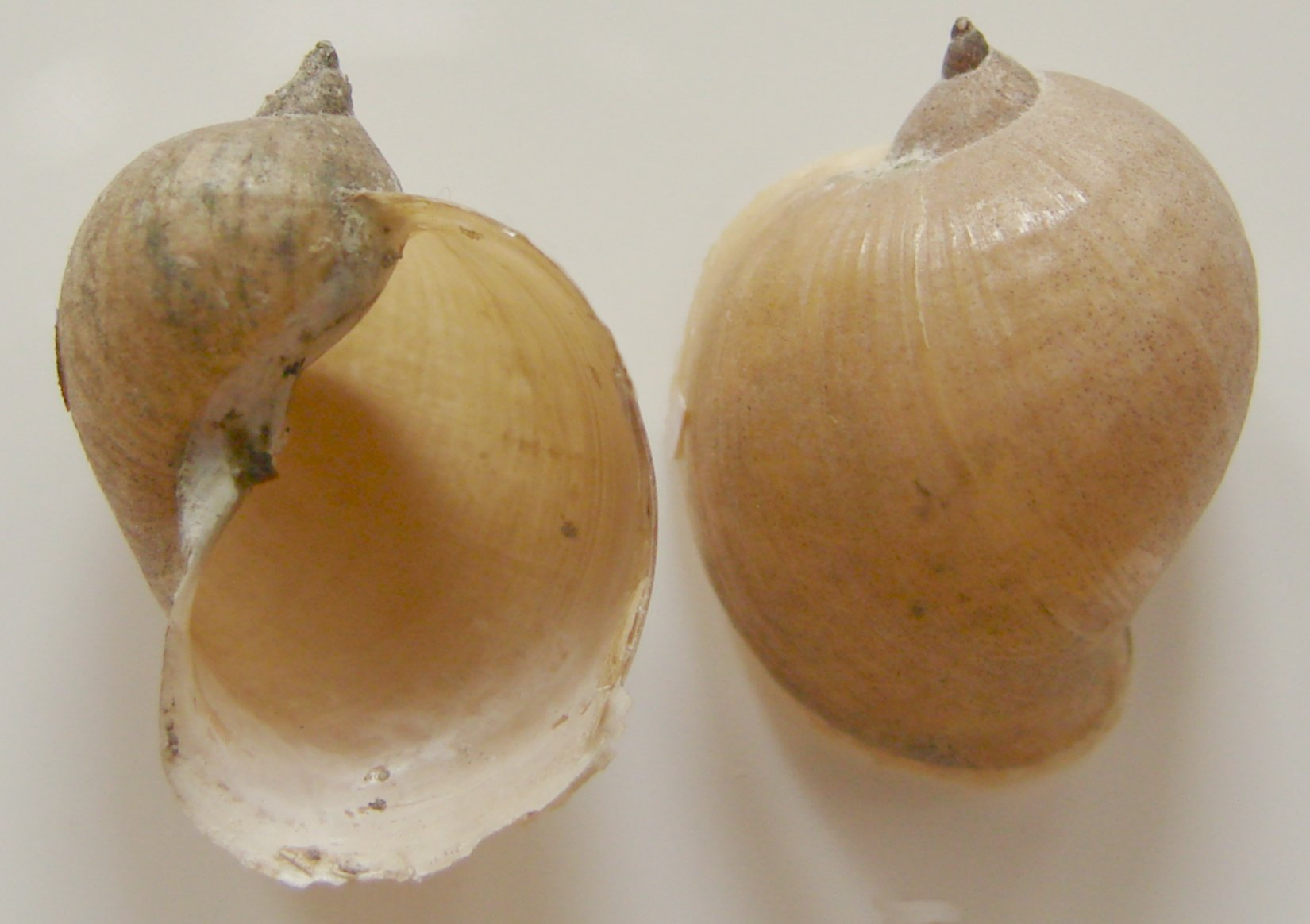
Two shells of Radix auricularia

Cochliopidae

- Heleobia contempta (Dautzenberg, 1894) / Semisalsa contempta (Dautzenberg, 1894)
- Heleobia longiscata (Bourguignat, 1856) / Semisalsa longiscata (Bourguignat, 1856)

Physidae

- Physella acuta (Draparnaud, 1805)

Planorbidae

- Anisus leucostoma (Millet, 1813)
- Anisus spirorbis (Linnaeus, 1758)
- Anisus vortex (Linnaeus, 1758)
- Anisus vorticulus (Troschel, 1834)
- Gyraulus albus (O. F. Müller, 1774)
- Gyraulus euphraticus (Mousson, 1874)
- Gyraulus pamphylicus Glöer & Rähle, 2007
- Gyraulus parvus (Say, 1817)
- Gyraulus piscinarum (Bourguignat, 1852)
- Planorbis planorbis (Linnaeus, 1758)

Lymnaeidae

- Galba truncatula (O. F. Müller, 1774)
- Lymnaea stagnalis (Linnaeus, 1758)
- Radix auricularia (Linnaeus, 1758)
- Radix peregra (O. F. Müller, 1774) - synonym: Radix labiata (Rossmässler, 1835)

Ellobiidae

- Myosotella myosotis (Draparmaud, 1801) - semi-marine

== Land gastropods ==
Ellobiidae

- Leucophytia bidentata (Montagu, 1808) - semi-marine species

Truncatellidae

- Truncatella subcylindrica (Linnaeus, 1767)

Succineidae

- Oxyloma elegans (Risso, 1826)

Pyramidulidae

- Pyramidula cephalonica (Westerlund, 1898)
- Pyramidula chorismenostoma (Westerlund & Blanc, 1879)
- Pyramidula pusilla (Vallot, 1801)

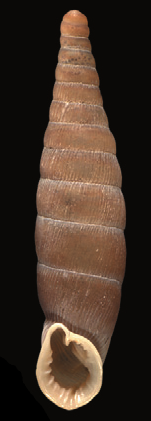
Shell of Bulgarica denticulata (Olivier, 1801) from family Clausiliidae

Clausiliidae

175 species of Clausiliidae in Turkey. Turkey is home to 95% of the subfamily Mentissoideinae.

- Albinaria caerulea maculata (Rossmässler, 1836)
- Albinaria discolor (Pfeiffer, 1846)
- Albinaria latelamellaris Neubert, Örstan & Welter-Schultes, 2000
- Bulgarica denticulata (Olivier, 1801)
- Bulgarica erberi (Frauenfeld, 1867)
- Cotyorica nemethi Grego & Szekeres, 2017
- Nothoserrulina subterranea Németh & Szekeres, 1995
- Papillifera bidens (Linnaeus, 1758) - synonym: Papillifera papillaris (O. F. Müller, 1774)
- Pontophaedusa funiculum (Mousson, 1856)
- Pontophaedusella ofensis Nordsieck, 1994
- Sprattia sowerbyana O. Boettger, 1883

Ferussaciidae

- Cecilioides acicula (Müller, 1774)

Achatinidae

- Rumina saharica Pallary, 1901

Pupillidae

- Pupilla triplicata (Studer, 1820)

Lauriidae

- Lauria cylindracea (Da Costa, 1778)

Orculidae

41 species of Orculidae in Turkey

- Alvariella
  - Alvariella multiplicata Hausdorf 1996
- Orcula
  - Orcula zilchi Urbański, 1960
- Orculella
  - Orculella bulgarica bulgarica (P. Hesse 1915)
  - Orculella bulgarica lamellata Hausdorf, 1996
  - Orculella critica Hausdorf, 1996
  - Orculella garzanensis Schütt, 1996
  - Orculella? heterostropha commagenensis (Neubert, 1988)
  - Orculella? heterostropha heterostropha (O. Boettger, 1905)
  - Orculella ignorata Hausdorf, 1996
  - Orculella menkhorsti menkhorsti Hausdorf, 1996
  - Orculella menkhorsti sinistrorsa Hausdorf, 1996
  - Orculella mesopotamica mesopotamica (Mousson, 1874)
  - Orculella mesopotamica riedeli Hausdorf, 1996
  - Orculella orientalis (L. Pfeiffer 1861)
  - Orculella? palatalis (Pilsbry 1922)
  - Orculella pfeiferi Hausdorf 1996
  - Orculella ruderalis urartaeica Hausdorf 1996
  - Orculella sirianocoriensis libanotica (Tristram 1865)
- Pagodulina hauseri E.Gittenberger, 1978
- Pagodulina pisidica Schütt, 1993
- Pagodulina sparsa Pilsbry, 1924
- Pagodulina subdola (Gredler, 1856)
- Pilorcula Germain, 1912
  - Pilorcula trifilaris anatolica Hausdorf, 1996
  - Pilorcula trifilaris longior Hausdorf, 1996
- Schileykula
  - Schileykula aculeata E. Gittenberger & Menkhorst, 1993
  - Schileykula attilae Páll-Gergely, 2010
  - Schileykula batumensis (Retowski, 1889)
  - Schileykula inversa Schütt, 1993
  - Schileykula nordsiecki Hausdorf, 1996
  - Schileykula (?) robusta (Nägele, 1910)
  - Schileykula scyphus cilicica Hausdorf, 1996
  - Schileykula scyphus enteroplax (Pilsbry, 1922)
  - Schileykula scyphus erecta Hausdorf, 1996
  - Schileykula scyphus lycaonica Hausdorf, 1996
  - Schileykula scyphus scyphus (L. Pfeiffer, 1848)
  - Schileykula sigma Hausdorf, 1996
  - Schileykula trapezensis acampsis Hausdorf, 1996
  - Schileykula trapezensis contraria Neubert, 1993
  - Schileykula trapezensis neuberti Hausdorf, 1996
  - Schileykula trapezensis trapezensis (Stojaspal, 1981)
- Sphyradium
  - Sphyradium doliolum (Bruguière, 1792)

Chondrinidae

- Granopupa granum (Draparnaud, 1801)
- Rupestrella rhodia (Roth, 1839)

Pleurodiscidae

- Pleurodiscus balmei (Potiez & Michaud, 1838)

Truncatellinidae

- Truncatellina callicratis (Scacchi, 1833)
- Truncatellina cylindrica (A. Férussac, 1807)

Valloniidae

- Vallonia pulchella (O. F. Müller, 1774)

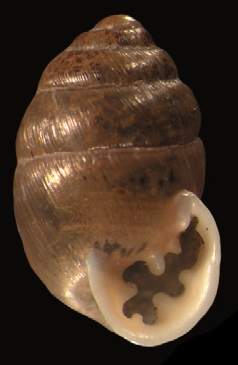
Shell of Multidentula ovularis (Olivier, 1801) from family Enidae

Enidae

- Enormous radiation of the family Enidae on the Macaronesian Islands: 115 species of Enidae in Turkey
- Chondrula lycaonica (Sturany, 1904)
- Chondrula orientalis (Pfeiffer, 1848)
- Chondrula sturmii (Küster, 1852)
- Chondrula werneri (Sturany, 1902)
- Chondrus tournefortianus (Férussac, 1821)
- Ena dazimonensis Hausdorf & Bank, 2001
- Ena frivaldskyi (L. Pfeiffer, 1847)
- Ena menkhorsti Hausdorf & Bank, 2001
- Ena nogellii (Roth, 1850) - synonym: Buliminus ponticus Retowski, 1886
- Imparietula ridvani Schütt, 1995
- Jaminia loewii (Philippi, 1844)
  - Jaminia loewii godetiana (Kobelt, 1880)
- Mastus rossmaessleri (Pfeiffer, 1847)
- Meijeriella raynevaliana (Bourguignat, 1855)
- Multidentula ovularis (Olivier, 1801)
- Pseudojaminia seductilis (Rossmässler, 1837)
- Zebrina (Rhabdoena) cosensis (Reeve, 1849)

Punctidae

- Paralaoma servilis (Shuttleworth, 1852)
- Punctum pygmaeum (Draparnaud, 1801)

Arionidae

- Arion ater s.l.

Oxychilidae

- 45 species of Oxychilidae in Turkey
- Mediterranea depressa (Sterki, 1880)
- Mediterranea hydatina (Rossmässler, 1838)
- Morlina moussoni (Kobelt, 1878)
- Nastia viridula Riedel, 1989 - north-eastern Turkey
- Oxychilus cyprius (Pfeiffer, 1847)
- Oxychilus hydatinus (Rossmässler, 1838)
- Schistophallus investigatus (A. Riedel, 1993)

Pristilomatidae

- Vitrea contracta (Westerlund, 1871)
- Vitrea pygmaea (Boettger, 1880)
- Vitrea riedeli Damjanov et Pintér, 1969
- Vitrea storchi Pintér, 1978

Zonitidae

- Zonites algirus (Linnaeus, 1758)
- Zonites smyrnensis (Roth, 1839)

Trigonochlamydidae

- Drilolestes retowskii (O. Boettger, 1884)
- Selenochlamys pallida O. Boettger, 1883
- Trigonochlamys imitatrix O. Boettger, 1881

Milacidae

- Tandonia budapestensis (Hazay, 1880)

Limacidae

- Ambigolimax valentianus (A. Ferussac, 1822)

Agriolimacidae

- Deroceras turcicum (Simroth, 1894)

Helicodontidae

- Lindholmiola lens (Férussac, 1832)

Geomitridae

- Cernuella virgata (Da Costa, 1778)
- Microxeromagna lowei (Potiez et Michaud, 1838)
- Trochoidea pyramidata (Draparnaud, 1805)
- Trochoidea trochoides (Poiret, 1789)
- Xeropicta krynickii (Krynicki, 1833)

Hygromiidae

Turkey has 112 species of Hygromiidae and it is strong for several endemic genera of Hygromiidae.

- Harmozica occidentalis Hausdorf, 2004
- Metafruticicola dedegoelensis Hausdorf, Gümüş & Yildirim, 2004
- Metafruticicola oerstani Hausdorf, Gümüş & Yildirim, 2004
- Metafruticicola pellita (A. Férussac, 1832)
- Metafruticicola redtenbacheri (Pfeiffer, 1856)
- Monacha claustralis (Menke, 1828)
- Monacha gemina Hausdorf, 2000
- Monacha georgievi Páll-Gergely, 2010
- Monacha liebegottae (Hausdorf, 2000)
- Monacha ocellata (Roth, 1839)
- Monacha oecali Hausdorf & Páll-Gergely, 2009
- Monacha phazimonitica Hausdorf, 2000
- Monacha syriaca (Ehrenberg, 1831)
- Monacha tibarenica Neiber & Hausdorf, 2017

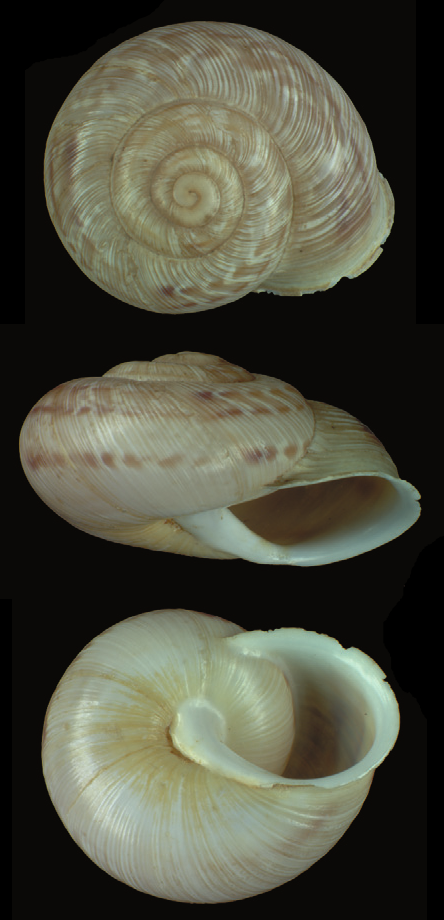
Three views of a shell of Assyriella guttata (Olivier, 1804) from family Helicidae

Helicidae

Turkey has 52 species of the subfamily Helicinae.

- Levantina guttata (Olivier, 1804)
- Cantareus apertus (Born, 1778)
- Cornu aspersum (Müller, 1774)
- Eobania vermiculata (Müller, 1774)
- Helicigona matrella (Westerlund, 1898)
- Helix asemnis Bourguignat, 1860
- Helix cincta Müller, 1774
- Helix figulina Rossmässler, 1839
- Helix lucorum Linnaeus, 1758
- Helix nucula Mousson, 1854
- Helix pomacella Mousson, 1854

Trissexodontidae

- Caracollina lenticula (Michaud, 1831)

== Bivalves ==
Unionidae

- Unio stevenianus Krynicki, 1837
- Unio terminalis
  - Unio terminalis delicatus (Lea, 1863)

Sphaeriidae

- Euglesa subtruncata Malm, 1855

Dreissenidae

- Dreissena polymorpha (Pallas, 1771) - zebra mussel

== See also ==
Lists of molluscs of surrounding countries:

- List of non-marine molluscs of Bulgaria
- List of non-marine molluscs of Greece
- List of non-marine molluscs of Georgia (country)
- List of non-marine molluscs of Armenia
- List of non-marine molluscs of Azerbaijan
- List of non-marine molluscs of Iran
- List of non-marine molluscs of Iraq
- List of non-marine molluscs of Syria
- List of non-marine molluscs of Cyprus
