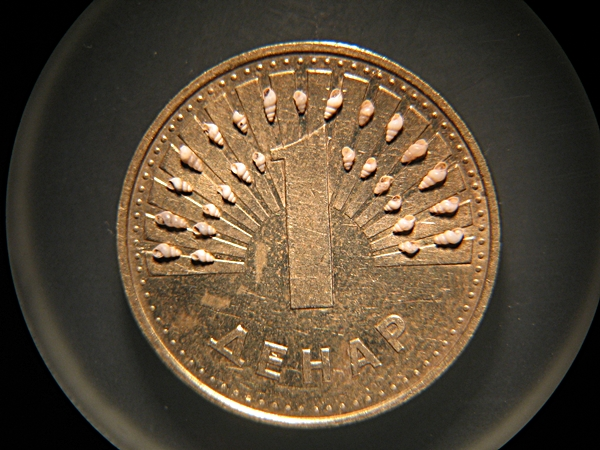
- Graecoanatolica macedonica

Scientific classification
- Domain: Eukaryota
- Kingdom: Animalia
- Phylum: Mollusca
- Class: Gastropoda
- Subclass: Caenogastropoda
- Order: Littorinimorpha
- Family: Hydrobiidae
- Subfamily: Belgrandiinae
- Genus: Graecoanatolica; Radoman, 1973

Type species
- Hydrobia vegorriticola Schütt, 1962

= Graecoanatolica =

Genus of gastropods

Graecoanatolica is a genus of small freshwater snails, aquatic gastropod mollusks in the family Hydrobiidae.

== Species ==
Species within the genus Graecoanatolica are as follows:

- Graecoanatolica anatolica Schütt, 1965
- Graecoanatolica brevis Radoman, 1973
- Graecoanatolica conica Radoman, 1973
- †Graecoanatolica denizliensis (Taner, 1974)
- Graecoanatolica dinarica Kebpaçi, Koca & Yilidrim, 2012
- Graecoanatolica kocapinarica Radoman, 1973
- Graecoanatolica lacustristurca Radoman, 1973
- †Graecoanatolica macedonica Radoman & Stanovic, 1978
- Graecoanatolica nageli Glöer & Pešić, 2015
- Graecoanatolica pamphylica Schutt, 1964
- Graecoanatolica tenuis Radoman, 1973
- Graecoanatolica vegorriticola (Schütt, 1962)
- Graecoanatolica yildirimi Glöer & Pešić, 2015
