= Bulgarica cana =

Scientific classification
- Domain: Eukaryota
- Kingdom: Animalia
- Phylum: Mollusca
- Class: Gastropoda
- Order: Stylommatophora
- Family: Clausiliidae
- Genus: Bulgarica
- Species: B. cana

Binomial name
- Bulgarica cana (Held, 1836)

Species of gastropod

Bulgarica cana is a species of air-breathing land snail, a terrestrial pulmonate gastropod mollusk in the family Clausiliidae, the door snails.

== Distribution ==
This species occurs in:

- Czech Republic
- Poland
- Slovakia
- Ukraine
- Latvia
