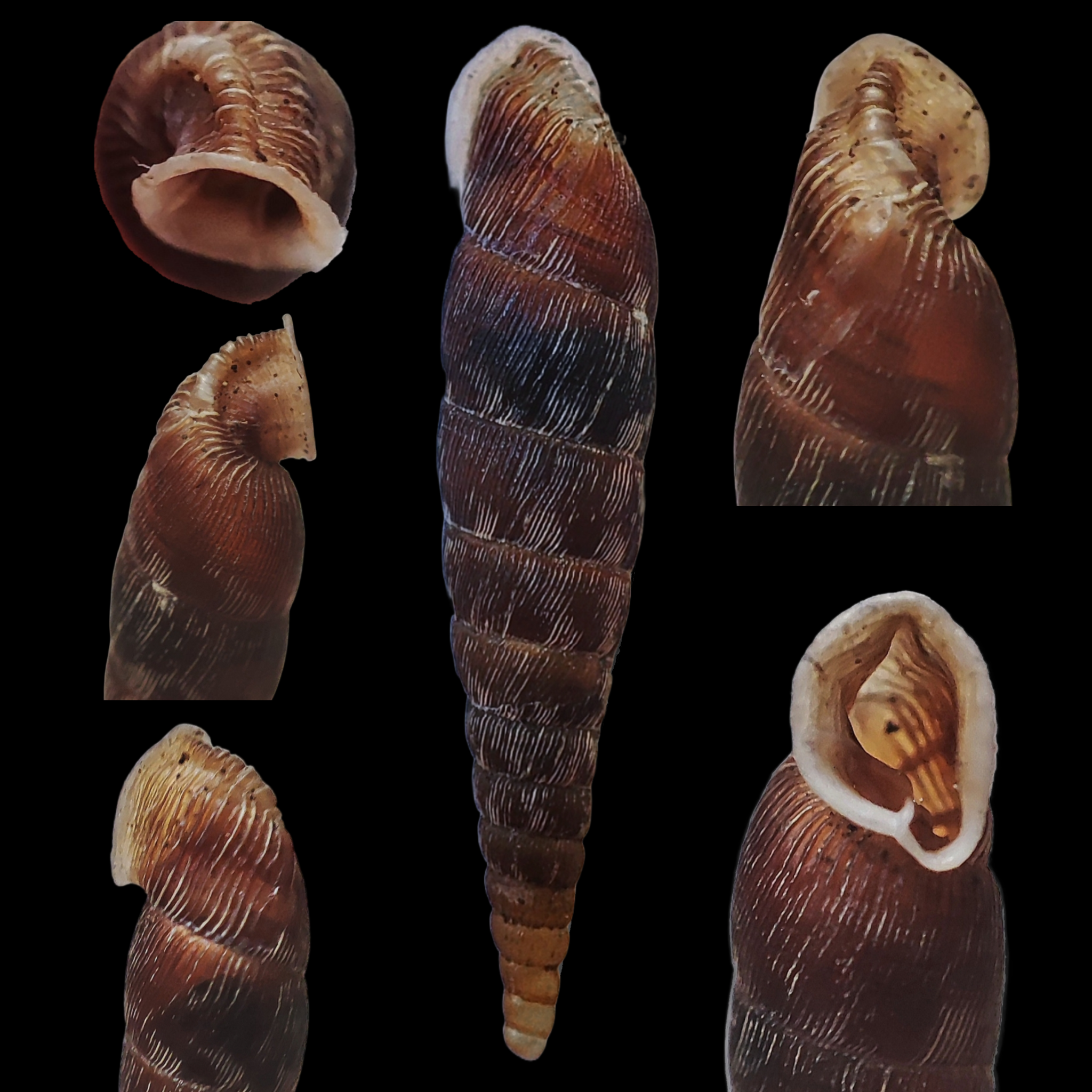
- Galeata schwerzenbachii

Scientific classification
- Kingdom: Animalia
- Phylum: Mollusca
- Class: Gastropoda
- Order: Stylommatophora
- Family: Clausiliidae
- Subfamily: Clausiliinae
- Tribe: Mentissoideini
- Genus: Galeata; O. Boettger, 1877

Type species
- Clausilia galeata Rossmässler, 1839

Synonyms
- Clausilia (Galeata) O. Boettger, 1877; Pleioptychia A. J. Wagner, 1913; Plistoptychia Lindholm, 1924

= Galeata (gastropod) =

Genus of door snails

Galeata (from Latin galeāta, "helmeted") is a West Asian genus of small, air-breathing land snails, terrestrial pulmonate gastropod molluscs in the family Clausiliidae, commonly known as door snails. The genus is mainly recorded from Anatolia, including north-western, northern, and southern Turkey.

Like other clausiliids, members of the genus have slender, sinistral (left-coiling) shells and a specialised internal closing apparatus, the clausilium.

== Taxonomy ==
Galeata was established by Oskar Boettger in 1877. Its type species, Clausilia galeata Rossmässler, 1839, is currently accepted as Galeata galeata (Rossmässler, 1839).

Several names have been associated with the genus or with taxa now placed in it. Clausilia (Galeata) was originally used as a subgeneric combination. Pleioptychia A. J. Wagner, 1913 was proposed for Clausilia (Euxina) cilicica. Plistoptychia Lindholm, 1924 was afterwards proposed as a replacement name for the preoccupied Pleioptychia. These names are now regarded as synonyms of Galeata.

Galeata antiochica was originally described as Cristataria strangulata antiochica Schütt, 1993, and was later listed under Galeata.

== Species ==
The following species are accepted in the genus

Scientific name	Distribution
Galeata amanica H. Nordsieck, 2004	Turkey (Hatay Province, Payas-Hassa area)
Galeata antiochica (Schütt, 1993)	Turkey (Hatay Province, near İskenderun)
Galeata cilicica (Nägele, 1902)	Turkey (southern Anatolia; Kozan area, Adana Province)
Galeata galeata (Rossmässler, 1839)	Turkey (southern Anatolia; Gülek area); type locality historically cited as "Syria near Baalbek" (modern Lebanon)
Galeata schwerzenbachii (L. Pfeiffer, 1848)	Turkey (north-western Anatolia and the Black Sea Region, doubtful record from southern Anatolia)
Galeata tumluensis H. Nordsieck, 1994	Turkey (Adana Province, Tumlu Castle near Sağkaya)
