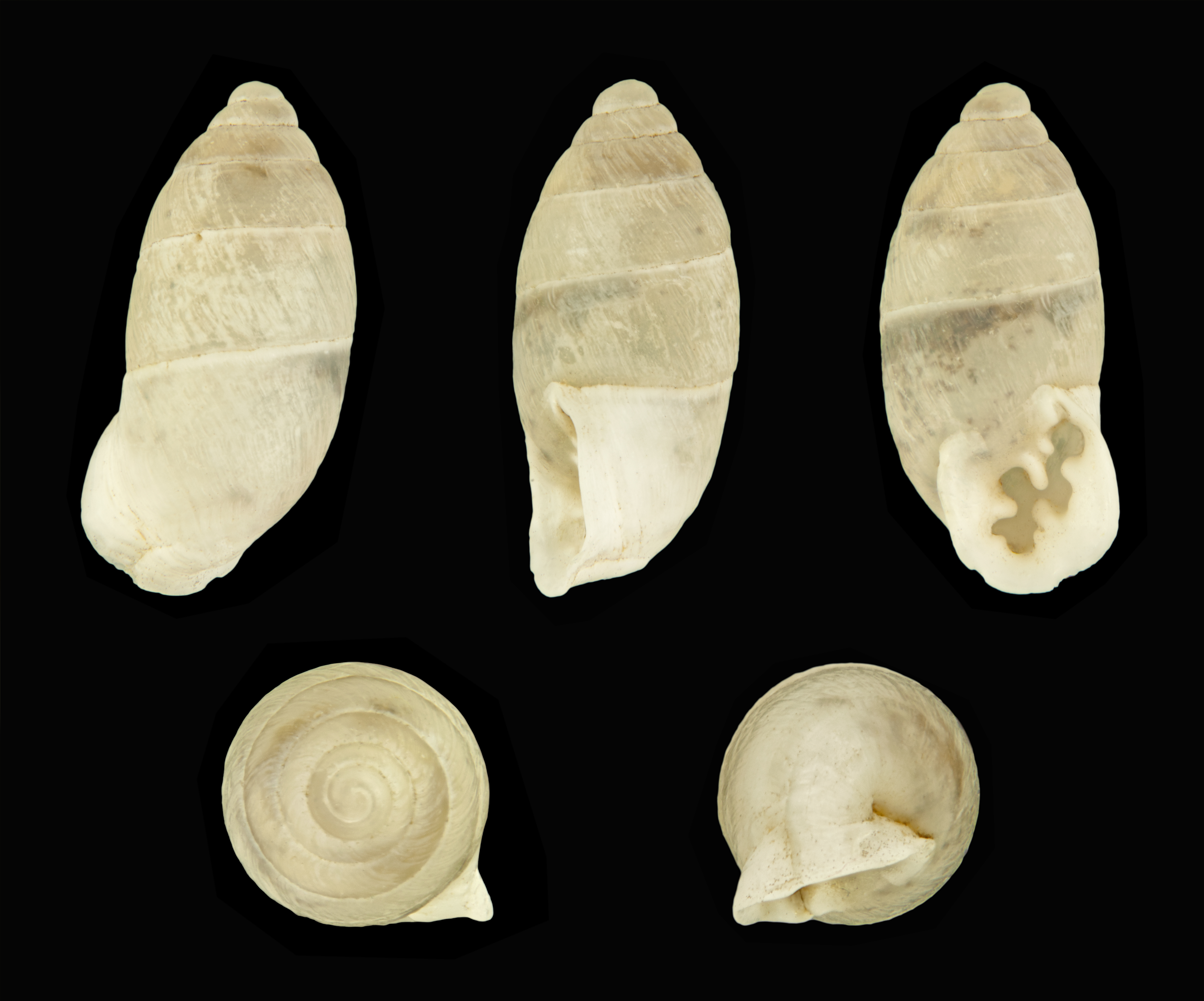
- Euchondrus septemdentatus (Roth, 1839)

Scientific classification
- Kingdom: Animalia
- Phylum: Mollusca
- Class: Gastropoda
- Order: Stylommatophora
- Family: Enidae
- Genus: Euchondrus; Boettger, 1883

Species
- See text

= Euchondrus =

Genus of gastropods

Euchondrus is a genus of very small air-breathing land snails, terrestrial pulmonate gastropod mollusks in the family Enidae.

== Distribution ==
The snails in this genus are of levantine distribution, which includes Cyprus, Turkey, Syria, Israel and Jordan.

== Shell description ==
The gastropod shell of Euchondrus is 6.5–13 mm in height in Euchondrus parreyssi, that has very variable size in Euchondrus. The shell is elongate with 5-7 whorls and a high spire. The aperture is toothed.

== Ecology ==
This snail species lives in open habitats, under limestone rocks in the desert.

Three species of Euchondrus in the Negev desert are noted for eating lichens growing under the surface limestone rocks and slabs (endolithic lichens). They disrupt and eat the limestone. Their grazing resulting in the weathering of the stones, and the subsequent formation of soil. They have a significant effect on the region: the total population of snails is estimated to process between 0.7 and 1.1 metric ton per hectare per year of limestone in the Negev desert.

== Species ==
Species within the genus Euchondrus include:

- Euchondrus albulus (Mousson, 1861)
- Euchondrus borealis (Mousson, 1874)
- Euchondrus chondriformis (Mousson, 1861) - type species
- Euchondrus desertorum Rochanab, 1981
- Euchondrus ledereri (L. Pfeiffer, 1868)
- Euchondrus limbodentatus (Mousson, 1854)
- Euchondrus nucifragus (L. Pfeiffer, 1848)
- Euchondrus parreyssi (L. Pfeiffer, 1846)
- Euchondrus ramonensis
- Euchondrus saulcyi (Bourguignat, 1852)
- Euchondrus septemdentatus (Roth, 1839)
