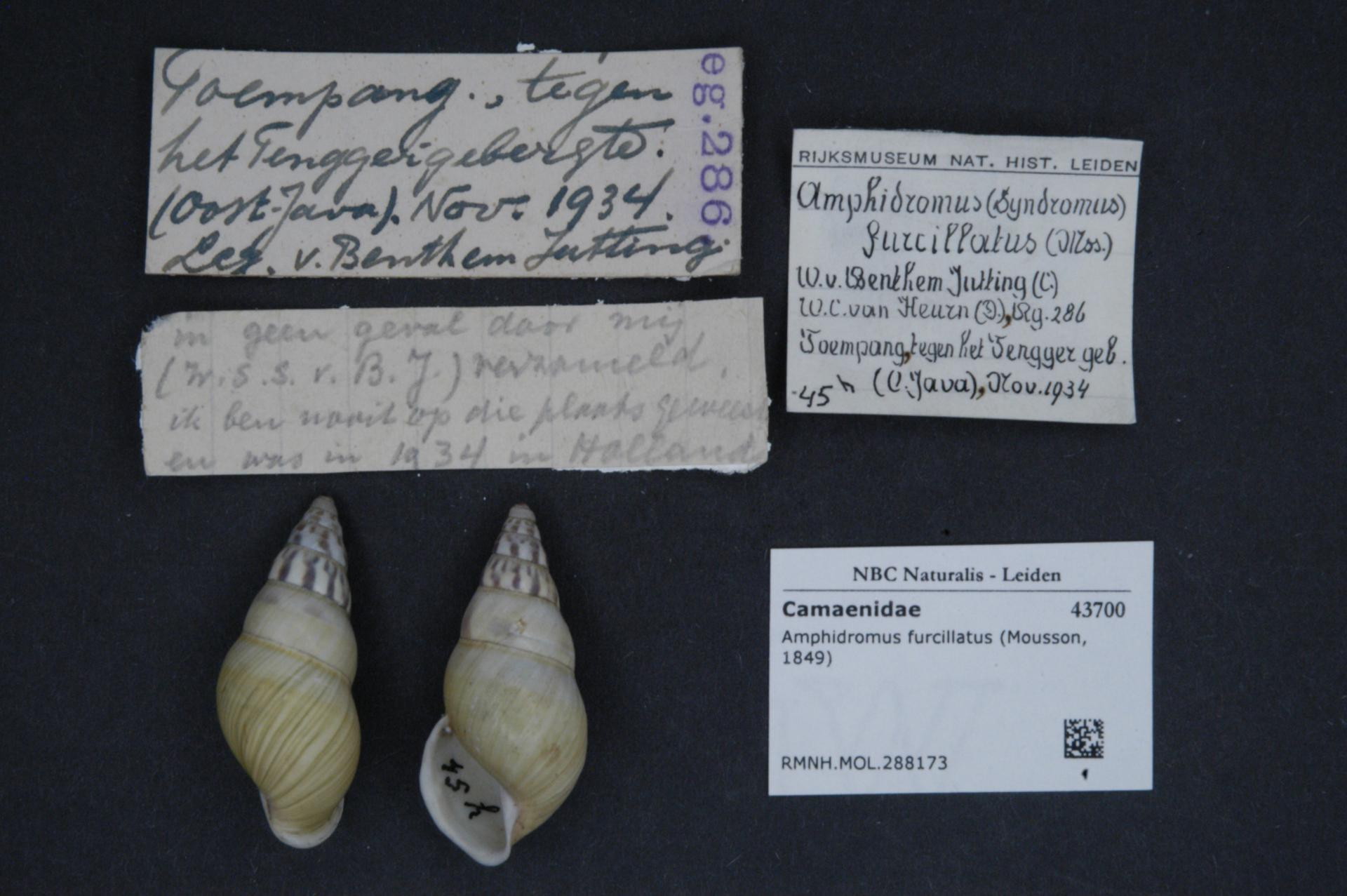
- Shell of Amphidromus furcillatus (specimen at Naturalis Biodiversity Center)

Scientific classification
- Kingdom: Animalia
- Phylum: Mollusca
- Class: Gastropoda
- Order: Stylommatophora
- Family: Camaenidae
- Genus: Amphidromus
- Species: A. furcillatus

Binomial name
- Amphidromus furcillatus (Mousson, 1849)

Synonyms
- Amphidromus (Syndromus) furcillatus (Mousson, 1849) alternative representation; Bulimus elegans Mousson, 1849 junior homonym (invalid; not Serres, 1844 nor L Pfeiffer, 1848); Bulimus furcillatus Mousson, 1849 (original name)

= Amphidromus furcillatus =

Species of snail in the family Camaenidae

Amphidromus furcillatus is a species of medium-sized air-breathing tree snail, an arboreal gastropod mollusk in the family Camaenidae.

== Description ==
The length of the shell attains 35 mm, its diameter 18.2 mm.

The sinistral shell is long-conic, subperforate, smooth, and glossy. It exhibits a buff-white base color with grayish-brown flames. Comprising seven a little convex and regularly increasing whorls, the shell features a black tip at the apex. The body whorl measures two-fifths of the total length and appears uniform or spirally two-banded below, while being flammulated above with flames that bifurcate or trifurcate before disappearing at the suture. The aperture is ovate and white, showing the bands through it; the parietal wall is yellowish. The peristome is thin, reflexed, and white, joining the straight and slender columella at an angle, nearly covering the perforation.

== Habitat ==
This species lives in trees.

== Distribution ==
The type locality of this species is Java, Indonesia.
