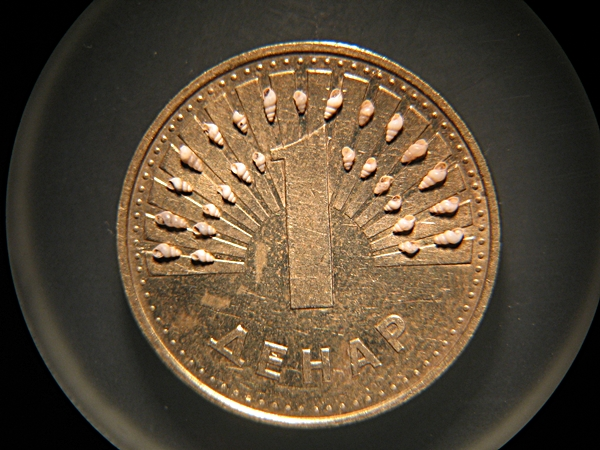
- Graecoanatolica macedonica from Lake Dojran, Rep. Macedonia, 2011.

Conservation status
- Extinct (IUCN 3.1)

Scientific classification
- Kingdom: Animalia
- Phylum: Mollusca
- Class: Gastropoda
- Subclass: Caenogastropoda
- Order: Littorinimorpha
- Family: Hydrobiidae
- Genus: Graecoanatolica
- Species: †G. macedonica

Binomial name
- †Graecoanatolica macedonica Radoman & Stanovic, 1978

= Graecoanatolica macedonica =

Extinct species of gastropod

Graecoanatolica macedonica is an extinct species of small freshwater snail, an aquatic gastropod mollusk in the family Hydrobiidae.

== Distribution ==
This species existed only in a single habitat, in Dojran Lake, situated on the border between Greece and what is today North Macedonia. The population of the snail began to decline in the 1970s. Researchers were unable to locate any members of the species after 1992, and it is now presumed extinct.
