= Pontophaedusa =

Scientific classification
- Kingdom: Animalia
- Phylum: Mollusca
- Class: Gastropoda
- Order: Stylommatophora
- Family: Clausiliidae
- Genus: Pontophaedusa; Lindholm, 1924

Genus of gastropods

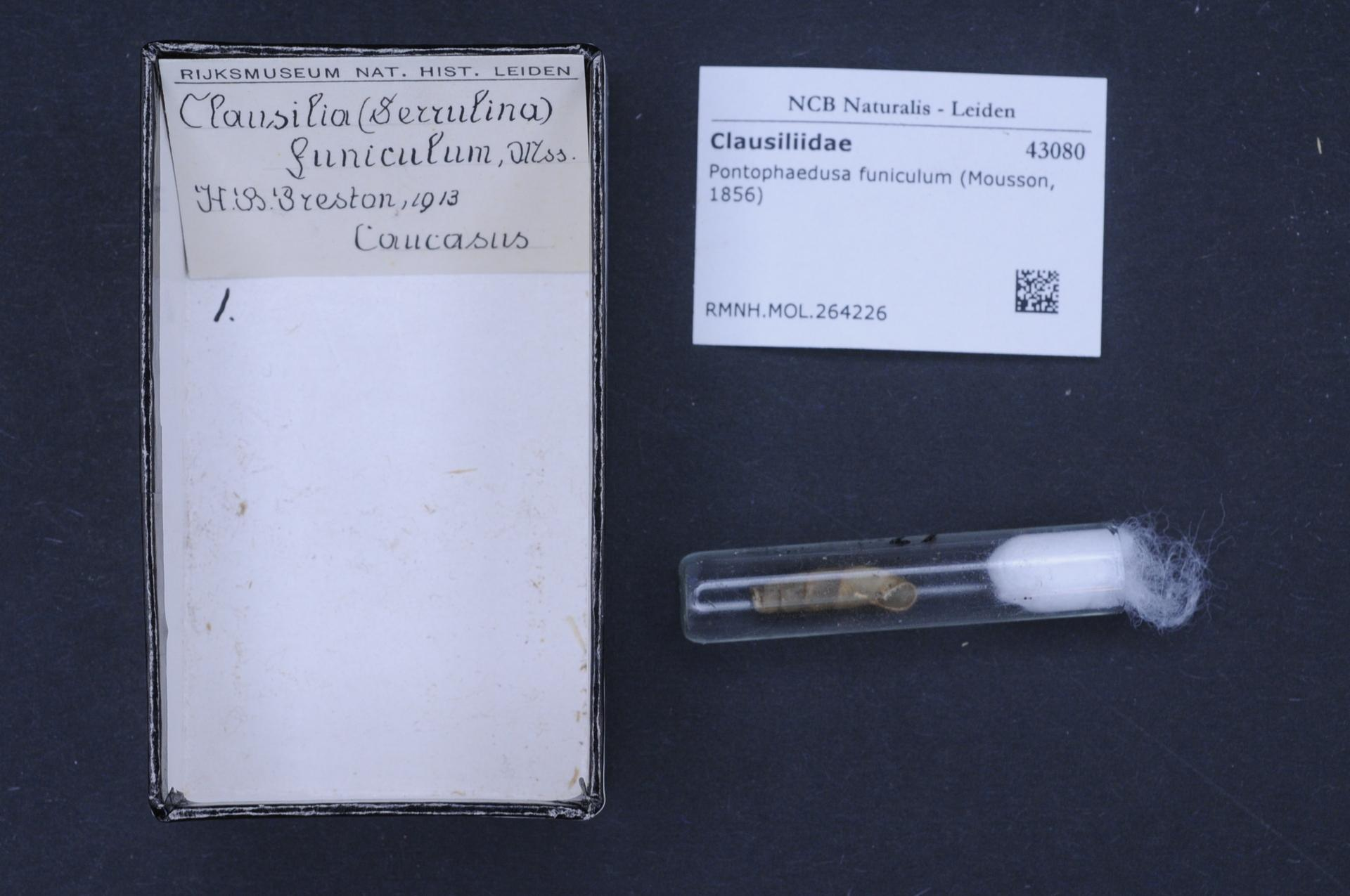
Pontophaedusa funiculum (Mousson, 1856)

Pontophaedusa is a genus of small air-breathing land snails, terrestrial pulmonate gastropod mollusk in the family Clausiliidae, the door snails. It is within the subfamily Serrulininae.

== Species ==
Species within the genus Pontophaedusa include:

- Pontophaedusa funiculum
