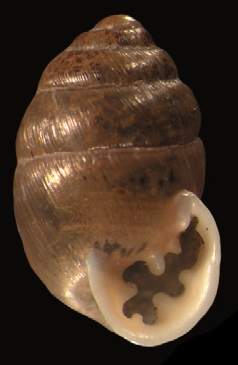
- A shell of Multidentula ovularis. Height of the shell is 5.1 mm.

Scientific classification
- Domain: Eukaryota
- Kingdom: Animalia
- Phylum: Mollusca
- Class: Gastropoda
- Order: Stylommatophora
- Family: Enidae
- Genus: Multidentula
- Species: M. ovularis

Binomial name
- Multidentula ovularis (Olivier, 1801)

= Multidentula ovularis =

Species of gastropod

Multidentula ovularis is a species of small air-breathing land snail, a terrestrial pulmonate gastropod mollusk in the family Enidae.

== Distribution ==
This species occurs in Turkey.
