= Euchondrus albulus =

Scientific classification
- Kingdom: Animalia
- Phylum: Mollusca
- Class: Gastropoda
- Order: Stylommatophora
- Family: Enidae
- Genus: Euchondrus
- Species: E. albulus

Binomial name
- Euchondrus albulus (Mousson, 1861)

Synonyms
- Chondrus septemdentatus var. albulus Mousson, 1861 superseded combination; Jaminia (Euchondrus) albula (Mousson, 1861) superseded combination

Species of gastropod

Euchondrus albulus is a gastropod (snail),

It is native to the Negev Desert of Israel. It eats lichens growing in cracks in limestone as its primary food source, using its raspy tongue to enlarge the cracks, moving an average of 1.1 tonnes of limestone per hectare per year.
