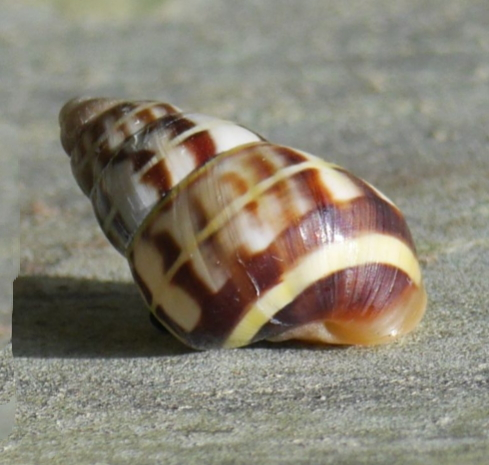
- Shell of Amphidromus porcellanus

Scientific classification
- Kingdom: Animalia
- Phylum: Mollusca
- Class: Gastropoda
- Order: Stylommatophora
- Family: Camaenidae
- Genus: Amphidromus
- Species: A. porcellanus

Binomial name
- Amphidromus porcellanus (Mousson, 1848)

Synonyms
- Amphidromus (Syndromus) porcellanus (Mousson, 1849) alternative representation; Bulimus porcellanus Mousson, 1849 superseded combination

= Amphidromus porcellanus =

Species of gastropod

Amphidromus porcellanus is a species of air-breathing land snail, a terrestrial pulmonate gastropod mollusc in the family Camaenidae.

Subspecies

- Amphidromus porcellanus gistingensis Dharma, 2021
- Amphidromus porcellanus porcellanus (Mousson, 1849)

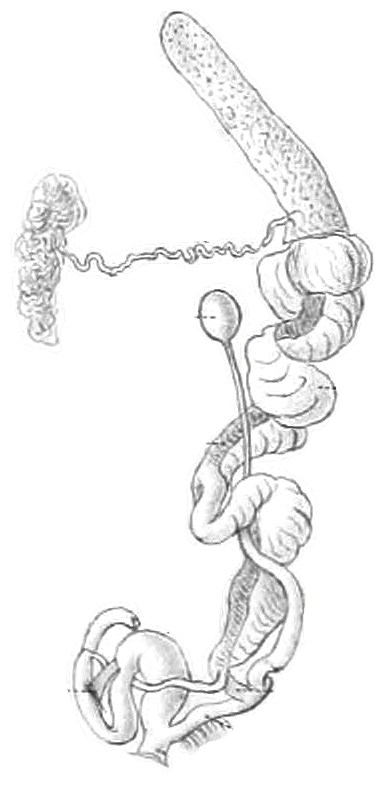
Reproductive system of Amphidromus porcellanus shows main characteristics of genus Amphidromus: long receptaculum seminis, and short penis with low insertion of retractor muscle. (See notes on the image.)

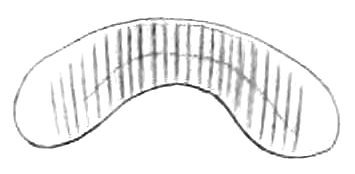
The jaw of the genus Amphidromus is thin and weak with low flat ribs as it is seen on this jaw of Amphidromus porcellanus.

== Description ==
(Original description in Latin) The sinistral shell is elongate-conical, appearing scarcely perforate. It is thin and very glossy. It is elegantly ornamented with yellowish-white spots and brown bands. Comprising six convex whorls that increase regularly, it features a very dark apex. The body whorl measures 2/5 the length of the shell, displaying two decurrent bands below and remote, simple flammules (flame-like markings) above, all intersected by a median white line. The aperture presents a broadly ovate shape with translucent diaphanous bands. The columella appears somewhat arched, and the peristome is slightly reflected and pure white.

== Anatomy ==
The anatomy of this species was described by Carl Arend Friedrich Wiegmann in 1898.

== Distribution ==
This species is endemic to Java, Indonesia.
