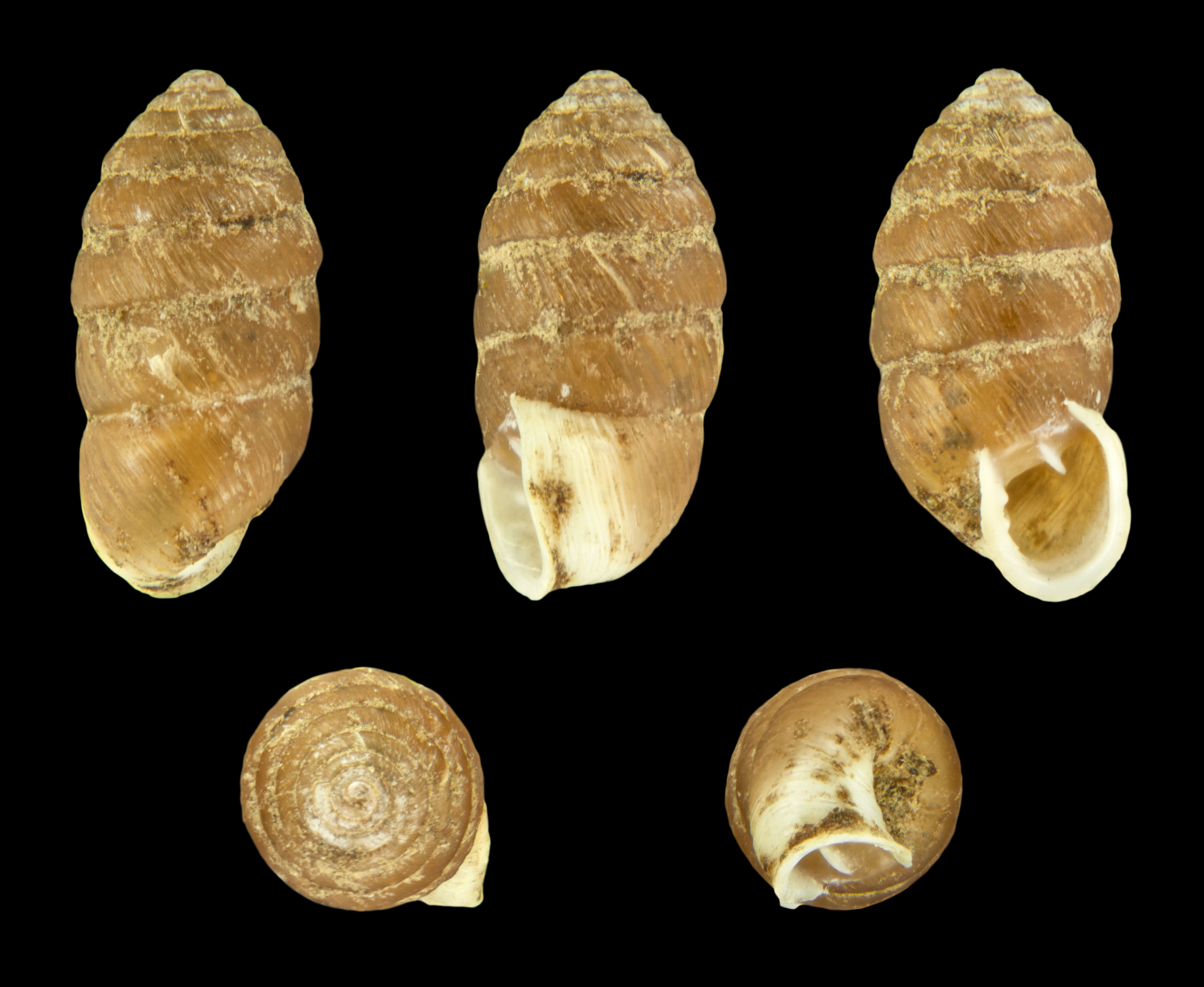

Scientific classification
- Kingdom: Animalia
- Phylum: Mollusca
- Class: Gastropoda
- Order: Stylommatophora
- Family: Orculidae
- Genus: Orcula
- Species: O. dolium

Binomial name
- Orcula dolium (Draparnaud, 1801)

Synonyms
- Orcula (Orcula) dolium (Draparnaud, 1801)· accepted, alternate representation; Pupa dolium Draparnaud, 1801 (original combination)

= Orcula dolium =

Species of gastropod

Orcula dolium is a species of very small air-breathing land snail, a terrestrial pulmonate gastropod mollusk in the family Orculidae.

Subspecies

- Orcula dolium dolium (Draparnaud 1801)
- Orcula dolium brancsiki Clessin 1887
- Orcula dolium cebratica Westerlund 1887
- Orcula dolium edita Ehrmann 1933
- Orcula dolium globulosa Locard 1880
- Orcula dolium gracilior Zimmermann 1932
- Orcula dolium gracilis (Hazay 1885)
- Orcula dolium implicata Clessin 1887
- Orcula dolium infima Ehrmann 1933
- Orcula dolium kimakowiczi (Brancsik 1887)
- Orcula dolium major Westerlund 1887
- Orcula dolium minima (Brancsik 1887)
- Orcula dolium minor (Moquin-Tandon 1855)
- Orcula dolium obesa (Westerlund 1887)
- Orcula dolium par (Westerlund 1887)
- Orcula dolium pfeifferi (Moquin-Tandon 1855)
- Orcula dolium pseudogularis A. J. Wagner 1912
- Orcula dolium quadriplicata (Locard 1880)
- Orcula dolium raxae Gittenberger 1978
- Orcula dolium tatrica A. J. Wagner 1922
- Orcula dolium titan (Brancsik 1887)
- Orcula dolium triplicata Clessin 1887
- Orcula dolium tumida (Hazay 1885)
- Orcula dolium uniplicata (Potiez & Michaud 1838)

Synonym

- Orcula dolium f. aragonica Westerlund, 1897: synonym of Orculella aragonica (Westerlund, 1897) (basionym)

== Distribution ==
This species occurs in the following countries:

- Czech Republic - in Moravia, vulnerable (VU)
- Slovakia
- and others
