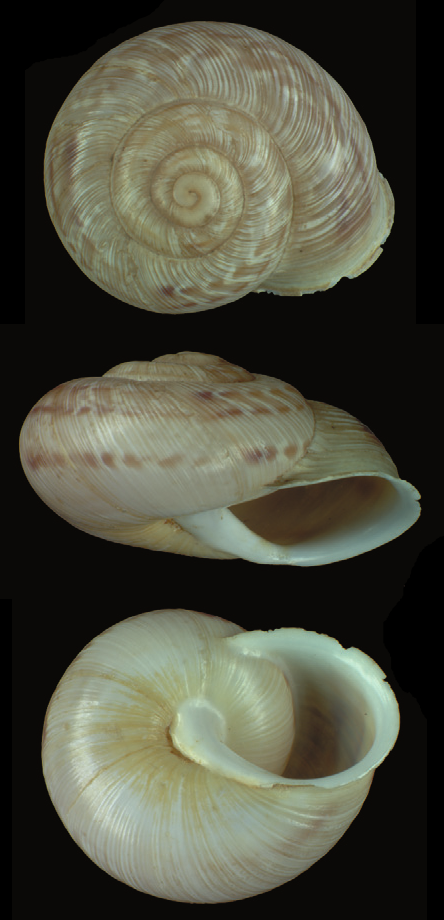
- Three views of a shell of Assyriella guttata, width 32.3 mm

Scientific classification
- Domain: Eukaryota
- Kingdom: Animalia
- Phylum: Mollusca
- Class: Gastropoda
- Order: Stylommatophora
- Family: Helicidae
- Genus: Levantina
- Species: L. guttata

Binomial name
- Levantina guttata (Olivier, 1804)

Synonyms
- Assyriella guttata (Olivier, 1804)

= Levantina guttata =

Species of gastropod

Levantina guttata is a species of air-breathing land snail, a terrestrial pulmonate gastropod mollusk in the family Helicidae, the typical snails.

== Distribution ==
This species occurs in Turkey.
