= Levantina longinqua =

Scientific classification
- Kingdom: Animalia
- Phylum: Mollusca
- Class: Gastropoda
- Order: Stylommatophora
- Family: Helicidae
- Genus: Levantina
- Species: L. longinqua

Binomial name
- Levantina longinqua (Schütt & Subai, 1996)

Species of land snail

Levantina longinqua is a poorly known species of air-breathing land snail, a terrestrial pulmonate gastropod mollusk in the family Helicidae, the typical snails.

The species is only known from its type series of uncertain provenance.

== Description ==
A large Levantina species (height 19–22 mm, diameter 40–43 mm). Shell flattened and thick-walled. Colour greyish white, the five bands are fuzzy and light brown, interrupted by a white zig-zag radial pattern. Whorls are not keeled in juveniles. Last whorl abruptly descends towards aperture. Aperture a bit expanded compared to the last whorl, with a broad reflected rim. Umbilicus largely covered. Most similar to Levantina cilicica.

== Distribution ==
The distribution is unknown. The species was described based on material allegedly originating from Mount Hasrat-Sultan, southeast of Samarkand in Uzbekistan. However, there is no other record of Levantina that far east and the species was never found again. The material could have actually originated from the Taurus Mountains in Turkey.
