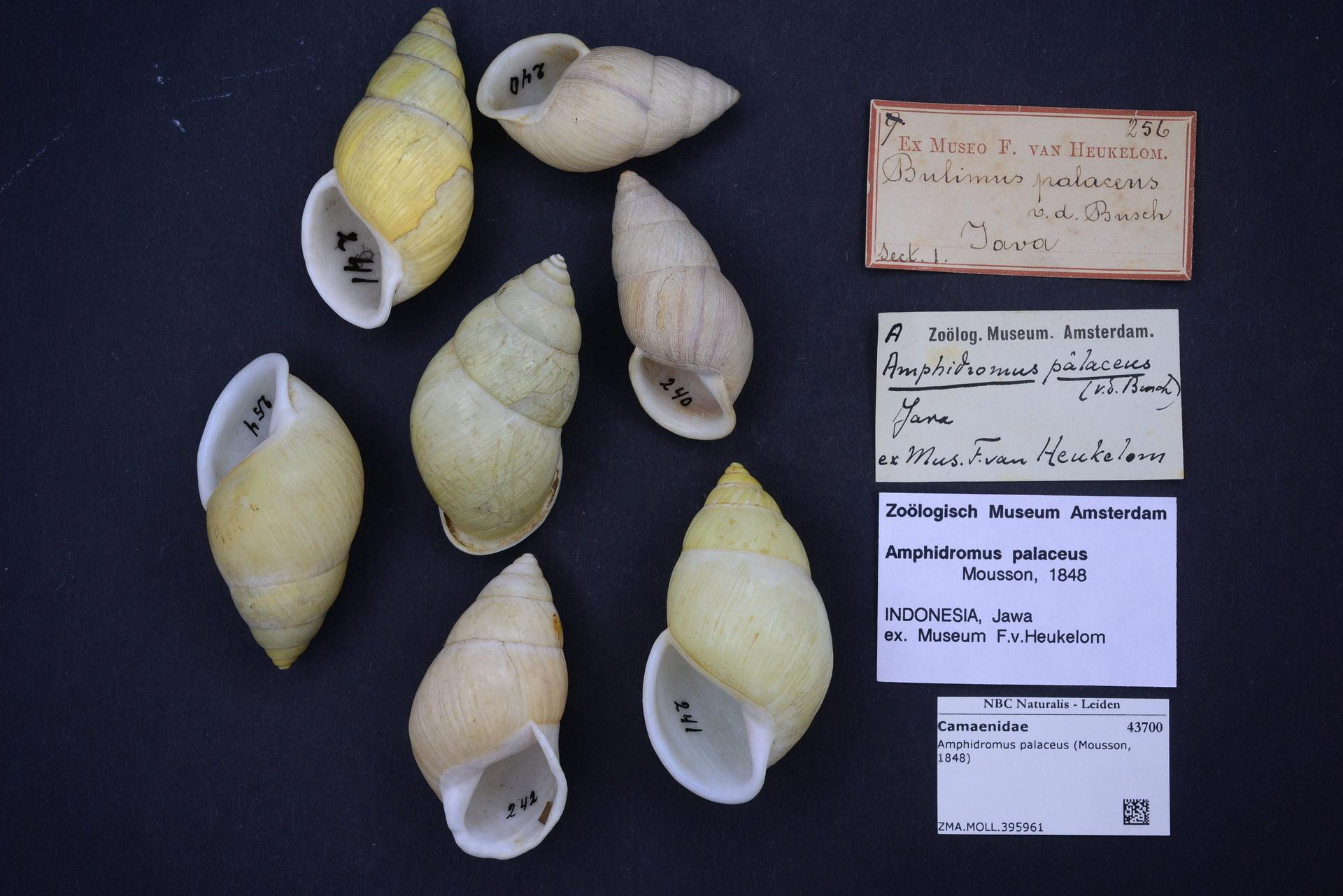
- Amphidromus palaceus shells

Scientific classification
- Kingdom: Animalia
- Phylum: Mollusca
- Class: Gastropoda
- Order: Stylommatophora
- Family: Camaenidae
- Genus: Amphidromus
- Species: A. palaceus

Binomial name
- Amphidromus palaceus (Mousson, 1848)

= Amphidromus palaceus =

Species of gastropod

Amphidromus palaceus is a species of air-breathing land snail, a terrestrial pulmonate gastropod mollusc in the family Camaenidae.
