= Orcula pseudodolium =

Conservation status
- Near Threatened (IUCN 3.1)

Scientific classification
- Kingdom: Animalia
- Phylum: Mollusca
- Class: Gastropoda
- Order: Stylommatophora
- Family: Orculidae
- Genus: Orcula
- Species: O. pseudodolium

Binomial name
- Orcula pseudodolium A. J. Wagner, 1912

Synonyms
- Orcula gularis A. J. Wagner, 1912

Species of gastropod

Orcula pseudodolium is a species of very small air-breathing land snail, a terrestrial pulmonate gastropod mollusk in the family Orculidae. This species is endemic to Austria.
