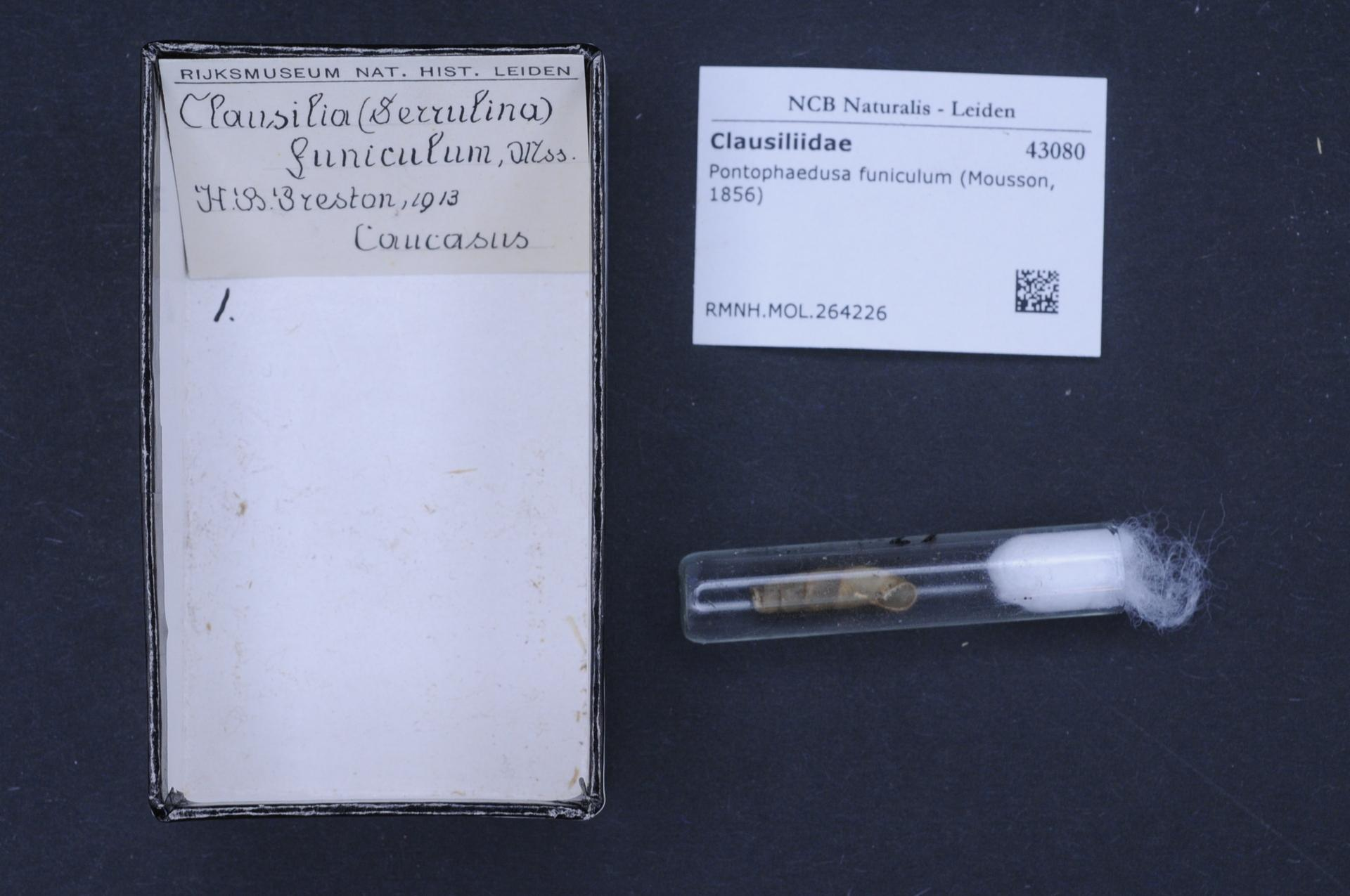

Scientific classification
- Kingdom: Animalia
- Phylum: Mollusca
- Class: Gastropoda
- Order: Stylommatophora
- Family: Clausiliidae
- Genus: Pontophaedusa
- Species: P. funiculum

Binomial name
- Pontophaedusa funiculum (Mousson, 1856)

Synonyms
- Clausilia funiculum Mousson, 1856

= Pontophaedusa funiculum =

Species of gastropod

Pontophaedusa funiculum is a species of land snail, a gastropod in the family Clausiliidae, the door snails within the subfamily Serrulininae. All door snails have a clausilium with which they can close the shell aperture.

This is the only known species within the Clausiliidae that lays eggs that have hard shells made of calcium carbonate.

It can live up to 15 years in captivity.

== Distribution ==
Pontophaedusa funiculum lives on the eastern coast of the Black Sea from Sochi in Russia, though Georgia, to Trabzon in Turkey.
