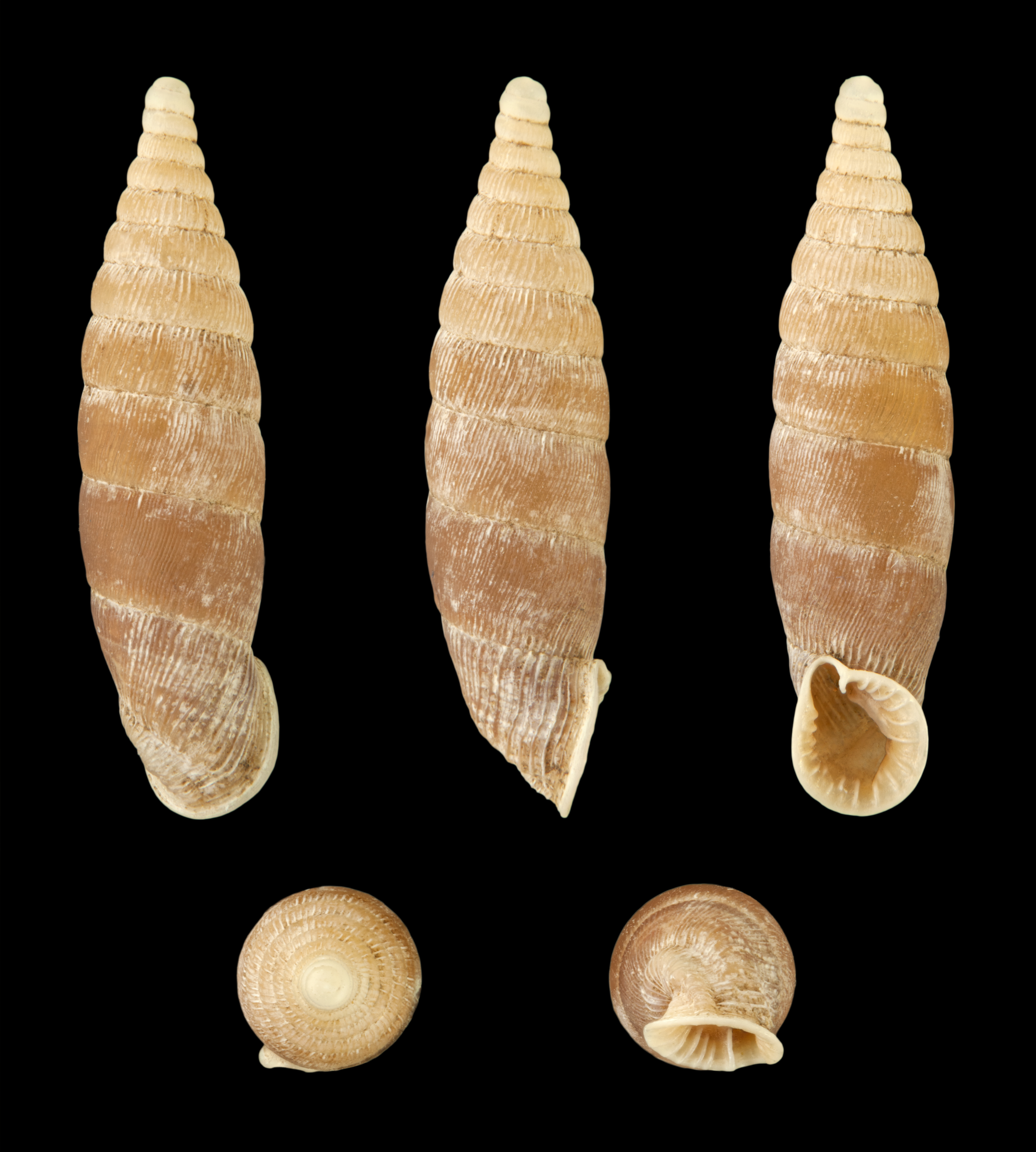
- A shell of Bulgarica denticulata. The height of the shell is 15 mm.

Scientific classification
- Domain: Eukaryota
- Kingdom: Animalia
- Phylum: Mollusca
- Class: Gastropoda
- Order: Stylommatophora
- Family: Clausiliidae
- Genus: Bulgarica
- Species: B. denticulata

Binomial name
- Bulgarica denticulata (Olivier, 1801)

= Bulgarica denticulata =

Species of gastropod

Bulgarica denticulata is a species of small air-breathing land snails, a terrestrial pulmonate gastropod mollusk in the family Clausiliidae, the door snails, all of which have a clausilium. This species lives in Turkey.
