= Levantina bellardi =

Scientific classification
- Kingdom: Animalia
- Phylum: Mollusca
- Class: Gastropoda
- Order: Stylommatophora
- Family: Helicidae
- Genus: Levantina
- Species: L. bellardi

Binomial name
- Levantina bellardi (Mousson, 1854)

Synonyms
- Assyriella bellardii (Mousson, 1854)

Species of mollusc

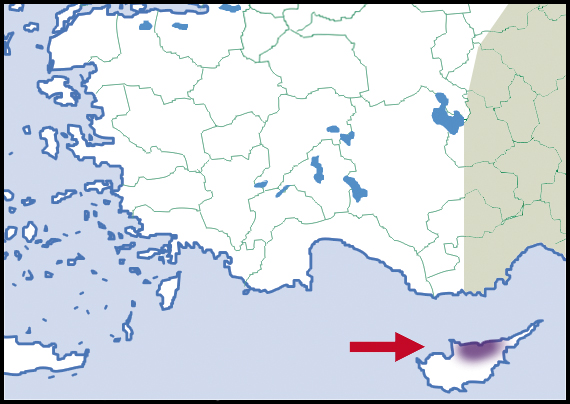
Native range of the species

Levantina bellardi is a species of gastropod belonging to the family Helicidae.

The species is found in Cyprus.
