= Graecoanatolica anatolica =

Conservation status
- Critically Endangered (IUCN 3.1)

Scientific classification
- Kingdom: Animalia
- Phylum: Mollusca
- Class: Gastropoda
- Subclass: Caenogastropoda
- Order: Littorinimorpha
- Family: Hydrobiidae
- Genus: Graecoanatolica
- Species: G. anatolica

Binomial name
- Graecoanatolica anatolica (Schütt, 1965)

Species of gastropod

Graecoanatolica anatolica is a species of freshwater snail, an aquatic gastropod mollusk in the family Hydrobiidae. The species is endemic to the Düden Waterfalls of Turkey.
