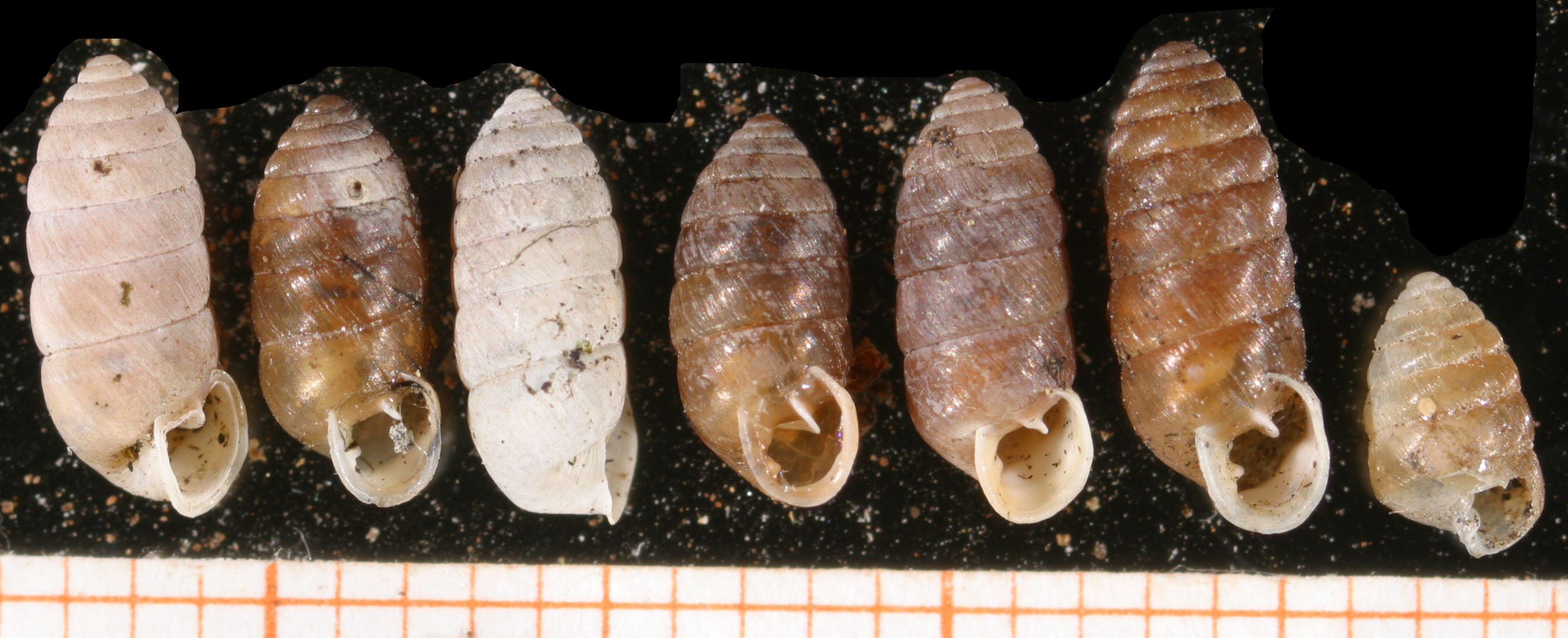

Conservation status
- Least Concern (IUCN 3.1)

Scientific classification
- Kingdom: Animalia
- Phylum: Mollusca
- Class: Gastropoda
- Order: Stylommatophora
- Family: Orculidae
- Genus: Orcula
- Species: O. austriaca

Binomial name
- Orcula austriaca Zimmermann, 1932

Synonyms
- Orcula spoliata S. Zimmermann, 1932; Orcula (Orcula) austriaca S. Zimmermann, 1932· accepted, alternate representation

= Orcula austriaca =

Species of gastropod

Orcula austriaca is a species of very small air-breathing land snail, a terrestrial pulmonate gastropod mollusk in the family Orculidae. This species is endemic to Austria.

Subspecies

- Orcula austriaca austriaca Zimmermann 1932
- Orcula austriaca faueri Klemm 1967
- Orcula austriaca goelleri Gittenberger 1978
- Orcula austriaca pseudofuchsi Klemm 1967
