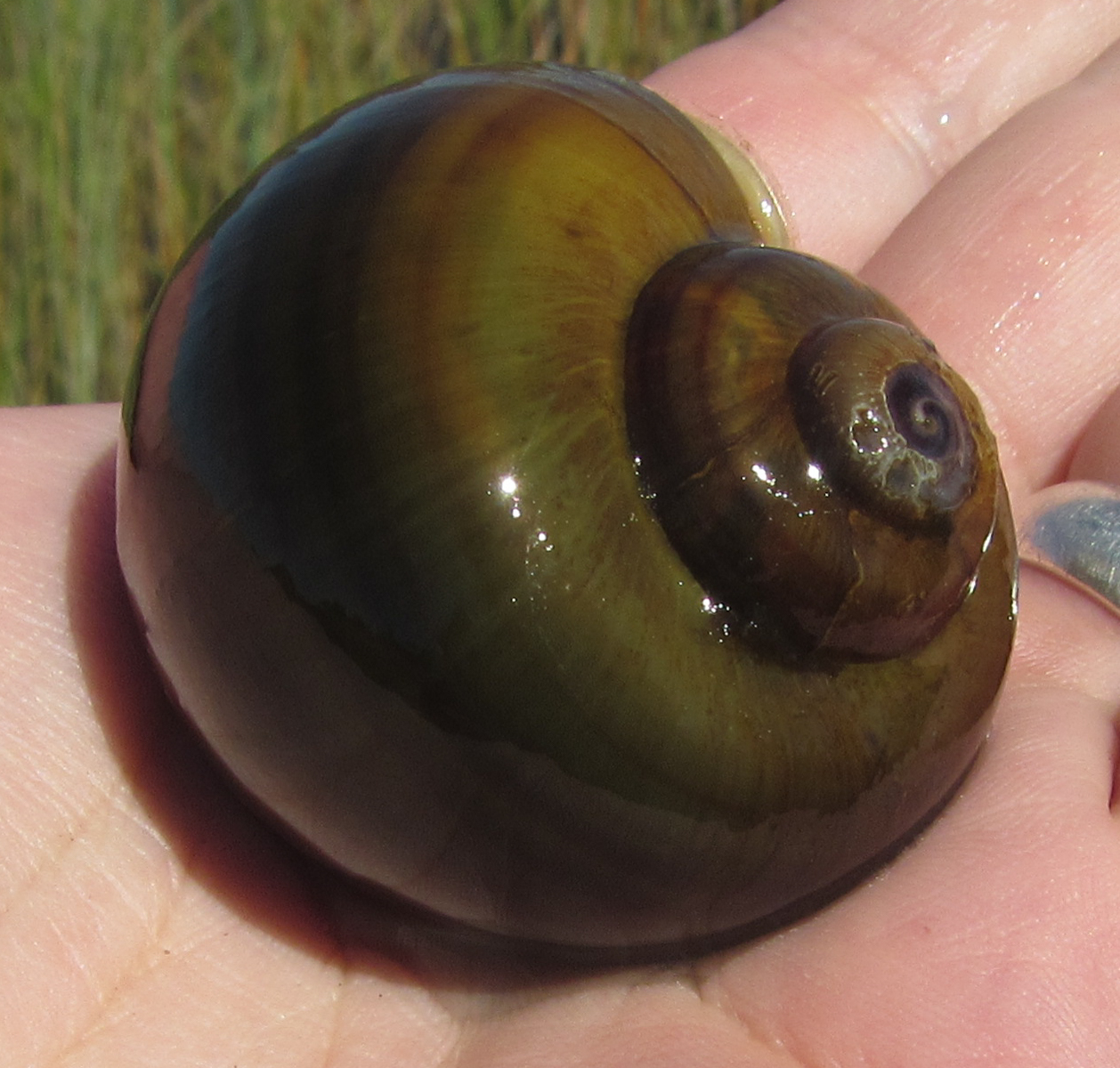

Conservation status
- Least Concern (IUCN 3.1)

Scientific classification
- Kingdom: Animalia
- Phylum: Mollusca
- Class: Gastropoda
- Subclass: Caenogastropoda
- Order: Architaenioglossa
- Family: Ampullariidae
- Genus: Pila
- Species: P. occidentalis

Binomial name
- Pila occidentalis (Mousson, 1887)

Synonyms
- Ampullaria occidentalis Mousson, 1887

= Pila occidentalis =

Species of gastropod

Pila occidentalis is a species of freshwater snail with an operculum, an aquatic gastropod mollusk in the apple snails family, Ampullariidae.

== Description ==
The length of the shell attains 47 millimetres (1.9 in), its diameter 48 millimetres (1.9 in).

(Original description in Latin) The shell is umbilicate, globose, and rather solid. It is irregularly striated but not decussate, appearing brownish-yellow, and is often obscurely marked with broad, frequently geminate (paired) spiral bands. The spire is briefly conical, with a corroded summit; the suture is somewhat impressed and linear.

The shell comprises 5 to 5.5 convex whorls. These are flattened at the suture. The body whorl is not ascending, but is rounded, shouldered above, and more convex towards the umbilicus. The aperture is oval and vertical (at 5° with the axis), nearly equalling four-fifths of the shell's height.It shows translucent bands internally. The peristome is acute and briefly everted; its margins are barely approximated and are joined by a thin lamina. The right margin is excised at nearly a right angle and well incurved, while the basal margin is minimally effuse, passing curvaceously into the gently reflected columellar margin. The operculum is rough and somewhat testaceous.

== Distribution ==
This species is found in Angola, Botswana, Namibia, and Zambia.
