= Euchondrus ramonensis =

Conservation status
- Critically Endangered (IUCN 2.3)

Scientific classification
- Kingdom: Animalia
- Phylum: Mollusca
- Class: Gastropoda
- Order: Stylommatophora
- Family: Enidae
- Genus: Euchondrus
- Species: E. ramonensis

Binomial name
- Euchondrus ramonensis (Granot, 1988)

Species of gastropod

Euchondrus ramonensis is a species of air-breathing land snail, a terrestrial pulmonate gastropod mollusk in the family Enidae.

The survival of this land snail species is critically endangered.

== Distribution ==
This species is endemic to Israel.
