= Graecoanatolica dinarica =

Conservation status
- Endangered (IUCN 3.1)

Scientific classification
- Kingdom: Animalia
- Phylum: Mollusca
- Class: Gastropoda
- Subclass: Caenogastropoda
- Order: Littorinimorpha
- Family: Hydrobiidae
- Genus: Graecoanatolica
- Species: G. dinarica

Binomial name
- Graecoanatolica dinarica (Kebpaçi, Koca & Yilidrim, 2012)

Species of gastropod

Graecoanatolica dinarica is a species of freshwater snail, an aquatic gastropod mollusc in the family Hydrobiidae. The species is endemic to Turkey, and is an endangered species due to pollution and habitat loss.
