= Orcula fuchsi =

Conservation status
- Critically Endangered (IUCN 3.1)

Scientific classification
- Kingdom: Animalia
- Phylum: Mollusca
- Class: Gastropoda
- Order: Stylommatophora
- Family: Orculidae
- Genus: Orcula
- Species: O. fuchsi

Binomial name
- Orcula fuchsi Zimmermann, 1931

Species of gastropod

Orcula fuchsi is a species of land snail in the family Orculidae. It is endemic to Austria, where it occurs on the eastern edge of the Alps.

This snail occurs in subalpine climates along mountain cliffs and ledges. It has a small range measuring about 35 square kilometers, but the species is found on only about half a square kilometer of territory within that range. It has been recorded at six locations, all within fragmented habitat, and the population is thought to be in decline. It is threatened by habitat destruction as spruce trees are planted in the natural habitat.
