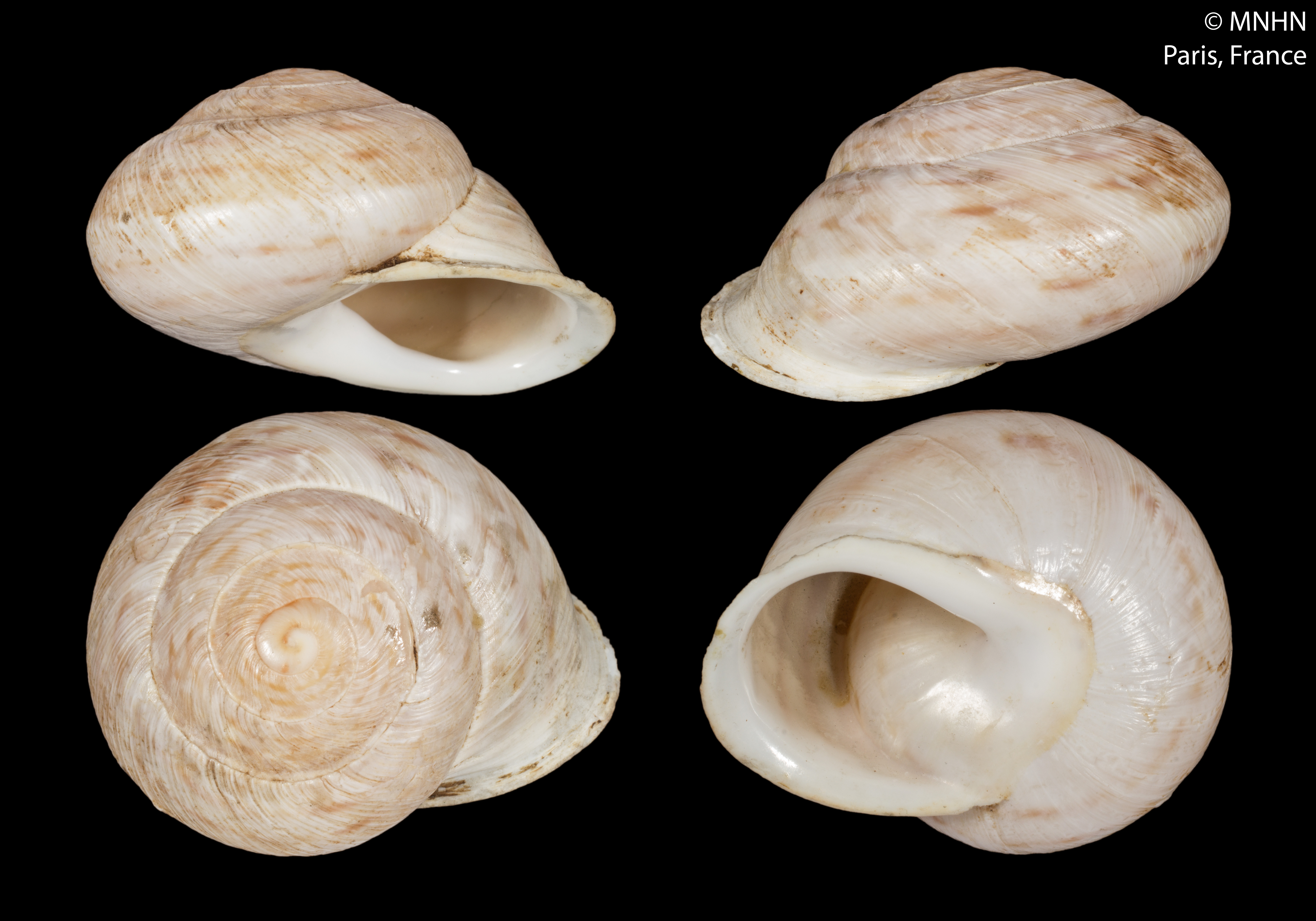
- Shell of Levantina spiriplana (syntype at MNHN, Paris)

Scientific classification
- Kingdom: Animalia
- Phylum: Mollusca
- Class: Gastropoda
- Order: Stylommatophora
- Family: Helicidae
- Subfamily: Helicinae
- Tribe: Helicini
- Genus: Levantina; Kobelt, 1871

Type species
- Helix spiriplana Olivier, 1801

Synonyms
- Assyriella P. Hesse, 1909; Levantina (Laevihelix) Neubert, 1998

= Levantina =

Genus of gastropods

Levantina is a genus of air-breathing land snails, terrestrial pulmonate gastropod mollusks in the subfamily Helicinae of the family Helicidae, the typical snails.

== Description ==
Large rock-dwelling land snails with flatted or less often broadly conical shells, some species or populations with an umbilicus. The shell is keeled in some species, at least in juveniles.

== Distribution ==
The natural distribution range of Levantina stretches from the central Taurus Mountains in southern Turkey southwards to Israel and Jordan and eastwards to the Alborz Mountains in northern Iran and the Kermanshah Province in western Iran. One species lives on Cyprus, and four have been described from the mountains in the west of Arabian Peninsula.

The L. spiriplana complex has been introduced to Cyprus and the eastern Aegean.

== Species ==
The species-level taxonomy of Levantina is unsettled, because molecular phylogeny based on mitochondrial genes found many of the species recognized by morphological revisions to be very closely related. The real number of species may thus be lower than currently assumed.

Levantina longinqua is an enigmatic taxon where only the original series is known. It was allegedly collected south-east of Samarqand, Uzbekistan. That would be the eastern-most natural occurrence of any helicid, but a confirmation is needed.

Levantina semitecta from the northwest of Saudi Arabia is known only from shells.

For several species (L. longinqua, L. mahanica, L. ninivita, L. semitecta), there are no sequence data whatsoever (as of 2023).

- Levantina asagittata Neubert, 1998
- Levantina asira Neubert, 1998
- Levantina bellardi (Mousson, 1854)
- Levantina caesareana (Mousson, 1854)
- Levantina ceratomma (L. Pfeiffer, 1855)
- Levantina djulfensis (Dubois de Montpéreux, 1840)
- Levantina escheriana (Bourguignat, 1864)
- Levantina guttata (Olivier, 1804)
- Levantina kurdistana (L. Pfeiffer, 1861)
- Levantina longinqua (Schütt & Subai, 1996)
- Levantina mahanica Kobelt, 1910
- Levantina mardinensis Kobelt, 1900
- Levantina naegelei Kobelt, 1901
- Levantina ninivita (Galland, 1885)
- Levantina semitecta Neubert, 1998
- Levantina spiriplana (Olivier, 1801)
- Levantina symensi Neubert, 1998
- Levantina thospitis (Schütt & Subai, 1996)
- Levantina vanensis (Schütt & Subai, 1996)
