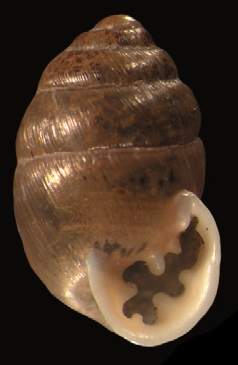
- A shell of Multidentula ovularis. Height of the shell is 5.1 mm.

Scientific classification
- Kingdom: Animalia
- Phylum: Mollusca
- Class: Gastropoda
- Order: Stylommatophora
- Family: Enidae
- Subfamily: Eninae
- Genus: Multidentula; Lindholm, 1925

Synonyms
- Bollingeria Forcart, 1940; Chondrula (Multidentula) Lindholm, 1925 (original rank); Improvisa Schileyko, 1978; Senaridenta Schileyko, 1978; Tokatia Hudec, 1972

= Multidentula =

Genus of gastropods

Multidentula is a genus of minute air-breathing land snail, a terrestrial pulmonate gastropod mollusk in the family Enidae.

== Species ==
Species within the genus Multidentula include:

- Multidentula lamellifera (Rossmässler, 1858)
- Multidentula nachicevanjensis (Hudec, 1972)
- Multidentula ovularis (Olivier, 1801)
- Multidentula pupoides (Krynicki, 1833)
- Multidentula reducta Bank, Menkhorst & Neubert, 2016
- Multidentula ridens (Nägele, 1906)
- Multidentula squalina (L. Pfeiffer, 1848)
- Multidentula stylus (L. Pfeiffer, 1848)
