= Levantina semitecta =

Scientific classification
- Kingdom: Animalia
- Phylum: Mollusca
- Class: Gastropoda
- Order: Stylommatophora
- Family: Helicidae
- Genus: Levantina
- Species: L. semitecta

Binomial name
- Levantina semitecta Neubert, 1998

Synonyms
- Levantina (Laevihelix) semitecta Neubert, 1998 (original name)

Species of land snail

Levantina semitecta is a poorly known species of air-breathing land snail, a terrestrial pulmonate gastropod mollusk in the family Helicidae, the typical snails.

Described on the basis of two empty shells of imprecisely known geographic origin. No record of live individuals has ever been published and no genetic data is available for the species.

== Description ==
A small Levantina species (holotype: height 10 mm, diameter 18 mm). Shell flattened, with a relatively large protoconch. Colour greyish white with a white zig-zag radial pattern. Whorls are not keeled in juveniles. Last whorl abruptly descends towards aperture. Aperture almost circular, with a reflected rim. Narrow umbilicus half covered.

== Distribution ==
Occurs in northwestern Saudi Arabia. The type locality is stated as "Midian". Therefore, it presumably lives in northern Hijaz, in an area that stretches from the south of Jabal al-Lawz to Al Wajh at the Red Sea shore and includes Jabal al-Dubbagh.
