= Radoman =

Radoman is a Serbian given name and a surname. Notable people with the name include:

== Given name ==
- Radoman Božović (born 1953), Serbian politician and prime minister of Serbia (1991–1993)
- Radoman Kanjevac (born 1960), Serbian poet

== Surname ==
- Igor Vladimirovich Radoman (1921–1992), Soviet artist, painter and author
- Miroslav Radoman (born 1958), Serbian footballer referee
- Pavle Radoman (1913–2007), Serbian doctor of biological sciences and professor at the University of Belgrade
- Vladan Radoman (1936–2015), Serbian medical writer
