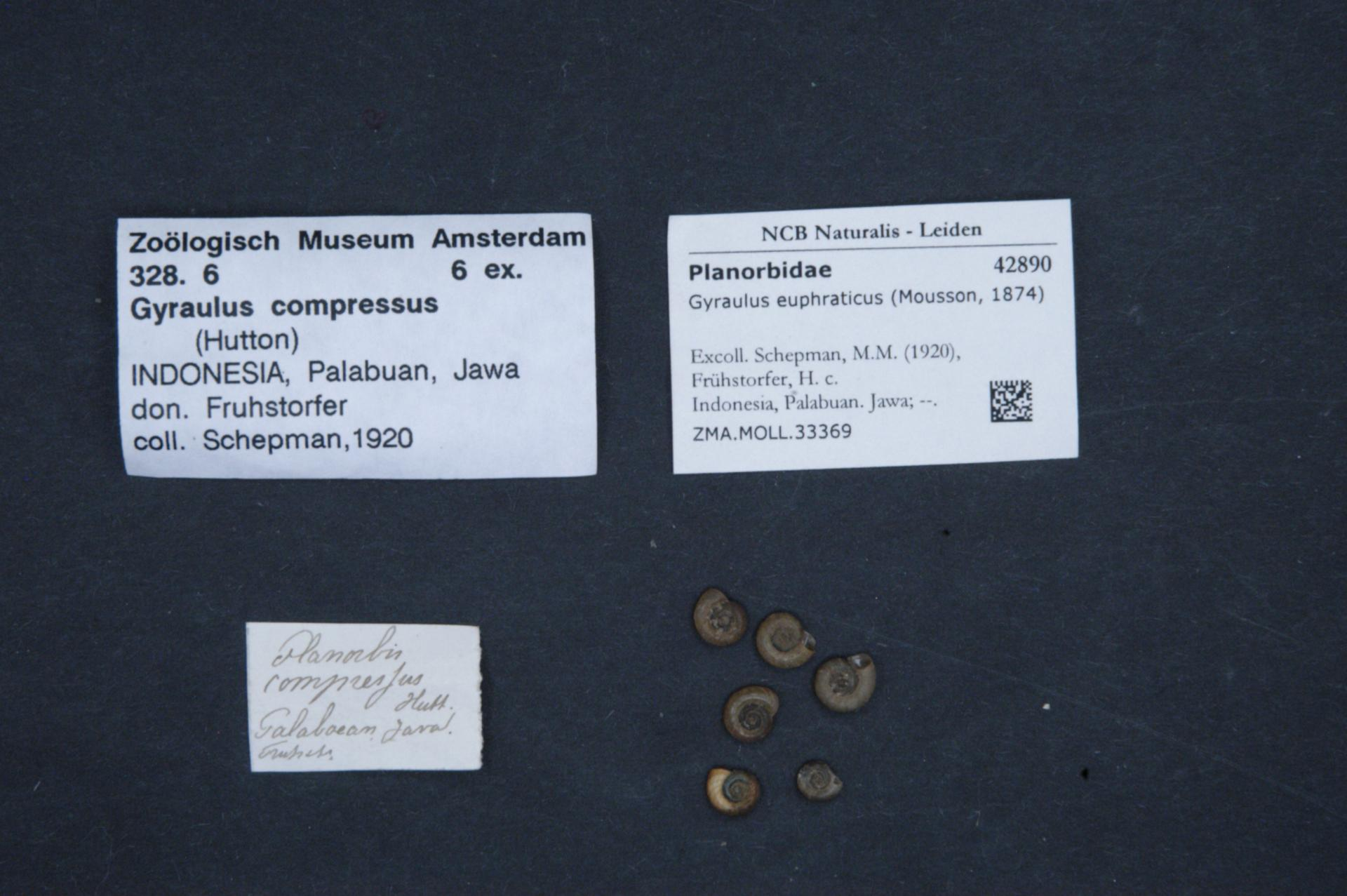

Scientific classification
- Kingdom: Animalia
- Phylum: Mollusca
- Class: Gastropoda
- Superorder: Hygrophila
- Family: Planorbidae
- Genus: Gyraulus
- Species: G. euphraticus

Binomial name
- Gyraulus euphraticus (Mousson, 1874)

= Gyraulus euphraticus =

Species of gastropod

Gyraulus euphraticus is a species of gastropods belonging to the family Planorbidae.

The species is found in India.
