= Orcula zilchi =

Conservation status
- Vulnerable (IUCN 3.1)

Scientific classification
- Kingdom: Animalia
- Phylum: Mollusca
- Class: Gastropoda
- Order: Stylommatophora
- Family: Orculidae
- Genus: Orcula
- Species: O. zilchi

Binomial name
- Orcula zilchi Urbański, 1960

Species of gastropod

Orcula zilchi is a species of small air-breathing land snail, a terrestrial pulmonate gastropod mollusk in the family Orculidae. This species is known from the type locality in Bulgaria and three localities in Turkey.
