= Biogeography of gastropods =

The biogeography of gastropods is the study of the distribution of the biodiversity of gastropods over space and time.

== Prehistoric ==
The study of the biogeography of gastropods is within the scope of paleobiogeography.

== Marine ==
The world's highest biodiversity of Volutomitridae is in waters of New Caledonia.

== Non-marine ==
The biogeography of non-marine gastropods (freshwater snails, land snails and slugs) is often studied along with that of freshwater bivalves.
