= Graecoanatolica kocapinarica =

Conservation status
- Vulnerable (IUCN 3.1)

Scientific classification
- Kingdom: Animalia
- Phylum: Mollusca
- Class: Gastropoda
- Subclass: Caenogastropoda
- Order: Littorinimorpha
- Family: Hydrobiidae
- Genus: Graecoanatolica
- Species: G. kocapinarica

Binomial name
- Graecoanatolica kocapinarica (Radoman, 1973)

Species of gastropod

Graecoanatolica kocapinarica is a species of freshwater snail, an aquatic gastropod mollusk in the family Hydrobiidae. The species is endemic to a spring outside Aşağı Gökdere Village in Turkey.
