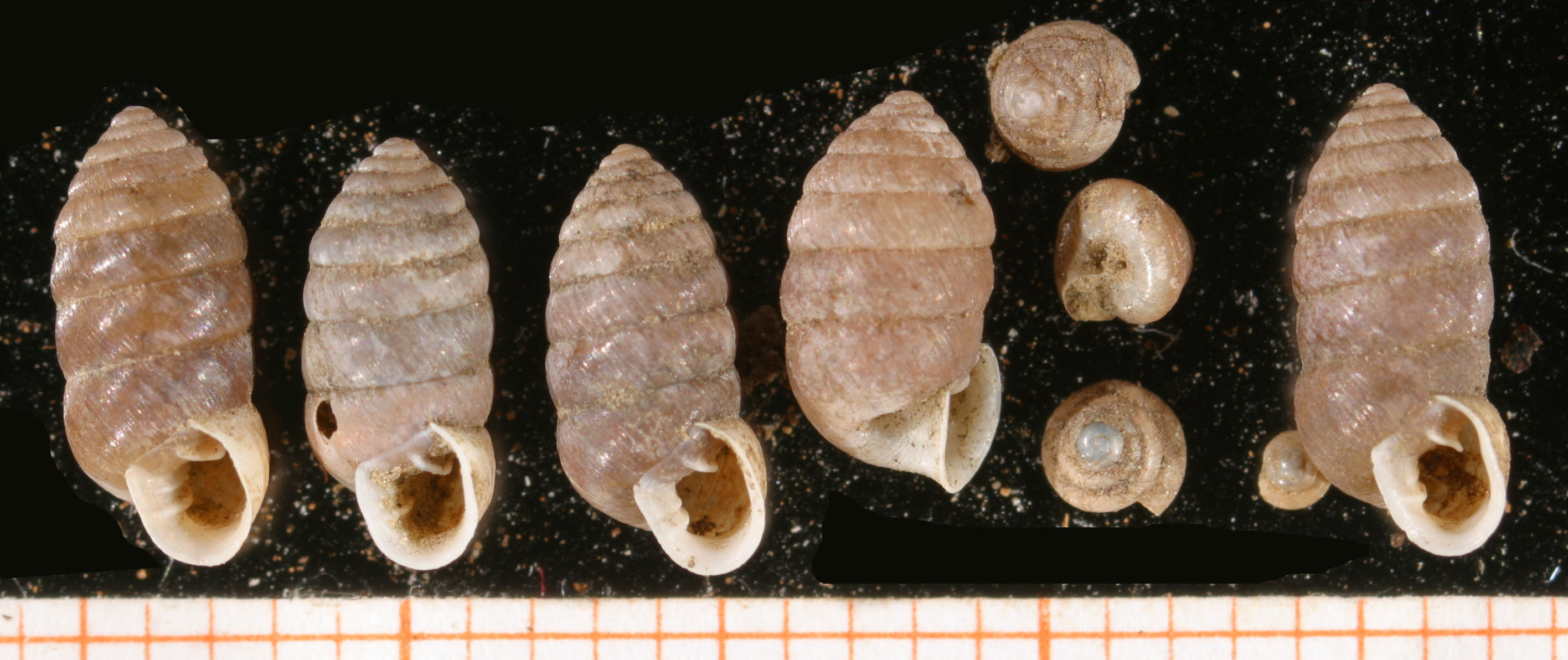
- Adult and juvenile shells of Orcula dolium

Scientific classification
- Domain: Eukaryota
- Kingdom: Animalia
- Phylum: Mollusca
- Class: Gastropoda
- Order: Stylommatophora
- Infraorder: Pupilloidei
- Superfamily: Pupilloidea
- Family: Orculidae
- Genus: Orcula; Held, 1837

Type species
- Pupa dolium Draparnaud, 1801

Synonyms
- Orcula (Hausdorfia) Páll-Gergely & Irikov, 2013· accepted, alternate representation; Orcula (Illyriobanatica) Páll-Gergely & Deli, 2013· accepted, alternate representation; Orcula (Orcula) Held, 1838· accepted, alternate representation; Pupa (Orcula) Held, 1838; Pupula Mörch, 1852

= Orcula =

Genus of gastropods

Orcula is a genus of land snails in the family Orculidae. It is the type genus of the family.

These snails have ovate-cylindrical shells generally measuring about 5 to 10 millimeters.

The center of diversity of the genus is in the Alps. Some species live in alpine climates. In general, the snails occur in wet forested habitat and boulder fields on limestone substrates.

== Species ==
There are 14 species in this genus, divided among 3 subgenera.

Species include:

- † Orcula alvarium Schlickum, 1975
- Orcula austriaca Zimmermann 1932
- Orcula conica (Rossmässler 1837)
- Orcula dolium (Draparnaud 1801)
- Orcula fuchsi Zimmermann 1931
- Orcula gularis (Rossmässler 1837)
  - Orcula gularis gularis (Rossmässler 1837)
  - Orcula gularis oreina Ehrmann 1933
- Orcula imbricata (Jickeli, 1873)
- Orcula jetschini (Kimakowicz 1883)
- † Orcula oviformis (Michaud, 1838)
- Orcula pseudodolium A. J. Wagner 1912
- Orcula restituta (Westerlund 1887)
- Orcula schmidti (Küster 1843)
  - Orcula (Illyriobanatica) schmidtii schmidtii (Küster, 1843)
  - Orcula schmidti transversalis (Westerlund 1894)
- Orcula spoliata (Rossmässler 1837)
- Orcula tolminensis A. J. Wagner 1912
- Orcula tomlini Connolly, 1931
- Orcula wagneri Sturany 1914
  - Orcula wagneri wagneri Sturany 1914
  - Orcula wagneri ljubetenensis Sturany 1914
- Orcula zilchi Urbański, 1960

Species brought into synonymy

- Orcula bulgarica P. Hesse, 1915: synonym of Orculella bulgarica (P. Hesse, 1915) (original combination)
- Orcula corrugata Locard, 1894: synonym of Abida cylindrica (Michaud, 1829) (junior synonym)
- Orcula cylindriformis Locard, 1894: synonym of Abida cylindrica (Michaud, 1829) (junior synonym)
- Orcula dobrogica (Grossu 1986): synonym of Sphyradium doliolum (Bruguière, 1792) (junior synonym)
- Orcula doliolum (Bruguière, 1792): synonym of Sphyradium doliolum (Bruguière, 1792) (unaccepted combination)
- Orcula driana Kaltenbach, 1943: synonym of Orculella driana (Kaltenbach, 1943) (original combination)
- Orcula falkneri Hausdorf, 1995 †: synonym of Nordsieckula falkneri (Hausdorf, 1995) † (new combination)
- Orcula multidentata Kaltenbach, 1943: synonym of Orculella multidentata (Kaltenbach, 1943) (original combination)
- Orcula plateaui (Cossmann, 1889) †: synonym of Orcula oviformis (Michaud, 1838) † (junior synonym)
- Orcula pollonerae (Pini 1884): synonym of Orcula spoliata (Rossmässler 1837)
- Orcula scyphus (L. Pfeiffer, 1848): synonym of Schileykula scyphus (L. Pfeiffer, 1848) (unaccepted combination)
- Orcula striata Kaltenbach, 1943: synonym of Orculella striata (Kaltenbach, 1943) (original combination)
- Orcula subconica (F. Sandberger, 1858) †: synonym of Nordsieckula subconica (F. Sandberger, 1858) † (new combination)
- Orcula tingitana Pallary, 1918: synonym of Orculella tingitana (Pallary, 1918) (original combination)
- Orcula tomlini Connolly, 1931: synonym of Orculella tomlini (Connolly, 1931) (basionym)
- Orcula tripolitana Kaltenbach, 1943: synonym of Orculella templorum tripolitana (Kaltenbach, 1943) (basionym)
- Orcula turcica Letourneux, 1884: synonym of Orculella critica (L. Pfeiffer, 1856) (junior synonym)
