= Alvariella =

Scientific classification
- Kingdom: Animalia
- Phylum: Mollusca
- Class: Gastropoda
- Order: Stylommatophora
- Family: Orculidae
- Genus: Alvariella; Hausdorf, 1996
- Species: A. multiplicata

Binomial name
- Alvariella multiplicata Hausdorf, 1996

Genus of gastropods

Alvariella is a monotypic genus of air-breathing land snails, terrestrial gastropod mollusks in the family Orculidae. The sole species in the genus is Alvariella multiplicata Hausdorf 1996.
