= Otto Retowski =

Russian numismatist and malacologist

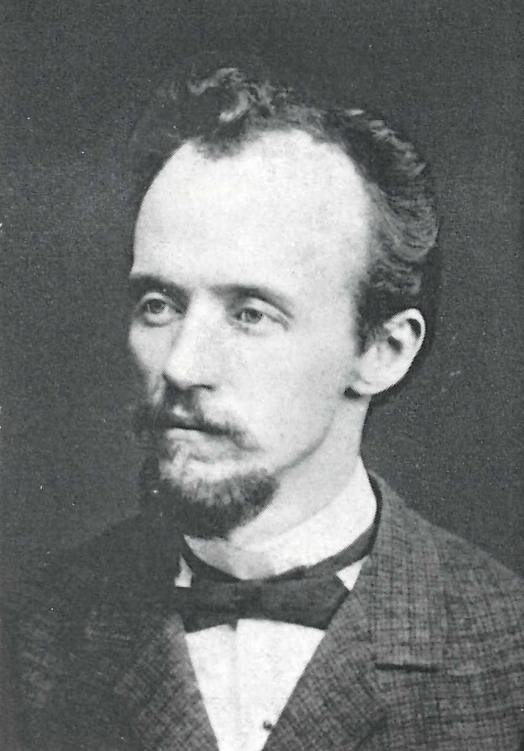

Otto Ferdinandovich Retowski (Russian: Отто Фердинандович Ретовский; 30 November 1849 – 29 December 1925) was a Prussian and later Russian malacologist, entomologist and numismatist.

== Life and work ==
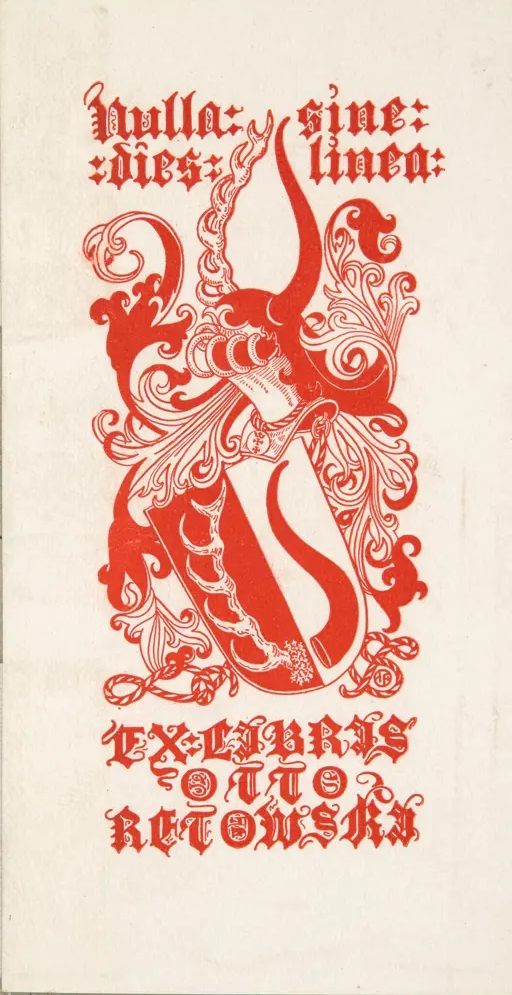
Ex Libris

Retowski was born in a noble family in Danzig and was given an early education at home. He then went to the Johannisschule at Danzig and went in 1868 to the University of Königsberg where he studied natural history. In 1874 he qualified as a school teacher and worked as a teacher of German. He served as a translator during the Franco-Prussian war. In 1872 he moved to Russia where he worked as a private tutor and in 1877 he received Russian citizenship and joined as a director at the museum in Theodosia in Crimea. He went on travels to collect specimens including to the Caucasus and Asia Minor. In 1884 he went to the Abkhazia and Kuban region on behalf of the Senckenberg Society for Natural Research. He donated his insect collection to the museum in Simferopol. He described a number of new species of beetles and orthoptera. In 1900, on the recommendation of the Grand Duke Alexander Mikhailovich, he moved to head the numismatics department of the Hermitage museum in St. Petersburg where he worked until 1924. He died a year later following an illness. The ammonite Retowskiceras is named in his honour.
