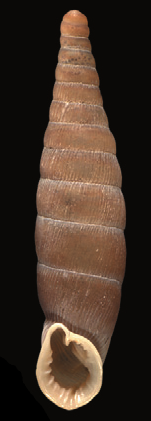
- A shell of Bulgarica denticulata

Scientific classification
- Domain: Eukaryota
- Kingdom: Animalia
- Phylum: Mollusca
- Class: Gastropoda
- Order: Stylommatophora
- Family: Clausiliidae
- Tribe: Baleini
- Genus: Bulgarica; Boettger, 1877

Synonyms
- Bulgarica (Denticularia) Lindholm, 1924; Laciniaria (Bulgarica) O. Boettger, 1877; Strigillaria (Denticularia) Lindholm, 1924

= Bulgarica =

Genus of gastropods

Bulgarica is a genus of air-breathing land snails, terrestrial pulmonate gastropod mollusks in the family Clausiliidae, the door snails.

== Species ==
The World Register of Marine Species lists the following species as accepted within Bulgarica:

- Bulgarica bulgariensis (L. Pfeiffer, 1848)
- Bulgarica denticulata (Olivier, 1801)
- Bulgarica fraudigera (Rossmässler, 1839)
- Bulgarica fritillaria (Frivaldsky, 1835)
- Bulgarica hemmenorum H. Nordsieck, 2015
- Bulgarica hiltrudae H. Nordsieck, 1974
- Bulgarica iniucunda (Brandt, 1962)
- Bulgarica osmanica (Westerlund, 1884)
- Bulgarica pagana (Rossmässler, 1842)
- Bulgarica pindica H. Nordsieck, 1974
- Bulgarica rugicollis (Rossmässler, 1836)
- Bulgarica thessalonica (Rossmässler, 1839)
- Bulgarica urbanskii H. Nordsieck, 1973
- Bulgarica varnensis (L. Pfeiffer, 1848)
