= Gottfried Nägele =

German Catholic priest and malacologist (1841–1914)

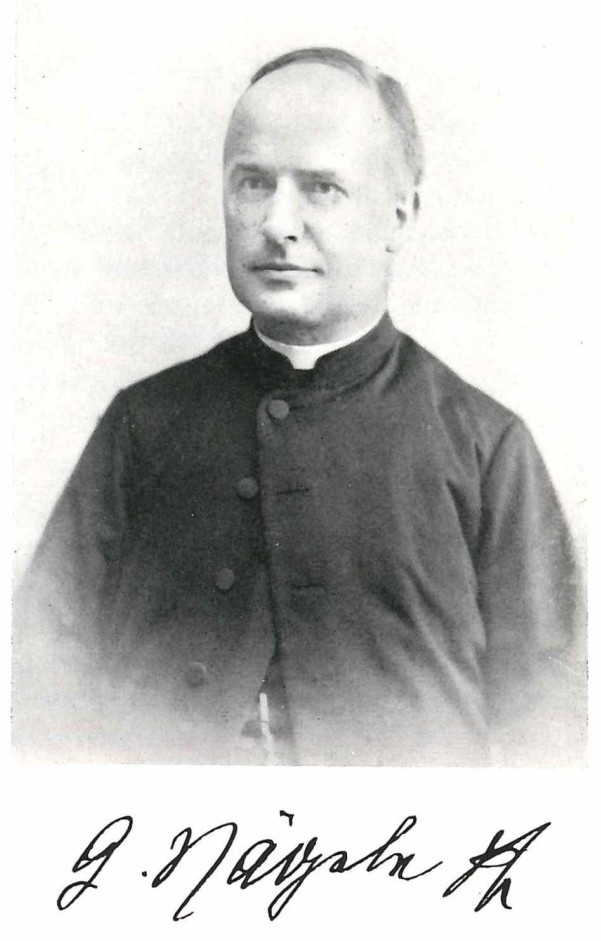

Gottfried Nägele (10 November 1841 – 27 January 1914) was a German Catholic priest, collector of shells, and a malacologist who described several new species. He came to be called the "snail priest" („Schneckenpfarrer“) because of his interests.

Nägele was born in the farming family of Johann (1795–1843) and Ottilia née Morath (1807–1884) at the Kohlhalder Hof, Ebnet (Bonndorf im Schwarzwald). He grew up with older sisters who take care of him after the death of his father in 1843. After schooling at Sommerau and Ebnet he went to high school in Donaueschingen in 1860 and then to Konstanz four years later. Evenings were spent grazing the family cattle and he once noted a rare species of orchid in the meadows. He became interested in the plants of the Black Forest region. After studying theology at Freiburg im Breisgau he was ordained priest in 1868. He worked at Griessen, Neustadt and Waldshut before finally becoming parish administrator at Waltersweier near Offenburg from 1873 and remaining there until his death. Nägele corresponded with Oskar Boettger and Wilhelm Kobelt at the Senckenberg Natural History Museum in Frankfurt on matters of molluscs. He sold duplicate shells to collectors and donated the money from it to his Catholic mission. He donated his collections of shells which included specimens from the orient collected by others to his colleague Justus Knecht who transferred it to the Ursulines of the Freiburg Catholic Institute. It was transferred to the Senckenberg Museum in 1941.
