= Albert Mousson =

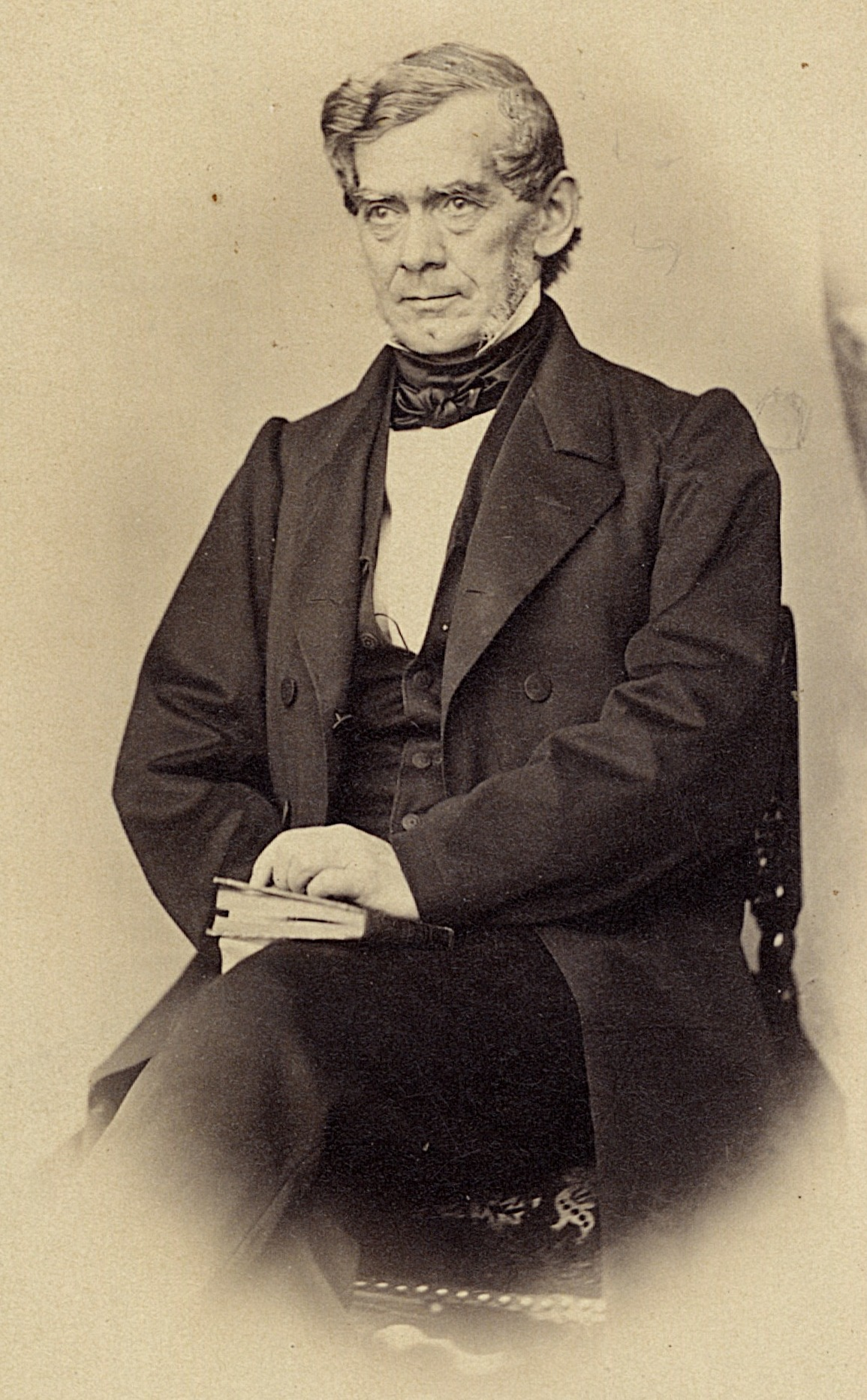
- Albert Mousson
- Born: March 17, 1805; Solothurn, Switzerland
- Died: November 16, 1890 (aged 85)
- Scientific career
- Fields: physics, malacology

Albert Mousson, full name Johann Rudolf Albert Mousson, (17 March 1805, Solothurn – 16 November 1890) was a physicist and a malacologist from Switzerland.

== Taxa described ==
=== Gastropods ===
Taxa described by Albert Mousson include (sorted chronologically):

1847

- Cochlostoma apricum (Mousson, 1847)

1848

- Amphidromus palaceus (Mousson, 1848)
- Amphidromus porcellanus (Mousson, 1848)

1849

- Asperitas rareguttata Mousson, 1849
- Melampus granifer (Mousson, 1849)
- Sulcospira infracostata (Mousson, 1849)
- Sulcospira sulcospira (Mousson, 1849)
- Tylomelania perfecta (Mousson, 1849)

1854

- Albinaria virgo (Mousson, 1854)
- Assyriella bellardii (Mousson, 1854)
- Caucasotachea nordmanni (Mousson, 1854)
- Chondrus limbodentatus var. abbreviatus Mousson, 1854 (no current allocation known)
- Chondrus truquii Mousson, 1854 (no current allocation known)
- Euchondrus limbodentatus (Mousson, 1854)
- Helix nucula Mousson, 1854
- Helix nicosiana var. pallida Mousson, 1854 (no current allocation known)
- Helix pomacella Mousson, 1854
- Levantina caesareana (Mousson, 1854)
- Melanopsis brevis Mousson, 1854 (no current allocation known)
- Metafruticicola nicosiana (Mousson, 1854)
- Neritina bellardii Mousson, 1854 (no current allocation known)
- Orculella sirianocoriensis (Mousson, 1854)
- Paludina badiella Mousson, 1854 (no current allocation known)
- Pupa lindermeyeri Mousson, 1854 (no current allocation known)
- Truncatella hammerschmidtiana Mousson, 1854 (no current allocation known)
- Helicigona hymetti (Mousson, 1854)
- Helix olivieri var. dilucida Mousson, 1854 (no current allocation known)
- Helix meridionalis Mousson, 1854 (no current allocation known)
- Asperitas sparsa Mousson, 1854
- Cernuella jonica (Mousson, 1854)

1856

- Clausilia firmata Mousson, 1856 (no current allocation known)
- Clausilia multilamellata Mousson, 1856 (no current allocation known)
- Clausilia unilamellata Mousson, 1856 (no current allocation known)
- Helix squamulosa Mousson, 1856 (no current allocation known)
- Pilorcula trifilaris (Mousson, 1856)
- Pontophaedusa funiculum (Mousson, 1856)
- Pupa schlaeflii Mousson, 1856 (no current allocation known)

1857

- Asperitas sparsa baliensis Mousson, 1857
- Asperitas waandersiana (Mousson, 1857) / Asperitas trochus waandersiana Mousson, 1857
- Dyakia clypeus (Mousson, 1857)
- Theba clausoinflata (Mousson, 1857)
- Theba geminata (Mousson, 1857)
- Theba impugnata (Mousson, 1857)

1858

- Balea nitida Mousson, 1858

1859

- Allaegopis transiens (Mousson, 1859)
- Bulimus subtilis var. corcyrensis Mousson, 1859 (no current allocation known)
- Bulimus tumidus Mousson, 1859
- Clausilia auriformis Mousson, 1859
- Helicigona subzonata (Mousson, 1859)
- Helix ambigua Mousson, 1859 (no current allocation known)
- Helix ambigua var. borealis Mousson, 1859 (no current allocation known)
- Helix corcyrensis var. cefalonica Mousson, 1859 (no current allocation known)
- Helix sericea var. epirotica Mousson, 1859 (no current allocation known)
- Helix corcyrensis var. octogyrata Mousson, 1859 (no current allocation known)
- Helix schlaeflii Mousson, 1859 (no current allocation known)
- Mastus grandis (Mousson, 1859)
- Monacha frequens (Mousson, 1859)
- Montenegrina janinensis Mousson, 1859
- Montenegrina rugilabris (Mousson, 1859)
- Napaeopsis cefalonica (Mousson, 1859)
- Isabellaria vallata (Mousson, 1859)
- Planorbis janinensis Mousson, 1859 (no current allocation known)
- Poiretia compressa (Mousson, 1859)
- Pupa philippii var. exigua Mousson, 1859 (no current allocation known)
- Pupa minutissima var. obscura Mousson, 1859 (no current allocation known)
- Viviparus janinensis (Mousson, 1859)
- Xeromunda vulgarissima (Mousson, 1859)

1861

- Euchondrus albulus (Mousson, 1861)
- Euchondrus chondriformis (Mousson, 1861)
- Helix texta Mousson, 1861
- Sphincterochila zonata filia (Mousson, 1861)

1863

- Monacha solidior (Mousson, 1863)
- Pseudamnicola sphaerion (Mousson, 1863)

1865

- Diastole schmeltziana (Mousson, 1865)
- Diastole schmeltziana usurpata (Mousson, 1869)
- Truncatella rustica Mousson, 1865

1869

- Melampus semisulcatus Mousson, 1869
- Pedinogyra minor (Mousson, 1869)
- Pythia savaiensis (Mousson, 1869)
- genus Trochonanina Mousson, 1869

1870

- Omphalotropis costulata (Mousson, 1870)

1872

- Acanthinula spinifera Mousson, 1872
- Hemicycla inutilis Mousson, 1872
- subgenus Nautilinus Mousson, 1872
- Theba grasseti (Mousson, 1872)
- Xerotricha adoptata (Mousson, 1872)
- Xerotricha nodosostriata (Mousson, 1872)

1873

- Omphalotropis albocarinata Mousson, 1873
- Plekocheilus ampullaroides (Mousson, 1873)
- Plekocheilus subglandiformis (Mousson, 1873)
- Rhodea gigantea Mousson, 1873
- genus Serrulina Mousson, 1873

1874

- Bithynia ejecta Mousson, 1874
- Euchondrus borealis (Mousson, 1874)
- Gyraulus euphraticus (Mousson, 1874)
- Monacha merssinae (Mousson, 1874)
- Neritina euphratica Mousson, 1874
- Neritina schlaeflii Mousson, 1874
- Orculella mesopotamica (Mousson, 1874)
- Planorbis intermixtus Mousson, 1874
- Pseudochondrula arctespira (Mousson, 1874)
- Radix hordeum (Mousson, 1874)
- Xeropicta mesopotamica (Mousson, 1874)

1876

- Ljudmilena tricollis (Mousson, 1876)

1887

- Pila occidentalis (Mousson, 1887)

year ?

- Pupilla signata (Mousson)

=== Bivalves ===
1854

- Cyrena crassula Mousson, 1854 (no current allocation known)

1874

- Cyrena tigridis Mousson, 1874
- Anodonta mesopotamica Mousson, 1874
- Anodonta schlaeflii Mousson, 1874
