= List of non-marine molluscs of Greece =

Location of Greece

The non-marine molluscs of Greece are a part of the molluscan fauna of Greece (wildlife of Greece).

A number of species of non-marine molluscs are found in the wild in Greece.

== Freshwater gastropods ==
Neritidae

- Theodoxus danubialis (Pfeiffer, 1828)
- Theodoxus varius callosus (Deshayes, 1832)

Viviparidae

- Viviparus contectus (Millet, 1913) - Lister's river snail
- Viviparus hellenicus (Clessin, 1879)

Bythinellidae

- Bythinella alexpeteri Glöer & Hirschfelder, 2020 - endemic to Greece
- Bythinella amira Glöer & Hirschfelder, 2020 - endemic to Greece
- Bythinella charpentieri (Roth, 1855) - endemic to Greece
- Bythinella corrosa Glöer & Hirschfelder, 2020 - endemic to Greece
- Bythinella dimitrosensis Glöer & Reuselaars, 2020 - endemic to Greece
- Bythinella eleousae Glöer & Hirschfelder, 2020 - endemic to Greece
- Bythinella ellinikae Glöer & Hirschfelder, 2020 - endemic to Greece
- Bythinella jozefgregoi Glöer & Reuselaars, 2020 - endemic to Greece
- Bythinella kambosensis Glöer & Hirschfelder, 2020 - endemic to Greece
- Bythinella kastaliae Glöer & Hirschfelder, 2020 - endemic to Greece
- Bythinella kastanolongosensis Glöer & Pešić, 2020 - endemic to Greece
- Bythinella kithiraensis Glöer & Hirschfelder, 2020 - endemic to Greece
- Bythinella klimaensis Glöer & Reuselaars, 2020 - endemic to Greece
- Bythinella konstadinensis Glöer & Reuselaars, 2020 - endemic to Greece
- Bythinella kwanti Glöer & Reuselaars, 2020 - endemic to Greece
- Bythinella kyriaki Glöer & Reuselaars, 2020 - endemic to Greece
- Bythinella liandinaensis Glöer & Reuselaars, 2020 - endemic to Greece
- Bythinella olymbosensis Glöer & Reuselaars, 2020 - endemic to Greece
- Bythinella perivoliensis Glöer & Reuselaars, 2020 - endemic to Greece
- Bythinella pesici Glöer & Reuselaars, 2020 - endemic to Greece
- Bythinella petrosensis Glöer & Reuselaars, 2020 - endemic to Greece
- Bythinella reghaensis Glöer & Reuselaars, 2020 - endemic to Greece
- Bythinella reischuetzi Glöer & Georgiev in Georgiev & Glöer, 2020 - endemic to Greece
- Bythinella reuselaarsi Glöer & Pešić, 2020 - endemic to Greece
- Bythinella taygetensis Glöer & Hirschfelder, 2020 - endemic to Greece
- Bythinella walensae Falniowski, Hofman & Rysiewska, 2016

Hydrobiidae

- Belgrandiella sperchios A. Reischütz & P. L. Reischütz, 2020 - endemic to Greece
- Daphniola dione Radea, Lampri, Bakolitsas & Parmakelis, 2021 - endemic to Greece
- Daphniola eptalophos Radea, 2011 - endemic to Greece
- Daphniola exigua (A. Schmidt, 1856) - endemic to Greece
  - Daphniola exigua pangaea (P.L. Reischütz, 1984) - endemic to Greece
- Daphniola hadei (Gittenberger, 1982) - endemic to Greece
- Daphniola longipenia Grego & Falniowski, 2021 - endemic to Greece
- Daphniola luisi Falnowski & Szarowska, 2000 - endemic to Greece
- Daphniola magdalenae Falniowski, 2015 - endemic to Greece
- Dianella thiesseana (Kobelt, 1878)
- Graecoanatolica macedonica Radoman & Stankovic, 1979 - extinct; it was endemic to Lake Dojran in North Macedonia and Greece.
- Grossuana angeltsekovi Glöer & Georgiev, 2009
- Grossuana avandasensis Glöer, Reuselaars & Papavasileiou, 2018 - endemic to Greece
- Grossuana beroni Georgiev & Glöer, 2020 - endemic to Greece
- Grossuana sidironerensis Glöer, Reuselaars & Papavasileiou, 2018 - endemic to Greece
- Grossuana stenaensis Glöer, Reuselaars & Papavasileiou, 2018 - endemic to Greece
- Grossuana thasia Georgiev & Glöer, 2020 - endemic to Greece
- Horatia podvisensis Glöer & Reuselaars, 2020 - endemic to Greece
- Isimerope semele Radea & Parmakelis, 2013 - endemic to Greece
- Islamia bendidis Reischütz, 1988 - endemic to Greece
- Islamia graeca Radoman, 1973 - endemic to Greece
- Islamia hadei (Gittenberger, 1982) - endemic to Greece
- Islamia papavasileioui Glöer & Reuselaars, 2020 - endemic to Greece
- Islamia skalaensis Glöer & Reuselaars, 2020 - endemic to Greece
- Islamia trichoniana Radoman, 1979 - endemic to Greece
- Myrtoessa hyas Radea in Radea, Parmakelis & Giokas, 2016
- Pontobelgrandiella lavrasi Boeters, P. L. Reischütz & A. Reischütz, 2017 - endemic to Greece
- Potamopyrgus antipodarum (J. E. Gray, 1843) - New Zealand mud snail
- Pseudamnicola brachia (Westerlund, 1886) - endemic to Greece
- Pseudamnicola chia (E. von Martens, 1889) - endemic to Greece
- Pseudamnicola exilis (Frauenfeld, 1863) - endemic to Greece
- Pseudamnicola ianthe Radea & Parmakelis in Radea, Parmakelis, Velentzas & Triantis, 2016
- Pseudamnicola ilione Radea & Parmakelis in Radea, Parmakelis, Velentzas & Triantis, 2016
- Pseudamnicola kavosensis Glöer & Zettler, 2021 - endemic to Corfu
- Pseudamnicola lesbosensis Glöer & Reuselaars, 2020 - endemic to Greece
- Pseudamnicola limnosensis Glöer, Stefano & Georgiev, 2018 - endemic to Greece
- Pseudamnicola macrostoma (Küster, 1853) - endemic to Greece
- Pseudamnicola magdalenae Falniowski, 2016
- Pseudamnicola mitataensis Glöer & Porfyris, 2020 - endemic to Greece
- Pseudamnicola pieperi Schütt, 1980 - endemic to Greece
- Pseudamnicola samoensis Glöer & Reuselaars, 2020 - endemic to Greece
- Pseudamnicola skalaensis Glöer & Reuselaars, 2020 - endemic to Greece
- Pseudamnicola stasimoensis Glöer & Reuselaars, 2020 - endemic to Greece
- Pseudoislamia stasimoensis Radoman, 1979 - endemic to Greece
- Radomaniola feheri Georgiev, 2013
- Trichonia trichonica (Radoman, 1973) - endemic to Greece

Moitessieriidae

- Iglica hellenica Falniowski & Sarbu, 2015
- Paladilhiopsis saeuerli A. Reischütz & P.L. Reischütz, 2020 - endemic to Greece

Bithyniidae

- Bithynia corfuensis Glöer & Zettler, 2021 - endemic to Corfu
- Pseudobithynia falniowskii Glöer & Pešić, 2006
- Pseudobithynia trichonis Glöer & al., 2007
- Pseudobithynia ambrakis Glöer, Falnoiwski & Pešić, 2010
- Pseudobithynia euboeensis Glöer, Falnoiwski & Pešić, 2010
- Pseudobithynia nigra Glöer & Zettler, 2021 - endemic to Corfu
- Pseudobithynia zogari Glöer, Falnoiwski & Pešić, 2010

Valvatidae

- Valvata cristata O. F. Müller, 1774
- Valvata klemmi Schütt, 1962
- Valvata macrostoma Mörch, 1864 - large-mouthed valve snail
- Valvata piscinalis (O. F. Müller, 1774) - European valve snail

Acroloxidae

- Acroloxus lacustris (Linnaeus, 1758) - lake limpet

Lymnaeidae

- Galba truncatula (O. F. Müller, 1774)
- Radix auricularia (Linnaeus, 1758) - big-ear radix
- Stagnicola corvus (Gmelin, 1791)
- Stagnicola fuscus (C. Pfeiffer, 1821)

Physidae

- Physella acuta (Draparnaud, 1805) - sewage snail

Planorbidae

- Gyraulus chinensis (Dunker, 1848)
- Pettancylus clessiniana (Jickeli, 1882)
- Planorbarius corneus grandis (Dunker, 1850)
- Planorbarius scoliostoma (Westerlund, 1898) - endemic to Greece
- Planorbis carinatus (O. F. Müller, 1774)
- Planorbis planorbis (Linnaeus, 1758)
- Segmentina nitida (O. F. Müller, 1774) - shining ram's-horn snail

- Lemna pereger

== Land gastropods ==
Truncatellidae

- Truncatella subcylindrica (Linnaeus, 1767)

Pomatiidae

- Pomatias elegans (O. F. Müller, 1774)

Aciculidae

- Acicula corcyrensis (O. Boettger, 1883) - endemic to Greece
- Acicula hausdorfi Boeters, Gittenberger & Subai, 1989 - endemic to Greece
- Acicula multilineata Boeters, Gittenberger & Subai, 1989 - endemic to Greece
- Platyla gracilis (Clessin, 1877)
- Platyla minutissima Boeters, Gittenberger & Subai, 1989 - endemic to Greece
- Platyla peloponnesica Boeters, Gittenberger & Subai, 1989 - endemic to Greece
- Platyla pinteri (Subai, 1976)
- Platyla similis (Reinhardt, 1880)

Azecidae

- Hypnophila zacynthia (Roth, 1855)

Cochlostomatidae

- Cochlostoma achaicum (O. Boettger, 1885) - endemic to Greece
- Cochlostoma cretense (Maltzan, 1887) - endemic to Greece
- Cochlostoma elegans imoschiense (A. J. Wagner, 1906)
- Cochlostoma euboicum (Westerlund, 1885) - endemic to Greece
- Cochlostoma gracile subaiorum Schütt, 1977 - subspecies endemic to Greece
- Cochlostoma hellenicum (Saint-Simon, 1869) - endemic to Greece
  - 2 subspecies: C. h. hellenicum and C. h. athenarum (Saint-Simon, 1869)
- Cochlostoma kleciaki (Braun, 1887)
- Cochlostoma pageti Klemm, 1962 - endemic to Greece
- Cochlostoma parnonis Schütt, 1981 - endemic to Greece
- Cochlostoma scalarinum (A. Villa & G. B. Villa, 1841)
- Cochlostoma tesselatum (Rossmässler, 1837)
  - 7 subspecies in Greece: C. t. tesselatum, C. t. densestriatum (P. Hesse, 1882), C. t. excisum (Mousson, 1859), C. t. griseum (Mousson, 1859), C. t. moussoni (O. Boettger, 1883), C. t. nordsiecki Schütt, 1977 and C. t. platanusae Klemm, 1962

Ferussaciidae

- Cecilioides acicula (O. F. Müller, 1774)

Lauriidae

- Lauria cylindracea (Da Costa, 1778)

Orculidae

- Orculella astirakiensis Gittenberger & Hausdorf, 2004 - endemic to Crete
- Orculella creantirudis Gittenberger & Hausdorf, 2004 - endemic to Crete
- Orculella creticostata Gittenberger & Hausdorf, 2004 - endemic to Crete
- Orculella cretilasithi Gittenberger & Hausdorf, 2004 - endemic to Crete
- Orculella cretimaxima Gittenberger & Hausdorf, 2004 - endemic to Crete
- Orculella cretiminuta Gittenberger & Hausdorf, 2004 - endemic to Crete
- Orculella cretioreina Gittenberger & Hausdorf, 2004 - endemic to Crete
- Orculella critica (Pfeiffer, 1856)
- Orculella diensis Gittenberger & Hausdorf, 2004 - endemic to Dia
- Orculella exaggerata (Fuchs & Käufel, 1936) - endemic to Greece
- Orculella fodela Gittenberger & Hausdorf, 2004 - endemic to Crete
- Orculella franciscoi Gittenberger & Hausdorf, 2004 - endemic to Dia
- Orculella ignorata Hausdorf, 1996
- Orculella scalaris Gittenberger & Hausdorf, 2004 - endemic to Dia

Chondrinidae

- Granopupa granum (Draparnaud, 1801)
- Rupestrella rhodia (Roth, 1839)

Enidae

- Ena monticola (Roth, 1856)
- Eubrephulus peloponnesicus (Gittenberger, 1984) - endemic to Greece
- Mastus etuberculatus (Frauenfeld, 1867)

Achatinidae

- Rumina decollata (Linné, 1758)
- Rumina saharica Pallary 1901

Truncatellinidae

- Truncatellina callicratis (Scacchi, 1833)

Vertiginidae

- Vertigo antivertigo (Draparnaud, 1801)

Clausiliidae

- Albinaria amalthea (Westerlund, 1878) - endemic to Crete
  - 3 subspecies: A. a. amalthea, A. a. bipalatalis (Martens & Boettger, 1878) and A. a. unipalatalis Nordsieck, 2017
- Albinaria ariadne Schilthuizen & Gittenberger, 1991 - endemic to Crete
- Albinaria arthuriana (Boettger, 1878) - endemic to Crete
  - 2 subspecies: A. a. arthuriana and A. a. xenogena Nordsieck 2017
- Albinaria brevicollis (Pfeiffer, 1850) - endemic to Greece
  - 6 subspecies: A. b. astropalia (Boettger, 1883), A. b. brevicollis, A. b. cristinae Liberto, Colomba & Sparacio, 2019, A. b. granoi Liberto, Colomba & Sparacio, 2019, A. b. maltezana Nordsieck, 2015 and A. b. sica Fuchs & Käufel, 1936
- Albinaria byzantina (Charpentier, 1852) - endemic to Crete
  - 2 subspecies: A. b. byzantina and A. b. glabella (Pfeiffer, 1864)
- Albinaria caerulea (Deshayes, 1835)
- Albinaria candida (Pfeiffer, 1850) - endemic to Crete
  - 3 subspecies: A. c. candida, A. c. homaloraphe (Pfeiffer, 1850) and A. c. monachorum Nordsieck, 2017
- Albinaria christae Wiese, 1989 - endemic to Crete
- Albinaria corrugata (Bruguière, 1792) - endemic to Crete
  - 6 subspecies: A. c. alada Schultes & Wiese, 1991, A. c. corrugata, A. c. gemina Nordsieck, 2017, A. c. inflata (Olivier, 1801), A. c. purpurea Reitsma, 1988 and A. c. turgida Wagner, 1924
- Albinaria cretensis (Rossmässler, 1836) - endemic to Crete
- Albinaria eburnea (Pfeiffer, 1854) - endemic to Crete
  - 4 subspecies: A. e. eburnea, A. e. inflaticollis Nordsieck, 2004, A. e. samariae Nordsieck, 2004 and A. e. sprattiana Nordsieck, 2017
- Albinaria fulvula Flach, 1988 - endemic to Crete
- Albinaria hians (Boettger, 1878) - endemic to Greece
  - 7 subspecies: A. h. achaica (Boettger, 1885), A. h. conemenosi (Boettger, 1883), A. h. cyclothyra (Boettger, 1878), A. h. hians, A. h. macrodera (Boettger, 1885), A. h. perlactea Nordsieck, 1974 and A. h. violascens (Westerlund, 1894)
- Albinaria hippolyti (Boettger, 1878) - endemic to Crete
  - 5 subspecies: A. h. aphrodite (Boettger, 1883), A. h. asterousea Schilthuizen, Welter-Schultes & Wiese, 1993, A. h. harmonia Schilthuizen, Welter-Schultes & Wiese, 1993, A. h. hippolyti and A. h. holtzi (Sturany, 1904)
- Albinaria idaea (Pfeiffer, 1850) - endemic to Crete and offshore islands
  - 7 subspecies: A. i. amabilis Engelhard & Slik, 1994, A. i. idaea, A. i. letoana Nordsieck, 2017 - endemic to the Paximadia islands, A. i. lindneri Nordsieck, 1998, A. i. pichcapunlla Schultes & Wiese, 1991 - endemic to the eastern Paximadia island, A. i. rolli Nordsieck, 1977 and A. i. venosa (Boettger, 1883)
- Albinaria jaeckeli Wiese, 1989 - endemic to Crete
- Albinaria janicollis Schultes & Wiese, 1991 - endemic to Gianysada
- Albinaria janisadana Loosjes, 1955 - endemic to the Dionysades islands
  - 2 subspecies: A. j. janisadana and A. j. paximadiana Loosjes, 1955
- Albinaria leonisorum (Boettger, 1901) - endemic to Crete
- Albinaria li Welter-Schultes, 1999 - endemic to Crete
- Albinaria loosjesi Nordsieck, 1977 - endemic to Crete and some small islets
  - 2 subspecies: A. l. loosjesi and A. l. sigridae Nordsieck, 2017
- Albinaria maltzani (Boettger, 1883) - endemic to Crete
  - 2 subspecies: A. m. ecristata Nordsieck, 2017 and A. m. maltzani
- Albinaria manselli (Boettger, 1883) - endemic to Crete
  - 2 subspecies: A. m. manselli and A. m. xerokampensis Wiese, 1990
- Albinaria moreletiana (Boettger, 1878) - endemic to Crete
- Albinaria parallelifera (Boettger, 1878) - endemic to Crete
  - 2 subspecies: A. p. clarissima Nordsieck, 1984 and A. p. parallelifera
- Albinaria praeclara (Pfeiffer, 1853) - endemic to Crete
  - 3 subspecies: A. p. drakakisi (Maltzan, 1884), A. p. praeclara and A. p. rudis (Pfeiffer, 1864)
- Albinaria pondika Welter-Schultes, 2010 - endemic to Pondikonisi Island off the Crete coast
- Albinaria rebeli Wagner, 1924 - endemic to Crete
- Albinaria retusa (Olivier, 1801) - endemic to Dia
  - 2 subspecies: A. r. marmorata Schultes, 1990 and A. r. retusa
- Albinaria rodakinensis Wiese, 1991 - endemic to Crete
- Albinaria scopulosa (Charpentier, 1852)
  - 6 subspecies: A. s. cristata Hausdorf, 1987 - endemic to Greece, A. s. epirotes Nordsieck, 1974, A. s. faueri Hausdorf, 1987 - endemic to Greece, A. s. glabricollis (Pfeiffer, 1866) - endemic to Greece, A. s. porrecta Hausdorf, 1987 - endemic to Greece, A. s. scopulosa - endemic to Greece
- Albinaria senilis corcyrensis (Mousson, 1859)
- Albinaria sphakiota (Maltzan, 1887) - endemic to Crete
- Albinaria spratti (Pfeiffer, 1846) - endemic to Crete
- Albinaria sturanyi Wagner, 1924 - endemic to Crete
- Albinaria sublamellosa (Boettger, 1883) - endemic to Crete
  - 4 subspecies: A. s. heteroptyx (Boettger, 1883), A. s. obliterata (Boettger, 1883), A. s. schultesi Wiese, 1988 and A. s. sublamellosa
- Albinaria tenuicostata (Pfeiffer, 1864) - endemic to Crete
  - 3 subspecies: A. t. omalica (Westerlund, 1892), A. t. tenuicostata and A. t. theresiae Nordsieck, 2017
- Albinaria terebra (Pfeiffer, 1853) - endemic to Crete
- Albinaria teres (Olivier, 1801) - endemic to Crete
  - 7 subspecies: A. t. andreae Nordsieck, 2017, A. t. distans (Pfeiffer, 1864), A. t. extensa (Pfeiffer, 1864), A. t. nordsiecki Zilch, 1977, A. t. teres, A. t. toplouensis Schultes & Wiese, 1991 and A. t. vermiculata (Boettger, 1883)
- Albinaria torticollis (Olivier, 1801) - endemic to Dia
- Albinaria troglodytes (Schmidt, 1868) - endemic to Crete
  - 6 subspecies: A. t. kitteli Nordsieck, 2017, A. t. niproensis Nordsieck, 2004, A. t. strictecostata (Boettger, 1878), A. t. subvirginea (Boettger, 1883), A. t. troglodytes and A. t. vexans (Boettger, 1883)
- Albinaria ulrikae Schilthuizen & Gittenberger, 1990 - endemic to Crete
- Albinaria violacea Schilthuizen & Gittenberger, 1990 - endemic to Crete
  - 2 subspecies: A. v. dextrogyra Schilthuizen & Gittenberger, 1990 and A. v. violacea
- Albinaria virginea (Pfeiffer, 1846) - endemic to Crete and offshore islands
  - 5 subspecies: A. v. gavdopoulensis Nordsieck, 2004 - endemic to Gavdopoula, A. v. gavdosensis Nordsieck, 2004 - endemic to Gavdos, A. v. litoralis Nordsieck, 2004, A. v. strigata (Pfeiffer, 1850) and A. v. virginea
- Albinaria wiesei Gittenberger, 1988 - endemic to Crete
- Albinaria xanthostoma (Boettger, 1883) - endemic to Crete
  - 2 subspecies: A. x. diktynna Nordsieck, 2017 and A. x. xanthostoma
- Carinigera schuetti Brandt, 1962
  - Carinigera schuetti limbrunneri Nordsieck, 1990
  - Carinigera schuetti serresensis (Nordsieck, 2015)
- Carinigera stussineri (O. Boettger, 1885)
  - Carinigera stussineri distantissima Nordsieck, 2021 - endemic to Greece
  - Carinigera stussinieri stussineri (O. Boettger, 1885)
- Charpentieria stigmatica sturmii (Pfeiffer, 1848)
- Graecophaedusa sperrlei Rähle, 1982 - endemic to Greece
- Idyla castalia yeruni Gittenberger, 2002
- Inchoatia haussknechti (O. Boettger, 1886) - endemic to Greece
  - 6 subspecies: I. h. alticola (Nordsieck, 1974), I. h. haussknechti, I. h. hiltrudae (Nordsieck, 1974), I. h. orina (Westerlund, 1894), I. h. refuga (Westerlund, 1894) and I. h. semilaevis (Boettger, 1889)
- Inchoatia inchoata (O. Boettger, 1889) - endemic to Greece
  - 4 subspecies: I. i. inchoata, I. i. klemmi (Nordsieck, 1972), I. i. paramythica (Nordsieck, 1974) and I. i. regina (Nordsieck, 1972)
- Inchoatia megdova (Nordsieck, 1974) - endemic to Greece
  - 4 subspecies: I. m. bruggeni E. Gittenberger & Uit de Weerd, 2009, I. m. megdova, I. m. palatalifera (Hausdorf, 1987) and I. m. tavropodensis (Fauer, 1993)
- Macedonica janinensis maasseni Gittenberger, 2002
- Macedonica pindica Gittenberger, 2002
  - 2 subspecies: M. p. bellula Gittenberger, 2002, M. p. pindica Gittenberger, 2002
- Montenegrina dofleini (Wagner, 1928)
  - 3 subspecies in Greece: M. d. kastoriae Nordsieck, 1972 - endemic to Greece, M. d. prespaensis Nordsieck, 1988 and M. d. sinosi Páll-Gergely, 2010
- Montenegrina fuchsi pallida Fauer, 1993 - endemic to Greece
- Montenegrina grammica grammica Nordsieck, 1988 - endemic to Greece
- Montenegrina hiltrudae Nordsieck, 1972
  - 7 subspecies in Greece: M. h. dennisi Gittenberger, 2002 - endemic to Greece, M. h. densicostulata Nordsieck, 1974 - endemic to Greece, M. h. hiltrudae - endemic to Greece, M. h. maasseni Gittenberger, 2002 - endemic to Greece, M. h. protruda Gittenberger, 2002 - endemic to Greece, M. h. robusta Nordsieck, 2009 - endemic to Greece and M. h. sattmanni Nordsieck, 1988
- Montenegrina janinensis (Mousson, 1859)
- Montenegrina laxa lakmosensis Nordsieck, 2009
- Montenegrina rugilabris (Mousson, 1859)
  - 5 endemic subspecies in Greece: M. r. edmundi Szekeres, 2006, M. r. gregoi Fehér & Szekeres, 2016, M. r. irmengardis Klemm, 1962, M. r. lambdaformis Reischütz & Sattmann, 1990 and M. r. rugilabris
- Montenegrina skipetarica (Soós, 1924)
  - 4 endemic subspecies in Greece: M. r. konitsae Nordsieck, 1972, M. r. pindica Nordsieck, 1988, M. r. thysi Loosjes & Loosjes-van Bemmel, 1988 and M. r. voidomatis Nordsieck, 1974
- Montenegrina zilchi Nordsieck, 1974
- Papillifera papillaris (O. F. Müller, 1774)
- Sciocochlea collasi Sturany, 1904 - endemic to Corfu
- Sciocochlea cryptica Subai & Szekeres, 1999
  - 3 subspecies endemic to Greece: S. c. acheron A. Reischütz & P.L. Reischütz, 2004, S. c. cryptica and S. c. filiates A. Reischütz & P.L. Reischütz, 2009
- Sciocochlea nordsiecki Subai, 1993
- Tsoukatosia arabatzis A. Reischütz & P.L. Reischütz, 2014 - endemic to Greece
- Tsoukatosia argolica A. Reischütz, P.L. Reischütz & Szekeres, 2016- endemic to Greece
- Tsoukatosia christinae A. Reischütz & P.L. Reischütz, 2003 - endemic to Greece
- Tsoukatosia evauemgei A. Reischütz, N. Reischütz & P.L. Reischütz- endemic to Greece
- Tsoukatosia lia Gittenberger, 2000 - endemic to Greece
- Tsoukatosia nicoleae A. Reischütz, P.L. Reischütz & Szekeres, 2016 - endemic to Greece
- Tsoukatosia pallgergelyi A. Reischütz, P.L. Reischütz & Szekeres, 2016 - endemic to Greece
- Tsoukatosia subaii Hunyadi & Szekeres, 2009 - endemic to Greece

Spiraxidae

- Poiretia compressa (Mousson, 1859)

Oxychilidae

- Eopolita protensa (Férussac, 1832)
- Libania rhodia Hausdorf & Kalaentzis, 2021 - endemic to Rhodos
- Mediterranea mariensis (E. Gittenberger, 2008) - endemic to Greece
- Oxychilus amaltheae Riedel & Subai, 1982 - endemic to Greece
- Oxychilus hydatinus (Rossmässler, 1838)

Pristilomatidae

- Hawaiia minuscula (Binney, 1841) - introduced
- Gyralina candida paupercula Riedel & Subai, 1993 - subspecies is endemic to Greece
- Gyralina ermonae Gittenberger, 1977 - endemic to Greece
- Gyralina epeirotica Riedel, 1983 - endemic to Greece
  - 2 subspecies: G. e. epeirotica and G. e. mylonasi Riedel & Subai, 1993
- Gyralina formosa Riedel & Subai, 1993 - endemic to Greece
- Gyralina hausdorfi Riedel, 1990 - extinct, it was endemic to Greece
- Gyralina pageti Gittenberger, 1988 - endemic to Greece
- Gyralina sattmanni Riedel, 1990 - endemic to Greece
- Gyralina tsatsae Gittenberger, 1977 - endemic to Greece
- Gyralina velasensis Riedel & Subai, 1991 - endemic to Greece
- Lindbergia parnonensis E. Gittenberger, 2008 - endemic to Greece
- Vitrea contracta (Westerlund, 1871)
- Vitrea megistislavras A. Reischütz & P.L. Reischütz, 2014 - endemic to Greece
- Vitrea subrimata (Reinhardt, 1871)

Zonitidae

- Balcanodiscus danyii Erőss, Fehér & Páll-Gergely, 2011 - endemic to Greece
- Balcanodiscus stummerorum A. Reischütz, P. L. Reischütz & W. Fischer, 2008 - endemic to Greece
- Zonites anaphiensis Riedel & Mylonas, 1981 - endemic to Greece
- Zonites embolium Fuchs & Käufel, 1936
  - Zonites embolium elevatus Riedel & Mylonas, 1997 - extinct, it was endemic to Greece
- Zonites santoriniensis Riedel & Norris, 1987 - extinct, it was endemic to Greece
- Zonites siphnicus Fuchs & Käufel, 1936 - extinct, it was endemic to Greece

Milacidae

- Tandonia aff. cretica

Limacidae

- Limax conemenosi O. Böttger, 1882

Agriolimacidae

- Deroceras astypalaeense Wiktor & Mylonas, 1992 - endemic to Greece
- Deroceras dewinteri Maassen, 2000
- Deroceras halieos de Winter & Butot, 1986 - endemic to Greece
- Deroceras ikaria P.L. Reischütz, 1983 - endemic to Icaria
- Deroceras johannae de Winter & Butot, 1985 - endemic to Andros
- Deroceras kasium Rähle, 1993 - endemic to Kasos
- Deroceras korthionense de Winter & Butot, 1985 - endemic to Andros
- Deroceras nyphoni de Winter & Butot, 1986 - endemic to Skiathos
- Deroceras oertzeni (Simroth, 1889)
- Deroceras pageti Grossu, 1972 - endemic to Greece (D. saronicum Rähle, 1986 is a synonym)
- Deroceras rethimnonense de Winter & Butot, 1986 - endemic to Crete
- Deroceras samium Rähle, 1986 - endemic to Samos

Vitrinidae

- Oligolimax annularis (Studer, 1820)

Hygromiidae

- Metafruticicola noverca (L. Pfeiffer, 1853)
- Metafruticicola pellita (Férussac, 1832)
- Monacha parumcincta (Rossmässler, 1837)
- Monacha rothii (L. Pfeiffer, 1841)

Geomitridae

- Cernuella ionica (Mousson, 1854)
- Trochoidea pyramidata (Draparnaud, 1805)
- Xerocrassa amphiconus (Maltzan, 1883) - endemic to Greece
- Xerocrassa claudia Hausdorf & Welter-Schultes, 1998 - endemic to Greece
- Xerocrassa claudiconus Hausdorf & Welter-Schultes, 1998 - endemic to Greece
- Xerocrassa cretica (Férussac, 1821)
- Xerocrassa diensis (Maltzan, 1883 - endemic to Greece)
- Xerocrassa franciscoi Hausdorf & Sauer, 2009 - endemic to Greece
- Xerocrassa grabusana Hausdorf & Sauer, 2009 - endemic to Greece
- Xerocrassa heraklea Hausdorf & Sauer, 2009 - endemic to Greece
- Xerocrassa kydonia Hausdorf & Sauer, 2009 - endemic to Greece
- Xerocrassa lasithiensis Hausdorf & Sauer, 2009 - endemic to Greece
- Xerocrassa mesostena (Westerlund, 1879) - endemic to Greece
- Xerocrassa poecilodoma (Boettger, 1894) - endemic to Greece
- Xerocrassa rhithymna Hausdorf & Sauer, 2009 - endemic to Greece
- Xerocrassa siderensis (Maltzan, 1883) - endemic to Greece
- Xerocrassa siphnica (Kobelt, 1883) - endemic to Greece
- Xerocrassa subvariegata (Maltzan, 1883) - endemic to Greece

Helicidae

- Aristena rechingeri Fuchs & Käufel, 1936 - endemic to Karpathos
- Cattania faueri (Subai, 1990) - endemic to Greece
- Cattania haberhaueri (Sturany, 1897)
- Cattania ista A. Reischütz, N. Steiner-Reischütz & P. L. Reischütz, 2016 - endemic to Greece
- Cattania trizona (Rossmässler, 1835)
- Codringtonia codringtonii (Gray, 1834) - endemic to Greece - Rock snail
- Codringtonia elisabethae Subai, 2005 - endemic to Greece
- Codringtonia eucineta (Bourguignat, 1857) - endemic to Greece
- Codringtonia gittenbergeri Subai, 2005 - endemic to Greece
- Codringtonia helenae Subai, 2005 - endemic to Greece
- Codringtonia intusplicata (Pfeiffer, 1851) - endemic to Greece
- Codringtonia parnassia (Roth, 1855) - endemic to Greece
- Cornu aspersum (O. F. Müller, 1774)
- Cornu cretensis Hausdorf, Bamberger & Walther, 2020 - endemic to Crete
- Eobania vermiculata (O. F. Müller, 1774)
- Helix asemnis Bourguignat, 1860
- Helix borealis Mousson, 1859
- Helix cincta O. F. Müller, 1758
- Helix fathallae Nägele, 1901
- Helix figulina Rossmässler, 1839
- Helix godetiana Kobelt, 1878 - endemic to Greece
- Helix lucorum Linnaeus, 1758
- Helix nucula Mousson, 1854
- Helix pelagonesica (Rolle, 1898) - endemic to Greece
- Helix philibinensis Rossmässler, 1839
- Helix pronuba Westerlund & Blanc, 1879
- Helix schlaeflii Mousson, 1859
- Helix thessalica Boettger, 1886
- Helix valentini Kobelt, 1891
- Josephinella argentellei (Kobelt, 1872) - endemic to Greece
- Josephinella brenskei (O. Boettger, 1883) - endemic to Greece
- Josephinella broemmei (Kobelt, 1892) - endemic to Greece
- Josephinella byshekensis (Knipper, 1941)
- Josephinella choristochila (O. Boettger, 1886) - endemic to Greece
- Josephinella comephora (Bourguignat, 1858) - endemic to Greece
- Josephinella conemenosi (O. Boettger, 1885) - endemic to Greece
- Josephinella eliaca (Kobelt, 1893) - endemic to Greece
- Josephinella hemonica (Thiesse, 1884) - endemic to Greece
- Josephinella kaeufeli (Knipper, 1939) - endemic to Greece
- Josephinella krueperi (O. Boettger, 1891) - endemic to Greece
- Josephinella phocaea (J. R. Roth, 1855) - endemic to Greece
- Josephinella sattmanni (Subai, 1995) - endemic to Greece
- Josephinella subzonata (Mousson, 1859)
- Josephinella vikosensis (Subai, 1990) - endemic to Greece
- Maltzanella godetiana (Kobelt, 1878) - endemic to Greece
- Neocrassa neocrassa Zilch, 1952
- Thiessea amorgia (Westerlund, 1889) - endemic to Greece
- Thiessea arcadica (L. Pfeiffer, 1853) - endemic to Greece
- Thiessea bacchica (E. von Martens, 1889) - endemic to Greece
- Thiessea cyclolabris (Deshayes, 1840) - endemic to Greece
- Thiessea euboeae (Frauenfeld, 1867) - endemic to Greece
- Thiessea fuchsiana (Knipper, 1939) - endemic to Greece
- Thiessea heldreichi (L. Pfeiffer, 1846) - endemic to Greece
- Thiessea hymetti (Mousson, 1854) - endemic to Greece
- Thiessea melpomene (Subai, 1996) - endemic to Greece
- Thiessea nympha (Subai, 1996) - endemic to Greece
- Thiessea pieperi (Subai, 1996) - endemic to Greece
- Thiessea polyhymnia (Subai, 1996) - endemic to Greece
- Thiessea posthuma (Knipper, 1939) - endemic to Greece
- Thiessea sphaeriostoma (Bourguignat, 1857) - endemic to Greece
- Thiessea valkanovi (Urbański, 1960) - endemic to Greece

Helicodontidae

- Lindholmiola barbata (Férussac, 1821) - endemic to Greece
- Lindholmiola corcyrensis (Rossmässler, 1838)
- Lindholmiola lens (Férussac, 1832)
- Lindholmiola regisborisi (A.J. Wagner, 1928)
- Lindholmiola reischuetzi Falkner, 1995 - endemic to Greece
- Lindholmiola spectabilis Urbanski, 1960 - endemic to Greece

Sphincterochilidae

- Sphincterochila insularis (Boettger, 1894)

== Bivalvia ==
Unionidae

- Unio crassus ionicus (Drouet, 1879)
- Unio mancus Lamarck, 1819
- Unio pictorum (Linnaeus, 1758)
- Anodonta cygnea (Linnaeus, 1758) - swan mussel
- Potomida acarnanica (Kobelt, 1879)

Dreissenidae

- Dreissena carinata Westerlund, 1890
- Dreissena polymorpha (Pallas, 1771) - zebra mussel

Sphaeriidae

- Odhneripisidium annandalei (Prashad, 1925)

== See also ==
- List of marine molluscs of Greece

Lists of molluscs of surrounding countries:

- List of non-marine molluscs of Albania
- List of non-marine molluscs of Bulgaria
- List of non-marine molluscs of North Macedonia
- List of non-marine molluscs of Turkey
