= Orculella diensis =

Conservation status
- Least Concern (IUCN 3.1)

Scientific classification
- Kingdom: Animalia
- Phylum: Mollusca
- Class: Gastropoda
- Order: Stylommatophora
- Family: Orculidae
- Genus: Orculella
- Species: O. diensis

Binomial name
- Orculella diensis Gittenberger & Hausdorf, 2004

Species of gastropod

Orculella diensis is a species of air-breathing land snail, a terrestrial pulmonate gastropod mollusc in the family Orculidae.

== Geographic distribution ==
O. diensis is endemic to Greece, where it is restricted to the eastern part of the island of Dia, north of Crete.

== See also ==
- List of non-marine molluscs of Greece
