= L. spectabilis =

L. spectabilis may refer to:

- Lacydes spectabilis, a moth species
- Lindholmiola spectabilis, a land snail species
- Liomys spectabilis, the Jaliscan spiny pocket mouse, a rodent species
- Lonchura spectabilis, the hooded mannikin, a bird species
- Lupinus spectabilis, a flowering plant species
