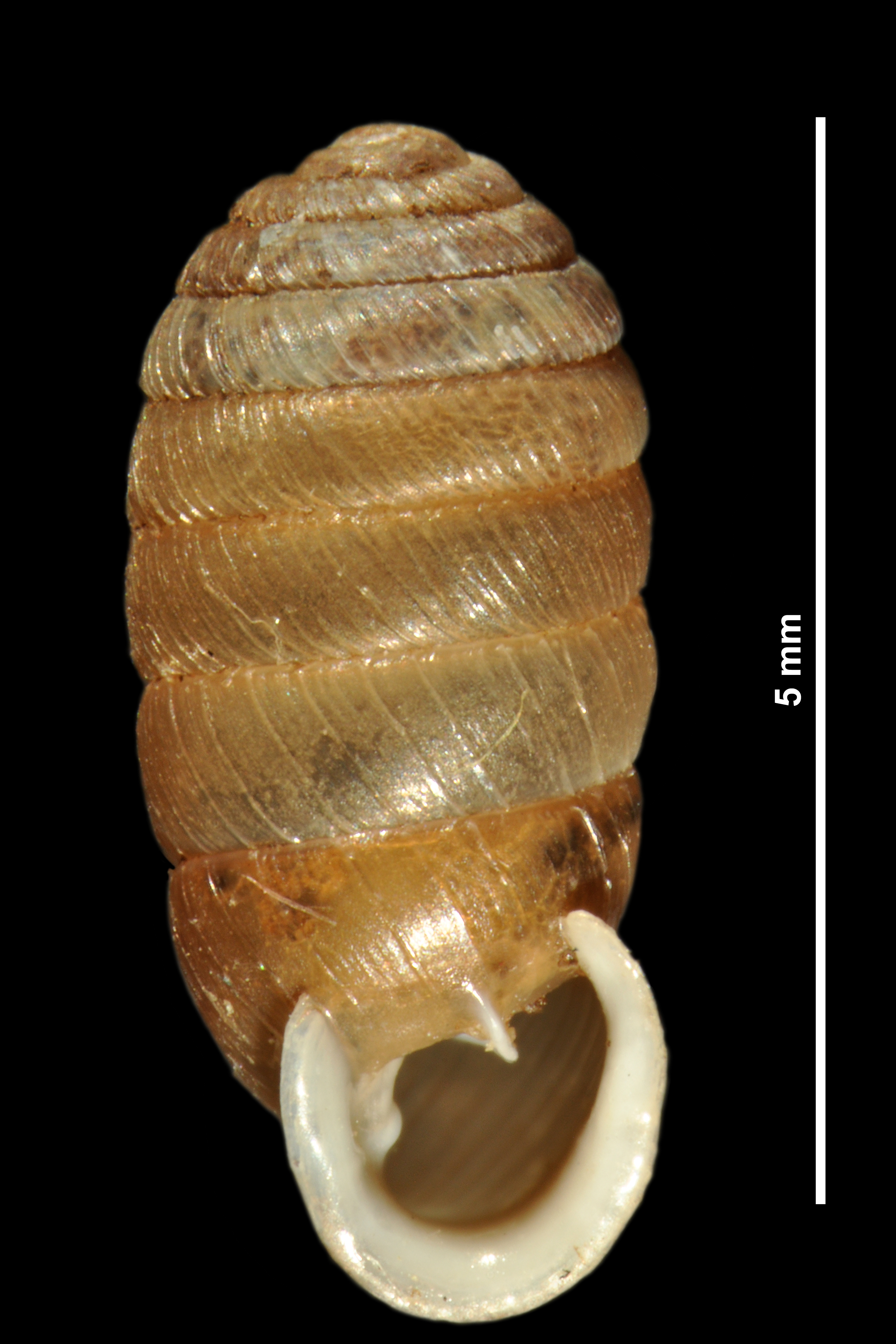
- Shell of Sphyradium doliolum (specimen at MNHN, Paris)

Conservation status
- Least Concern (IUCN 3.1)

Scientific classification
- Kingdom: Animalia
- Phylum: Mollusca
- Class: Gastropoda
- Order: Stylommatophora
- Family: Orculidae
- Genus: Sphyradium
- Species: S. doliolum

Binomial name
- Sphyradium doliolum (Bruguière, 1792)

Synonyms
- Bulimus doliolum Bruguière, 1792 (original combination); Helix coronata Studer, 1789 (treated as a nomen oblitum by Forcart (1957); Orcula (Orcula) dobrogica (Grossu, 1986) · alternate representation (junior synonym); Orcula dobrogica (Grossu, 1986) (junior synonym); Orcula doliolum (Bruguière, 1792) (unaccepted combination); Pupa (Orcula) doliolum (Bruguière, 1792) (superseded combination); Pupa (Orcula) doliolum f. unifilaris O. Boettger, 1879 (junior synonym); Pupa (Orcula) doliolum var. tereticollis Westerlund, 1896 (junior synonym); Pupa (Sphyradium) bifilaris Mousson, 1873 (junior synonym); Sphyradium dobrogicum Grossu, 1986 (junior synonym)

= Sphyradium doliolum =

Species of gastropod

Sphyradium doliolum is a species of air-breathing land snail, a terrestrial pulmonate gastropod mollusk in the family Orculidae.

== Distribution ==
The distribution of this species is central-European and southern-European. This species occurs in the following countries:

- Bulgaria
- Czech Republic - near threatened (NT)
- Netherlands
- Poland
- Slovakia
- Ukraine
- France
- and others
