= Orculella critica =

Conservation status
- Least Concern (IUCN 3.1)

Scientific classification
- Kingdom: Animalia
- Phylum: Mollusca
- Class: Gastropoda
- Order: Stylommatophora
- Family: Orculidae
- Genus: Orculella
- Species: O. critica

Binomial name
- Orculella critica (Pfeiffer, 1856)

Synonyms
- Pupa critica Pfeiffer, 1856; Orcula graecus Pilsbry, 1922; Pupa turcica Letourneux, 1884

Species of gastropod

Orculella critica is a species of air-breathing land snail, a terrestrial pulmonate gastropod mollusc in the family Orculidae.

== Geographic distribution ==
O. critica is native to Greece, where it is found in various areas of the mainland and several islands in the Aegean Sea, and Turkey, where it occurs in the country's western coast.

== See also ==
- List of non-marine molluscs of Greece
- List of non-marine molluscs of Turkey
