= Xerocrassa diensis =

Scientific classification
- Kingdom: Animalia
- Phylum: Mollusca
- Class: Gastropoda
- Order: Stylommatophora
- Family: Geomitridae
- Genus: Xerocrassa
- Species: X. diensis

Binomial name
- Xerocrassa diensis (Maltzan, 1883)

Synonyms
- Helix (Candidula?) diensis Maltzan, 1883; Helix diensis Maltzan, 1883 (original combination); Xerocrassa (Xerocrassa) diensis (Maltzan, 1883) · alternate representation

Species of gastropod

Xerocrassa diensis is a species of air-breathing land snail, a pulmonate gastropod mollusk in the family Geomitridae.

== Distribution ==
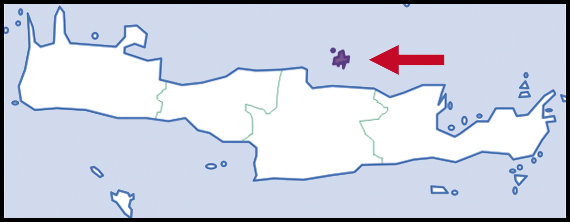
Distribution

This species is endemic to the island of Dia in Greece.

== See also ==
- List of non-marine molluscs of Greece
