= Orculella exaggerata =

Conservation status
- Least Concern (IUCN 3.1)

Scientific classification
- Kingdom: Animalia
- Phylum: Mollusca
- Class: Gastropoda
- Order: Stylommatophora
- Family: Orculidae
- Genus: Orculella
- Species: O. exaggerata

Binomial name
- Orculella exaggerata (Fuchs & Käufel, 1936)

Synonyms
- Pupa exaggerata Fuchs & Käufel, 1936; Orcula doliolum exaggerata Fuchs & Käufel, 1936

Species of gastropod

Orculella exaggerata is a species of air-breathing land snail, a terrestrial pulmonate gastropod mollusc in the family Orculidae.

== Geographic distribution ==
O. exaggerata is endemic to Greece, where it occurs on the islands of Kasos, Karpathos and Saria in the south Aegean Sea.

== See also ==
- List of non-marine molluscs of Greece
