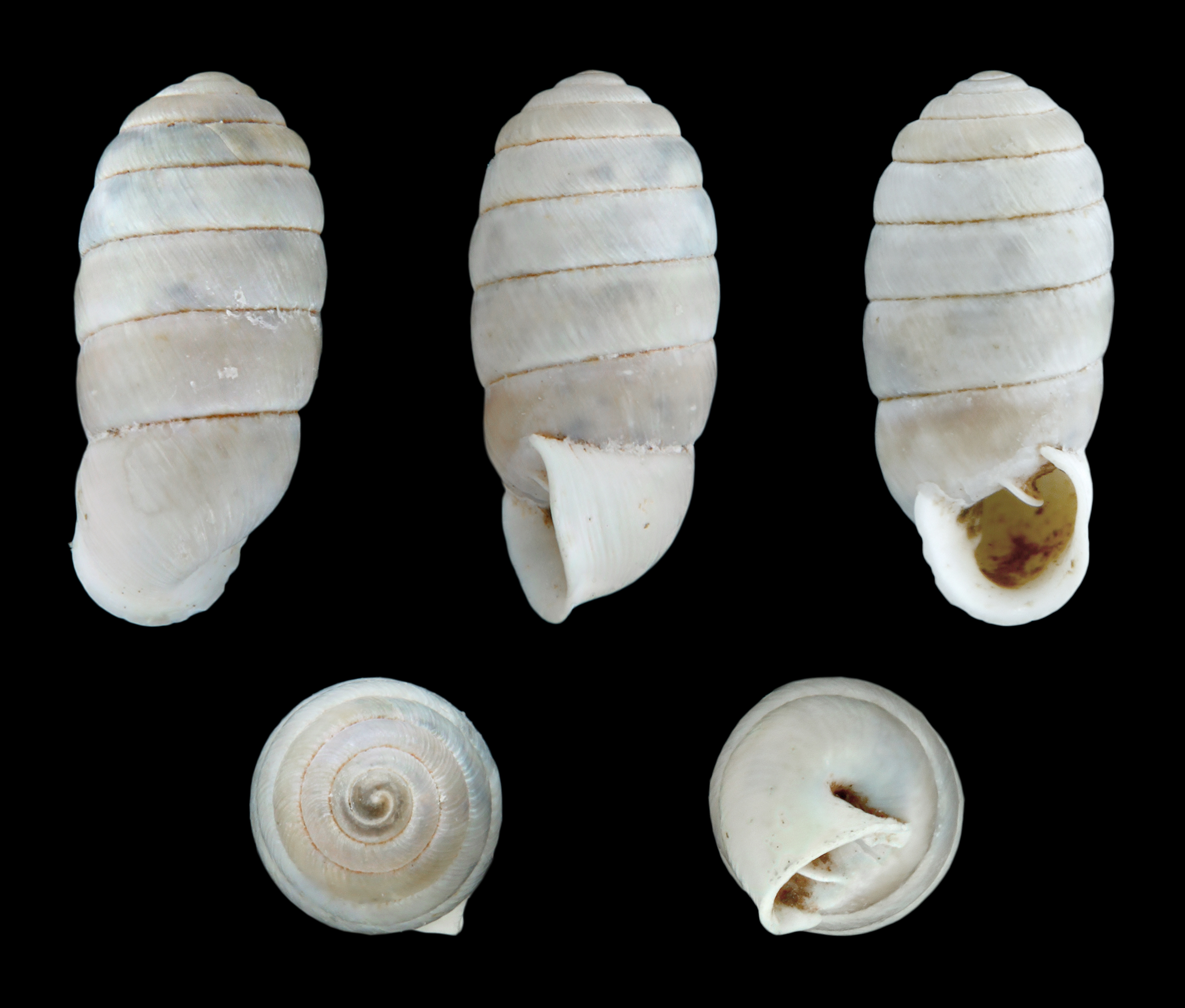

Conservation status
- Least Concern (IUCN 3.1)

Scientific classification
- Kingdom: Animalia
- Phylum: Mollusca
- Class: Gastropoda
- Order: Stylommatophora
- Family: Orculidae
- Genus: Orculella
- Species: O. ignorata

Binomial name
- Orculella ignorata Hausdorf, 1996

Synonyms
- Orcula scyphoidaea Bourguignat, 1891

= Orculella ignorata =

Species of Gastropod

Orculella ignorata is a species of air-breathing land snail, a terrestrial pulmonate gastropod mollusc in the family Orculidae.

== Geographic distribution ==
The native distribution of O. ignorata includes the northern part of the mainland, the island of Thasos and the eastern Aegean Islands in Greece, the south-western part of Bulgaria and the south and western coasts of Anatolia in Turkey.

== See also ==
- List of non-marine molluscs of Greece
- List of non-marine molluscs of Bulgaria
- List of non-marine molluscs of Turkey
