= Orculella cretioreina =

Conservation status
- Least Concern (IUCN 3.1)

Scientific classification
- Kingdom: Animalia
- Phylum: Mollusca
- Class: Gastropoda
- Order: Stylommatophora
- Family: Orculidae
- Genus: Orculella
- Species: O. cretioreina

Binomial name
- Orculella cretioreina Gittenberger & Hausdorf, 2004

Species of gastropod

Orculella cretioreina is a species of air-breathing land snail, a terrestrial pulmonate gastropod mollusc in the family Orculidae.

== Geographic distribution ==
O. cretioreina is endemic to Greece, where it occurs at disjunct locations, usually at high altitudes, on the island of Crete.

== See also ==
- List of non-marine molluscs of Greece
