= Pseudamnicola artanensis =

Scientific classification
- Kingdom: Animalia
- Phylum: Mollusca
- Class: Gastropoda
- Subclass: Caenogastropoda
- Order: Littorinimorpha
- Family: Hydrobiidae
- Genus: Pseudamnicola
- Species: P. artanensis

Binomial name
- Pseudamnicola artanensis Altaba, 2007

Species of gastropod

Pseudamnicola artanensis is a species of very small brackish water snail with an operculum, an aquatic gastropod mollusk in the family Hydrobiidae.

== Distribution ==
This species occurs in the island of Mallorca.
