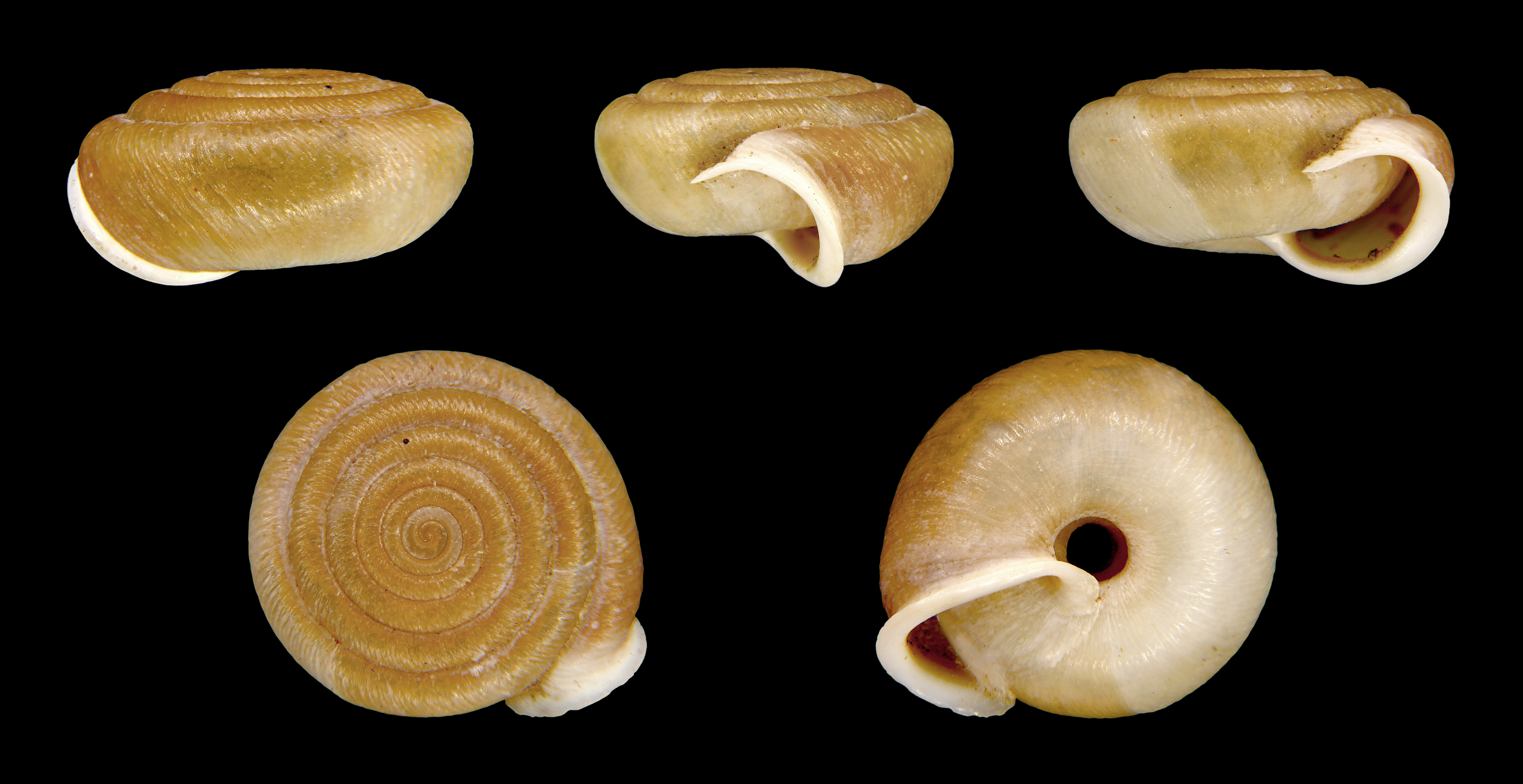
- Five views of one shell of Lindholmiola girva, Diameter 1 cm

Scientific classification
- Kingdom: Animalia
- Phylum: Mollusca
- Class: Gastropoda
- Order: Stylommatophora
- Family: Helicodontidae
- Genus: Lindholmiola; Hesse, 1931

Type species
- Helix lens Férussac, 1832

= Lindholmiola =

Genus of gastropods

Lindholmiola is a genus of air-breathing land snails, terrestrial pulmonate gastropod mollusks in the family Helicodontidae.

== Species ==
Species within the genus Lindholmiola include:

- Lindholmiola barbata
- Lindholmiola corcyrensis
- Lindholmiola girva
- Lindholmiola gyria
- Lindholmiola lens
- Lindholmiola pirinensis
- Lindholmiola regisborisi
- Lindholmiola reischuetzi
- Lindholmiola spectabilis
