= Islamia graeca =

Conservation status
- Critically endangered, possibly extinct (IUCN 3.1)

Scientific classification
- Kingdom: Animalia
- Phylum: Mollusca
- Class: Gastropoda
- Subclass: Caenogastropoda
- Order: Littorinimorpha
- Family: Hydrobiidae
- Genus: Islamia
- Species: I. graeca

Binomial name
- Islamia graeca Radoman, 1973

Species of gastropod

Islamia graeca is a species of small freshwater snail with a gill and an operculum, an aquatic gastropod mollusc or micromollusc in the family Hydrobiidae.

== Geographic distribution ==
I. graeca is endemic to Greece, where it is restricted to Lake Amvrakia, a small, deep, oligotrophic lake in the south Adriatic-Ionian region of the country.

== Conservation status ==
This species is classified by the IUCN as critically endangered and possibly extinct. Recent surveys have failed to find any specimens and the sublittoral zone, which was the species original habitat, is almost completely terrestrial nowadays, as a result of over-extraction of water from Lake Amvrakia; however, there remains a possibility that the species may survive in a small remnant of lake shore.

== See also ==
- List of non-marine molluscs of Greece
