= Schileykula =

Scientific classification
- Kingdom: Animalia
- Phylum: Mollusca
- Class: Gastropoda
- Order: Stylommatophora
- Family: Orculidae
- Genus: Schileykula; Gittenberger, 1983

Genus of gastropods

Schileykula is a genus of air-breathing land snails, terrestrial pulmonate gastropod mollusks in the family Orculidae. All of the species and subspecies in this genus inhabit Turkey, with the exception of the subspecies Schileykula scyphus crass (Pilsbry, 1922), which lives in Iran.

Species belonging to the genera Schileykula and Orculella are indistinguishable based on shell characters only. They differ however in the genitalia, primarily in the presence (Orculella) or absence (Schileykula) of a penial appendix. In Sch. batumensis and Sch. trapezensis the reproductive isolation is incomplete.

== Species and subspecies ==
Species and subspecies belonging to Schileykula include:

- Schileykula aculeata E. Gittenberger & Menkhorst, 1993
- Schileykula attilae Páll-Gergely, 2010
- Schileykula batumensis (Retowski, 1889)
- Schileykula inversa Schütt, 1993
- Schileykula nordsiecki Hausdorf, 1996
- Schileykula (?) robusta (Nägele, 1910)
- Schileykula scyphus (L. Pfeiffer, 1848)
  - Schileykula scyphus cilicica Hausdorf, 1996
  - Schileykula scyphus crassa (Pilsbry, 1922)
  - Schileykula scyphus enteroplax (Pilsbry, 1922)
  - Schileykula scyphus erecta Hausdorf, 1996
  - Schileykula scyphus lycaonica Hausdorf, 1996
  - Schileykula scyphus scyphus (L. Pfeiffer, 1848)
- Schileykula sigma Hausdorf, 1996
- Schileykula trapezensis (Stojaspal, 1981)
  - Schileykula trapezensis acampsis Hausdorf, 1996
  - Schileykula trapezensis contraria Neubert, 1993
  - Schileykula trapezensis neuberti Hausdorf, 1996
  - Schileykula trapezensis trapezensis (Stojaspal, 1981)
