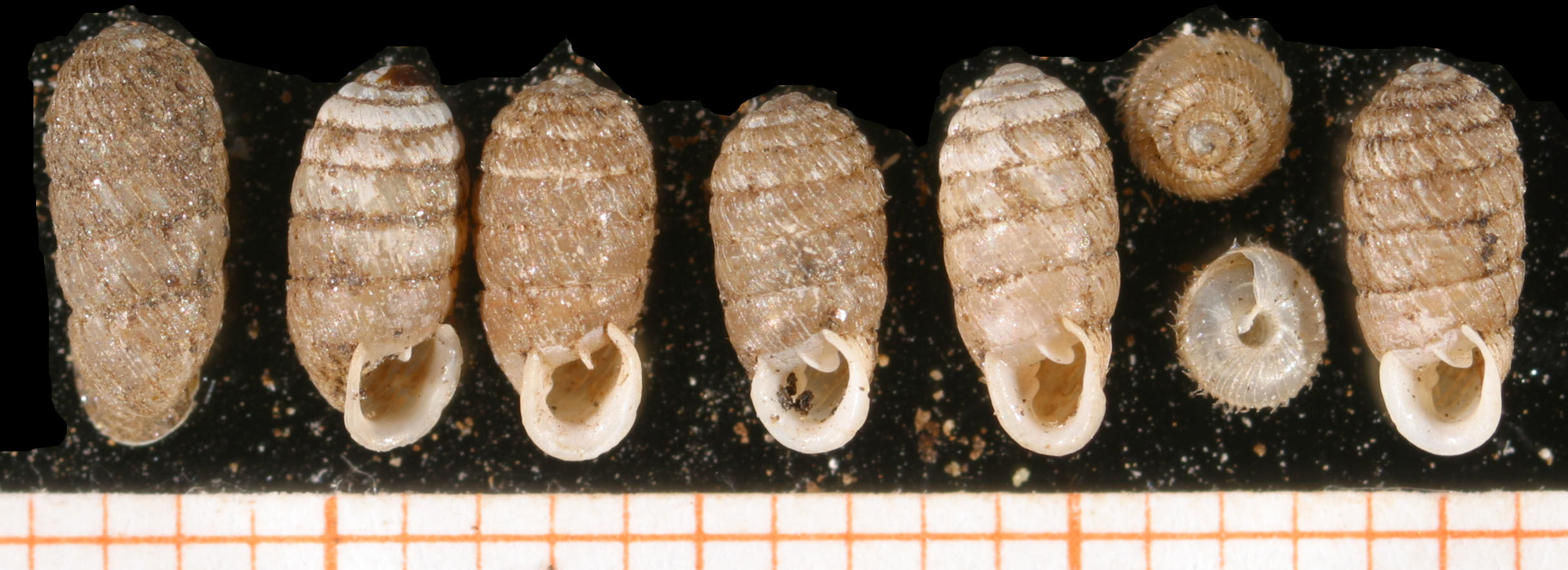

Scientific classification
- Domain: Eukaryota
- Kingdom: Animalia
- Phylum: Mollusca
- Class: Gastropoda
- Order: Stylommatophora
- Infraorder: Pupilloidei
- Superfamily: Pupilloidea
- Family: Orculidae
- Genus: Sphyradium; Charpentier, 1837

Type species
- Bulimus doliolum Bruguière, 1792

Synonyms
- Orcula (Sphyradium) Charpentier, 1837 (superseded combination); Pupa (Sphyradium) Charpentier, 1837 (original rank); Scyphus Cecconi, 1908 junior objective synonym

= Sphyradium =

Genus of gastropods

Sphyradium is a genus of very small air-breathing land snails, terrestrial pulmonate gastropod mollusks in the family Orculidae within the superfamily Pupilloidea.

== Species ==
Species within the genus Sphyradium include:

- Sphyradium doliolum (Bruguière, 1792)

Synonyms

- Sphyradium alexanderi Pilsbry & C. M. Cooke, 1906: synonym of Columella alexanderi (Pilsbry & C. M. Cooke, 1906) (original combination)
- Sphyradium dobrogicum Grossu, 1986: synonym of Sphyradium doliolum (Bruguière, 1792) (junior synonym)
- Sphyradium hasta Hanna, 1911: synonym of Columella hasta (Hanna, 1911)
- Sphyradium himalayanum (Benson, 1863): synonym of Truncatellina himalayana (Benson, 1863) (unaccepted combination)
- Sphyradium parreyssii (L. Pfeiffer, 1848): synonym of Agardhiella parreyssii (L. Pfeiffer, 1848) (superseded combination)
- Sphyradium sharpi Pilsbry & C. M. Cooke, 1906: synonym of Columella sharpi (Pilsbry & C. M. Cooke, 1906) (original combination)
