= Islamia hadei =

Conservation status
- Critically endangered, possibly extinct (IUCN 3.1)

Scientific classification
- Kingdom: Animalia
- Phylum: Mollusca
- Class: Gastropoda
- Subclass: Caenogastropoda
- Order: Littorinimorpha
- Family: Hydrobiidae
- Genus: Islamia
- Species: I. hadei

Binomial name
- Islamia hadei (Gittenberger, 1982)

Synonyms
- Daphniola hadei (Gittenberger, 1982); Hauffenia hadei (Gittenberger, 1982); Horatia hadei Gittenberger, 1982

Species of gastropod

Islamia hadei is a species of small freshwater snail with a gill and an operculum, an aquatic gastropod mollusc or micromollusc in the family Hydrobiidae.

== Taxonomic note ==
Fauna Europaea recognises two subspecies : Islamia hadei subsp. hadei (E. Gittenberger 1982) and Islamia hadei subsp. molai (A. Reischutz & P.L. Reischutz 2008).

== Geographic distribution ==
Islamia hadei is endemic to Greece, where it where it is only known from a small spring 5 km southwest of Githion.

== Conservation status ==
This species is currently classified by the IUCN as critically endangered and possibly extinct. The spring it was originally recorded from is being used to provide water for domestic purposes and recent surveys have failed to find any specimens; however, it may still survive in groundwater or a small remnant of the spring.

== See also ==
- List of non-marine molluscs of Greece
