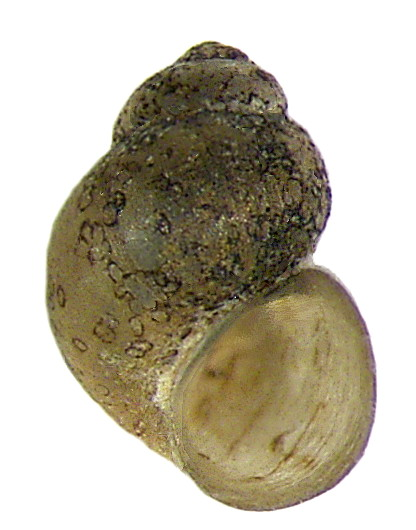

Scientific classification
- Kingdom: Animalia
- Phylum: Mollusca
- Class: Gastropoda
- Subclass: Caenogastropoda
- Order: Littorinimorpha
- Family: Hydrobiidae
- Subfamily: Pseudamnicolinae
- Genus: Pseudamnicola; Paulucci, 1878

Type species
- Paludina macrostoma Küster, 1853

Synonyms
- Adrioinsulana Radoman, 1978 (a junior synonym); † Limnidia Schütt, 1973 (genus level not accepted); Paludinella (Pseudamnicola) Paulucci, 1878; † Pseudamnicola (Barassia) Jekelius, 1933 · accepted, alternate representation; † Pseudamnicola (Corona) Jekelius, 1932 (Invalid: junior homonym of Corona Récluz, 1850 [Neritidae] and Corona Albers, 1850 [Orthalicidae]; Barassia is a replacement name.); † Pseudamnicola (Limnidia) Schütt in Schütt & Besenecker, 1973 · accepted, alternate representation; Pseudamnicola (Pseudamnicola) Paulucci, 1878 · accepted, alternate representation; Pseudoamnicola Paulucci, 1878 (misspelling)

= Pseudamnicola =

Genus of gastropods

Pseudamnicola is a genus of small brackish water snails with an operculum, aquatic gastropod mollusks in the subfamily Pseudamnicolinae of the family Hydrobiidae.

Pseudamnicola is the type genus of the subfamily Pseudamnicolinae.

== Species ==
Species in the genus Pseudamnicola include:

- † Pseudamnicola abxazica Badzoshvili, 1979
- Pseudamnicola algeriensis Glöer, Bouzid & Boeters, 2010
- † Pseudamnicola almerodensis (Ludwig, 1865)
- † Pseudamnicola ampla Pană, 2005 (nomen nudum)
- Pseudamnicola artanensis Altaba, 2007
- † Pseudamnicola arvernensis (Bouillet, 1835)
- † Pseudamnicola atropidus (Brusina, 1892)
- † Pseudamnicola babindolensis Neubauer, Kroh, Harzhauser, Georgopoulou & Mandic, 2015
- † Pseudamnicola babukici Brusina, 1902
- Pseudamnicola bacescui Grossu, 1986
- Pseudamnicola barratei Letourneux & Bourguignat, 1887
- Pseudamnicola beckmanni Glöer & Zettler, 2007
- Pseudamnicola bilgini Schütt & Şeşen, 1993
- † Pseudamnicola bilineatus (Simionescu & Barbu, 1940)
- † Pseudamnicola bithynoides Jekelius, 1932
- Pseudamnicola boucheti Glöer, Bouzid & Boeters, 2010
- Pseudamnicola brachia Westerlund, 1886
- † Pseudamnicola buxinensis W. Yü & X.-Q. Zhang, 1982
- † Pseudamnicola buzoiensis Pană, 2003
- Pseudamnicola calamensis Glöer, Bouzid & Boeters, 2010
- Pseudamnicola canariensis Glöer & Reuselaars, 2020
- † Pseudamnicola capellinii (Wenz, 1919)
- † Pseudamnicola carenosuturata Pană, 2005 (nomen nudum, unavailable according to Art. 16.4.1.: no types fixed)
- Pseudamnicola chabii Glöer, Bouzid & Boeters, 2010
- Pseudamnicola chamasensis Boeters, 2000
- Pseudamnicola chia (E. von Martens, 1889)
- Pseudamnicola codreanui Glöer, Bouzid & Boeters, 2010
- Pseudamnicola cirikorum D. Odabaşı, 2019
- Pseudamnicola confinis (Brancsik, 1897)
- Pseudamnicola conovula (Frauenfeld, 1863)
- Pseudamnicola constantinae (Letourneux, 1870)
- † Pseudamnicola convexus Sandberger, 1875
- † Pseudamnicola cous Willmann, 1981
- † Pseudamnicola cuisensis (Cossmann & Pissarro, 1913)
- † Pseudamnicola curtus (Reuss, 1867)
- † Pseudamnicola cyclostomoides (Sinzov, 1880)
- Pseudamnicola dobrogicus Grossu, 1986
- † Pseudamnicola dodecanesiacus Willmann, 1981
- † Pseudamnicola dromicus (Fontannes, 1881)
- Pseudamnicola doumeti Letourneux & Bourguignat, 1887
- † Pseudamnicola elachyspira (Fontannes, 1884)
- Pseudamnicola elbursensis (Starmühlner & Edlauer, 1957)
- † Pseudamnicola elongatus Taner, 1974
- Pseudamnicola emilianus (Paladilhe, 1869)
- Pseudamnicola exilis (Frauenfeld, 1863)
- Pseudamnicola fineti Glöer, Bouzid & Boeters, 2010
- † Pseudamnicola fuxinensis X.-H. Yu, 1987
- Pseudamnicola georgievi Glöer & Pešić, 2012
- † Pseudamnicola gerannensis Rey, 1974
- Pseudamnicola gerhardfalkneri Glöer, Bouzid & Boeters, 2010
- Pseudamnicola ghamizii Glöer, Bouzid & Boeters, 2010
- † Pseudamnicola giustii Kadolsky, 2008
- Pseudamnicola globulina Letourneux & Bourguignat, 1887
- † Pseudamnicola globuloides (F. Sandberger, 1871)
- Pseudamnicola goksunensis Glöer, Gürlek & Kara, 2014
- Pseudamnicola granjaensis Glöer & Zettler, 2007
- Pseudamnicola gullei Glöer, Yıldırım & Kebapçi, 2015
- † Pseudamnicola haianensis Gu in Gu & Wang, 1989
- † Pseudamnicola hebraicus (Schütt in Schütt & Ortal, 1993)
- † Pseudamnicola hungaricus (Frauenfeld, 1862)
- Pseudamnicola ianthe Radea & Parmakelis, 2016
- Pseudamnicola ilione Radea & Parmakelis, 2016
- † Pseudamnicola inflatus Jekelius, 1944
- Pseudamnicola intranodosus Schütt & Şeşen, 1993
- † Pseudamnicola jolyi Pallary, 1901
- † Pseudamnicola jurassicus W. Yü, 1974
- Pseudamnicola kavosensis Glöer & Zettler, 2021
- Pseudamnicola kayseriensis Glöer, Yıldırım & Kebapçi, 2015
- † Pseudamnicola kerchensis Iljina in Iljina et al., 1976
- Pseudamnicola kotschyi Frauenfeld, 1863
- Pseudamnicola krumensis Glöer, Grego, Erőss & Fehér, 2015
- † Pseudamnicola laevigatus (Jekelius, 1932)
- Pseudamnicola latasteana Letourneux & Bourguignat, 1887
- † Pseudamnicola leognanensis (Cossmann & Peyrot, 1918)
- Pseudamnicola leontinus Grossu, 1986
- Pseudamnicola leprevieri (Pallary, 1928)
- Pseudamnicola lesbosensis Glöer & Reuselaars, 2020
- Pseudamnicola letourneuxianus (Bourguignat, 1862)
- † Pseudamnicola liaoxiensis X.-H. Yu, 1987
- Pseudamnicola limnosensis Glöer, Stefanov & Georgiev, 2018
- Pseudamnicola linae Glöer, Bouzid & Boeters, 2010
- Pseudamnicola lindbergi C.R. Boettger, 1957
- † Pseudamnicola lobostoma Schütt in Schütt & Besenecker, 1973
- Pseudamnicola lucensis (Issel, 1866)
- Pseudamnicola luteolus (Küster, 1852)
- Pseudamnicola macrostoma (Küster, 1852)
- Pseudamnicola magdalenae Falniowski, 2016
- Pseudamnicola malickyi Schütt, 1980
- Pseudamnicola marashi Glöer, Gürlek & Kara, 2014
- † Pseudamnicola margarita (Neumayr in Herbich & Neumayr, 1875)
- † Pseudamnicola margaritaeformis (Andrusov, 1905)
- † Pseudamnicola margaritulus (Fuchs, 1870)
- Pseudamnicola meloussensis Altaba, 2007
- Pseudamnicola meluzzii Boeters, 1976
- Pseudamnicola meralae Glöer, Gürlek & Kara, 2014
- † Pseudamnicola messapicus Esu & Girotti, 2010
- † Pseudamnicola micromphalus (O. Boettger, 1869)
- † Pseudamnicola minimus (Lörenthey, 1893)
- Pseudamnicola mitataensis Glöer & Porfyris, 2020
- † Pseudamnicola mocsaryi (Brusina, 1902)
- † Pseudamnicola monotropidus (Brusina, 1892)
- Pseudamnicola moussonii (Calcara, 1841)
- † Pseudamnicola muelleri (O. Boettger, 1884)
- Pseudamnicola negropontinus (Clessin, 1878)
- Pseudamnicola numidicus (Clessin, 1878)
- † Pseudamnicola nympha (Eichwald, 1853)
- † Pseudamnicola nysti (De Boissy, 1848)
- Pseudamnicola occultus Glöer & Hirschfelder, 2019
- † Pseudamnicola opimus W. Yü, 1977
- † Pseudamnicola orientalis (Bukowski, 1896) (taxon inquirendum)
- Pseudamnicola orsinii (Küster, 1852)
- Pseudamnicola ouarzazatensis Boulaassafer, Ghamizi, Machordom & Delicado, 2020
- Pseudamnicola oudrefica (Letourneux & Bourguignat, 1887)
- †Pseudamnicola ovatus (Bouillet, 1835)
- † Pseudamnicola oxispiriformis (Roman, 1912)
- † Pseudamnicola oxyspira (Cossmann, 1888)
- † Pseudamnicola pagoda (Neumayr in Herbich & Neumayr, 1875)
- † Pseudamnicola pagodaeformis (Andrusov, 1890)
- † Pseudamnicola palmariggii Esu & Girotti, 2010
- † Pseudamnicola partschi (Frauenfeld in Hörnes, 1856)
- † Pseudamnicola pasiphae Willmann, 1980
- Pseudamnicola penchinati (Bourguignat, 1870)
- † Pseudamnicola pequignoti Pallary, 1901
- Pseudamnicola pieperi Schütt, 1980
- Pseudamnicola pisolinus (Paladilhe, 1876) (taxon inquirendum)
- † Pseudamnicola pistati (Cossmann, 1907)
- Pseudamnicola prasinus Rosen, 1903
- † Pseudamnicola proximoides (Capellini, 1880)
- † Pseudamnicola proximus (Fuchs, 1870)
- † Pseudamnicola proximoides (Capellini, 1880)
- † Pseudamnicola pumilus Brusina, 1884
- † Pseudamnicola purpurinus (Andrusov, 1890)
- Pseudamnicola pyrenaicus Boeters & Falkner, 2009
- Pseudamnicola radeae D. Odabaşı, 2019
- Pseudamnicola ragia Letourneux & Bourguignat, 1887
- Pseudamnicola ramosae Boulaassafer, Ghamizi, Machordom & Delicado, 2020
- Pseudamnicola razelmianus Grossu, 1986
- † Pseudamnicola rotundatus (Montpéreux, 1831)
- Pseudamnicola rouagi Glöer, Bouzid & Boeters, 2010
- † Pseudamnicola rueppelli (Boettger, 1884)
- † Pseudamnicola rumanianus Pană, 2003
- † Pseudamnicola rutoti (Cossmann, 1924)
- Pseudamnicola samosensis Glöer & Reuselaars, 2020
- † Pseudamnicola schottleri (Wenz, 1922)
- Pseudamnicola sciaccaensis Glöer & Beckmann, 2007
- Pseudamnicola singularis Letourneux & Bourguignat, 1887
- Pseudamnicola skalaensis Glöer & Reuselaars, 2020
- † Pseudamnicola skhiadicus (Bukowski, 1896)
- Pseudamnicola solitarius Tchernov, 1971
- Pseudamnicola spiratus (Paladilhe, 1869)
- Pseudamnicola stasimoensis Glöer & Reuselaars, 2020
- † Pseudamnicola subglobulus (d'Orbigny, 1852)
- † Pseudamnicola suevicus (Gottschick, 1928)
- Pseudamnicola sumbasensis Gürlek, 2019
- † Pseudamnicola taoyuanensis Youluo, 1978
- † Pseudamnicola terebra (Brongniart, 1810)
- Pseudamnicola thalesi Odabaşı, Akay & Koyuncuoğlu, 2020
- † Pseudamnicola tholosus Jekelius, 1944
- † Pseudamnicola transilvanicus (Brusina, 1902)
- † Pseudamnicola triangula Pană, 2005 (nomen nudum, unavailable according to Art. 16.4.1.: no types fixed)
- Pseudamnicola troglobia Bole, 1961 (species inquirenda)
- † Pseudamnicola turonensis (Sandberger, 1875)
- † Pseudamnicola ultramontanus Wenz, 1919
- † Pseudamnicola vicinus (Staadt in Cossmann & Pissarro, 1913)
- Pseudamnicola vinarskii Glöer & Georgiev, 2012
- Pseudamnicola virescens (Küster, 1853)
- † Pseudamnicola welterschultesi Neubauer, Harzhauser, Kroh, Georgopoulou & Mandic, 2014
- † Pseudamnicola zonatus (Eichwald, 1853)

Subgenera and species brought into synonymy

- Subgenus Pseudamnicola (Corrosella) Boeters, 1970 represented as Pseudamnicola Paulucci, 1878 (alternate representation)
- Subgenus Pseudamnicola (Pseudamnicola) Paulucci, 1878 represented as Pseudamnicola Paulucci, 1878 (alternate representation)
- Subgenus † Pseudamnicola (Aluta) Jekelius, 1932: synonym of † Aluta Jekelius, 1932
- Subgenus Pseudamnicola (Andrussowiella) Wenz, 1939: synonym of Tanousia Servain, 1881
- Subgenus † Pseudamnicola (Bania) Brusina, 1896: synonym of † Bania Brusina, 1896
- Subgenus † Pseudamnicola (Corona) Jekelius, 1932: synonym of † Pseudamnicola (Barassia) Jekelius, 1933
- Subgenus Pseudamnicola (Sandria) Brusina, 1886: synonym of Tanousia Servain, 1881
- Subgenus † Pseudamnicola (Staja) Brusina, 1897: synonym of † Staja Brusina, 1897
- Pseudamnicola anteisensis Bérenguier, 1882: synonym of Corrosella astierii (Dupuy, 1851)
- Pseudamnicola astierii Dupuy, 1851: synonym of Corrosella astierii (Dupuy, 1851)
- † Pseudamnicola atava (Andrusov, 1890): synonym of † Tanousia atava (Andrusov, 1890)
- † Pseudamnicola atropida (Brusina, 1892): synonym of † Hydrobia atropida Brusina, 1892
- Pseudamnicola brusiniana (Clessin & W. Dybowski in W. Dybowski, 1888): synonym of Abeskunus brusinianus (Clessin & W. Dybowski in W. Dybowski, 1887)
- Pseudamnicola chamasensis Boeters, 2000: synonym of Pseudamnicola moussonii (Calcara, 1841)
- Pseudamnicola confusa (Frauenfeld, 1863): synonym of Mercuria confusa (Frauenfeld, 1863)
- Pseudamnicola cyrniacus (J. Mabille, 1869): synonym of Pseudamnicola moussonii (Calcara, 1841)
- Pseudamnicola depressispira Logvinenko & Starobogatov, 1968: synonym of Abeskunus depressispira (Logvinenko & Starobogatov, 1969)
- Pseudamnicola desertorum (Bourguignat, 1862): synonym of Pseudamnicola letourneuxiana (Bourguignat, 1862)
- Pseudamnicola exigua (Eichwald, 1838): synonym of Abeskunus exiguus (Eichwald, 1838)
- Pseudamnicola falkneri (Boeters, 1970): synonym of Corrosella falkneri Boeters, 1970
- Pseudamnicola gasulli Boeters, 1981: synonym of Diegus gasulli (Boeters, 1981) (original combination)
- Pseudamnicola geldiayana Schütt & Bilgin, 1970: synonym of Erosiconcha geldiayana (Schütt & Bilgin, 1970) (original combination)
- Pseudamnicola hauffei Delicado & Ramos, 2012: synonym of Corrosella herreroi (Bech, 1993)
- † Pseudamnicola helicella (Sandberger, 1859): synonym of † Mercuria helicella (F. Sandberger, 1858) (new combination)
- Pseudamnicola hinzi Boeters, 1986: synonym of Corrosella hinzi (Boeters, 1986)(original combination)
- † Pseudamnicola hoeckae Harzhauser & Binder, 2004: synonym of † Bania hoeckae (Harzhauser & Binder, 2004)
- Pseudamnicola hydrobiopsis Boeters, 1999: synonym of Corrosella hydrobiopsis (Boeters, 1999)
- † Pseudamnicola immutata (Hörnes, 1856): synonym of † Bania immutata (Hörnes, 1856)
- Pseudamnicola kermanshahensis Glöer & Pešić, 2009: synonym of Sarkhia kermanshahensis (Glöer & Pešić, 2009)
- Pseudamnicola luisi Boeters, 1984: synonym of Corrosella luisi (Boeters, 1984) (basionym)
- † Pseudamnicola minima (Fuchs, 1877): synonym of † Pseudamnicola welterschultesi Neubauer, Harzhauser, Kroh, Georgopoulou & Mandic, 2014
- Pseudamnicola navasiana (Fagot, 1907): synonym of Corrosella navasiana (Fagot, 1907)
- Pseudamnicola pallaryi Ghamizi, Vala & Bouka, 1997: synonym of Corrosella pallaryi (Ghamizi, Vala & Bouka, 1997) (basionym)
- † Pseudamnicola pauluccii Brusina, 1907: synonym of † Bania pauluccii (Brusina, 1907)
- † Pseudamnicola producta Jekelius, 1944: synonym of † Aluta producta (Jekelius, 1944)
- Pseudamnicola pseudoglobulus (d'Orbigny, 1852): synonym of † Bania pseudoglobula (d'Orbigny, 1852)
- Pseudamnicola raddei Boettger, 1889: synonym of Turkmenamnicola raddei (Boettger, 1889)
- † Pseudamnicola romaniana Pană, 2003: synonym of † Pseudamnicola rumaniana Pană, 2003
- Pseudamnicola saboori Glöer & Pešić, 2009: synonym of Persipyrgula saboori (Glöer & Pešić, 2009) (original combination)
- † Pseudamnicola sarmatica Jekelius, 1944: synonym of † Staja sarmatica (Jekelius, 1944)
- Pseudamnicola sphaerion (Mousson, 1863): synonym of Abeskunus exiguus (Eichwald, 1838) (junior synonym)
- † Pseudamnicola steinheimensis (Miller, 1900): synonym of † Bania pseudoglobula steinheimensis (Miller, 1900)
- † Pseudamnicola stosiciana (Brusina, 1874): synonym of † Bania stosiciana (Brusina, 1874)
- Pseudamnicola subproducta (Paladilhe, 1869): synonym of Pseudamnicola spiratus (Paladilhe, 1869)
- † Pseudamnicola torbarianus (Brusina, 1874): synonym of † Bania torbariana (Brusina, 1874)
- Pseudamnicola tramuntanae Altaba, 2007: synonym of Pseudamnicola beckmanni Glöer & Zettler, 2007
- † Pseudamnicola urosevici Pavlović, 1922: synonym of † Bania urosevici (Pavlović, 1931)
- Pseudamnicola zagrosensis Glöer & Pešić, 2009: synonym of Intermaria zagrosensis (Glöer & Pešić, 2009)
- Pseudamnicola (Barassia) purpurina (Andrusov, 1890): synonym of † Pyrgula purpurina Andrusov, 1890
