= Gyralina =

Scientific classification
- Domain: Eukaryota
- Kingdom: Animalia
- Phylum: Mollusca
- Class: Gastropoda
- Order: Stylommatophora
- Family: Pristilomatidae
- Genus: Gyralina; Andreae, 1902

Genus of gastropods

Gyralina is a genus of air-breathing land snails, terrestrial pulmonate gastropod mollusks in the family Pristilomatidae.

== Species ==
Species within the genus Gyralina include:

- Gyralina candida (Wagner, 1909)
- Gyralina circumlineata (Pfeiffer, 1846)
- Gyralina hausdorfi Riedel, 1990, extinct
