= Pseudamnicola meloussensis =

Scientific classification
- Kingdom: Animalia
- Phylum: Mollusca
- Class: Gastropoda
- Subclass: Caenogastropoda
- Order: Littorinimorpha
- Family: Hydrobiidae
- Genus: Pseudamnicola
- Species: P. meloussensis

Binomial name
- Pseudamnicola meloussensis Altaba, 2007

Species of gastropod

Pseudamnicola meloussensis is a species of small brackish water snails with an operculum, aquatic gastropod mollusks in the family Hydrobiidae.

== Distribution ==
This species occurs on the Mediterranean island of Mallorca.
