= Pseudamnicola pisolinus =

Conservation status
- Data Deficient (IUCN 3.1)

Scientific classification
- Kingdom: Animalia
- Phylum: Mollusca
- Class: Gastropoda
- Subclass: Caenogastropoda
- Order: Littorinimorpha
- Family: Hydrobiidae
- Subfamily: Pseudamnicolinae
- Genus: Pseudamnicola
- Species: P. pisolinus

Binomial name
- Pseudamnicola pisolinus Paladilhe in 1876

Species of mollusc

Pseudamnicola pisolinus is a species of mollusc in the genus Pseudamnicola.

This is a taxon inquirendum.
