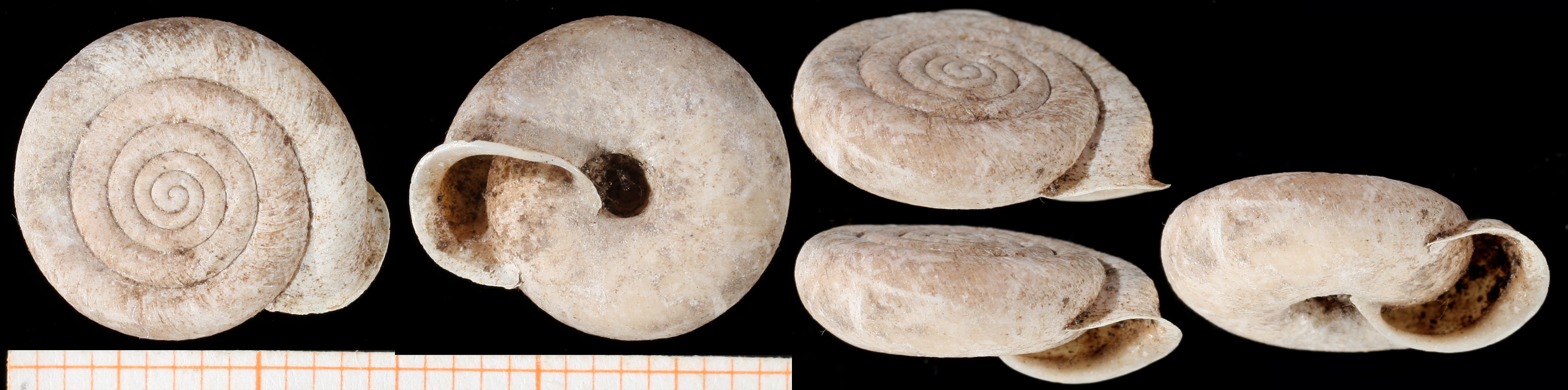

Conservation status
- Least Concern (IUCN 3.1)

Scientific classification
- Kingdom: Animalia
- Phylum: Mollusca
- Class: Gastropoda
- Order: Stylommatophora
- Family: Helicodontidae
- Genus: Lindholmiola
- Species: L. regisborisi

Binomial name
- Lindholmiola regisborisi (A. J. Wagner, 1928)

Synonyms
- Helicodonta regisborisi A.J. Wagner, 1928

= Lindholmiola regisborisi =

Species of gastropod

Lindholmiola regisborisi is a species of air-breathing land snail, a terrestrial pulmonate gastropod mollusc in the family Helicodontidae.

== Geographic distribution ==
The native distribution of L. regisborisi is a small area around the river Nestos and the island of Thasos in north-eastern Greece. An isolated record from Marmara Adası, the first of this species for Turkey, is probably the result of an introduction due to anthropogenic activities.

== See also ==
- List of non-marine molluscs of Greece
