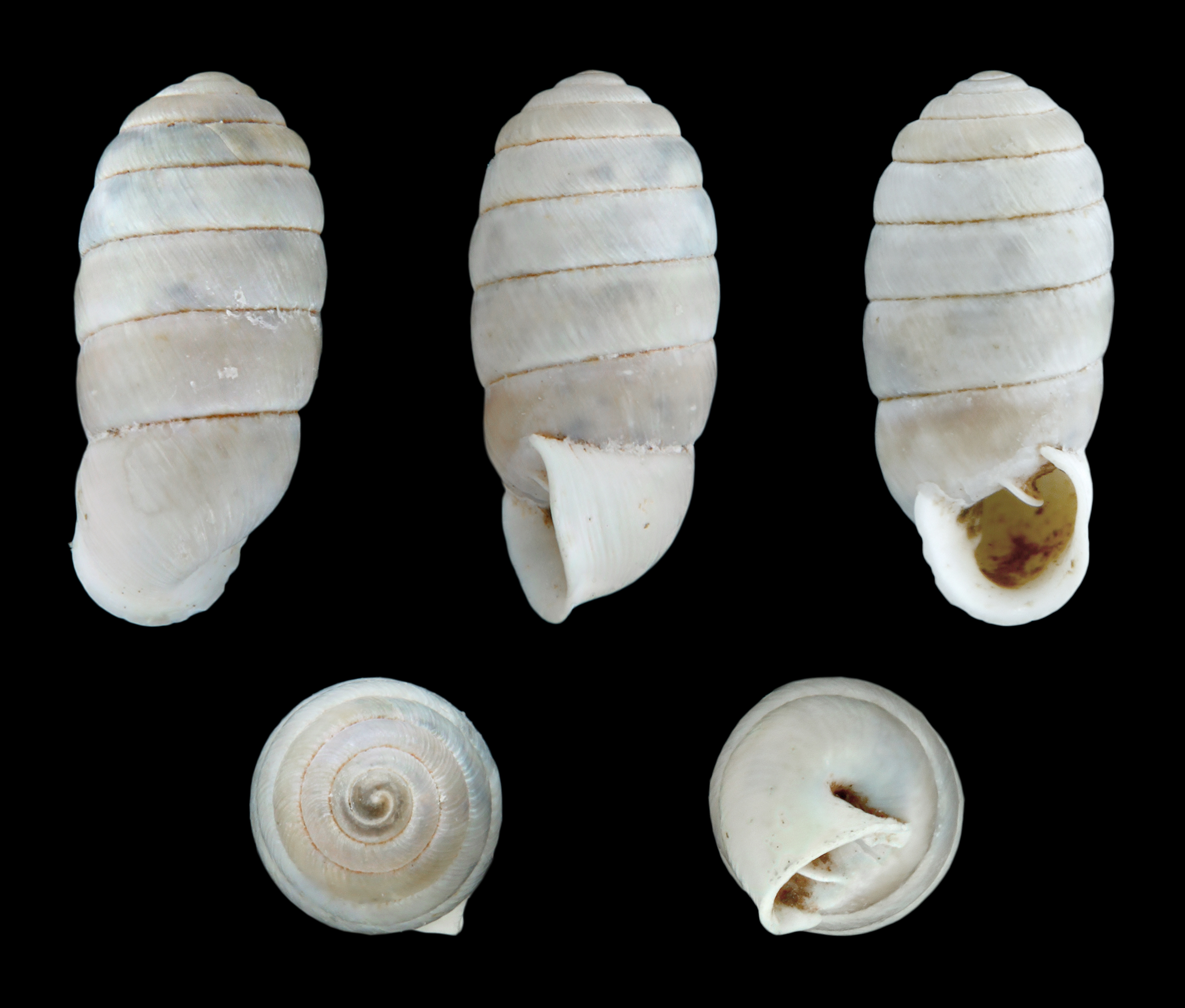
- Five views of a shell of Orculella ignorata Hausdorf, 1996

Scientific classification
- Kingdom: Animalia
- Phylum: Mollusca
- Class: Gastropoda
- Order: Stylommatophora
- Family: Orculidae
- Genus: Orculella; Steenberg, 1983

= Orculella =

Genus of gastropods

Orculella is a genus of air-breathing land snails, terrestrial pulmonate gastropod mollusks in the family Orculidae. The genus Orculella occurs in the whole Mediterranean region. The richest areas in terms of species are Turkey and the Middle East, the Aegean Islands (mainly Crete) and Libya (Cyrenaica). A few species inhabit Southern Spain (O. bulgarica), Sicily (O. templorum) and northeastern Africa (O. tingitana).

Species in the genera Schileykula and Orculella are indistinguishable based on shell characters only. They differ however in the genitalia, primarily in the presence (Orculella) or absence (Schileykula) of a penial appendix.

== Species and subspecies ==
Species and subspecies in the genus Orculella include:

- Orculella astirakiensis Gittenberger & Hausdorf 2004
- Orculella brandti (Zilch 1960)
- Orculella bulgarica bulgarica (P. Hesse 1915)
- Orculella bulgarica lamellata Hausdorf, 1996
- Orculella caabensis (Brandt 1956)
- Orculella connollyi (Brandt 1956)
- Orculella creantirudis Gittenberger & Hausdorf 2004
- Orculella creticostata Gittenberger & Hausdorf 2004
- Orculella cretilasithi Gittenberger & Hausdorf 2004
- Orculella cretimaxima Gittenberger & Hausdorf 2004
- Orculella cretiminuta Gittenberger & Hausdorf 2004
- Orculella cretioreina Gittenberger & Hausdorf 2004
- Orculella critica (L. Pfeiffer 1856)
- Orculella diensis Gittenberger & Hausdorf 2004
- Orculella driana (Klatenbach 1943)
- Orculella elongata (Klatenbach 1943)
- Orculella exaggerata (Fuchs & Käufel 1936)
- Orculella farzughana (Brandt 1956)
- Orculella fodela Gittenberger & Hausdorf 2004
- Orculella franciscoi Gittenberger & Hausdorf 2004
- Orculella garzanensis Schütt, 1996
- Orculella gregoryi (Brandt 1956)
- Orculella? heterostropha commagenensis (Neubert, 1988)
- Orculella? heterostropha heterostropha (O. Boettger, 1905)
- Orculella ignorata Hausdorf, 1996
- Orculella kaltenbachi (Brandt 1956)
- Orculella mayi (Brandt 1956)
- Orculella menkhorsti menkhorsti Hausdorf, 1996
- Orculella menkhorsti sinistrorsa Hausdorf, 1996
- Orculella mesopotamica mesopotamica (Mousson, 1874)
- Orculella mesopotamica riedeli Hausdorf, 1996
- Orculella multidentata (Klatenbach 1943)
- Orculella scalaris Gittenberger & Hausdorf 2004
- Orculella orientalis (L. Pfeiffer 1861)
- Orculella pabsti (Brandt 1956)
- Orculella? palatalis (Pilsbry 1922)
- Orculella pfeiferi Hausdorf 1996
- Orculella regimaensis (Brandt 1956)
- Orculella ruderalis urartaeica Hausdorf 1996
- Orculella sirianocoriensis libanotica (Tristram 1865)
- Orculella sirianocoriensis sirianocoriensis (Mousson 1854)
- Orculella striata (Kaltenbach 1943)
- Orculella templorum templorum (Benoit 1862)
- Orculella templorum tripolitana (Kaltenbach 1943)
- Orculella tingitana (Pallary 1918)
- Orculella tomlini (Connolly 1942)
