= Islamia bendidis =

Conservation status
- Critically endangered, possibly extinct (IUCN 3.1)

Scientific classification
- Kingdom: Animalia
- Phylum: Mollusca
- Class: Gastropoda
- Subclass: Caenogastropoda
- Order: Littorinimorpha
- Family: Hydrobiidae
- Genus: Islamia
- Species: I. bendidis

Binomial name
- Islamia bendidis Reischütz, 1988

Species of gastropod

Islamia bendidis is a species of small freshwater snail with a gill and an operculum, an aquatic gastropod mollusc or micromollusc in the family Hydrobiidae.

== Etymology ==
I. bendidis is named after the Thracian goddess Bendis.

== Geographic distribution ==
I. bendidis is endemic to the island of Samothrace in Greece.

== Conservation status ==
This species is currently classified by the IUCN as critically endangered and possibly extinct. At the time of its original description it was already considered highly threatened, as the freshwater springs and streams that constitute its habitat are being exploited to provide water for domestic purposes, and recent surveys have failed to find any specimens at any of the five locations it was known from.

== See also ==
- List of non-marine molluscs of Greece
