= Lindholmiola reischuetzi =

Conservation status
- Least Concern (IUCN 3.1)

Scientific classification
- Kingdom: Animalia
- Phylum: Mollusca
- Class: Gastropoda
- Order: Stylommatophora
- Family: Helicodontidae
- Genus: Lindholmiola
- Species: L. reischuetzi

Binomial name
- Lindholmiola reischuetzi Falkner, 1995

Species of gastropod

Lindholmiola reischuetzi is a species of air-breathing land snail, a terrestrial pulmonate gastropod mollusc in the family Helicodontidae.

== Geographic distribution ==
This species is endemic to Greece, where it occurs on the island of Thasos and in the northern part of the country's mainland.

== See also ==
- List of non-marine molluscs of Greece
