= Pseudamnicola beckmanni =

Scientific classification
- Kingdom: Animalia
- Phylum: Mollusca
- Class: Gastropoda
- Subclass: Caenogastropoda
- Order: Littorinimorpha
- Family: Hydrobiidae
- Genus: Pseudamnicola
- Species: P. beckmanni

Binomial name
- Pseudamnicola beckmanni Glöer & Zettler, 2007

Synonyms
- Pseudamnicola (Pseudamnicola) beckmanni Glöer & Zettler, 2007 · accepted, alternate representation; Pseudamnicola tramuntanae Altaba, 2007

Species of gastropod

Pseudamnicola beckmanni is a species of small brackish water snail with an operculum, an aquatic gastropod mollusk in the family Hydrobiidae.

== Distribution ==
This species occurs on the Mediterranean island of Mallorca.
