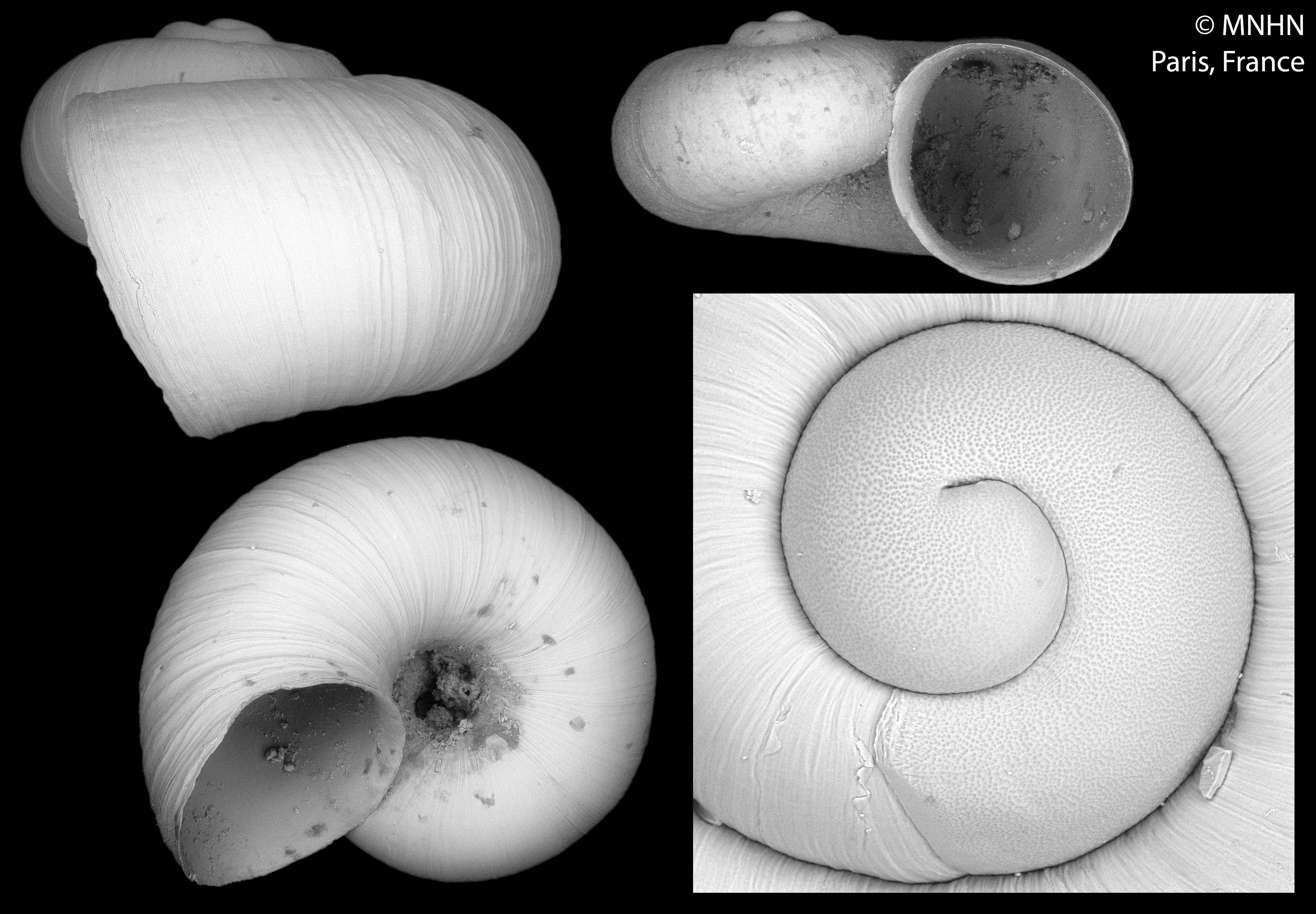
- Shell of Islamia ucetiaensis (paratype at MNHN, Paris)

Scientific classification
- Kingdom: Animalia
- Phylum: Mollusca
- Class: Gastropoda
- Subclass: Caenogastropoda
- Order: Littorinimorpha
- Superfamily: Truncatelloidea
- Family: Hydrobiidae
- Subfamily: Islamiinae
- Genus: Islamia; Radoman, 1973

Type species
- Horatia servaini Bourguignat, 1887

Synonyms
- Adriolitorea Radoman, 1974; Mienisiella Schütt, 1991

= Islamia =

Genus of gastropods

Islamia is a genus of small freshwater snails with a gill and an operculum, aquatic gastropod mollusks in the family Hydrobiidae.

== Species ==
Species within the genus Islamia include:

- Islamia adelmuellerae A. Reischütz, Steiner-Reischütz & P. L. Reischütz, 2018
- † Islamia amiatae Esu & Girotti, 2015
- Islamia anatolica Radoman, 1973
- Islamia archeducis Boeters & Beckmann, 2007
- † Islamia ateni (Boeters, 1969)
- Islamia ayalga Ruiz-Cobo, Alonso, Quiñonero-Salgado & Rolán, 2018
- † Islamia bambolii Esu & Girotti, 2015
- Islamia bendidis Reischütz, 1988
- Islamia bomangiana Boeters & Falkner, 2003
- Islamia bosniaca Radoman, 1973
- Islamia bourguignati (T. Letourneux, 1869)
- Islamia burdurica Yıldırım, Çağlan Kaya, Gürlek & Koca, 2017
- Islamia bunarbasa (Schütt, 1964)
- Islamia cianensis Bodon, Manganelli, Sparacio & Giusti, 1995
- † Islamia corinthica Esu & Girotti, 2015
- Islamia coronadoi (Bourguignat, 1870) (uncertain)
- Islamia dmitroviciana Boeters, Glöer & Pešić, 2013
- Islamia edlingeri (A. Reischütz & P. L. Reischütz, 2004) (uncertain)
- Islamia emanuelei Girardi, 2009
- Islamia epirana (Schütt, 1962)
- Islamia gaillardoti (Germain, 1911)
- Islamia gaiteri Bodon, Manganelli, Sparacio & Giusti, 1995
- Islamia germaini Boeters & Falkner, 2003
- Islamia globulus (Bofill, 1909)
- Islamia graeca Radoman, 1973
- Islamia hadei (Gittenberger, 1982)
- Islamia henrici Arconada & Ramos, 2006
- Islamia karawiyiensis Mabrouki, Glöer & Taybi, 2021
- Islamia lagari (Altimira, 1960)
- Islamia latina Radoman, 1973
- Islamia mienisi (Schütt, 1991)
- Islamia minuta (Draparnaud, 1805)
- Islamia montenegrina Glöer, Grego, Erőss & Fehér, 2015
- Islamia moquiniana (Dupuy, 1851)
- Islamia mylonas Radea, Parmakelis, Demetropoulos & Vardinoyannis, 2017
- Islamia pallida Arconada & Ramos, 2006
- Islamia papavasileioui Glöer & Reuselaars, 2020
- Islamia piristoma Bodon & Cianfanelli, 2002
- Islamia pistrini Ruiz-Cobo, Alonso, Quiñonero-Salgado & Rolán, 2018
- Islamia pseudorientalica Radoman, 1973
- Islamia pusilla (Piersanti, 1951)
- Islamia ruffoi Bodon & Cianfanelli, 2012
- † Islamia sarda Esu, 1984
- Islamia schuelei (Boeters, 1981)
- Islamia selensis Cianfanelli & Bodon, 2017
- Islamia skalaensis Glöer & Reuselaars, 2020
- Islamia spirata (R. Bernasconi, 1985)
- Islamia steffeki Glöer & Grego, 2015
- Islamia tifertiensis Glöer, Mabrouki & Taybi, 2020
- Islamia trichoniana Radoman, 1979
- Islamia ucetiaensis Girardi & Boeters, 2015
- Islamia valvataeformis (Möllendorff, 1873)
- Islamia zermanica Radoman, 1973

Species brought into synonymy

- Islamia azarum (Boeters & Rolán, 1988): synonym of Deganta azarum (Boeters & Rolán, 1988) (new combination)
- Islamia burduricus Yıldırım, Çağlan Kaya, Gürlek & Koca, 2017: synonym of Islamia burdurica Yıldırım, Çağlan Kaya, Gürlek & Koca, 2017 (wrong gender agreement of specific epithet)
- Islamia globulina (Paladilhe, 1866): synonym of Islamia moquiniana (Dupuy, 1851)
