= Islamia trichoniana =

Conservation status
- Critically Endangered (IUCN 3.1)

Scientific classification
- Kingdom: Animalia
- Phylum: Mollusca
- Class: Gastropoda
- Subclass: Caenogastropoda
- Order: Littorinimorpha
- Family: Hydrobiidae
- Genus: Islamia
- Species: I. trichoniana

Binomial name
- Islamia trichoniana Radoman, 1979

Species of gastropod

Islamia trichoniana is a species of small freshwater snail with a gill and an operculum, an aquatic gastropod mollusc or micromollusc in the family Hydrobiidae.

== Geographic distribution ==
I. trichoniana is endemic to Greece, where it is restricted to Lake Trichonida, an ancient, deep, oligotrophic lake in the south Adriatic-Ionian region of the country.

== Conservation status ==
This species is currently classified by the IUCN as critically endangered and possibly extinct. While it was once found throughout Lake Trichonida, it is currently known from only one location on the northeast shore of the lake. It is threatened by habitat destruction, as intensive agricultural practices in the neighbouring area lead to water pollution and eutrophication of the lake and the excessive abstraction of water for irrigation purposes causes a drop in water level.

== See also ==
- List of non-marine molluscs of Greece
