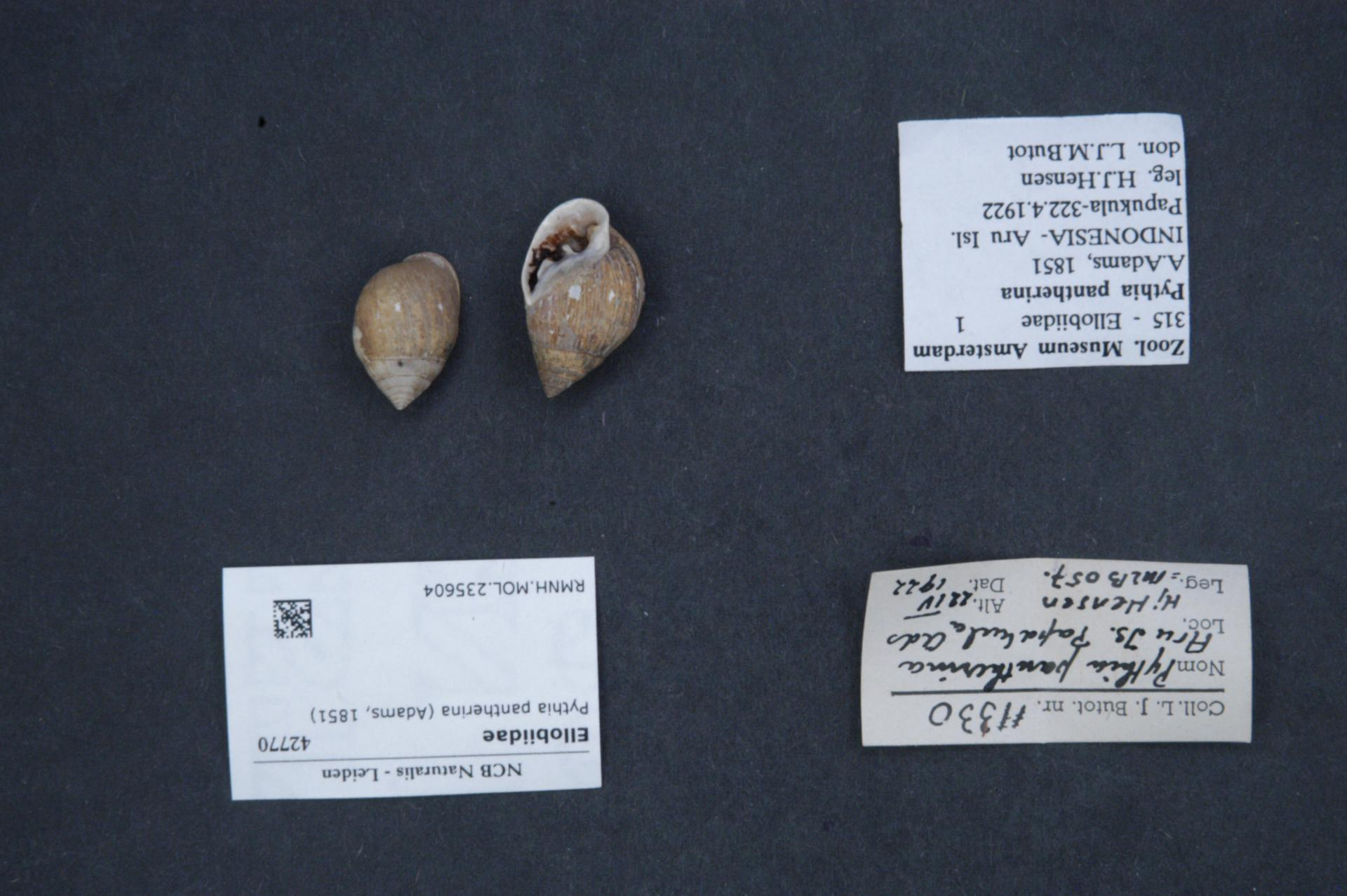
- Pilorcula trifilaris

Scientific classification
- Domain: Eukaryota
- Kingdom: Animalia
- Phylum: Mollusca
- Class: Gastropoda
- Order: Stylommatophora
- Family: Orculidae
- Genus: Pilorcula; Germain, L., 1912

= Pilorcula =

Genus of gastropods

Pilorcula is a genus of air-breathing land snails, terrestrial pulmonate gastropod mollusks in the family Orculidae. The species and subspecies in this genus inhabit the Caucasus and Turkey to Palestine.

== Species and subspecies ==
Species and subspecies within the genus Pilorcula include:

- Pilorcula aspinosa Hausdorf, 1996
- Pilorcula pusilla Hausdorf, 1996
- Pilorcula raymondi (Bourguignat, 1863) -type species
- Pilorcula trifilaris (Mousson, 1856)
- Pilorcula trifilaris anatolica Hausdorf, 1996
- Pilorcula trifilaris longior Hausdorf, 1996
- Pilorcula trifilaris quadrifilaris (Rosen, 1905)
- Pilorcula trifilaris trifilaris (Mousson, 1856)
