= Gyralina hausdorfi =

Conservation status
- Extinct

Scientific classification
- Domain: Eukaryota
- Kingdom: Animalia
- Phylum: Mollusca
- Class: Gastropoda
- Order: Stylommatophora
- Family: Pristilomatidae
- Genus: Gyralina
- Species: †G. hausdorfi

Binomial name
- †Gyralina hausdorfi Riedel, 1990

Extinct species of gastropod

Gyralina hausdorfi is an extinct species of air-breathing land snail, a terrestrial pulmonate gastropod mollusk in the family Pristilomatidae.

Gyralina hausdorfi is considered to be extinct.

== Distribution ==
This species was endemic to Greece.
