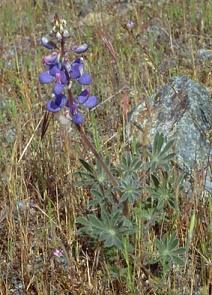

Conservation status
- Imperiled (NatureServe)

Scientific classification
- Kingdom: Plantae
- Clade: Tracheophytes
- Clade: Angiosperms
- Clade: Eudicots
- Clade: Rosids
- Order: Fabales
- Family: Fabaceae
- Subfamily: Faboideae
- Genus: Lupinus
- Species: L. spectabilis

Binomial name
- Lupinus spectabilis Hoover

= Lupinus spectabilis =

Species of legume

Lupinus spectabilis is a species of lupine known by the common name shaggyhair lupine. It is endemic to a section of the central Sierra Nevada foothills in Mariposa and Tuolumne Counties, where it is a member of the serpentine soils flora.

== Description ==
Lupinus spectabilis is a hairy annual herb growing 20 to 60 centimeters tall. Each palmate leaf is made up of usually 9 leaflets measuring 1 to 4 centimeters in length. The inflorescence bears whorls of flowers each just over a centimeter in length. The flower is usually blue with a white patch on its banner, but all-white flowers have been noted. The fruit is a very hairy legume pod up to 5 centimeters long.
