= Pseudamnicola chia =

Conservation status
- Vulnerable (IUCN 3.1)

Scientific classification
- Kingdom: Animalia
- Phylum: Mollusca
- Class: Gastropoda
- Subclass: Caenogastropoda
- Order: Littorinimorpha
- Family: Hydrobiidae
- Genus: Pseudamnicola
- Species: P. chia

Binomial name
- Pseudamnicola chia (E. von Martens, 1889)

Synonyms
- Hydrobia chia E. von Martens, 1889

Species of gastropod

Pseudamnicola chia is a species of very small freshwater snail with an operculum, an aquatic gastropod mollusc in the family Hydrobiidae.

== Geographic distribution ==
P. chia is endemic to Greece, where it is only known from four springs on the island of Chios.
