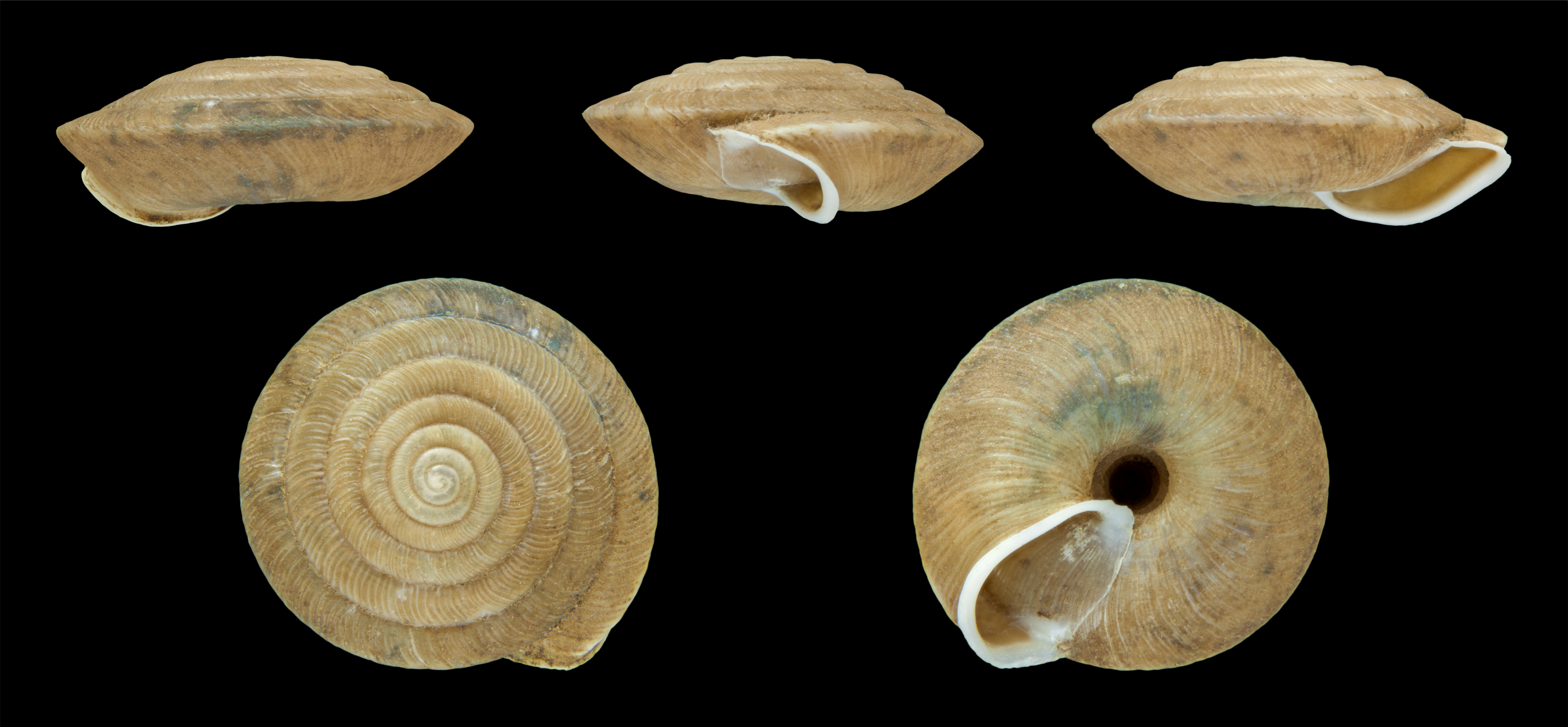
- Five views of a shell of Lindholmiola lens

Conservation status
- Least Concern (IUCN 3.1)

Scientific classification
- Kingdom: Animalia
- Phylum: Mollusca
- Class: Gastropoda
- Order: Stylommatophora
- Family: Helicodontidae
- Genus: Lindholmiola
- Species: L. lens

Binomial name
- Lindholmiola lens (Férussac, 1832)

Synonyms
- Helix (Helicigona) lens Férussac, 1832

= Lindholmiola lens =

Species of gastropod

Lindholmiola lens is a species of air-breathing land snail, a terrestrial pulmonate gastropod mollusc in the family Helicodontidae.

== Distribution ==
This species occurs in Albania, Greece and Turkey.
