= Pseudamnicola exilis =

Conservation status
- Data Deficient (IUCN 3.1)

Scientific classification
- Kingdom: Animalia
- Phylum: Mollusca
- Class: Gastropoda
- Subclass: Caenogastropoda
- Order: Littorinimorpha
- Family: Hydrobiidae
- Genus: Pseudamnicola
- Species: P. exilis

Binomial name
- Pseudamnicola exilis (Frauenfeld, 1863)

Synonyms
- Amnicola exilis Frauenfeld, 1863

Species of gastropod

Pseudamnicola exilis is a species of very small freshwater snail with an operculum, an aquatic gastropod mollusc in the family Hydrobiidae.

== Geographic distribution ==
P. exilis is endemic to Greece.
