= Pseudamnicola macrostoma =

Conservation status
- Data Deficient (IUCN 3.1)

Scientific classification
- Kingdom: Animalia
- Phylum: Mollusca
- Class: Gastropoda
- Subclass: Caenogastropoda
- Order: Littorinimorpha
- Family: Hydrobiidae
- Genus: Pseudamnicola
- Species: P. macrostoma

Binomial name
- Pseudamnicola macrostoma (Küster, 1853)

Synonyms
- Paludina macrostoma Küster, 1853

Species of gastropod

Pseudamnicola macrostoma is a species of very small freshwater snail with an operculum, an aquatic gastropod mollusc in the family Hydrobiidae.

== Subspecies ==
Two subspecies are recognised, the nominotypical P. m. subsp. macrostoma and P. m. subsp. negropontina, the latter being treated as a distinct species (Pseudamnicola negropontina) by some authors.

== Geographic distribution ==
P. macrostoma is endemic to Greece. The species was originally described from a number of springs in the vicinity of Athens but was later also recorded from Evvia as well as several islands in the Aegean and Ionian seas.
