= Pseudamnicola pieperi =

Conservation status
- Vulnerable (IUCN 3.1)

Scientific classification
- Kingdom: Animalia
- Phylum: Mollusca
- Class: Gastropoda
- Subclass: Caenogastropoda
- Order: Littorinimorpha
- Family: Hydrobiidae
- Genus: Pseudamnicola
- Species: P. pieperi

Binomial name
- Pseudamnicola pieperi Schütt, 1980

Species of gastropod

Pseudamnicola pieperi is a species of very small freshwater snail with an operculum, an aquatic gastropod mollusc in the family Hydrobiidae.

== Geographic distribution ==
P. pieperi is endemic to Greece, where it occurs on the island of Carpathos. The species was originally known only from its type locality, a spring near the village of Aperi; however, in 2012 it was found at seven new localities, a fact which might indicate that its conservation status needs to be updated.
