= Pseudamnicola brachia =

Conservation status
- Data Deficient (IUCN 3.1)

Scientific classification
- Kingdom: Animalia
- Phylum: Mollusca
- Class: Gastropoda
- Subclass: Caenogastropoda
- Order: Littorinimorpha
- Family: Hydrobiidae
- Genus: Pseudamnicola
- Species: P. brachia

Binomial name
- Pseudamnicola brachia (Westerlund, 1886)

Species of gastropod

Pseudamnicola brachia is a species of very small freshwater snail with an operculum, an aquatic gastropod mollusc in the family Hydrobiidae.

== Distribution ==
P. brachia is endemic to Greece, where it occurs on the island of Crete.
