= The Paximadia =

Pair of uninhabited islands in Greece

Paximadia
Native name: Παξιμάδια
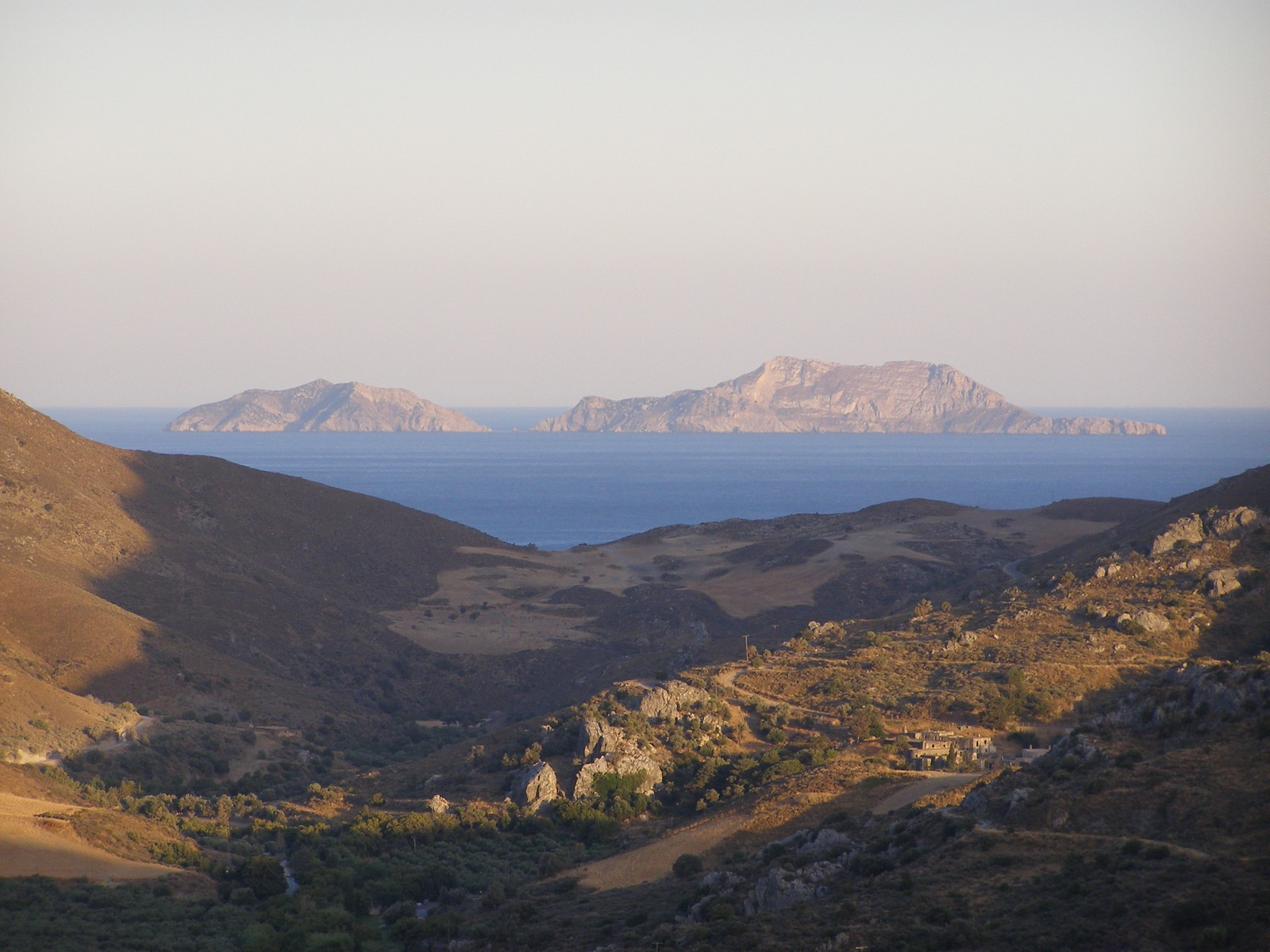
- The Paximadia in the distance with the monastery of Preveli in the foreground

- Location within Greece

Geography
- Coordinates: 35.008°N 24.591°E
- Archipelago: Cretan Islands
- Total islands: 2
- Area: 1.75 km^{2} (0.68 sq mi)

Administration
- Greece
- Region: Crete
- Regional unit: Rethymno

Demographics
- Population: 0

Paximadia (Greek: Παξιμάδια, "rusks") are two small uninhabited islands in the gulf of Mesara located approximately 12 km (7 mi) south of Agia Galini in Rethymno regional unit. They are in the Libyan Sea next to the southern coast of Crete. Due to their proximity to one another, the two islands appear as one from a distance.

== Name ==
Locals often refer to the islands as Elephantaki because it looks like a baby elephant that is lying down, in the water, with its trunk facing west. The name attributed to the islands today is due to their resembling dry Cretan biscuit known as Paximadi (the plural being Paximadia). In ancient Crete they were also known as Dionysioi after the god Dionysus and also as Letoai or Letoa (Ancient Greek: Λητῴα) after the goddess Leto who was worshipped at Phaistos, where she was also known as Fitii in ancient times.

== Mythology ==
In Cretan mythology it is believed that the goddess Leto gave birth to the god Apollo and the goddess Artemis on these islands.

== Beaches ==
There are isolated sand beaches on these islands that can be reached via boat from Aghia Galini.

== Literature ==
The Paximadia islands played a central role in the German novel Der kretische Gast (The Cretan Guest) by Klaus Modick.

== See also ==
- List of islands of Greece
