= Dia (island) =

Greek island

Native name: Δία
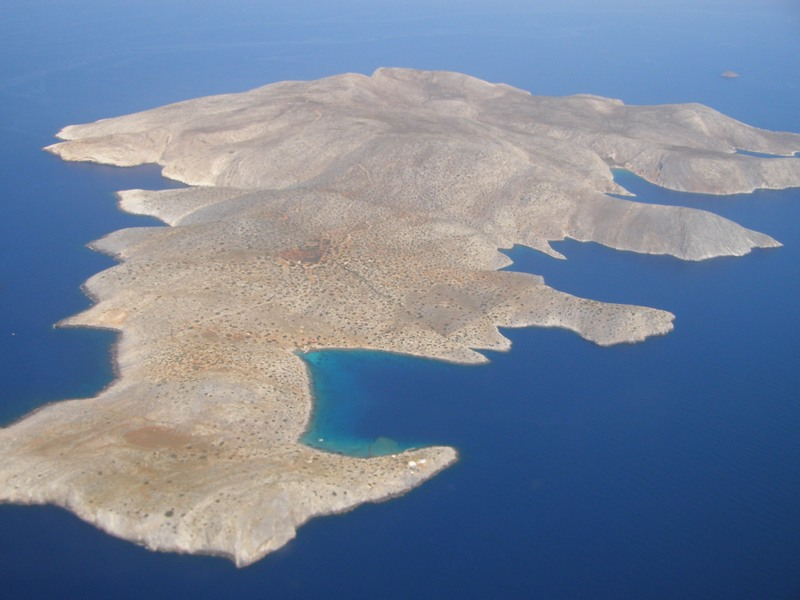
- The island of Dia

- Location within Crete Location within Greece

Geography
- Coordinates: 35.448°N 25.220°E
- Archipelago: Cretan Islands
- Area: 11.909 km^{2} (4.598 sq mi)
- Highest elevation: 220 m (720 ft)

Administration
- Greece
- Region: Crete
- Regional unit: Heraklion

Demographics
- Population: 2 (2001)
- Pop. density: 0/km^{2} (0/sq mi)

Dia (Greek: Δία ['ði.a]), also spelled locally Ntia (Ντία ['di.a]), is an uninhabited island off the northern coast of the Greek island of Crete. The island is 5 km long, 3 km wide and is located approximately 13 km north of Heraklion. Administratively, Dia is part of the community of Elia within the municipal unit of Gouves, Hersonissos municipality in Heraklion.

In the south coast of Dia there are four coves, from west to east Agios Georgios, Kapari, Panagia (Madonna) and Agrielia. One more cove, Aginara, is to the east.

== History ==
The island was formerly known as Standia, by juncture loss in the phrase στήν Δία (Greek for 'on Dia').

It was the principal port of Crete for centuries. Its four south coves have been used as anchorages since the Minoan period.

== Mythology ==
The islet looks like a giant lizard when viewed from the city of Heraklion. Greek mythology tells of a giant lizard that tried to destroy the island of Crete, however, Zeus turned it into stone with a thunderbolt, thus creating the island.

The island is visible from Crete's capital city of Heraklion, as it would have been in the time of the Minoans, from Knossos. Because of this, it was sometimes identified as the island that Theseus escaped to after killing the minotaur.

== Environment ==
On Dia there are a number of protected wildlife species including the snail Albinaria retusa, the lizard Podarcis erchardii schiebeli, a wild subspecies of the European rabbit (Oryctolagus cuniculus cnossius), and Eleonora's falcon, known as mavropetritis in Greek. The island has been recognised as an Important Bird Area (IBA) by BirdLife International because it supports a breeding population of 300–380 pairs of the Eleonora's falcons. Dia is part of the European Network of Nature (Natura 2000) and is a protected hunting ground. There are also a number of protected plants such as Carlina diae.

== Ancient port ==
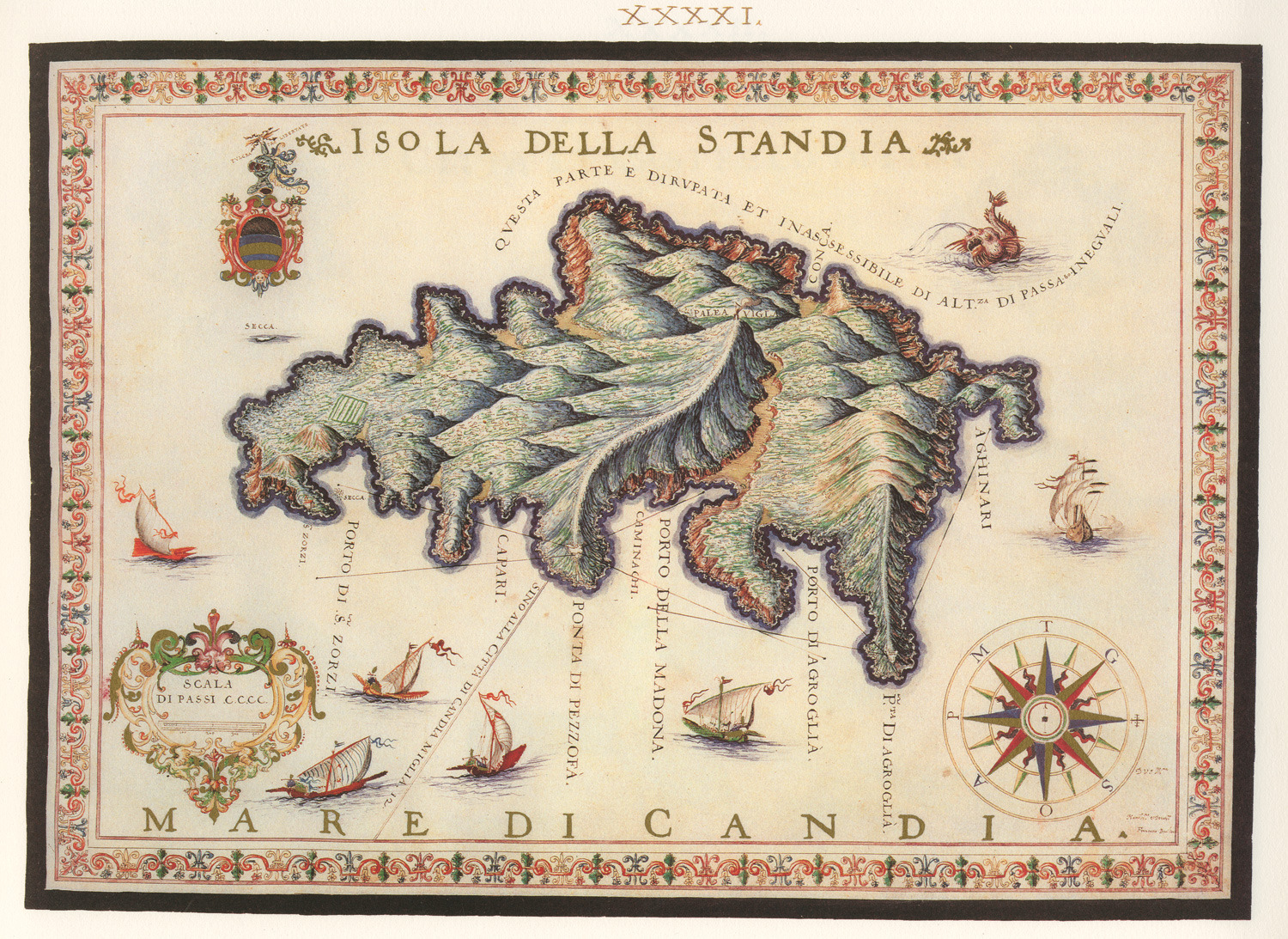
Dia as Standia during late Venetian times, Francesco Basilicata

In 1976, Jacques Cousteau carried out underwater exploration around Dia and found the remains of an ancient port in the waters between Heraklion and Dia.

== Visiting ==
Day trips, but no camping, is allowed to Dia. Swimming, snorkeling and walking along the beach are popular activities. No cars are allowed.

== See also ==
- List of islands of Greece
