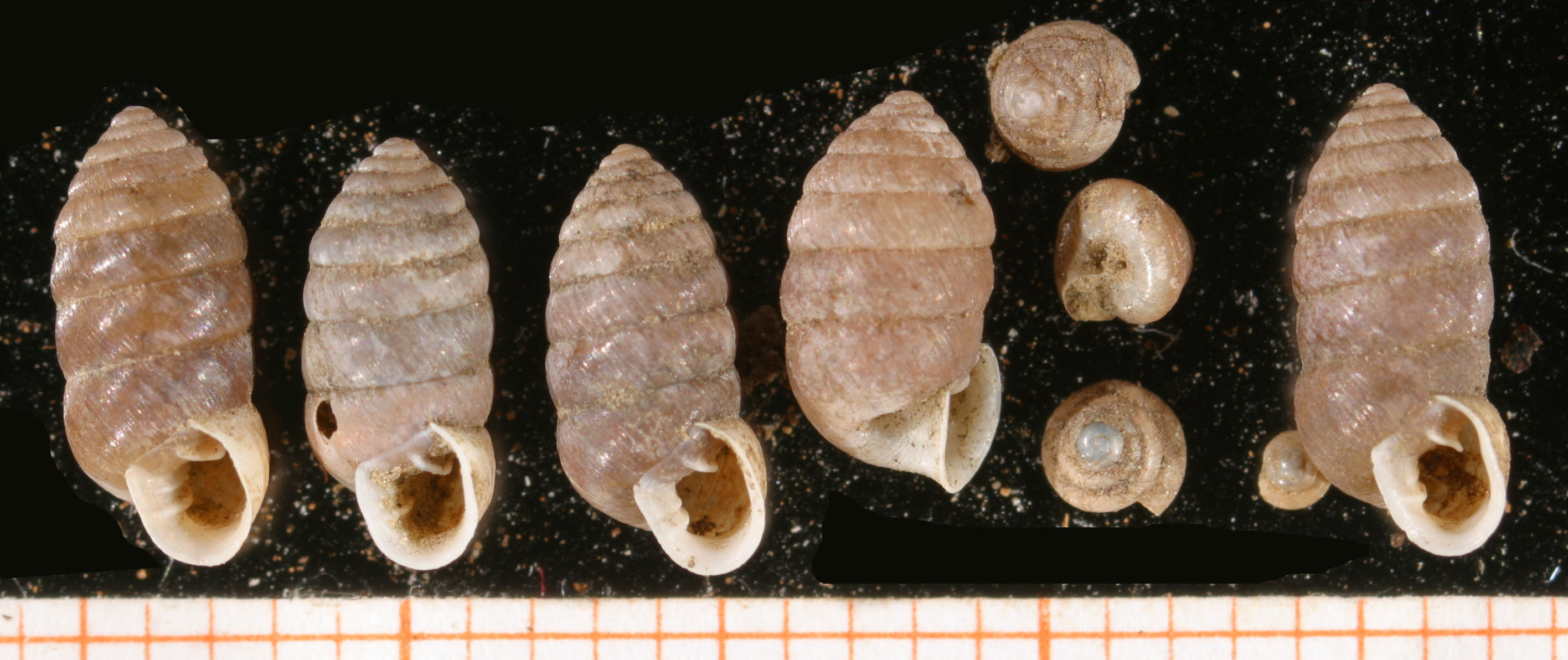
- Orcula dolium

Scientific classification
- Kingdom: Animalia
- Phylum: Mollusca
- Class: Gastropoda
- Order: Stylommatophora
- Suborder: Helicina
- Infraorder: Pupilloidei
- Superfamily: Pupilloidea
- Family: Orculidae; Pilsbry, 1918

= Orculidae =

Family of gastropods

Orculidae is a family of mostly minute, air-breathing, land snails; terrestrial pulmonate gastropod mollusks in the superfamily Pupilloidea.

== Genera ==
Genera within the family Orculidae include:

- Alvariella Hausdorf 1996
- † Nordsieckula Harl & Harzhauser in Harzhauser et al., 2014
- Orcula Held, 1838
- Orculella Steenberger, 1925
- Pilorcula Germain, 1912
- † Pupilorcula Steklov, 1966
- Schileykula Gittenberger, 1983
- Sphyradium Charpentier, 1837

Synonyms

- Mesorculella Schileyko, 1976: synonym of Orculella Steenberg, 1925
- Pupula Mörch, 1852: synonym of Orcula Held, 1838
- Scyphus Cecconi, 1908: synonym of Sphyradium Charpentier, 1837
