= Cape Sideros =

Cape at the northeastern tip of Crete, Greece

Native name: Άκρα Σίδερος Nickname: Cape Mavramouri
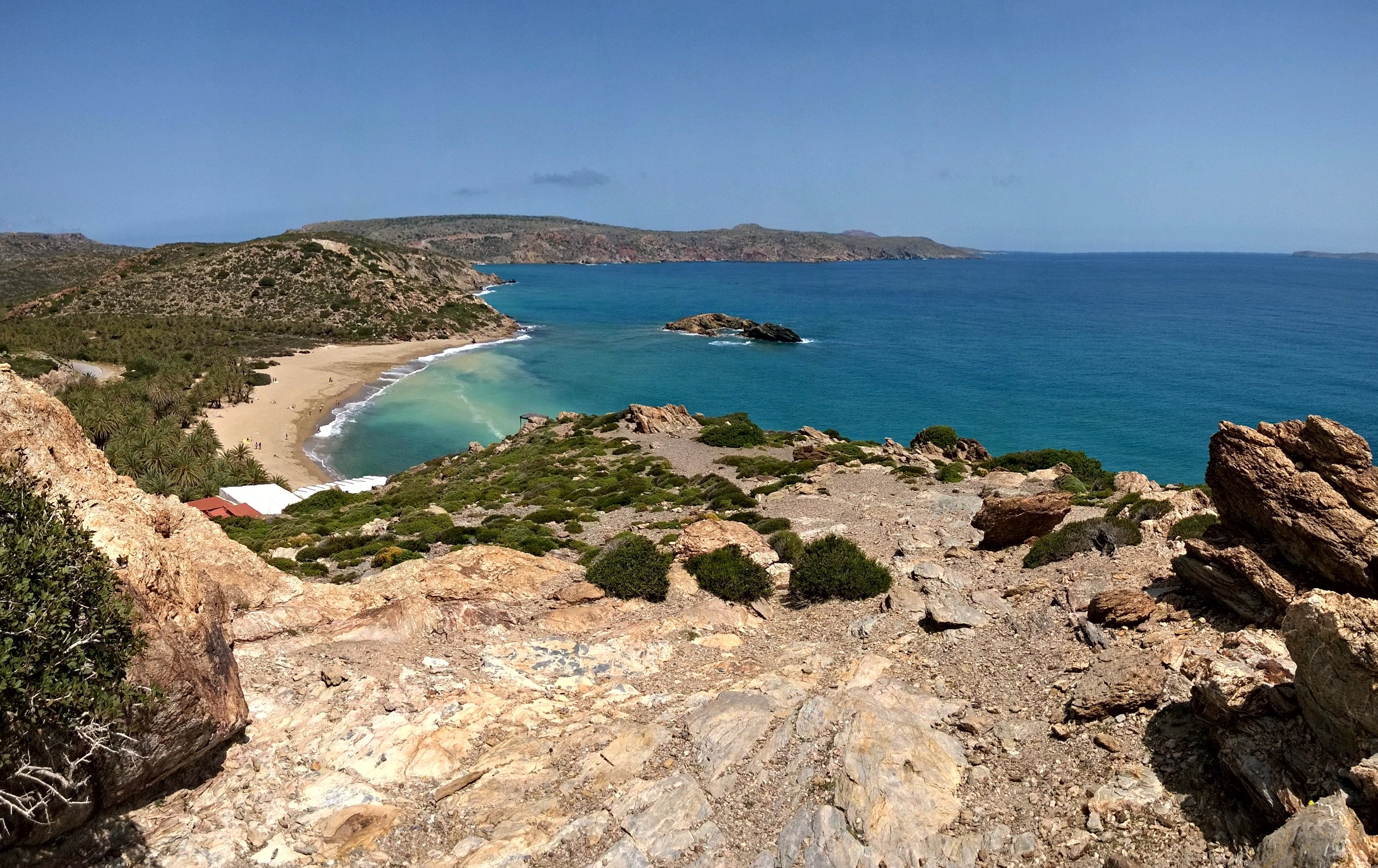
- Vai beach in the center, Cape Sidero in the background. View from the south headland over the beach, eastern Crete.

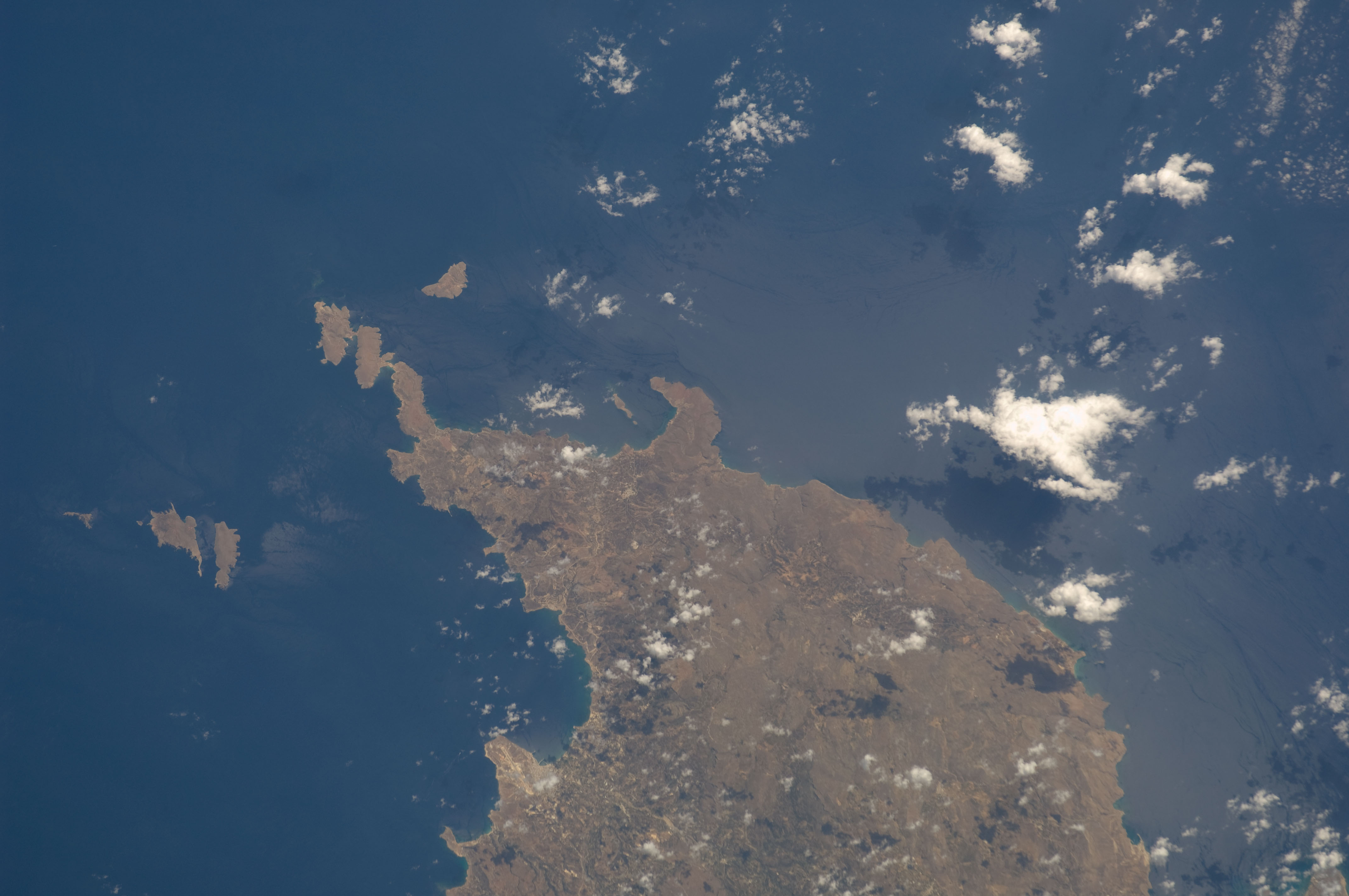
- This N-S alignment of Crete depicts the NE promontory at the top. Left-to-right: Dionysades Islands, Sideros Promontory showing the joined "islands" Sideros (or Mavromouri) and Kyriamadi, the joined Itanos Peninsula, Elasa Island, and Cape Plakas.

- Location of Cape Sidero
- Etymology: Uncertain. Possibly a connection to iron or stars, or to prehistoric words now lost, most likely a Venetian form, San Sidero, of Agios Isidoros, "Saint Isidore," which one uncertain.

Geography
- Location: NE Crete
- Coordinates: 35°18′46″N 26°18′27″E
- Archipelago: Hellenic arc
- Adjacent to: Sea of Crete

Administration
- Greece
- Municipality (2011): Siteia
- Municipal Unit: Itanos

Cape Sideros or Cape Sidero (Greek: Άκρα Σίδερος, romanized: Akra Sideros) is a cape at the eastern end of the island of Crete, Greece. Anciently it was known as Samonium or Samonion (Ancient Greek: Σαμώνιον), Sammonium or Sammonion (Ancient Greek: Σαμμώνιον), Salmonium or Salmonion (Σαλμώνιον) and Salmone (Σαλμώνη). The cape shares the name Sideros or Sidero with the island-like peninsula of which it is a projection, but which had the name first remains unknown, as does the provenance of either name. Cape Sidero is often not confined to the peninsula Sideros, but might refer to the entire northeast promontory.

== Etymology ==
=== Semantic interpretations ===
The meaning of Sidero seems transparent at first glance, as the modern Greek meaning of sidero with a short e is "ferruginous." The ancient Greek word has a long e, but the shortening of the e is no linguistic obstacle to common descent. There is no evidence of the sense. What about the island or the cape is "iron" remains unknown. Iron is not in its mineral structure. There is a second word sidero, "sidereal," but no evidence exists of a connection to stars, either.

Another seemingly transparent connection is that sidero somehow has the same meaning as Samonium. As the latter word has no Greek translation, it would probably be non-Greek. There was substantial ancient Minoan colonization of the promontory. Its ancient and modern name, Itano or Itanos is the same as the name of the Greek city in the area; however, that name appears in Linear B as the name of a Minoan settlement, Utana, which suggests that Sidero and Samonium may not have been Greek either. Assigning the closest word in one language to a word in another is a common theme in the renaming of places by different cultures.

Forbes and Spratt, 19th century travellers over Ottoman Crete, offer the derivation Eis ten Etera > Sitera > Sidero. The starting point is "next to Etera." The latter city is an MSS or other-author variant of Itanos in the anonymous Stadiasmus Maris Magni, an ancient periplus ("sail around," a list of coastal ports, here on the shores of the mare magnum, the Mediterranean) published by Karl Müller in Geographi Graeci Minores. The other variants are Istros or Istron, Istronas or Istrona, Ittone, called by some Arsinoe. At that early date they could only conclude that an unknown city, Etera, lay above Eremoupolis Beach, where Eremoupolis means "deserted city." It was up to the archaeologists to discover later that the hills around the beach for some distance were the site of the sprawling port of Itanos with two acropoleis and two major churches, and that its name at abandonment had been Itanos and not Etera or Istria. Since the city was at its floruit as a Christian city at the time of the Periplus, and there was no room for any other city, one can only conclude that the author of the Periplus was an armchair geographer, like all the rest, without access to eastern Crete, which any ordinary person today can get via GPS and digital photography.

In another speculation, Sidero comes from Isidore, the name of the saint to whom the nearby church is dedicated. The linguistic gap of that derivation is somewhat harder to bridge. If both the cape and the church are named after the same saint and both are the same property, the development of such a difference in names requires an explanation.

The first use of Sidero for the island or the cape remains unknown. Modern dictionaries reflect a consensual belief that Cape Sidero and Cape Samonium always have been one and the same. Some dictionaries, however, report an original issue whether they were the same. Nothing considered predominantly certain remains yet hypothesized.

=== Cartographic development ===
In the original disagreement, the alternative point of view that seemed to present itself to cartographers is that Samonium is what is called today Cape Plaka, although no cartographer apparently had any detailed knowledge of that cape when he designed his map. There was no Cape called Sidero. All cartographers worked from other maps, some having little or no independent information about the country they were mapping. The most influential map-maker of the late Roman Empire was Claudius Ptolemy. He had developed his own coordinate system, the first known surviving. The centuries did not preserve early maps, however, perhaps because they were in such demand. All of Ptolemy's maps were lost, but his reputation persisted. His Geography survived as a gazeteer of places with coordinates. It could not be used today, of course, as its distortions are numerous and great.

At the start of the Age of Exploration, the explorers, having not yet explored, and having no comprehensive maps, turned to the maps of their ancestors. The cartographers were happy to oblige with reconstructions. The issue of Cape Sidero comes from alternative reconstructions of Ptolemy. As these became more and more realistic, Ptolemy eventually went by the board.

Ptolemy's 10th map of Europe and gazetteer of east Crete (he says east, as opposed to north and south) lists six named places: 1) Sammonium promontory, 2) Minoa harbor, 3) Camara town, 4) Olus, 5) Chersonesus, and 6) Zephyrium promontory. Being eastern Crete, they should trend N-S, but Ptolemy has them trending E-W, beginning with Sammonium.(Expand the Germanus map below.) The line fits the northeast promontory fairly well except for Minoa harbor, which by the coordinates dives to the south, so to speak. Germanus had Itanos there. Otherwise Sammonium fits Sidero and Zephyrium fits Cape Agiou Nikolaou, with the others between, except for Chersonesus. The latter always means peninsula, but Germanus omits it from the map. Sitia appears as Itea. The Dionysades are missing.

A century later the case of the missing Chersonesus has apparently been solved by a second interpretation, presented by the map of Abraham Ortelius (Expand the map below). Politics had moved on since Germanus. Itanos is gone without a trace. The Venetian Empire, masters of Crete, had engaged in a new struggle with the Ottoman Empire over possession of the Aegean, one which they would lose. Unable to protect Itanos, the Venetians moved its population to Sitia and abandoned it. Sitia became the capital of a new east Crete, Sittiae territorium, the first land basis of the Municipality of Sitia, although somewhat larger. Ortelius shows a wasp-like Crete, with the east-Crete segment thin-waisted west of Sitia, much beyond what it is. This is the new Venetian east Crete.

All of Ptolemy's names have been dispensed with, but a new peninsula has appeared. Salamoni is associated with Cape Plaka. Grandes Island appears as Grades, a peninsula of a peninsula on Plaka. The second peninsula, where Germanus had one, is C. S. Sidero (Capo San Sidero), a Venetian name. At its base is Mauromury. Elasa is there as well as the Dionysades, a much more accurate map, but one in which Sammonium has been robbed of its true location, which now bears a name not previously known, a Venetian name.

In another nearly 100 years the renowned "King's Geographer" of France, Nicolas Sanson, publishes his Ptolemaic map, which keeps all the distortions of the previous, but re-inserts Ptolemaic names in a sort of cartographic fantasy. Sidero is gone now, replaced by Germanicus' pointed Samonium, but the latter name is now associated with Cape PLaka. Instead Sanson calls the promontory Itanum. Itanos the city is back, though it lies nearly invisible under the surface of the hills above Itano Beach. Grades does not yet have island status. Zephyrium Promontory is back, but is nowhere near Sitia, now Cytaeum. Instead Minoa fills the bill. Chersonesus is stuffed next to Zephyrium, but only as an island. Etc., etc.

These Ptolemaic maps are not of much practical use, but are for ornament and show, especially the Germanus maps, with their striking turquoise waters and colored land features with grids of coordinates. The ship captains did not use them, but used instead the Portolan charts. The essential information on these charts was distance and bearing from any known point to a charted location. As a vessel never knew exactly where it was for certain, it could not calculate bearing and distance as it went along but had to follow a standard bearing given by the Portolan and hope to arrive at the marked destination. The HMS Bounty mutineers used this method to locate Pitcairn Island. They knew the island's latitude but not the longitude, so they steered along the latitude until they found it.

Rhumb lines went over the vast plains of Asia as well. Not for nothing was the camel called "the ship of the desert."

As the navigator was always looking along rhumb lines, the arrangement of lettering and direction was made conformable. In Ptolemaic maps north is usually on top. In a portolan the landscape and lettering might be presented in any orientation, which makes it hard to read in a book. One might suppose the portolan was pegged to a table around which the navigator could move at will.

Portolans begin in the 14th century, much preceding the Ptolemaics. Typically they were continental in scope to present the full extent of the rhumb lines. Thus there was little room for lettering. Abbreviations were used frequently. Candia (Crete) is always displayed in charts including the Mediterranean. The eastern cape is always shown and is always labeled C. or Cauo Sal., Salmo, Sam. or such, even centuries after the Ptolemaic maps had Sidero. By implication, Sidero was Venetian in origin, which explains why it is so different from Greek Isidore.

=== The Greeks and Venetian names ===
The Republic of Venice (about 1000 - 1797) involved itself in Cretan affairs when it purchased Crete from Boniface I, Marquis of Montferrat, who had been awarded it as his share of the spoils from the Fourth Crusade, which sacked Constantinople in 1204. The crusaders little suspected the consequences of destroying the power and authority of the Eastern Roman Empire, also known as the Byzantine Empire. For now it recovered as a rump state with no effective forces.

The sale had a catch to it. All the Venetians had to do is clear out the Genoese who had taken possession, which they did in 1205 - 1212, establishing the Kingdom of Candia. The Orthodox Greek population were joined by Roman Catholic Venetian colonists, whom they resented. Eventually they united for the Revolt of Saint Titus against a Venetian government that was so bad as to provoke even its own colonists to revolt. When the insurgency began to negotiate with the Genoese for a change in masters, the Venetians suppressed them in 1364, save for a remnant that fought on in the mountains under the flag of a Constantinople unable to do much of anything else. Acquiring the absolution of the Pope and with the assistance of Turkish troops The Venetians quelled the last of the rebellion in 1368, banishing the rebellious families from Crete.

However, a new contender had come into the geopolitical arena. The Ottoman Empire began under Osman I, a successful bey of the Kayi tribe, who been able to unite the Oghuz Turks gradually infiltrating into Anatolia from the northeast. Rule of the beylik (the sultanship) descended to Mehmed the Conqueror in 1444, then a teen-ager (a striking parallel to Alexander the Great). Subsequently, in 1449 Constantine XI Palaiologos became Roman Emperor, the last, as it turns out.

In the last of the Byzantine-Ottoman wars, the 21-year-old Mehmed sieged Constantinople, taking it in 1453, ending the Roman Empire. They had gone to war over possession of the Peloponnese. The weakened Constantinople had had only one chance: if the crusaders came back to defend it. France, Britain and Germany were involved in religious wars. The pope was insisting on Catholicism as the price of his help. The Ottomans outnumbered the Byzantines 10 to 1 and had cannon. The Venetian and Genoese mercenaries beat a hasty retreat. Constantine died leading an infantry charge at the palace, but it is said an angel turned him to marble and hid him beneath the city awaiting God's signal to rise and fight again. The victorious Ottomans conducted massacres of the Christians, an object lesson not lost in Venice.

== Geography ==
The entire Itano promontory culminating in Cape Sidero includes various features of national interest.

=== Cape Sidero light ===
Cape Sidero, being at the tip of Crete, is adjacent to a strategic maritime crossroads. Traffic passing through the sea of Crete along the inside of the Hellenic Arc intersects the paths of traffic entering or leaving the Aegean Sea. The cape is a good observation and access point for these roads. At the same time, the coast is dangerous for ships, abounding in reefs and shallows.

Accordingly, in 1880 The French Company of Lighthouses acting under contract with the Ottoman Empire (then possessed of Crete) built and maintained in their network of lighthouses a light on Cape Sidero, to a height of 15 m (49 ft), featuring the Fresnel lens. It has been in operation since then, except for a period of ruin and abandonment 1941-1948 under German occupation and in the Greek Civil War.

Rebuilt in 1948 the light house is the responsibility of the Hellenic Navy Hydrographic Service. Currently it is on the grounds of a small naval station, Naval Station of Kyriamadi, comprising a building and harbor, and usually is off limits to the public. It is also near the church of Agios Isidoros. For a few days a year in February during the festival of the saint the Greek Navy opens the lighthouse to the public.

Lighthouses are identified by ships at sea at night by a characteristic pattern of light emissions, which are recorded in a book carried by every ship. Once it is identified and its position is read on the chart, a few bearings on the light tells the navigator exactly where the ship is; however, modern-day use of GPS may make this older procedure unnecessary. In any case the Cape Sidero light emits one flash of white light every 10 seconds.

== Geology ==
Crete being a visible platform of the predominantly submarine range termed geologically the Hellenic Arc, the northeast promontory is a ridge that declines into the Sea of Crete and continues as a spur ridge to a second, volcanic arc, the peaks of which form the Dodecanese Archipelago. The Hellenic Arc itself continues eastward south of the northeast promontory underwater to Karpathos and Rhodes, where the arc is considered to end.

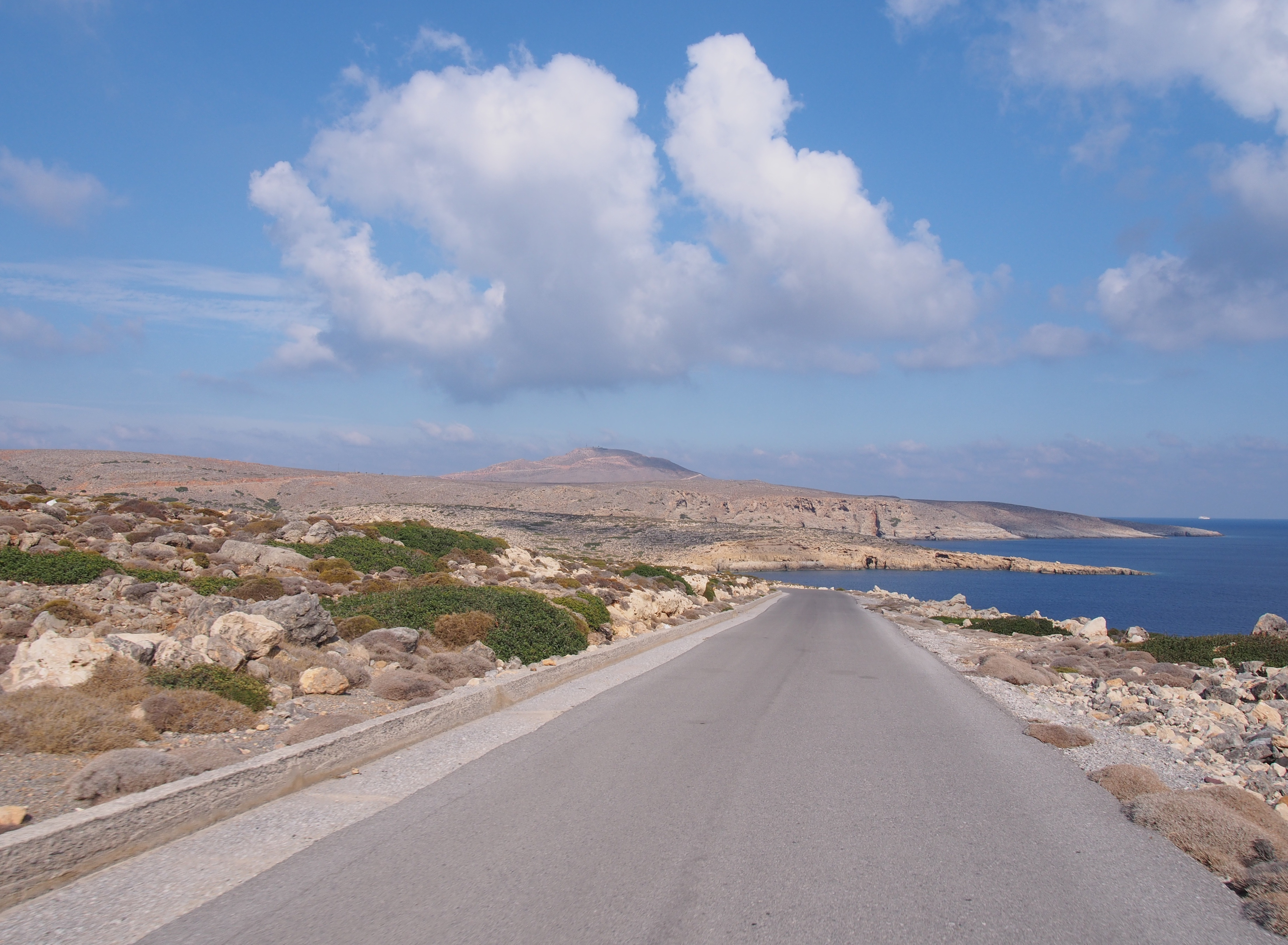
Cape Sidero from the road along Itanos. Both Sideros and Kyriamadi are clearly visible.

The promontory of which Cape Sidero is the visible terminus is composed of a narrowing ridge and two island-like prominences, Sideros and Kyriamadi "Islands," which are not really islands, but are connected to each other and to the ridge by narrow cols. The submarine ridge beyond Sideros trends sharply to the south to be a submarine col to Elasa Island before trending to the northeast again.

To the south the col between Crete and the next island to the east, Kasos, is the sill for the Strait of Kasos between the Sea of Crete and the Eastern Mediterranean, one of five such: the east Cretan straits, Kasos 65 km (40 mi) wide, 1,000 m (3,300 ft) deep, Karpathos 40 km (25 mi) wide, 850 m (2,790 ft) deep, Rhodes 15 km (9.3 mi) wide, 700 m (2,300 ft) deep; the west Cretan straits, Kythira 35 km (22 mi) wide, 160 m (520 ft) deep, and Elaphonisus 10 km (6.2 mi) wide, 180 m (590 ft) deep.

South of Crete is the Hellenic Trench, between 2,000 m (6,600 ft) and 4,000 m (13,000 ft) deep. North of eastern Crete are the two main deeps of the Sea of Crete, about 2,200 m (7,200 ft) and 2,500 m (8,200 ft) deep. They border the Cycladic Plateau of about 250 m (820 ft) maximum depth. Some consider the Sea of Crete to be the southern Aegean Sea.

In historical geology the eastern Mediterranean submarine topography is the result of two main crustal movements: the collision of the African Plate in its northward drifting with the Eurasian Plate in the vicinity of northern Greece, uplifting the Hellenic arc on the north side of the Hellenic Trench, and the subsequent rotational back-arc extension pushing the arc southward and rotating it CW thinning the crust north of it into a sea (Aegean) in which volcanoes have broken through the thinned crust (Cyclades). The net movement of the arc, which one might expect to be northward, due to the motion of Africa, is consequently toward Africa, opening up the Sea of Crete. Some in fact believe the Hellenic Trench is only a legacy remnant of an ancient subduction.

== Hydrology ==
The Mediterranean, a remnant of Tethys Sea between Eurasia and Gondwana, for most of the 20th century was regarded as a sink. Water was observed to flow in over the Gibraltar sill and from the Black Sea and rivers, but none ever seemed to exit, leading hydrologists to suppose that the evaporation rate was so high as to create a sink.

The trend of current research suggests a more complex "thermohaline" flow. Water responds gravitationally to density, according ultimately to Archimedes' Principle, that a floating object displaces its own weight. Bundles of water of the same density are floating objects also, which can sink or rise depending on their weight. Lower temperature ("thermo-") or higher concentrations of mineral salts ("-haline") cause the density of liquid water to rise (not so for ice) and the water to sink, creating currents. As surface sea water evaporates, the surface water must gain in density and sink. Thus there are two patterns of currents, surface and subsurface. 20th century observation noted only the surface currents. Below the surface the flow is quite different. Beneath the inflow of warmer, lighter water over the Gibraltar sill is an outflow of cooler, more saline water into the Atlantic. Similarly the Sea of Crete receiving Atlantic surface water through the straits turns it into a subsurface reservoir of cool, dense water, rich in nutrients, which feeds the eastern Mediterranean and is much loved by deep-water species, such as the giant squid, and diving Cetaceans, such as the sperm whale. The Mediterranean is not a sink, it is a source of deep, nutritious water, hence the presence of deep-water species around Cape Sidero.

The coast of Crete is a totally different habitat. One might expect drop-offs sounding to great depths, but that is seldom the case. Crete is surrounded by a coastal shelf in which reefs and shallows abound; i.e., close inshore the waters are dangerous, and this especially true of eastern Crete. The waters of the strait do not break directly on the shoreline; there are always bays to consider; albeit most have beaches of fine sand well-frequented by the population. In the days of sail they were traps to ground or snag sailing vessels expecting a continuation of deep waters. Harbors navigable to ocean-going ships were only to be found at a few locations, where larger cities with ports came into existence and persisted. There was nowhere else to go, so to speak.

Ákra Síderos

Climate chart (precipitation, max. and min. temperature)
J	F	M	A	M	J	J	A	S	O	N	D
108 14 12	80 13 11	31 15 12	19 17 14	18 22 17	4 24 20	1 28 23	1 29 25	17 27 23	30 22 19	50 20 18	122 16 14
- █ Average max. and min. temperatures in °C
- █ Precipitation totals in mm
Imperial conversion
J	F	M	A	M	J	J	A	S	O	N	D
4.3 57 54	3.1 55 52	1.2 59 54	0.7 63 57	0.7 72 63	0.2 75 68	0 82 73	0 84 77	0.7 81 73	1.2 72 66	2 68 64	4.8 61 57
- █ Average max. and min. temperatures in °F
- █ Precipitation totals in inches

== Climate of the promontory ==
The climate in the area is temperate, average annual temperature 19 °C (66 °F). The warmest month is August, when the average temperature is 27 °C (81 °F), and the coldest is February, with 12 °C (54 °F). Average annual rainfall is 481 mm (18.9 in) The wettest month is December, with an average of 122 mm (4.8 in), and the driest is July, with 1 mm (0.039 in).

== Ecology ==
Due to its unspoiled character and a wealth of natural and historical assets, northeast Crete in modern times has been a target for developers, who wish to build hotels, residences, and recreational centers such as golf courses. As this development would totally alter the content of its ecology, and destroy the historical sites, a number of protective agencies, foreign and domestic, have taken an interest in eastern Crete in general, the Itanos promontory with Cape Sidero in particular. This interest, supported by the government, has resulted in the establishment of a number of overlapping reservations, or parks, each aimed at a specific aspect of conservation.

=== Sitia Geopark ===
The Sitia UNESCO Global Geopark (also called Sitia Nature Park in translation) was formed in 2015. It occupies the Itano promontory from an irregular SE trending line between Kalavros on the north coast and Livari on the south coast eastward to the middle of Kyriamadi, but excluding the Island of Sidero entirely. Apparently the park ends where military jurisdiction begins; after all, the best governmental agency to manage a naval base is the Navy. There is some confusion about the location of the park on some of the maps shown on the Internet. One might see the label "Kyriamadi Nature Park" on Sideros; however, there is no such park unless "Kyriamadi" is to be interpreted as "that part of Sitia geopark located on Kyriamadi." The appearance of the label on Sideros is a confusion. Similarly, the Kyriamadi naval station is mainly on Sideros but takes its name from the Bay of Kyriamadi between them.

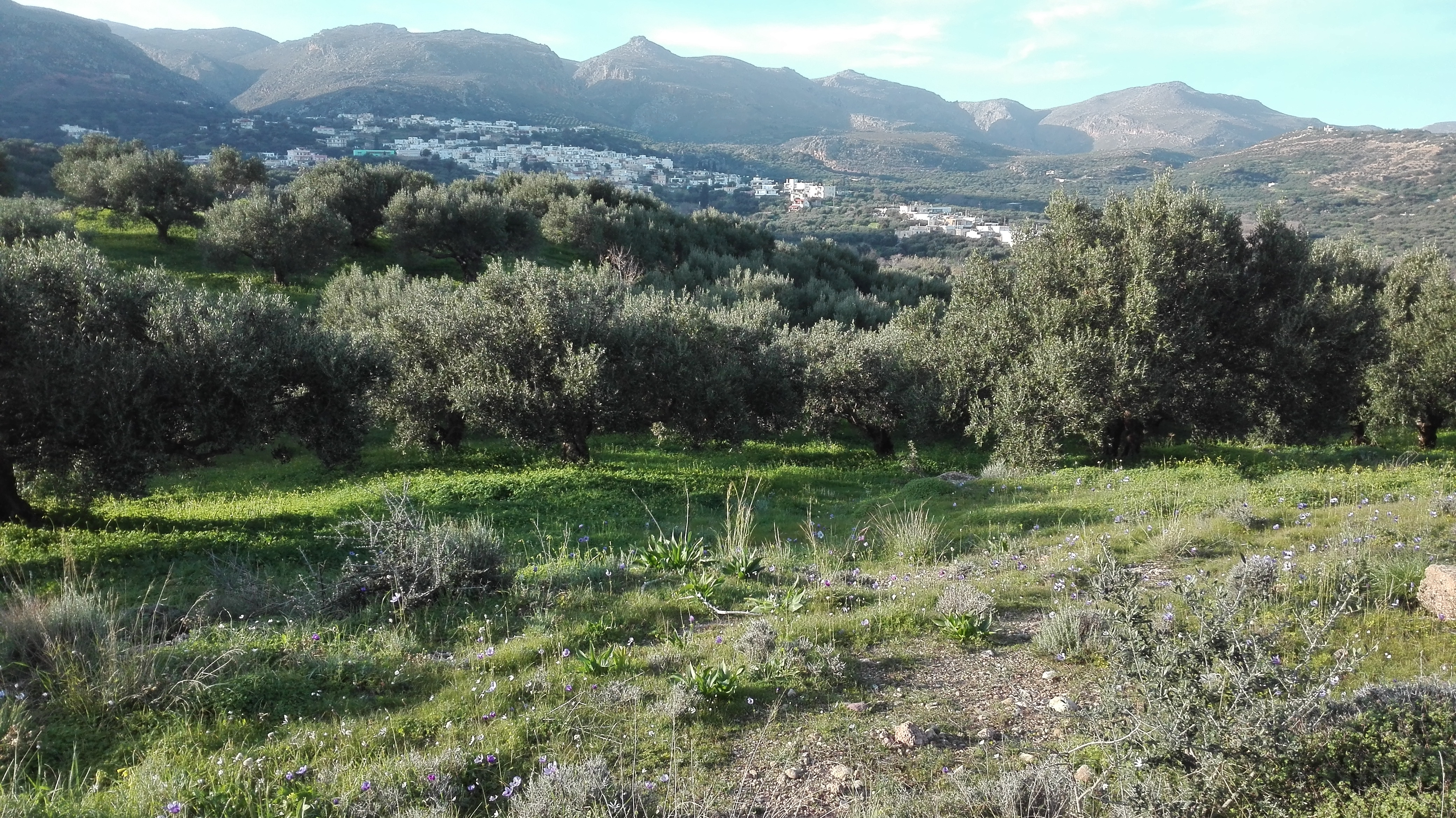
The town of Zakros in the region called epano Zakros, "upper Zakros" seen from the southeast, the vicinity of the Zakros Gorge parking lot. The highest part of the Zakros range, the easternmost range of Crete, is seen above the town. Sitia is in a straight line from the observer to the town over the hills.

The park captures the low, sedimentary, limestone Zakros Mountains. Its major geologic features are approximately 170 caves and gorges hosting rare, endangered, and endemic species. The rocks are fossiliferous. The places of interest are connected by a network of posted trails. They cover most of the Municipality of Sitia. Its government manages the park. The park is presented by the Natural History Museum of Zakro and the Spelological Center of Kaydi.

The brush cover of the mountains is stands and thickets of Mediterranean aromatic shrubs, such as thorny burnet, thyme, broom, winter savory, heather, rock rose, etc. The ground tends to be dry. The canyons, on the other hand, contain enough moisture to support a maquis of kermes oak, Oriental plane, Carob and other trees. A variety of flowering species line the canyon walls, many rare and endemic. These places are a natural herbarium for botanical research.

Birds dominate the fauna. The larger cape is on a flyway between Europe and Africa. The cape and the coast with its isolated rocky spaces, wetlands, and beaches, stuck out in the middle of an oceanic flyway, attract dozens of species of migratory birds in large numbers. In addition the gorges offer hidden nesting places for indigenous birds. Birds are so prolific and diverse as to support a population of raptors, such as Eleonora's falcon, the peregrine falcon, and the golden eagle. Other fauna are dolphins, the Monk Seal, bats, martens, badgers, mice, lizards and non-poisonous snakes.

Before becoming a park the region was populated by a distribution of small villages. These were left in place, the architecture considered to be of historic value. Also over the countryside are the archaeological sites.

=== Natura 2000 protected area ===
The nationalism of the 19th century had ended in universal war between alliances of nations that were unable to otherwise solve disagreements between themselves. The 20th century saw the rise of the idea of communities of nations that would act in concert to address problems before they descended to war or if war should arise anyway to become a decisive force to settle them. The first such responsible community was the United Nations. When it was not going to war, or settling or preventing war, it also took responsibility for encouraging and assisting its member states by addressing the problems of peace common to all, hence the formation of UNESCO. It assisted many new developing nations into existence and into the community.

Later in the century a second responsible community of nations was formed for the benefit of European nations competing against and threatened by the apparently massive bloc of the Soviet Union, against which the United Nations had been relatively ineffective in a long stand-off termed the Cold War. This stand-off had come perilously close to a third universal conflict. The new community, in existence as such by 1993, was termed the European Union (EU). Around the time of its formation the Soviet Union disintegrated into individual states, unable to support the cost of its empire. The countries of east Europe were free to join the EU.

The EU's problems have been those of peace: growing and migrating populations, overdevelopment, pollution of the terrain, allocation of natural resources, such as water. Its response has been similar to that of the UN. It encourages nations to create and manage protected areas where the terrain and resources are defended against development. The entire system of these areas follows a standard model and is termed the Natura 2000 network. This network came into existence from precedent components in 1993 along with the EU. The network for a participant country was to be superimposed over its existing national park and geopark structure. As the ultimate responsibility of managing all these types of parks lay with the member nations, they were all placed under the jurisdiction of regional "management units," which combined national park, geopark, and Natura 2000 protection area as seemed most convenient.

Natura 2000 areas are defined in a specific way. Acting under specific legislation enacted in support of their candidacy for the EU; that is, the Birds Directive and the Habitats Directive, prospective member nations partner with the European Commission of the EU to determine what areas need to be protected. Once they have been determined the new member country devises a management plan for them.

In Crete Cape Sidero and the entire northeast promontory have been designated a protected area, ID GR4320006, with a long name transliterated from the Greek in Roman script:

Voreioanatoliko Akro Kritis: Dionysades, Elasa Kai Chersonisos Sidero (Akra Mavro Mouri - Vai - Akra Plakas) Kai Thalassia Zoni

The name begins by specifying "northeast cape of Crete:" and then enumerates what is to be included: the "Dionysades," a northward-trending archipelago north of the promontory, "Elasa," an island directly to the east of Cape Sidero, and the "Sidero Promontory," consisting of "Point Mavromouri," "Vai," and "Cape Plaka," the last two of which are on the east side of the promontory, and "coastal zones." Mavromouri is not generally used, but it must be the local name for the point itself, as Sidero in this context embraces the entire promontory. The meaning of mavromouri is questionable. The closest meaning in Greek is "black-face," except that the phrase in other Mediterranean languages is "Moor's head," a mediaeval heraldic symbol of Christian faith. However, some recast the Natura 2000 place name as meaning "black hill."

Two subsequent overlapping areas were defined. GR4320009, Voreioanatoliko Akro Kritis, "Northeast promontory of Crete," covers Cape Sidero, the coastal zones, but not the interior of the promontory, Elasa and Grandes Islands, but not the Dionysades. GR4320011, Dionysades Nisoi, covers only the Dionysades. A recent Natura 2000 document explains that GR4320006 protects the fossils, the archaeological material dating back to the Neolithic, and the endemic plant species. GR4320009 protects the birds, especially the migrating ones, which are usually found in coastal regions. GR4320011 protects the birds and the endemic plants of the islands.

== History ==
=== The cape in historical antiquity ===
The cape is noted by many ancient secular writers including Strabo, Ptolemy, Pomponius Mela, and Pliny the Elder, and in the anonymous Stadiasmus Maris Magni. Just off the promontory, ancient geographers described a reef island called Naulochus or Naumachos. The reef island of Elasa and its surrounding rocky islets fit this description.

It was at Samonion that the crew of the Alexandrian ship, which was conveying Paul the Apostle to Rome, changed course to pursue their voyage under the lee of Crete because of contrary winds.

== Maps ==
Map by Nicolaus Germanus, first major Ptolemaic cartographer of the Age of Exploration, dating from the 1460s.
Map of Abraham Ortelius, 1584.
Map by Nicolas Sanson, "King's Geographer" (Louis XIII, France), 1651.

== Reference Bibliography ==
- NHMC (2015). Nature sculpted by time: Natura 2000 Protected Areas of Crete (PDF) (in Greek and English). Heraklion: Region of Crete and European Union. ISBN 978-960-89005-8-5.
