= Sideros =

Island-like peninsula at the end of Cape Sidero, Crete, Greece

Native name: Σίδερος
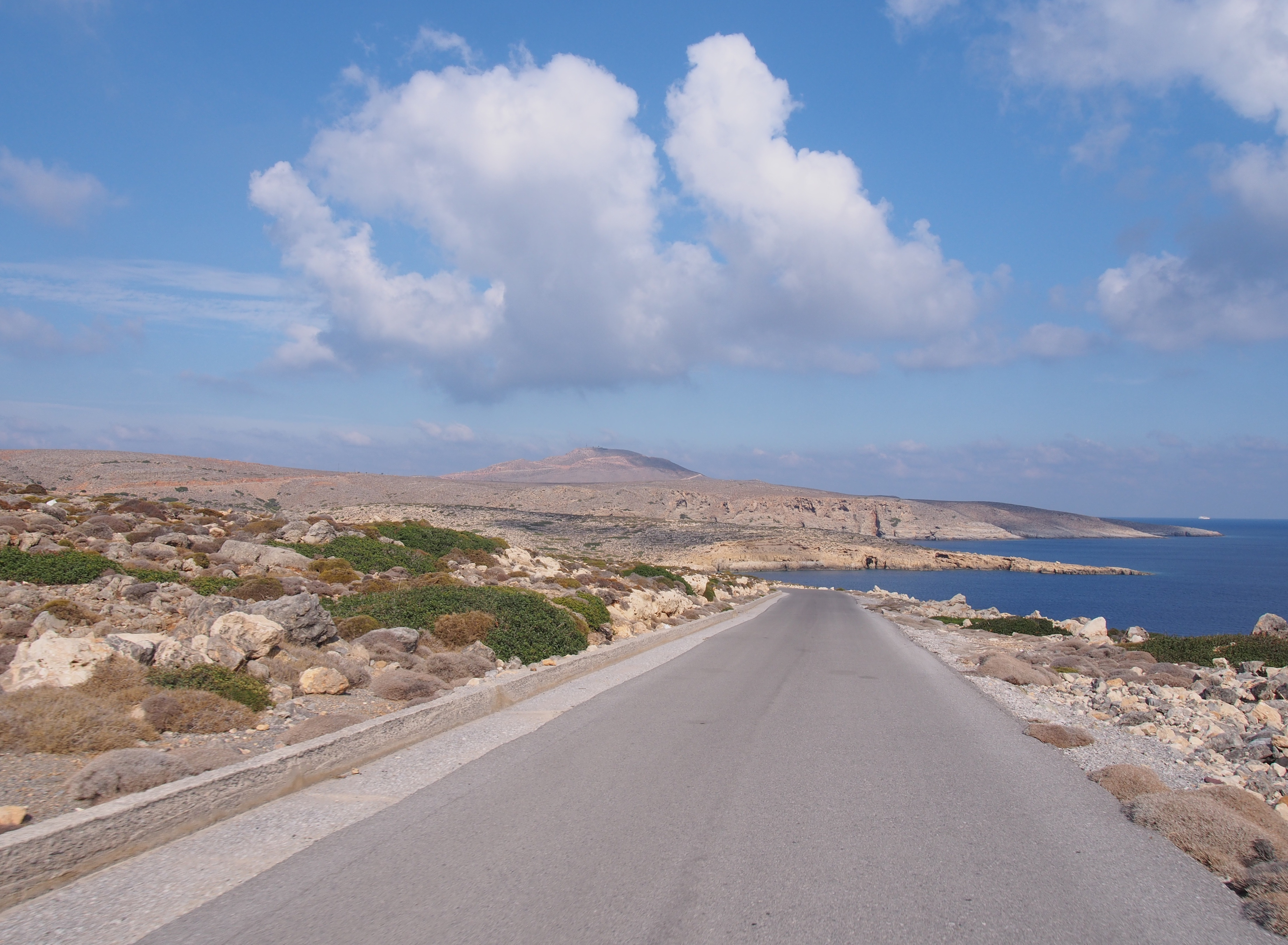
- View from the northeast side of Kyriamadi. The central elevation of Sideros is visible in the background.

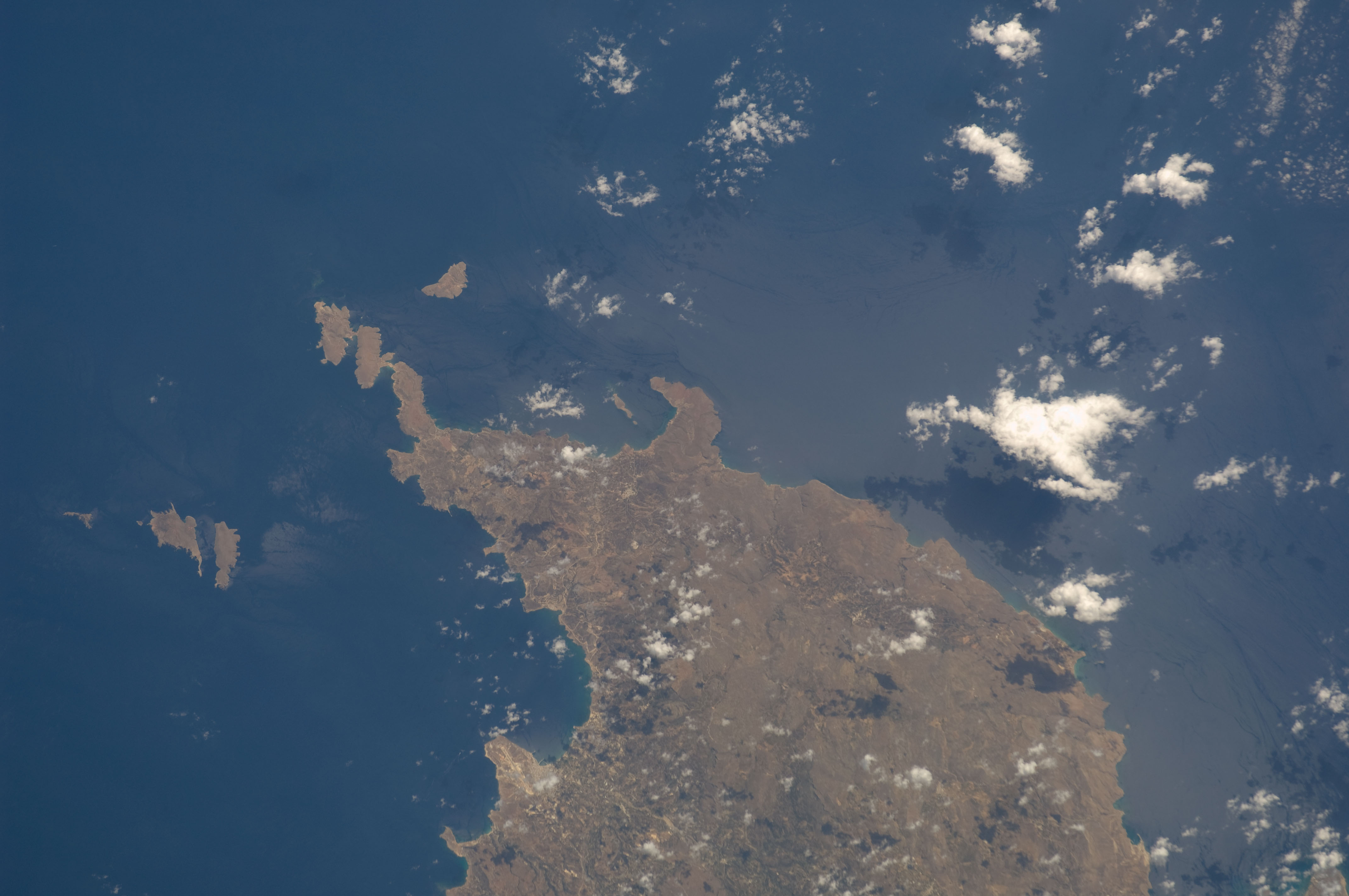

- Location within Crete
- Etymology: According to the early maps, the cape was renamed by the Venetians after San Sidero, the Venetian "Saint Isidore," as a symbol of militant Christianity in the long contention between Crusader nations and the early Ottoman Empire.

Geography
- Coordinates: 35°18′46″N 26°18′27″E
- Archipelago: Cretan Islands

Administration
- Greece
- Region: Crete
- Regional unit: Lasithi

Sideros (Greek: Σίδερος), is the outermost of a chain of two island-like peninsulas forming, with Itanos promontory, Cape Sidero. They are all three the summits of submarine elevations connected by rocky surface cols on which a road has been constructed to Cape Sidero Lighthouse, the elevated facsimile chapel of Saint Isidore, and Port Joannis, a cove of 2 fathoms (12 ft) (about 4 m). There are ruins of an ancient temple of Athena destroyed by a tsunami and facilities of the Kyriamadi Naval Station. Kyriamadi is the other island-like peninsula in the chain. Administratively the cape lies within the Itanos municipal unit, Sitia Municipality, Lasithi regional unit, and Crete region.

== Etymology ==
Sideros first appears in 16th century maps as Cauo S. Sideros, a Venetian name for capes such as San Sidero of Corfu. In Venetian, Sidero is a form of Isidore, referring to the Egyptian saint Isidore of Pelusium. The name has been corrupted to Sideros (σίδηρος), "iron" in Greek.

== Geography ==
Sideros is a roughly ovoid quasi-island with a long axis of 3 km (1.9 mi) bearing 65° (from N), and a short axis of 1.24 km (0.77 mi) bearing 155°. The maximum elevation is 222 m (728 ft) roughly in the center, the highest of the entire cape. Really a peninsula, the island is connected by a N-S isthmus approximately 174.17 m (571.4 ft) by 125.84 m (412.9 ft) with a road over it. The rocky terrain of the isthmus and the boulder terrain of the island make off-road walking difficult, although the beaches are excellent.

The coastline is coves (or the older term, "ports," which may not have any facilities) alternating with headlands. Much of the coast is cliffs bordered by strip beaches of fine sand. Sidero is unaccessible to the public except at specified times. A checkpoint and barbed wire gate the road with a sign that the peninsula is under military jurisdiction. On the west of the isthmus is Kyriamadi Bay (Port Kereamathi). The military base sits upon its north coast, with both an ancient and a modern jetty visible from the air. Facilities, including a helicopter pad, are built into the steep slopes. Photographs are discouraged, so pictures are scarce. About .75 mi (1.21 km) long, the bay varies in depth from about 3 fathoms (18 ft) near the isthmus to 30 fathoms (180 ft) at the mouth.

The waters around Sidero are highly dangerous to passing ships, although small-boat activity is frequent (water sports, beaching, etc.). Professional works on navigation recommend giving the cape a wide berth (a few miles). Looking from Kyriamadi Bay around Sidero in a CW direction, one finds the following "insular formations."

=== Spitfire rock ===
Spitfire Rock found at 35°19′08″N 26°14′59″E is classified as a reef (yphalos, "under the sea") by the Hydrographic Service of the Greek Navy (HSGN). Diameter is 10 yd (9.1 m). Depth is 1 fathom or less. Location is in the road between Sidero and the Dionysades. The name was assigned by Thomas Spratt in his 1852 survey of Crete aboard HMS Spitfire, under his command. He was proceeding through the passage between Sideros and the Dionysades, he said, with what he thought was all due circumspection, but in the centre, when his guide, Captain Manias, sometime revolutionary and pirate, warned him to steer on the Dionysiades side to avoid the reef. In commemoration of the event he named the rock after the ship, although he gives no further insight into his line of reasoning.

=== Sidero or Strongylos Island ===
The names of these formations vary by convention, this "island" sometimes being called an "islet." It should not be confused with the peninsula of Sideros itself, which also sometimes is called an island, nor should it be confused with another insular formation south of Crete called Strongylo, "round." The "round" etymology is straightforward and descriptive, while Sidero is named after the cape it is near.

This formation, Sidero islet, found at 35°19′07″N 26°18′03″E is classified as a "rock" (vrachos) by the HSGN. The diameter is 50 yd (46 m), which implies an area of 0.001643 km^{2}, an approximation, as the rock is not quite "round." The altitude is 5.5 m (18 ft), for which reason it cannot be a reef. It sits in about 35 fathoms (210 ft), 400 yd north of the cape (close inshore), about 1100 yd from the light.

== Maps ==
British admiralty chart. The latest date on the chart is 1895. The soundings were collected by HMS Spitfire in 1852. Soundings are in fathoms. Elevations are in feet.

== See also ==
- List of islands of Greece

== Reference bibliography ==
- Forbes, Edward; Spratt, T.A.B (1865). Travels and Researches in Crete. Vol. I, Travels in Lycia, Milyan, and the Cibyratis. London: John Van Voorst.
- Hydrographic Office (1942). Sailing Directions for the Mediterranean. Vol. IV, Libya, Egypt, Turkey (southern coast), Syria, Palestine, and the islands of Crete, Scarpanto, Rhodes, and Cyprus. Washington DC: US Government Printing Office.
- Kopaka, K.; Kossyva, A. (1999). "II An Island's Isles: Crete And Its Insular Components. A Preliminary Approach". Meletemata: Studies In Aegean Archaeology Presented To Malcolm H. Wiener As He Enters His 65th Year. Austin, Texas: Université de Liège.
- Smith, C.V.; et al. (1908). The Mediterranean Pilot. Vol. IV, Comprising the Archipelago, with the adjacent coasts of Greece, Bulgaria, and Turkey: including also the island of Crete or Candia (Fourth ed.). London: Hydrographic Office, Admiralty.
