= Albinaria janicollis =

Conservation status
- Vulnerable (IUCN 3.1)

Scientific classification
- Domain: Eukaryota
- Kingdom: Animalia
- Phylum: Mollusca
- Class: Gastropoda
- Order: Stylommatophora
- Family: Clausiliidae
- Genus: Albinaria
- Species: A. janicollis

Binomial name
- Albinaria janicollis Schultes & Wiese, 1991

Species of gastropod

Albinaria janicollis is a species of air-breathing land snail, a terrestrial pulmonate gastropod mollusk in the family Clausiliidae, the door snails.

== Distribution ==
This species occurs in Greece. It is endemic to Crete, where it occurs only on the Gianysada Island within the Islands of Dionysades.

== Description ==
This clausilid species is characterized by a small, prominently ribbed shell. It is not bulbously shaped but with a straight outline. At the penultimate whorl it is detached and protruding with a small aperture.
