= Albinaria idaea =

Conservation status
- Least Concern (IUCN 3.1)

Scientific classification
- Kingdom: Animalia
- Phylum: Mollusca
- Class: Gastropoda
- Order: Stylommatophora
- Family: Clausiliidae
- Genus: Albinaria
- Species: A. idaea

Binomial name
- Albinaria idaea Pfeiffer, 1850

Species of gastropod

Albinaria idaea is a species of air-breathing land snail, a terrestrial pulmonate gastropod mollusk in the family Clausiliidae, the door snails.

Two percostate populations are known. Based on shell characters, Albinaria idaea seems closely related to Albinaria ariadne, except that Albinaria ariadne has a weak basalis. It has been stated that further research is necessary to clarify the status of Albinaria ariadne.

== Distribution ==
This species occurs in Greece. It is known from central Crete and the Paximadia islands.

== Subspecies ==
There is no consensus concerning the identification of subspecies in Albinaria idaea. Two contradictory systems have been proposed:

- In 1977, Nordsieck distinguished 6 subspecies, of which one (Albinaria idaea zeus) was later rejected by Nordsieck in 1998. In 2017, one additional subspecies (Albinaria idaea letoana) was described by Nordsieck.
- In contrast, Welter Schultes and other authors did not agree with Nordsiecks subspecies classification and proposed to distinguish no subspecies at all.

Molecular genetic analyses have to clarify the status of the subspecies described.
