= Albinaria menelaus =

Conservation status
- Least Concern (IUCN 3.1)

Scientific classification
- Kingdom: Animalia
- Phylum: Mollusca
- Class: Gastropoda
- Order: Stylommatophora
- Family: Clausiliidae
- Genus: Albinaria
- Species: A. menelaus

Binomial name
- Albinaria menelaus Martens, 1873

Species of gastropod

Albinaria menelaus is a species of air-breathing land snail, a terrestrial pulmonate gastropod mollusk in the family Clausiliidae, the door snails. The species is endemic to Greece and only known from the southern Peloponnese.
