= Kyriamadi =

Peninsula in Cape Sideros, Crete, Greece

Native name: Κυριαμάδι
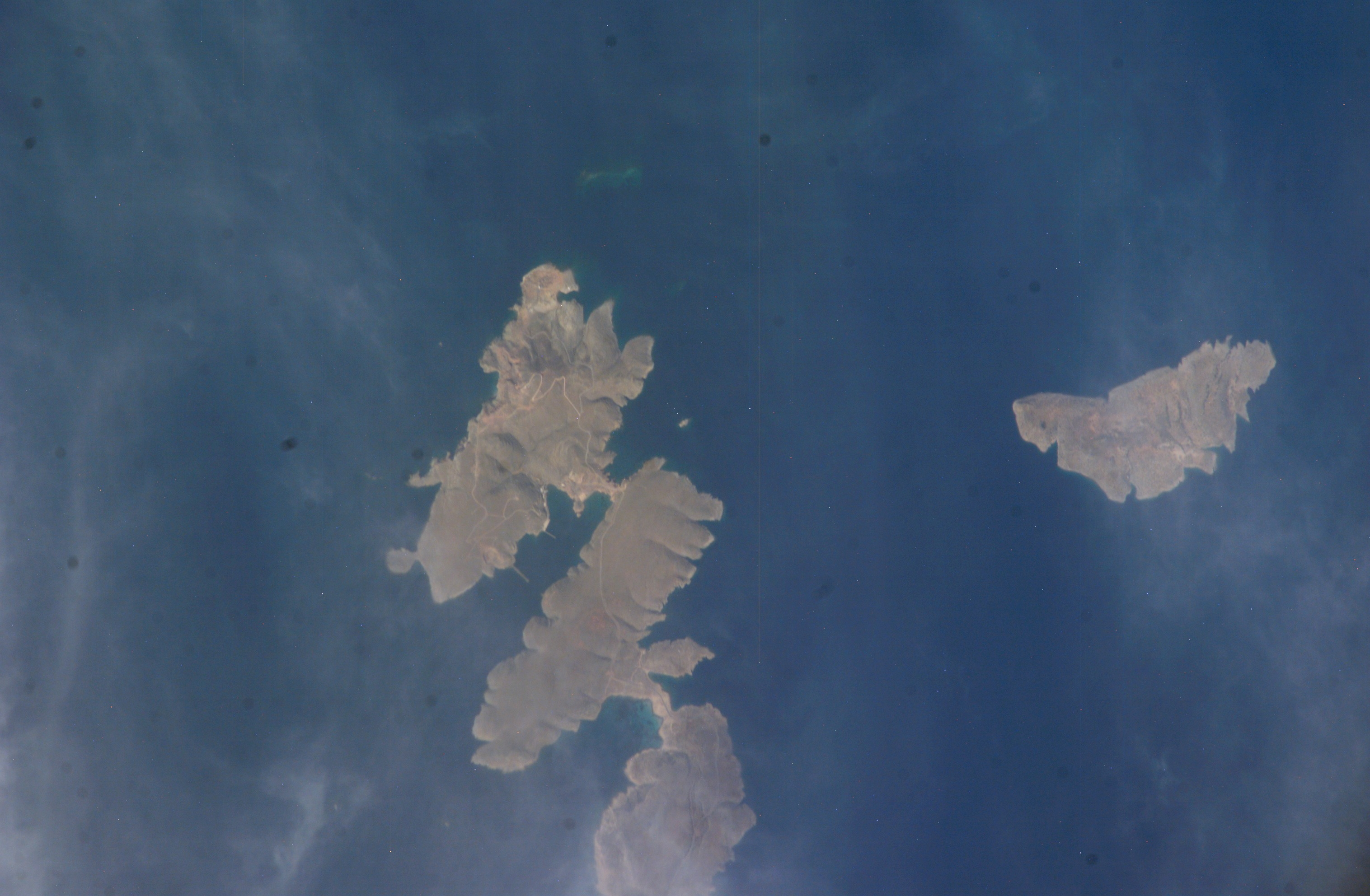
- Kyriamadi island on the left. Elasa islet on the right.

- Location within Crete

Geography
- Coordinates: 35.295°N 26.293°E
- Archipelago: Cretan Islands

Administration
- Greece
- Region: Crete
- Regional unit: Lasithi

Demographics
- Population: 26 (2001)

Kyriamadi or Kereamathi (Greek: Κυριαμάδι) has a double sense. Geographically it is the middle peninsula of Cape Sideros in the municipality of Sitia, in the northeast of Crete. Small land bridges connect it on the one hand to the Itanos promontory of mainland Crete to the southwest, and on the other hand the outermost peninsula Sideros to the northeast. In the Sea of Crete, just offshore to the west, are two small insular structures known as the Kyriamadi "islands" (which are hydrologically smaller than professionally defined islands and likely derive their name from the peninsula).

On the west of the northeastern land bridge is the Bay of Kyriamadi, after which the naval station is named, which is actually on Sideros. Similarly, "Kyriamadi Nature Park," a part of Sitia Geopark, sometimes marked as being on Sideros next to the Bay of Kyriamadi, is actually entirely on Kyriamadi. Administratively Kyriamadi is in Itanos municipal unit, Sitia municipality of Lasithi regional unit, Crete region.
