= Albinaria mixta =

Conservation status
- Least Concern (IUCN 3.1)

Scientific classification
- Kingdom: Animalia
- Phylum: Mollusca
- Class: Gastropoda
- Order: Stylommatophora
- Family: Clausiliidae
- Genus: Albinaria
- Species: A. mixta

Binomial name
- Albinaria mixta H. Nosdieck, 1984

Species of gastropod

Albinaria mixta is a species of air-breathing land snail, a terrestrial pulmonate gastropod mollusk in the family Clausiliidae, the door snails. The species is endemic to Greece and only known from the eastern Peloponnese.
