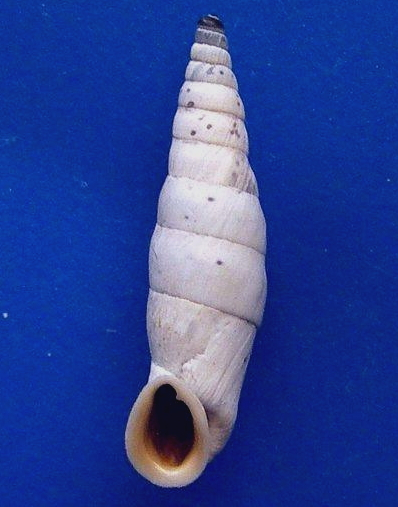
- Shell of Albinaria caerulea

Scientific classification
- Kingdom: Animalia
- Phylum: Mollusca
- Class: Gastropoda
- Order: Stylommatophora
- Family: Clausiliidae
- Genus: Albinaria
- Species: A. caerulea

Binomial name
- Albinaria caerulea (Deshayes, 1835)

= Albinaria caerulea =

Species of gastropod

Albinaria caerulea is a species of air-breathing rock-dwelling clausiliidae land snail, a terrestrial pulmonate gastropod mollusk in the family Clausiliidae, the door snails.

== Habitat ==
Albinaria caerulea lives, like most Albinaria species, on limestone substrates in semi-arid habitats, and aestivates on limestone rock-surfaces covered by lichens, algae and mosses.

== Description ==
This species has a medium-sized shell which is smooth and white, and measures up to 16 mm tall. Albinaria caerulea usually occurs in large numbers, however numbers can fall sharply if there are predators around such as birds. The estimated life of a snail of this species is around 7 years.

== Distribution ==
This species occurs in:

- Greece
