= Elasa =

Island in Greece

Native name: Ελάσα
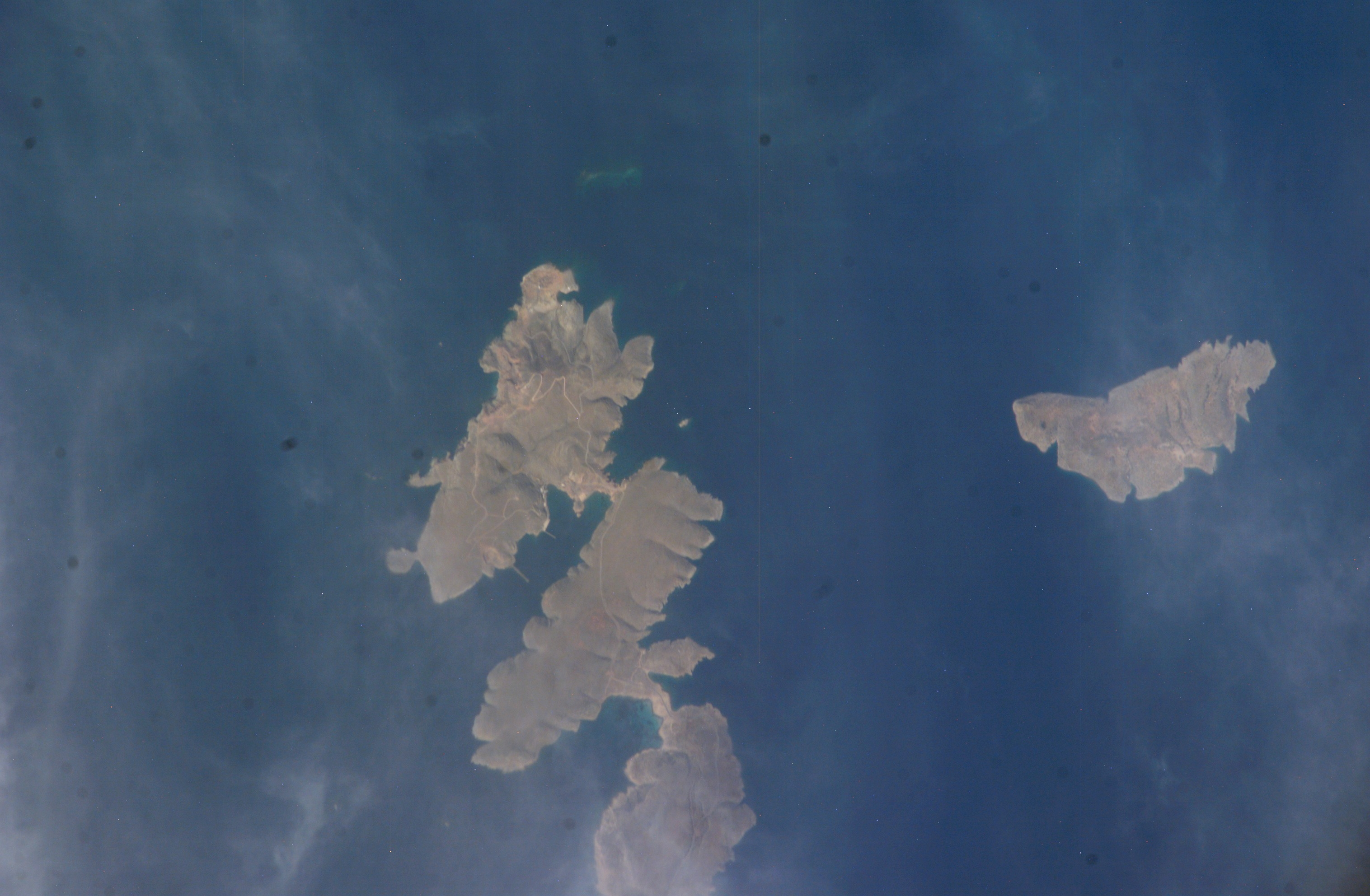
- Elasa island on the right. Kyriamadi island on the left.

- Location within Greece

Geography
- Coordinates: 35.273°N 26.340°E
- Archipelago: Cretan Islands
- Area: 1.746 km^{2} (0.674 sq mi)
- Highest point: 79

Administration
- Greece
- Region: Crete
- Regional unit: Lasithi

Demographics
- Population: 0 (2001)

Elasa (Greek: Ελάσα) is an island that can be found northeast of Crete in the Aegean Sea, about 3.5 nautical miles (6.5 kilometres; 4.0 miles) from the palm tree forest of Vai. It is rocky and uninhabited covering 1.9 square kilometres (0.7 square miles). Its highest point is 79 metres (259 feet) above sea level. Administratively it comes within the Itanos municipality in Lasithi.

== Environmentally protected area ==
Elasa is a neighbour of the Dionysades islands and is part of an environmentally protected area with many rare plants and animals including the Mediterranean monk seal.

== See also ==
- List of islands of Greece
