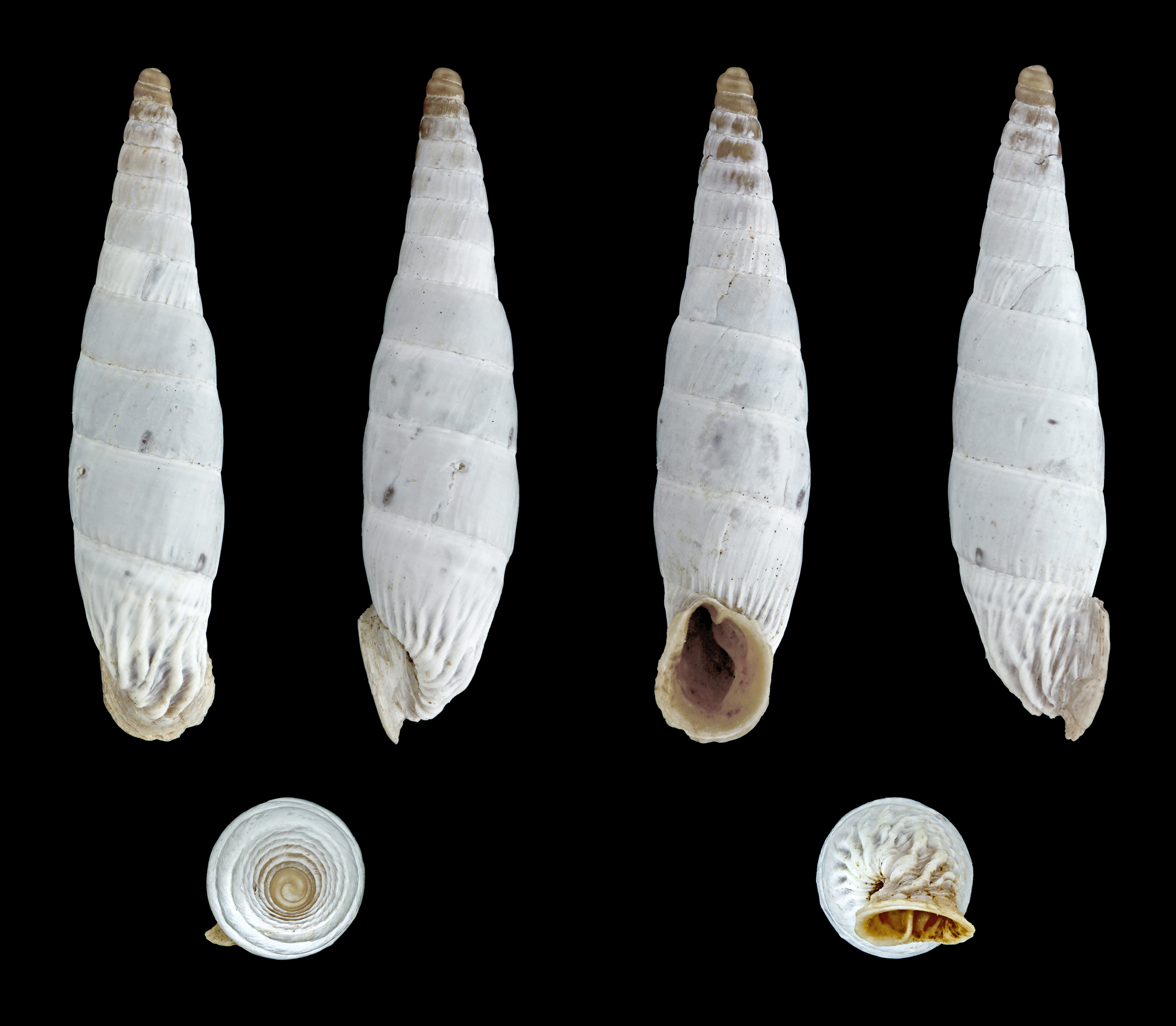
- Albinaria corrugata corrugata f. draparnaldi

Scientific classification
- Kingdom: Animalia
- Phylum: Mollusca
- Class: Gastropoda
- Order: Stylommatophora
- Family: Clausiliidae
- Genus: Albinaria
- Species: A. corrugata

Binomial name
- Albinaria corrugata (Bruguière, 1792)

Synonyms
- List: Albinaria (Albinaria) corrugata (Bruguière, 1792); Albinaria (Mirabellina) corrugata (Bruguière, 1792); Bulimus corrugatus Bruguière, 1792; Clausilia (Albinaria) corrugata (Bruguière, 1792)

= Albinaria corrugata =

Species of gastropod

Albinaria corrugata is a species of air-breathing land snails, terrestrial pulmonate gastropod molluscs in the family Clausiliidae, the door snails.

== Distribution ==
This species occurs in:

- Greece

== Description ==
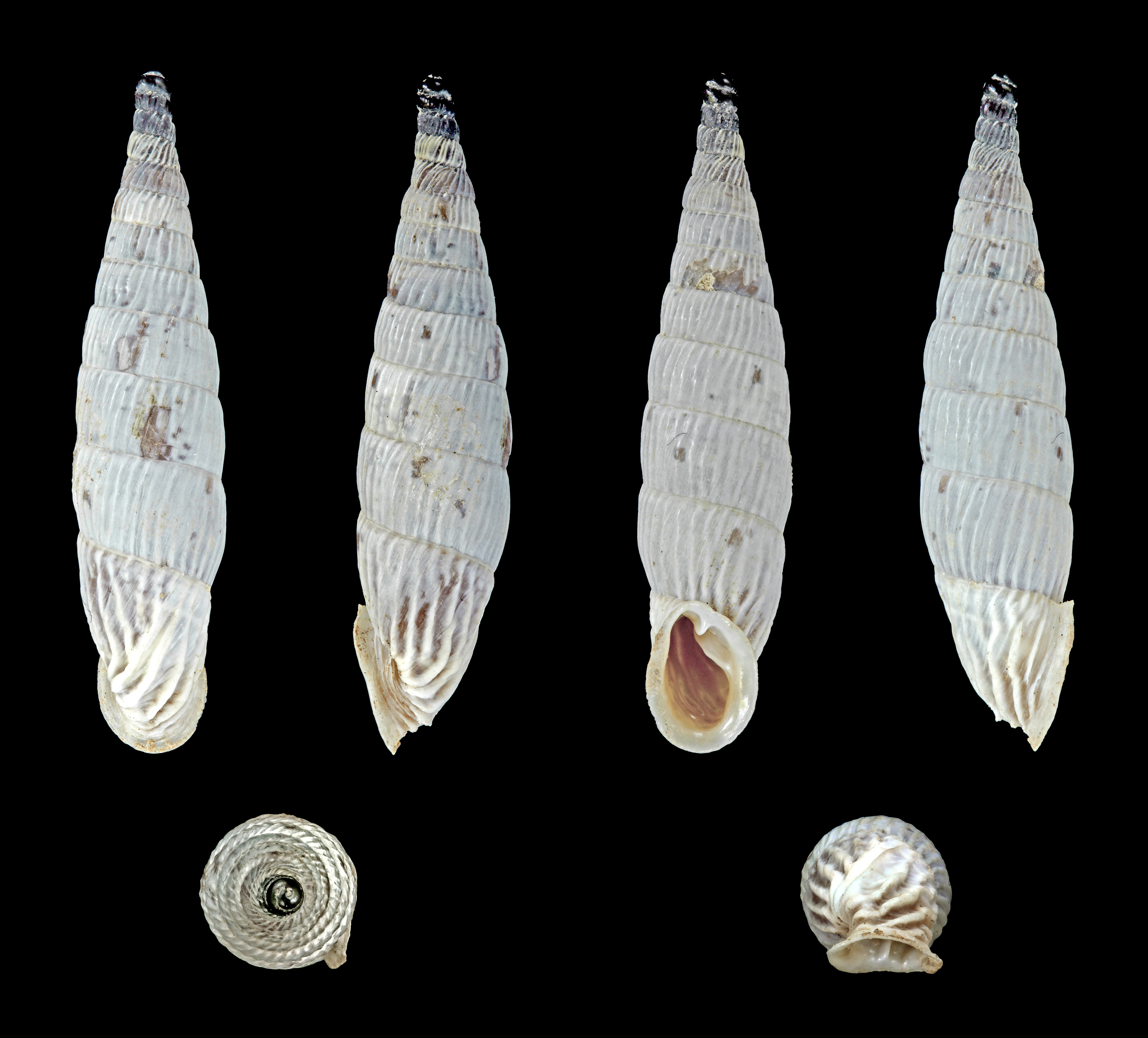
Albinaria corrugata corrugata f. inflata

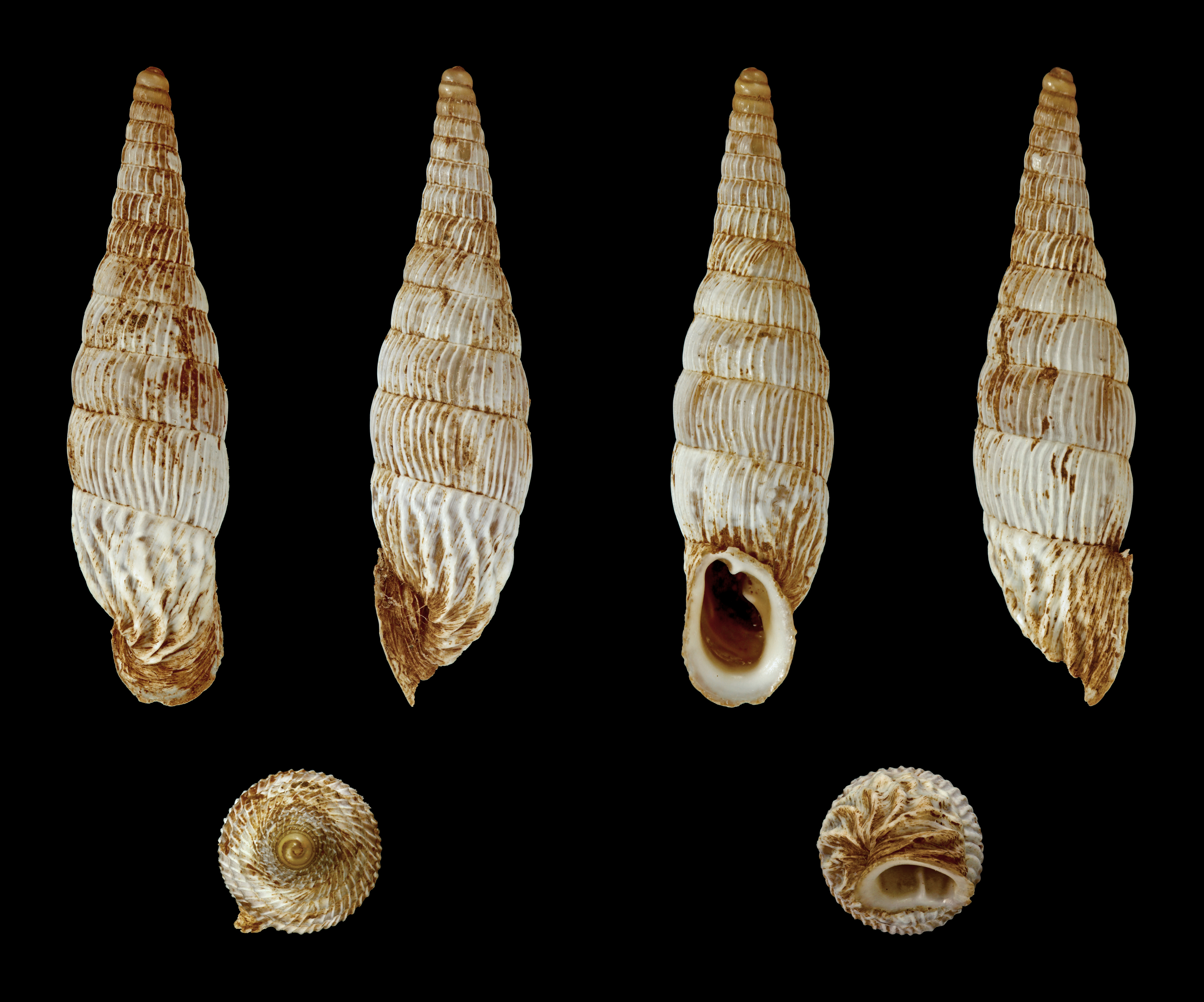
Albinaria corrugata leonisorum
