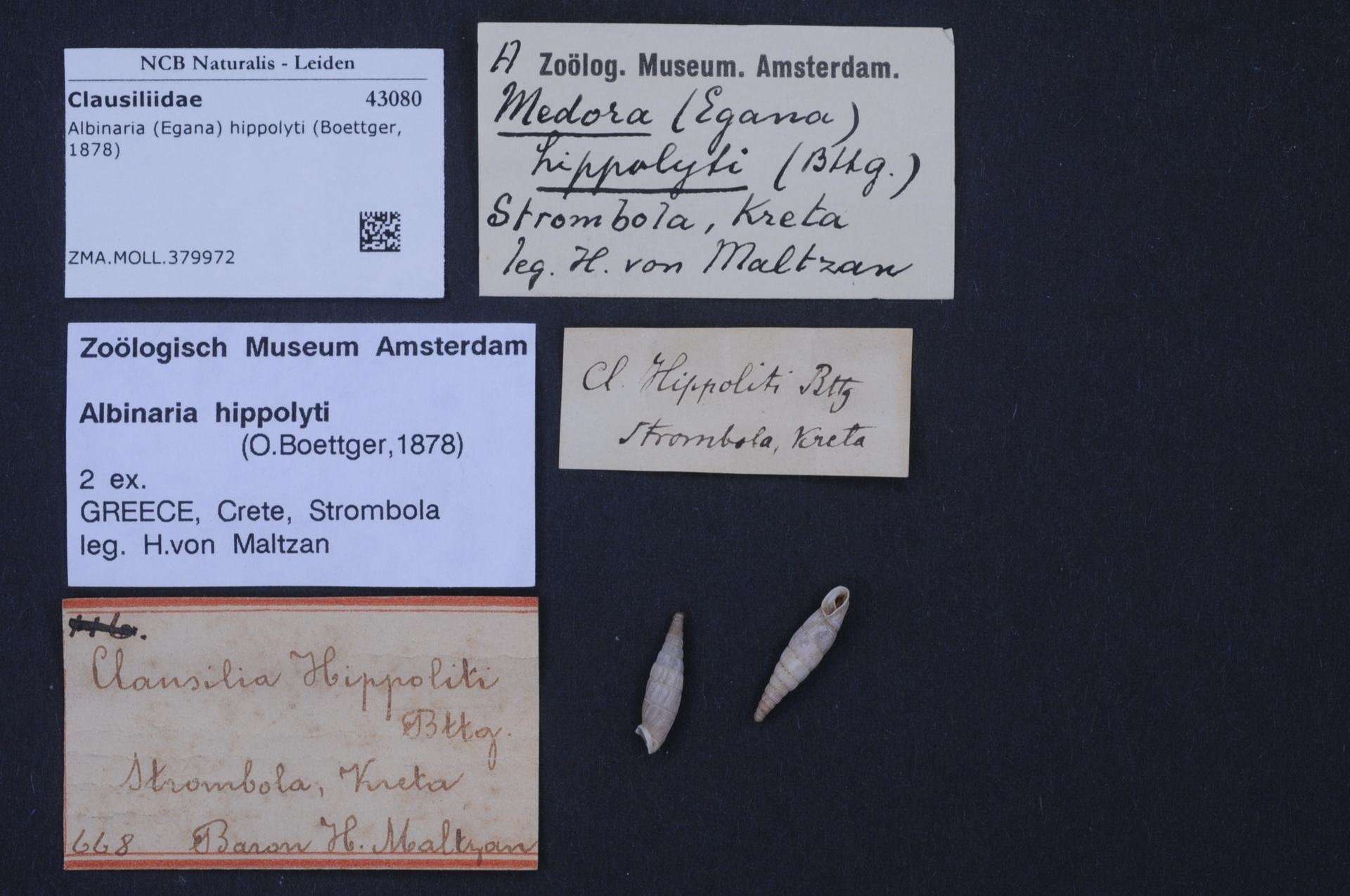

Scientific classification
- Kingdom: Animalia
- Phylum: Mollusca
- Class: Gastropoda
- Order: Stylommatophora
- Family: Clausiliidae
- Genus: Albinaria
- Species: A. hippolyti

Binomial name
- Albinaria hippolyti Boettger, 1878

= Albinaria hippolyti =

Species of gastropod

Albinaria hippolyti is a species of air-breathing land snails, terrestrial pulmonate gastropod mollusks with a white striped shell in the genus Albinaria of the family Clausiliidae, the door snails. Five subspecies are recognized.
