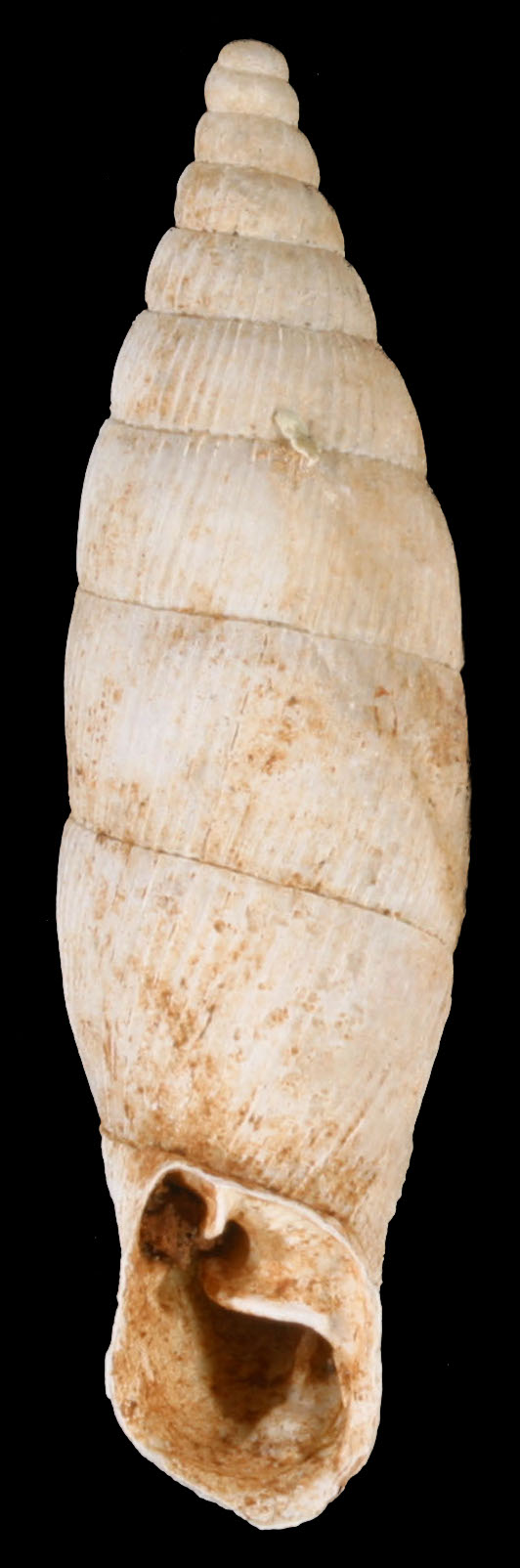
- Apertural view of a shell of Albinaria latelamellaris

Scientific classification
- Kingdom: Animalia
- Phylum: Mollusca
- Class: Gastropoda
- Order: Stylommatophora
- Family: Clausiliidae
- Genus: Albinaria
- Species: A. latelamellaris

Binomial name
- Albinaria latelamellaris Neubert, Örstan & Welter-Schultes, 2000

= Albinaria latelamellaris =

Species of gastropod

Albinaria latelamellaris is a species of air-breathing land snail, a terrestrial pulmonate gastropod mollusk in the family Clausiliidae, the door snails.

== Distribution ==
This species occurs in:

- Turkey
