= Albinaria sphakiota =

Conservation status
- Vulnerable (IUCN 3.1)

Scientific classification
- Kingdom: Animalia
- Phylum: Mollusca
- Class: Gastropoda
- Order: Stylommatophora
- Family: Clausiliidae
- Genus: Albinaria
- Species: A. sphakiota

Binomial name
- Albinaria sphakiota (Maltzan, 1887)

Synonyms
- Clausilia sphakiota; Albinaria porphyrostoma

Species of gastropod

Albinaria sphakiota is a species of air-breathing land snail, a terrestrial pulmonate gastropod mollusk in the family Clausiliidae, the door snails. The species is endemic to Crete.

== Distribution ==
This species occurs in Greece. It is known from steep gorges in Sfakia, western Crete: Imbros Gorge, Aradena Gorge and Asfendou Gorge.

== See also ==
- Albinaria sphakiota
- List of non-marine molluscs of Greece
