= Albinaria ariadne =

Conservation status
- Vulnerable (IUCN 3.1)

Scientific classification
- Kingdom: Animalia
- Phylum: Mollusca
- Class: Gastropoda
- Order: Stylommatophora
- Family: Clausiliidae
- Genus: Albinaria
- Species: A. ariadne

Binomial name
- Albinaria ariadne Schilthuizen & Gittenberger, 1991

Species of gastropod

Albinaria ariadne is a species of air-breathing land snail, a terrestrial pulmonate gastropod mollusk in the family Clausiliidae, the door snails. The species is endemic to Crete.

It has been stated that further research is necessary whether Albinaria ariadne is an independent species. Based on shell characters it seems closely related to Albinaria idaea, except that Albinaria ariadne has a weak basalis.

== Distribution ==
This species occurs in Greece. It is only known from a local occurrence near Orthés (S of Perama) in northern central Crete.
