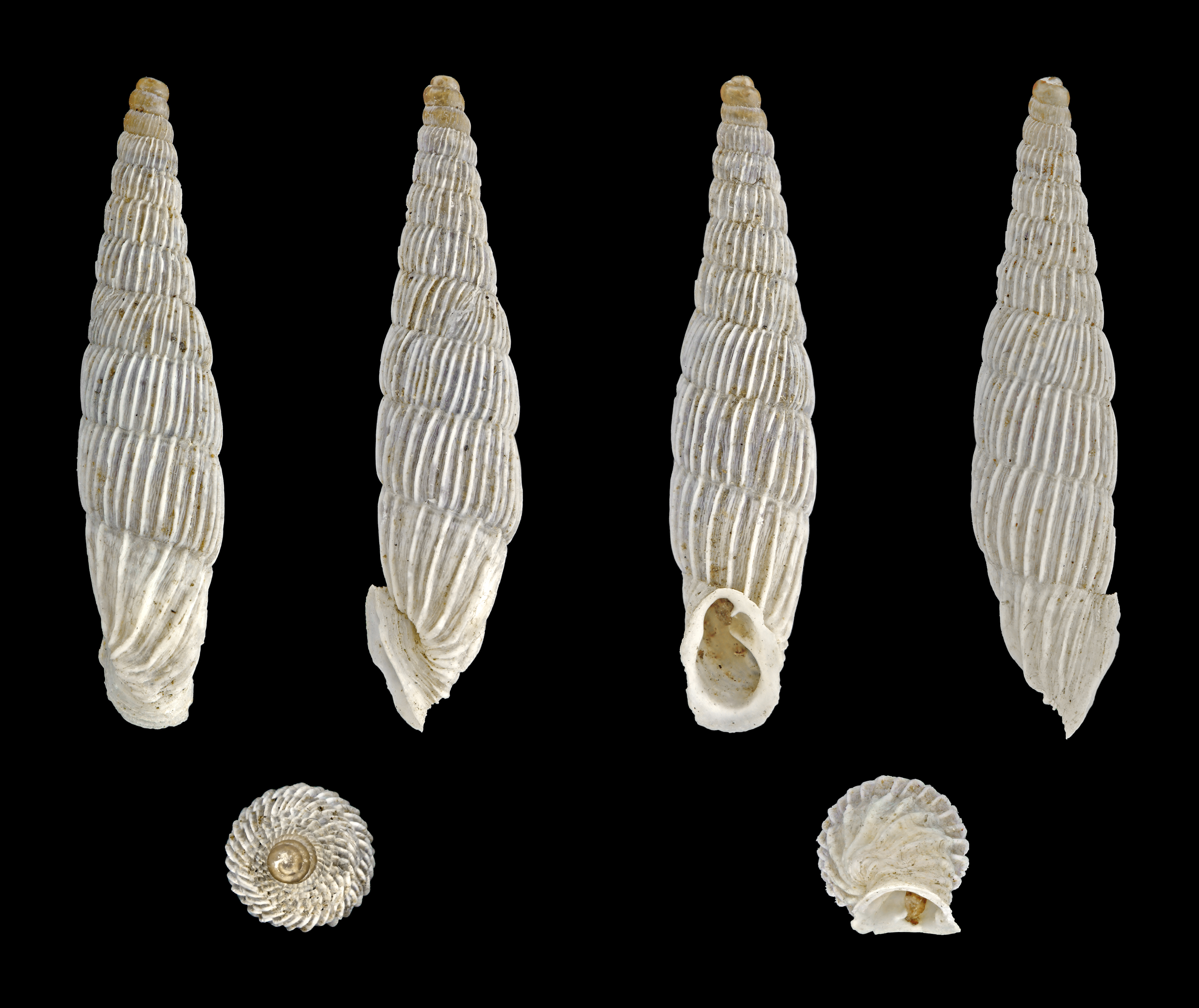
- The shell of Albinaria lerosiensis, length 18 mm.

Scientific classification
- Kingdom: Animalia
- Phylum: Mollusca
- Class: Gastropoda
- Order: Stylommatophora
- Family: Clausiliidae
- Genus: Albinaria
- Species: A. lerosiensis

Binomial name
- Albinaria lerosiensis (Pfeiffer, 1841)

= Albinaria lerosiensis =

Species of gastropod

Albinaria lerosiensis is a species of air-breathing land snail, a terrestrial pulmonate gastropod mollusk in the family Clausiliidae, the door snails.

== Distribution ==
This species occurs in:

- Greece
