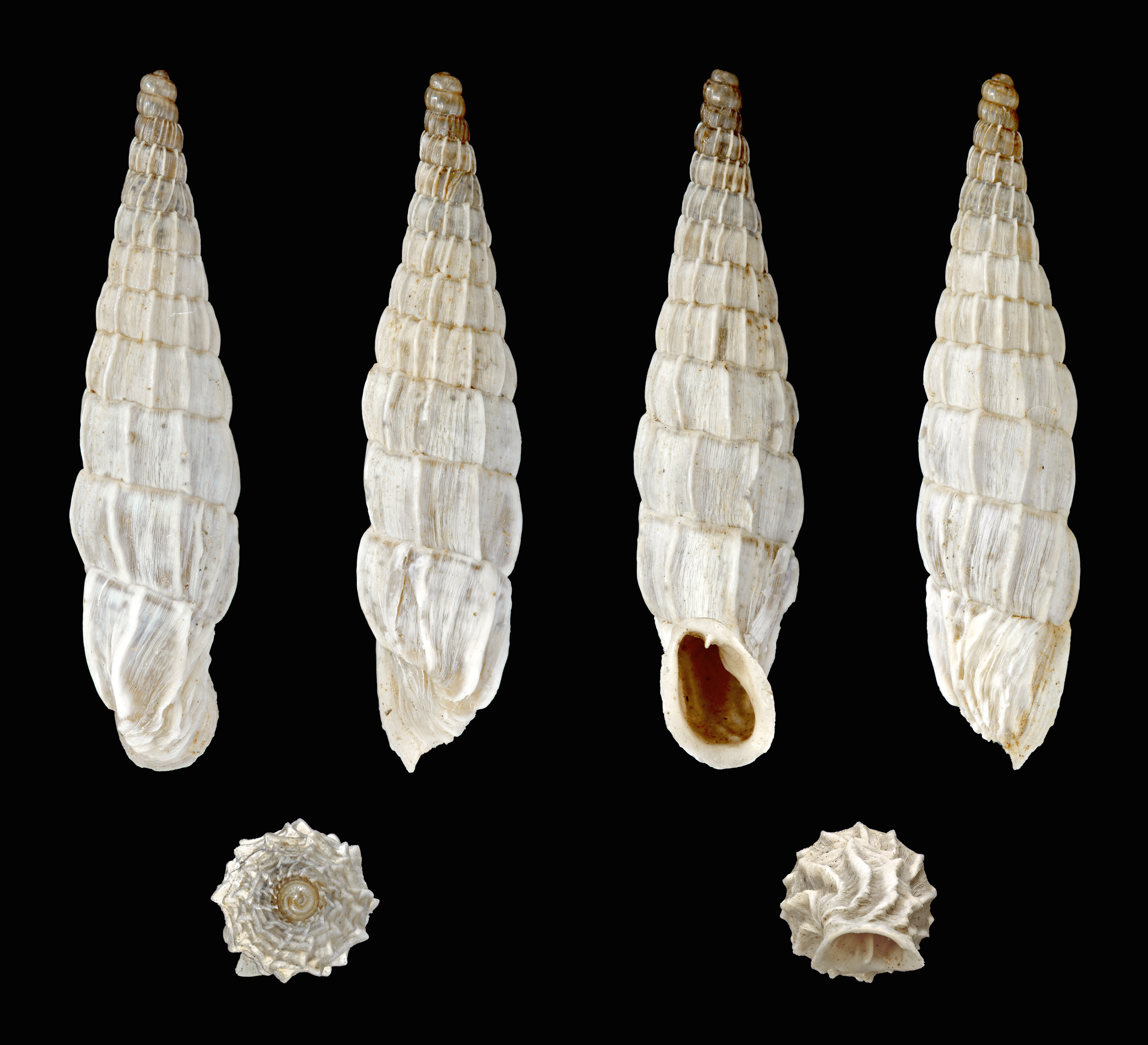
- The shell of Albinaria praeclara praeclara, length 19 mm.

Scientific classification
- Domain: Eukaryota
- Kingdom: Animalia
- Phylum: Mollusca
- Class: Gastropoda
- Order: Stylommatophora
- Family: Clausiliidae
- Genus: Albinaria
- Species: A. praeclara

Binomial name
- Albinaria praeclara (Pfeiffer, 1853)

= Albinaria praeclara =

Species of gastropod

Albinaria praeclara is a species of air-breathing land snail, a terrestrial pulmonate gastropod mollusk in the family Clausiliidae, the door snails.

== Distribution ==
This species occurs in:

- Greece
