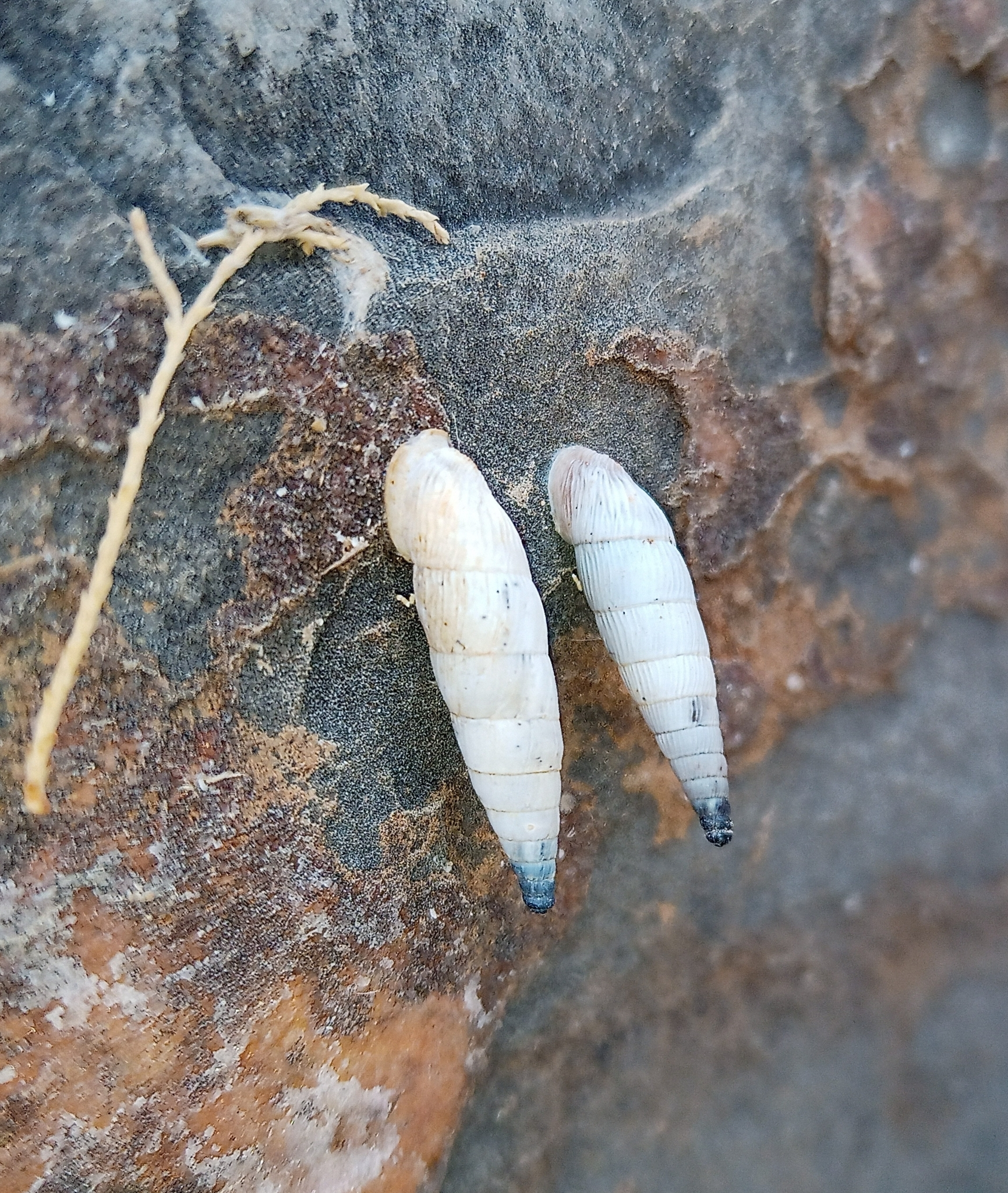

Conservation status
- Vulnerable (IUCN 3.1)

Scientific classification
- Kingdom: Animalia
- Phylum: Mollusca
- Class: Gastropoda
- Order: Stylommatophora
- Family: Clausiliidae
- Genus: Albinaria
- Species: A. moreletiana

Binomial name
- Albinaria moreletiana Boettger, 1878
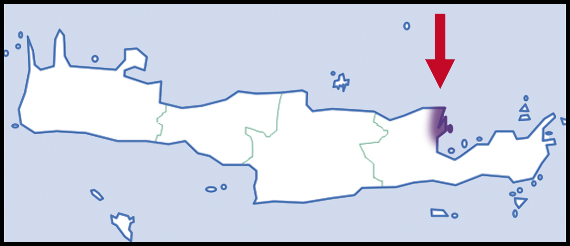
- Range of Albinaria moreletiana (purple)

= Albinaria moreletiana =

Species of gastropod

Albinaria moreletiana is a species of air-breathing land snail, a terrestrial pulmonate gastropod mollusk in the family Clausiliidae, the door snails. The species is endemic to Crete.
