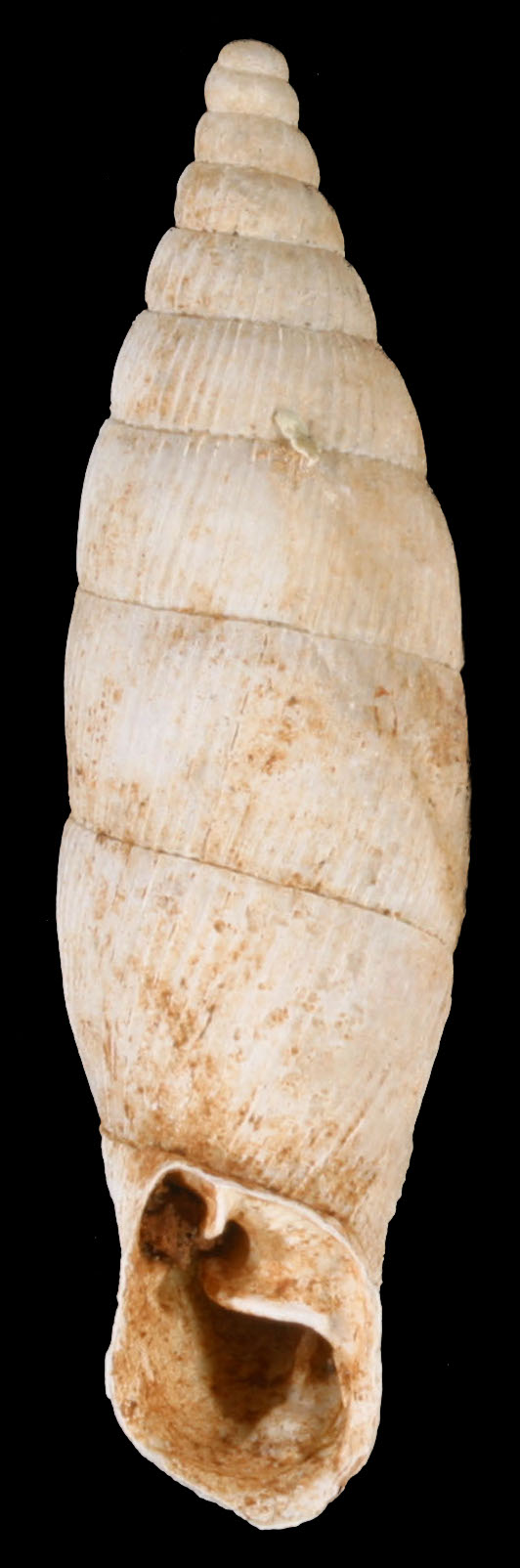
- Apertural view of a shell of Albinaria latelamellaris

Scientific classification
- Domain: Eukaryota
- Kingdom: Animalia
- Phylum: Mollusca
- Class: Gastropoda
- Order: Stylommatophora
- Family: Clausiliidae
- Tribe: Medorini
- Genus: Albinaria; Vest, 1867

Diversity
- 116 species

= Albinaria =

Genus of gastropods

Albinaria is a genus of air-breathing land snails, terrestrial pulmonate gastropod mollusks in the family Clausiliidae, called the door snails.

== Ecology and Life Cycle ==
These species of snails live on limestone rocks, where they feed on algae and lichen. They are known to be active during the rainy seasons, that is, in Mediterranean lowlands, from November to April. Eggs are laid shortly after the beginning of the wet season. It takes two to three wet seasons for development from a juvenile to a fully grown shell . During the intermittent dry seasons, both young and adult snails, aestivate ("the warm weather equivalent of hibernation") on the rocks or in crevices inside the rocks. For aestivation, aggregates are often formed, sometimes reaching sizes of many hundreds of individuals. During the last dry season prior to sexual maturation, the subadult snail (the shell of which is already fully developed, albeit thinner than that of an adult) increases the size of its genital organs. Copulation then takes place during the first weeks of autumn rains. Population densities can sometimes be very high, in spite of heavy predation by beetle larvae of the genus Drilus. These insects attack the snails during their aestivation, perforating the shell and eating the snail inside.

== Distribution ==
Distribution of the genus Albinaria includes:

- southern Albania
- Greece
- Cyprus
- western and southern Turkey
- Lebanon

== Species ==
Species in this genus include 111 species:

- Albinaria adrianae Gittenberger, 1979
- Albinaria adriani (Gittenberger, 1987)
- Albinaria alajana (Boettger, 1896)
- Albinaria amalthea (Westerlund, 1878)
- Albinaria anatolica (Roth, 1839)
- Albinaria arcadica (Boettger, 1878)
- Albinaria argynnis (Westerlund, 1898)
- Albinaria ariadne Schilthuizen & Gittenberger, 1991
- Albinaria arthuriana (Boettger, 1878)
- Albinaria avia (Charpentier, 1852)
- Albinaria basalifera Neubert, 1992
- Albinaria bigibbosula (Westerlund, 1878)
- Albinaria brevicollis (Pfeiffer, 1850)
- Albinaria broemmei (Boettger, 1892)
- Albinaria butoti (Nordsieck, 1984)
- Albinaria byzantina (Charpentier, 1852)
- Albinaria caerulea (Deshayes, 1835)
- Albinaria campylauchen (Boettger, 1883)
- Albinaria candida (Pfeiffer, 1850)
- Albinaria cerigottana (Boettger, 1894)
- Albinaria christae Wiese, 1989
- Albinaria compressa (Pfeiffer, 1850)
- Albinaria confusa (Boettger, 1878)
- Albinaria contaminata (Rossmässler, 1835)
- Albinaria corrugata (Bruguière, 1792)
- Albinaria cretensis (Rossmässler, 1836)
- Albinaria cristatella (Küster, 1861)
- Albinaria cytherae (Boettger, 1894)
- Albinaria discolor (Pfeiffer, 1846)
- Albinaria eburnea (Pfeiffer, 1854)
- Albinaria edmundi (Gittenberger, 1987)
- Albinaria evelynae Gittenberger, 1998
- Albinaria forbesiana (Pfeiffer, 1846)
- Albinaria freytagi (Boettger, 1889)
- Albinaria fuchskaeufeli Nordsieck, 1977
- Albinaria gerolimena Nordsieck, 1974
- Albinaria grayana (Pfeiffer, 1846)
- Albinaria greeni Tomlin, 1935
- Albinaria grisea (Deshayes, 1835)
- Albinaria haessleini Fauer, 1978
- Albinaria hians (Boettger, 1878)
- Albinaria hippolyti (Boettger, 1878)
- Albinaria hohorsti Nordsieck, 1984
- Albinaria idaea (Pfeiffer, 1850)
- Albinaria idyllica (Gittenberger, 1987)
- Albinaria ietswaarti Gittenberger & Menkhorst, 1992
- Albinaria inauris (Boettger, 1896)
- Albinaria ithomensis Nordsieck, 1984
- Albinaria jaeckeli Wiese, 1989
- Albinaria janicollis Schultes & Wiese, 1991
- Albinaria janisadana Loosjes, 1955
- Albinaria jonica (Pfeiffer, 1866)
- Albinaria kemerensis Nordsieck, 1993
- Albinaria klemmi Paget, 1971
- Albinaria krueperi (Pfeiffer, 1866)
- Albinaria latelamellaris Neubert, Örstan & Welter-Schultes, 2000
- Albinaria lerosiensis (Pfeiffer, 1841)
- Albinaria li Welter-Schultes, 1999
- Albinaria linnei Gittenberger, 2008
- Albinaria litoraria Neubert, 1998
- Albinaria lycica Nordsieck, 1993
- Albinaria maculosa (Deshayes, 1835)
- Albinaria maltzani (Böttger, 1883)
- Albinaria manselli (Boettger, 1883)
- Albinaria mavromoustakisi Brandt, 1961
- Albinaria menelaus (Martens, 1873)
- Albinaria mixta Nordsieck, 1984
- Albinaria monocristata Neubert, 1992
- Albinaria moreletiana (Boettger, 1878)
- Albinaria munda (Rossmässler, 1836)
- Albinaria myrensis Nordsieck, 1993
- Albinaria nadimi Tohme & Tohme, 1988
- Albinaria nivea (Pfeiffer, 1854)
- Albinaria olivieri (Roth, 1839)
- Albinaria papillifera Nordsieck, 1993
- Albinaria pellucida Nordsieck, 1993
- Albinaria pelocarinata Gittenberger, 1994
- Albinaria percristata Nordsieck, 1993
- Albinaria petrosa (Pfeiffer, 1849)
- Albinaria praeclara (Pfeiffer, 1853)
- Albinaria profuga (Charpentier, 1852)
- Albinaria proteus (Boettger, 1889)
- Albinaria puella (Pfeiffer, 1850)
- Albinaria rebeli Wagner, 1924
- Albinaria rechingeri Paget, 1971
- Albinaria retusa (Olivier, 1801)
- Albinaria rollei (Boettger, 1896)
- Albinaria saxatilis (Pfeiffer, 1846)
- Albinaria schuetti Nordsieck, 1984
- Albinaria scopulosa (Charpentier, 1852)
- Albinaria senilis (Rossmässler, 1836)
- Albinaria solicola Neubert, 1998
- Albinaria sphakiota (Maltzan, 1887)
- Albinaria spratti (Pfeiffer, 1846)
- Albinaria staudingeri (Boettger, 1890)
- Albinaria sturanyi Wagner, 1924
- Albinaria subaii (Nordsieck, 1984)
- Albinaria sublamellosa (Boettger, 1883)
- Albinaria supercarinata Gittenberger & Menkhorst, 1992
- Albinaria tenuicostata (Pfeiffer, 1864)
- Albinaria terebra (Pfeiffer, 1853)
- Albinaria teres (Olivier, 1801)
- Albinaria thiesseae (Boettger, 1880)
- Albinaria torticollis (Olivier, 1801)
- Albinaria turrita (Pfeiffer, 1850)
- Albinaria violacea Schilthuizen & Gittenberger, 1990
- Albinaria virgo (Mousson, 1854)
- Albinaria voithii (Rossmässler, 1836)
- Albinaria wettsteini Fuchs & Käufel, 1936
- Albinaria wiesei Gittenberger, 1988
- Albinaria xanthostoma (Böttger, 1883)
- Albinaria zilchi Fauer, 1993
