= HMS Spitfire =

Ten ships of the Royal Navy have carried the name HMS Spitfire, while an eleventh was planned but renamed before entering service. All are named after the euphemistic translation of Cacafuego, a Spanish treasure galleon captured by Sir Francis Drake.

- HMS Spitfire (1776) was an 8-gun galley purchased in 1776 in North America for Mouatt's squadron at Falmouth, Massachusetts. When Admiral d'Estaing's squadron arrived in Narragansett Bay on 29 July 1778, she, HMS Kingfisher, and HM galley Alarm were all burnt the next day to prevent the French from capturing them. Spitfire was run ashore on North Sandy Point and then burnt.
- HMS Spitfire (1778) was an 8-gun galley purchased and commissioned in 1778. The Surveillante captured her on 19 April 1779, near the Azores. The French took her to Lorient where as Crachefeu she was sold that same month for £t16,147.
- HMS Spitfire was an 8-gun sloop launched in 1752 as HMS Speedwell (1752). She was converted to a fireship and renamed HMS Spitfire in 1779 and was sold in 1780.
- HMS Spitfire (1780) was a 14-gun fireship purchased in 1780. Her fate is unknown.
- HMS Spitfire (1782) was a 16-gun fireship launched in 1782 and sold in 1825.
- HMS Spitfire (1793) was the French privateer schooner Poulette captured and purchased in 1793. She capsized in 1794.
- HMS Spitfire (1798) was a schooner of 64 tons burthen captured from the French in 1798. She was wrecked off the Amirante Islands in August 1801.
- HMS Spitfire (1834) was a wooden paddle vessel launched in 1834 and wrecked in 1842.
- HMS Spitfire (1845) was a wooden paddle gunvessel launched in 1845 by Oliver Lang. She became a survey vessel in 1851, a tug in 1862 and was broken up in 1888.
- HMS Spitfire (1895) was a Swordfish-class destroyer launched in 1895 and sold in 1912.
- HMS Spitfire (1912) was an Acasta-class destroyer launched in 1912 and sold for breaking up in 1921.
- HMS Spitfire was to have been a C-class destroyer. She was renamed HMS Cambrian (R85) in 1942 and launched in 1943.

== Other British military vessels named Spitfire ==
- Spitfire was a gunboat that the garrison at Gibraltar launched in June 1782 during the Great Siege of Gibraltar. She was one of 12. Each was armed with an 18-pounder gun, and received a crew of 21 men drawn from Royal Navy vessels stationed at Gibraltar. Brilliant provided Spitfire's crew.

== See also ==
- HMS Crachefeu, "Crachefeu" being French for "Spitfire".
- Supermarine Spitfire, the fighter aircraft of World War II.
