= Isidore of Pelusium =

Christian monk and saint

Saint Isidore of Pelusium
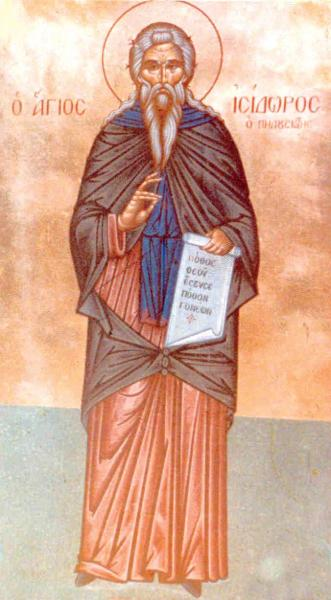
- Isidore of Pelusium

Abbot
- Born: c. 370 AD; Alexandria, Egypt
- Died: c. 450 AD (aged 80); Egypt
- Venerated in: Catholic Church; Eastern Orthodox Church; Eastern Catholic Churches; Oriental Orthodox Churches
- Feast: 4 February

Isidore of Pelusium (Ancient Greek: Ἰσίδωρος ὁ Πηλουσιώτης, born. c. 370 AD - died. c.450 AD) was born in Egypt to a prominent Alexandrian family. He became an ascetic, and moved to a mountain near the city of Pelusium, in the tradition of the Desert Fathers.

Isidore is known to us for his letters, written to Cyril of Alexandria, Theodosius II, and a host of others. A collection of 2,000 letters was made in antiquity at the "Sleepless" monastery in Constantinople, and this has come down to us through a number of manuscripts, with each letter numbered and in order. The letters are mostly very short extracts, a sentence or two in length. Further unpublished letters exist in Syriac translation.

Some of the letters are of considerable interest for the exegesis of the Greek Bible. He is revered as a saint, whose feast day is February 4.

== Life ==
Isidore of Pelusium lived during the fourth and fifth centuries. He was a native of Alexandria, and a relative of Theophilus, Archbishop of Alexandria.

He was an only child. His parents taught him the books of the church and the Greek language, in which he excelled. He was also ascetic and humble. When he learned that the people of Alexandria and the bishops wanted to make him the Patriarch of Alexandria, he took flight by night to Pelusium and became a monk in a monastery there. He soon became known for his exactitude in the observance of the rule and for his austerities. A passage in his voluminous correspondence affords reason to believe that he held the office of abbot.

Following the example of John Chrysostom, whom he had managed to see and hear during a trip to Constantinople, Isidore devoted himself primarily to Christian preaching. Yet he writes in one letter, "It is more important to be proficient in good works than in golden-tongued preaching".

His friendship with John Chrysostom resulted in his support of John when he was persecuted by the empress Eudoxia and Pope Theophilus.

Through the initiative of Isidore, the Third Ecumenical Council was convened at Ephesus (431), at which Nestorianism was condemned.

Isidore of Pelusium died about the year 450. His feast day is February 4.

== Letters ==
The only extant work of Isidore is a large collection of extracts from his correspondence, comprising more than 2000 letters. The historian Nicephorus states that Isidore wrote more than 10,000 letters to various people, in which he reprimanded one, advised another, consoled a third, instructed a fourth.

These letters of Isidore may be divided into three classes according to the subjects treated: those dealing with dogma and Scripture, with ecclesiastical and monastic discipline, and with practical morality for the guidance of laymen of all classes and conditions. His letter to Tuba shows that it was considered unbecoming for a soldier to carry a sword in the city in time of peace and to appear in public with arms and military uniform.

His advice with regard to those who were embracing the monastic state was that they should not at first be made to feel all the austerities of the rule lest they should be repelled, nor should they be left idle and exempt from ordinary tasks lest they should acquire habits of laziness, but they should led step by step to what is most perfect. Great abstinences serve no purpose unless they are accompanied by the mortification of the senses. A monk's habit should if possible be of skins, and his food consist of herbs, unless bodily weakness require something more.

Prior to the Nestorian controversy Isidore of Pelusium, a mentor to Cyril of Alexandria and other bishops, warned Cyril already then in a letter that he needed to "Stop these contentious arguments. Refrain from involving the living Church in your own private vengeance that is prosecuted out of a sense of duty to the dead." Isidore wrote this letter because of Cyril's refusal to restore John Chrysostom's name to the diptychs of the Church in Alexandria after it had been removed following John's deposition at the Synod of Oak in 403, which he later agreed to restore.

The letters can be found in volume 78 of the Patrologia Graeca, a collection of the Greek writings of Christian writers and theologians featuring the original Greek text and a facing Latin translation. Unfortunately the letters are not given in the correct order. Pierre Evieux edited the second half of the collection, where the disarrangement was most serious, in 1997 and 2000, in the Sources Chrétiennes series. He also produced a table of cross-reference between the original numbering and that in the Patrologia Graeca. The other letters have never received any critical edition or been translated into any modern language.

Severus of Antioch references several letters in his work (Contra Grammaticum, III.39) with high praise. The Syriac translation of a collection containing 126 letters is preserved.
