= Dionysades =

Small archipelago off Crete, Greece

Native name: Διονυσάδες
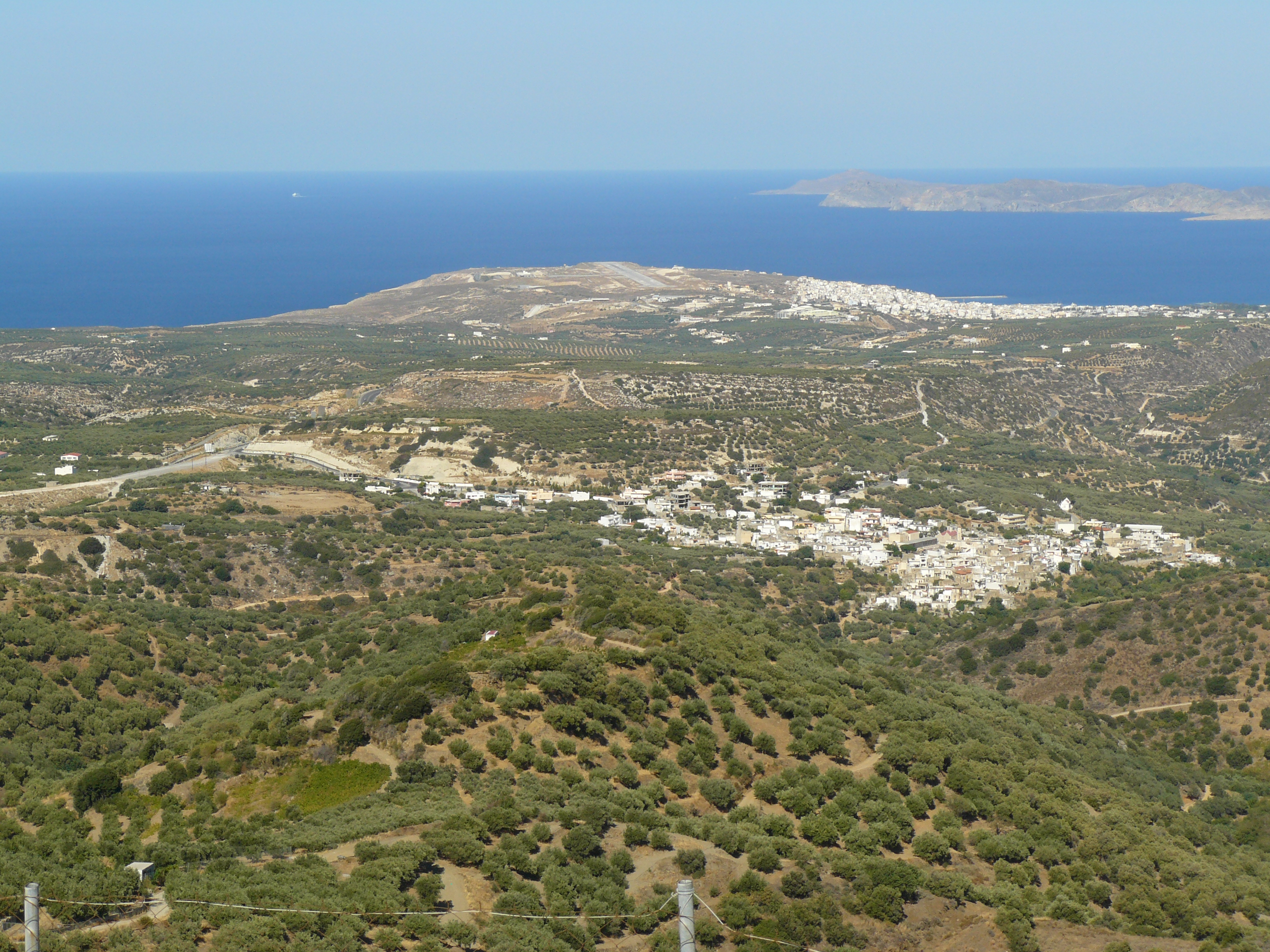
- Distant view of the Dionysades group from Sitia

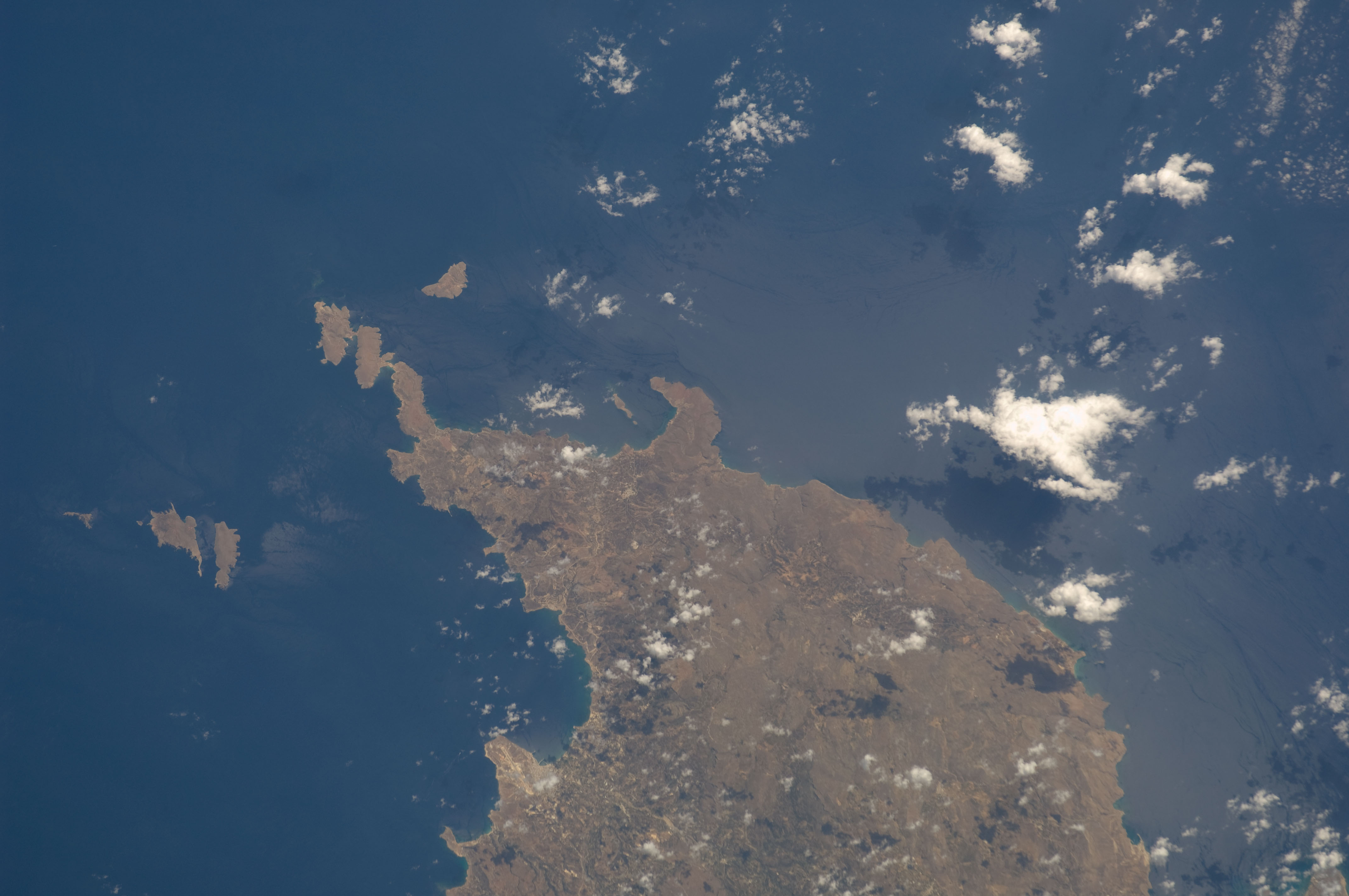
- This north–south alignment of Crete depicts the northeast promontory at the top. The Dionysiades are to the north (upper left).

- Location of Dionysades

Geography
- Coordinates: 35°21′N 26°11′E
- Archipelago: Cretan Islands
- Total islands: 4

Administration
- Greece
- Region: Crete
- Regional unit: Lasithi

Demographics
- Population: 0 (2001)

The Dionysades (Greek: Διονυσάδες, also Γιανυσάδες - Gianysades) is a small, northward-trending archipelago off the north coast of the island of Crete, mid-way between the Cape Sidero lighthouse to the southeast (from which they are about 12.61 km (7.84 mi) distant); and Sitia to the southwest (from which they are approximately 17.6 km (10.9 mi) distant). Although the island group is uninhabited, it administratively falls within the Sitia municipal unit of the Lasithi Region, Crete Regional Administration. The group includes the islands of Dragonada, Gianysada, Paximadaki, and Paximada.

== Etymology ==
The name, Dionysades, is an ancient one. Diodorus Siculus mentions it in his Bibliotheca Historica. According to Siculus, there were three gods named Dionysus, this one having been born on Crete of parents Zeus and Persephone. He was an agricultural innovator of mythical proportions, having invented the plough. He was the first to cultivate vines and manufacture wine. For unspecified reasons, Dionysus took it upon himself to create two islands, "...near Crete in the twin gulfs (Didymoi Kolpoi)..."

== Environment ==
The Dionysades are uninhabited. They were, however, probably once a place of worship of the ancient Greek god Dionysus. Archaeologists have found artifacts on this island group—from ancient and early Christian eras—indicating that the islands may have been inhabited in the past. Today, the islands are part of an environmentally protected area with many rare plants and animals. The islets have been recognised as an Important Bird Area (IBA) by BirdLife International because they support breeding populations of Scopoli'ss and Yelkouan shearwaters, and Eleonora's falcons, as well as lesser kestrels on passage migration.

== Geography ==
The noted German cartographer, Heinrich Kiepert, in his depiction of Crete, committed the space south of the Dionysades to the label Didymoi Kolpoi. In his view the bay extended between Cape Sidero and Cape Agios Ioannis, a distance of about 48.23 km (29.97 mi). The two kolpoi would be Mirabello and Sitia bays. As these kolpoi are not mentioned anywhere else, there is no independent confirmation that they are two of today's Dionysades—those probably being the largest and most visible—Gianysada and Dragonada. To assume that they are, one must find the twin kolpoi in their vicinity. Most maps before the 19th century do not portray the kolpoi very accurately, either by number, location, or proportion of bays and headlands. To definitively say which can be considered these twin bays is impossible.

A map by Nicolas Sanson, cartographer to Louis XIII of France, produced an early map—dated 1651 (see maps below)—showing the Didymi Seu Gemelli Sinus, the "Didymi or Twin Bays." Sanson knew so little of Crete that he could only produce a speculative version that can scarcely be matched to the coastline at all. Whether he was trying to fit Diogenes' statement into an unknown geography or had access to information now lost cannot be ascertained.

=== Gianysada ===
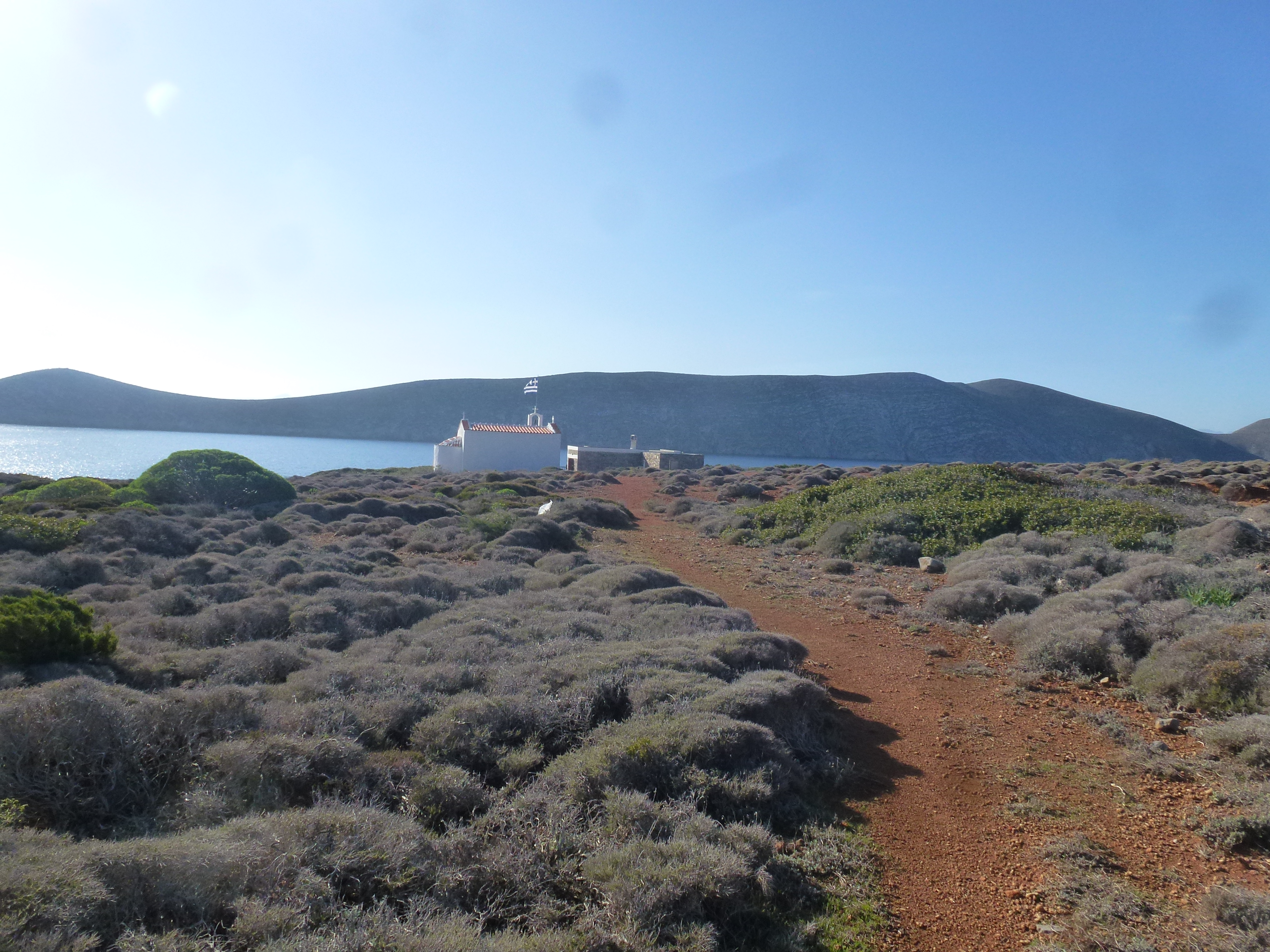
The foreground is the south coast of Dragonada; view from across the channel to the north coast of Gianysada

Gianysada (Greek: Γιανυσάδα, also Γιαννισάδα - Giannisada; Janisada) is the southernmost island of the Dionysades group.

=== Dragonada ===
Dragonada (Greek: Δραγονάδα) (also known as Dragonara),

=== Paximada ===
Paximada (Greek: Παξιμάδα, "rusk") is the northernmost island of the Dionysades. Not to be confused with Paximadia Island.

=== Paximadaki ===
Paximadaki (Greek: Παξιμαδάκι; also "little Paximada") is a reef hugging the north coast of Dragonada. It is located close to Sitia on the northeast coast of Crete. Paximadaki is not marked on the admiralty chart below.

== Geology ==
The island group is part of the Cretan Islands archipelagoes. They are on an off-ridge of the submarine range to which Crete belongs, the Hellenic arc, the curved southern border of the Aegean Sea from the Peloponnesos to Rhodes. To the south, the Hellenic Trench, as much as 4,000 m (13,000 ft) deep, borders the Hellenic arc, while to the north the Sea of Crete, a deep adjunct of the Aegean Sea, descends as deep as 1,000 m (3,300 ft). In contrast to these deep water environments, the coastal shelf of Crete is shallow and dotted with reefs, making it dangerous for ships. The Dionysades lie in shallow water. To the north of them the coast drops off.

=== Hydrology ===
A British admiralty charts of the late 19th century, plotting the soundings assiduously and with some danger taken by HMS Spitfire (a paddle gunboat) in 1852, published a visual account of the coastal shelf around Crete (see maps below). The shelf roughly follows the coastline, but further out. A dotted line marks the virtual outer border, taken to be the 100 fathoms (600 ft) line, developed by intuitively curve-fitting on the outermost soundings. Beyond there the bottom drops into the deeps and soundings were not possible then. Because of subsequent revisions the chart should not be used for any current navigation, but it does give an approximate view of the shallows.

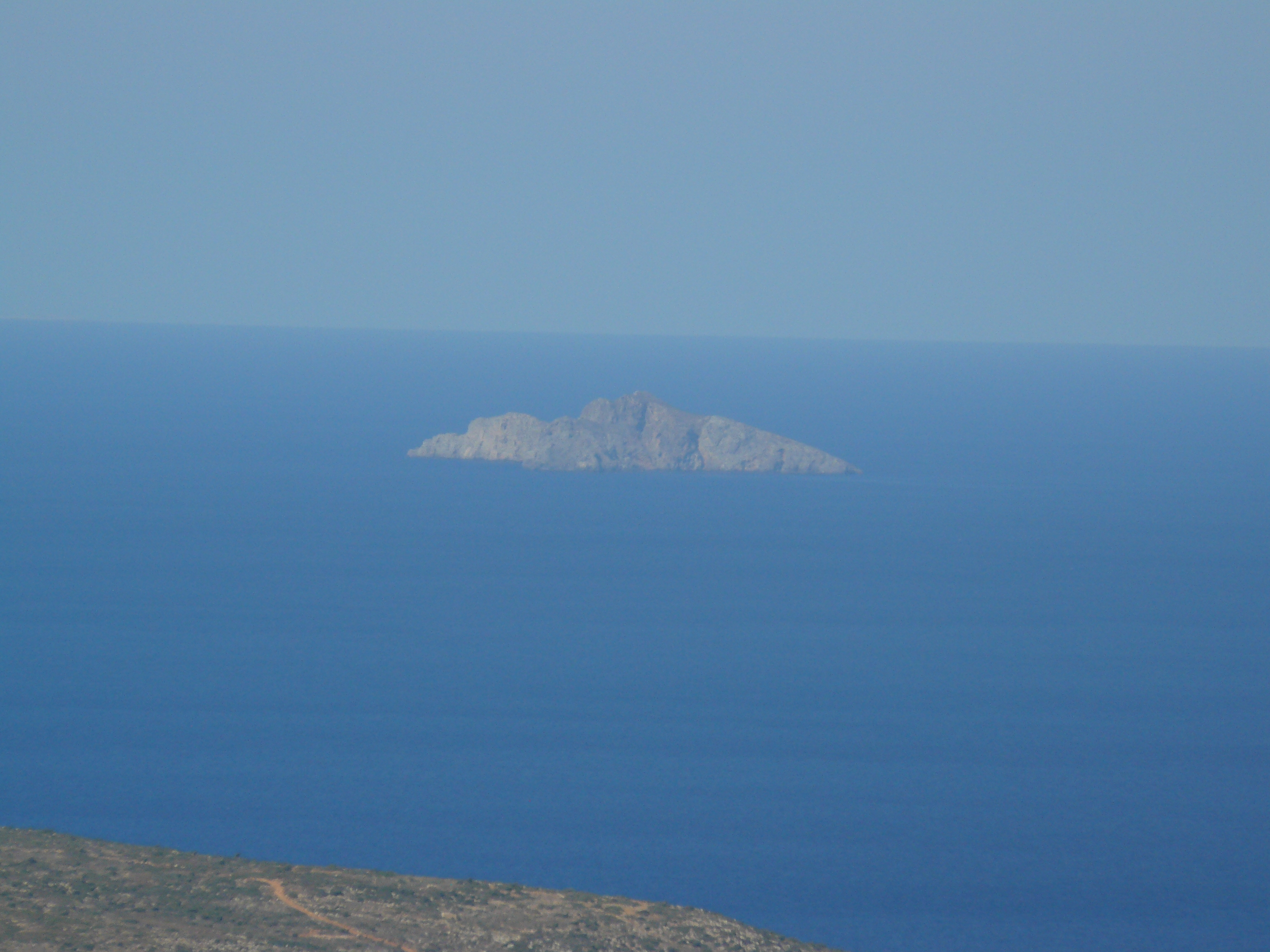
Paximada

Soundings immediately off the south of Yanisada are around 15 fathoms (90 ft), dropping off to 100 fathoms. The channel between Yanisada and the mainland is no deeper than 140 fathoms (840 ft). It rises to 100 fathoms again closer to the mainland, to comprise reefs around Sidero: Spitfire Rock, Pinnacle Rock, and others. Between Yanisada and Dragonada is about 35 fathoms (210 ft), and between the latter and Paximada, 95 fathoms (570 ft). North of Paximada are a few deeper, such as 190 fathoms (1,140 ft), before the deep.

The chart depicts an uneven and rugged coastline, although its coves and headlands would probably not stand close GPS scrutiny. There are no geometric lines; the depths are sinuous and full of rocks projecting to the surface. There are only a few localities on the coast of Crete where ocean-going vessels have a clear and predictable road into a harbor. Around the Dionysades those were Sitia, and on the other side of Cape Sidero, Itanos, but the latter has been derelict for many centuries, with the harbor filled in to become a beach.

== Reference maps ==
| Map by Nicolas Sanson, "King's Geographer" (Louis XIII, France), 1651. | British admiralty chart. The latest date on the chart is 1895. The soundings were collected by HMS Spitfire in 1852. |

NOTE: Admiralty chart soundings are in fathoms; elevations are in feet.

== See also ==
- List of islands of Greece
