= List of non-marine molluscs of Jordan =

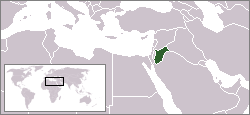
Location of Jordan

The non-marine mollusks of Jordan are a part of the fauna of Jordan. That country is land-locked and therefore it has no marine molluscs, only land and freshwater species, including snails, slugs, freshwater clams and freshwater mussels. There are ?? species of gastropods (19 species of freshwater gastropods, ?? species of land gastropods) and ?? species of freshwater bivalves living in the wild.

Summary table of number of species

| | Jordan |
|---|---|
| freshwater gastropods | 17 + 2 = 19 |
| land gastropods | ?? |
| gastropods altogether | ??? |
| bivalves | ?? |
| molluscs altogether | ??? |

== Freshwater gastropods ==
Neritidae

- Theodoxus jordani (Sowerby, 1844)
- Theodoxus macrii (Sowerby, 1844)

Bithyniidae

- Bithynia philalensis (Conrad, 1852)

Valvatidae

- Valvata saulcyi Bourguignat, 1853

Cochliopidae

- Eupaludestrina contempta (Dautzenberg, 1894)
- Eupaludestrina longiscata (Bourguignat, 1856)
- Pyrgophorus coronatus (L. Pfeiffer, 1840)- non-indigenous

Hydrobiidae

- Globuliana gaillardotii (Bourguignat, 1856)
- Pseudamnicola solitaria Tchernov, 1971

Thiaridae

- Melanoides tuberculata (O. F. Müller, 1774)
- Mieniplotia scabra (O. F. Müller, 1774) - non-indigenous

Melanopsidae

- Melanopsis ammonis Tristram, 1865
- Melanopsis buccinoidea Olivier, 1801
- Melanopsis costata (Olivier, 1804)
  - Melanopsis costata jordanica J. R. Roth, 1839
  - Melanopsis costata lampra Bourguignat, 1884
  - Melanopsis costata obliqua Bourguignat, 1884
- Melanopsis saulcyi Bourguignat, 1853

Lymnaeidae

- Galba truncatula (O. F. Müller, 1774)
- Radix natalensis (Krauss, 1848)

Physidae

- Physa acuta (Draparnaud, 1805)

Planorbidae

- Bulinus truncatus (Audouin, 1827)
- Gyraulus piscinarum (Bourguignat, 1852)
- Planorbis planorbis (Linnaeus, 1758)

== Land gastropods ==
Pupillidae

- Pupoides coenopictus (T. Hutton, 1834)

Pyramidulidae

- Pyramidula rupestris (Draparnaud, 1801)

Chondrinidae

- Granopupa granum (Draparnaud, 1801)
- Rupestrella rhodia (J. R. Roth, 1839)

Truncatellidae

- Truncatellina haasi Venmans, 1957

Enidae

- Buliminus diminutus (Mousson, 1861)
- Buliminus jordani (Charpentier, 1847)
- Buliminus labrosus (Olivier, 1804)
- Buliminus marsabensis Westerlund, 1887
- Buliminus negevensis Heller, 1970
- Buliminus sinaiensis Heller, 1970
- Euchondrus chondriformis (Mousson, 1861)
- Euchondrus michonii (Bourguignat, 1853)
- Euchondrus saulcyi (Bourguignat, 1852)
- Euchondrus septemdentatus (J. R. Roth, 1839)
- Paramastus episomus (Bourguignat, 1857)
- Pene bulimoides (L. Pfeiffer, 1842)

Ferussaciidae

- Calaxis hierosolymarum (J. R. Roth, 1855)
- Cecilioides acicula (O. F. Müller, 1774)
- Cecilioides genezarethensis Forcart, 1981
- Cecilioides tumulorum (Bourguignat, 1856)

Achatinidae

- Rumina decollata (Linnaeus, 1758)

Punctidae

- Paralaoma servilis (Shuttleworth, 1852)

Oxychilidae

- Eopolita protensa jebusitica (J. R. Roth, 1855)
- Oxychilus renanianus (Pallary, 1939)

Pristilomatidae

- Vitrea contracta (Westerlund, 1871)

Limacidae

- Gigantomilax cecconii (Simroth, 1906)

Geomitridae

- Cochlicella acuta (O. F. Müller, 1774)
- Xerocrassa langloisiana (Bourguignat, 1853)
- Xerocrassa seetzeni (L. Pfeiffer, 1847)
- Xerocrassa simulata (Ehrenberg, 1831)
- Xerocrassa tuberculosa (Conrad, 1852)
- Xeropicta krynickii (Krynicki, 1833)

Helicidae

- Eobania vermiculata (O. F. Müller, 1774) - non-indigenous
- Helix engaddensis Bourguignat, 1852
- Levantina spiriplana (Olivier, 1801)
  - Levantina spiriplana caesareana (Mousson, 1854)
  - Levantina spiriplana spiriplana (Olivier, 1801)

Hygromiidae

- Monacha crispulata (Mousson, 1861)
- Monacha obstructa (L. Pfeiffer, 1842)

Sphincterochilidae

- Sphincterochila cariosa (Olivier, 1804)
- Sphincterochila fimbriata (Bourguignat, 1852)
- Sphincterochila prophetarum (Bourguignat, 1852)
- Sphincterochila zonata (Bourguignat, 1853)
  - Sphincterochila zonata filia (Mousson, 1861)
  - Sphincterochila zonata zonata (Bourguignat, 1853)

== Freshwater bivalves ==
Sphaeriidae

- Euglesa casertana (Poli, 1791)
- Odhneripisidium annandalei (Prashad, 1925)

== See also ==
- Wildlife of Jordan

Lists of non-marine molluscs of surrounding countries:

- List of non-marine molluscs of Israel
- List of non-marine molluscs of Syria
- List of non-marine molluscs of Iraq
- List of non-marine molluscs of Saudi Arabia
