= List of non-marine molluscs of Israel =

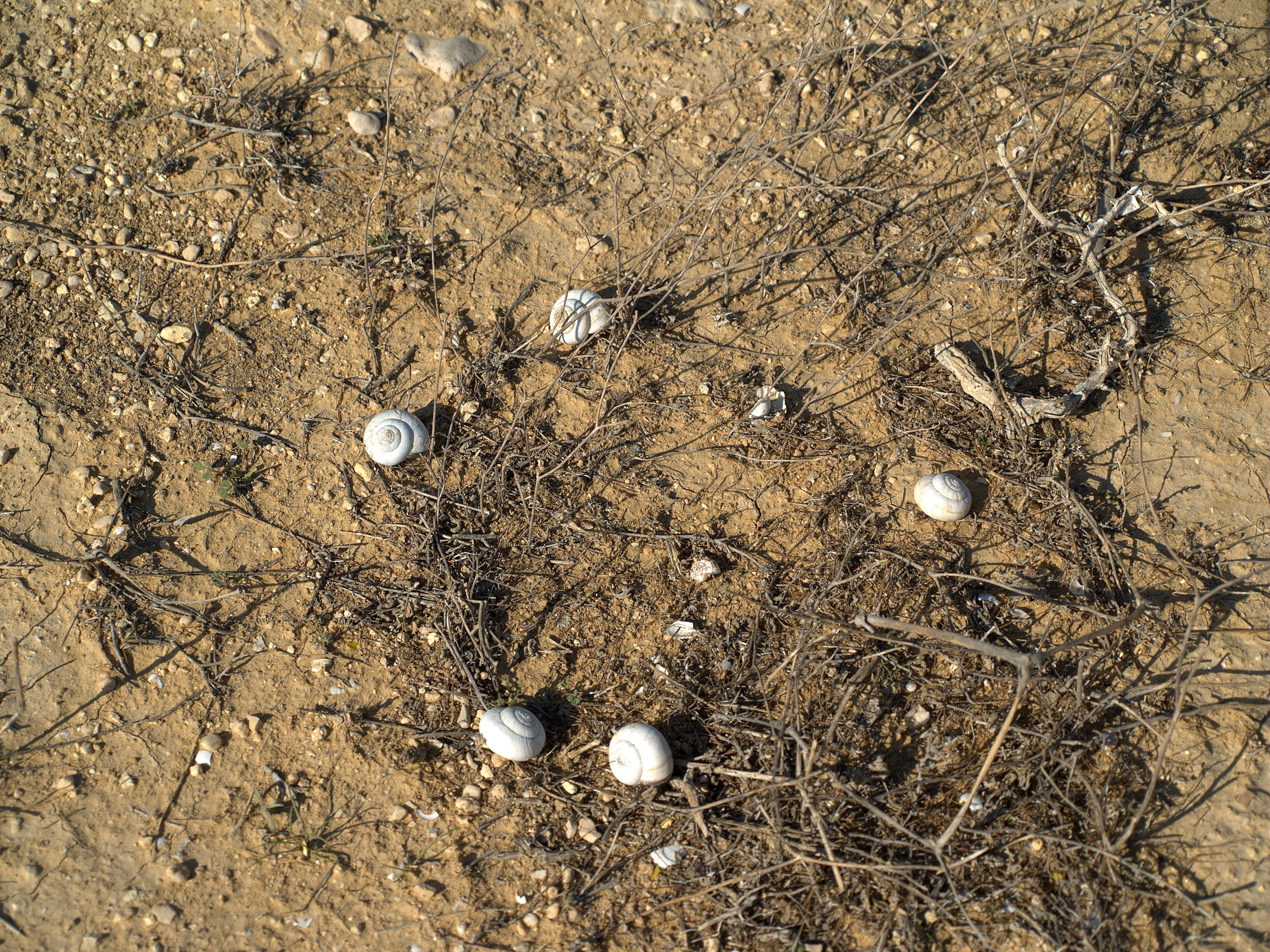
Land snail shells in the Negev

Non-marine molluscs of Israel are a part of the molluscan fauna of Israel. A number of species of non-marine molluscs are found in the wild in Israel. In addition, a number of gastropod species are reared in captivity in greenhouses, aquaria and terraria.

== Land gastropods ==
Land gastropods in Israel include

Aciculidae

- Acicula palaestinensis Forcart, 1981

Pomatiidae

- Pomatias glaucus (G. B. Sowerby II, 1843) (usually under the synonymous name Pomatias olivieri (Charpentier, 1847))

Ellobiidae

- Carychium minimum O. F. Müller, 1774

Succineidae

- Novisuccinea hortensis (Reinhardt, 1877) - non-indigenous
- Novisuccinea ovalis (Say, 1817) - non-indigenous
- Oxyloma elegans (Risso, 1826)

Chondrinidae

- Granopupa granum (Draparnaud, 1801)
- Rupestrella rhodia (J. R. Roth, 1839)

Gastrocoptidae

- Gastrocopta cf. pellucida (L. Pfeiffer, 1841) - non-indigenous
- Gastrocopta procera (A. Gould, 1840) - non-indigenous

Lauriidae

- Lauria cylindracea (Da Costa, 1778)

Orculidae

- Orculella sirianocoriensis (Mousson, 1854)
- Pilorcula raymondi (Bourguignat, 1863)

Pleurodiscidae

- Pleurodiscus balmei (Potiez & Michaud, 1838) (under the synonymous name Pleurodiscus erdelii (J. R. Roth, 1839))

Pupillidae

- Pupoides coenopictus (T. Hutton, 1834)

Pyramidulidae

- Pyramidula rupestris (also under the name Pyramidula hierosolymitana (Bourguignat, 1852))

Truncatellinidae

- Truncatellina haasi Venmans, 1957

Valloniidae

- Vallonia costata (O. F. Müller, 1774) - non-indigenous
- Vallonia excentrica Sterki, 1893 - non-indigenous
- Vallonia costata (O. F. Müller, 1774) - non-indigenous

Enidae

- Buliminus alepensis (L. Pfeiffer, 1841)
- Buliminus diminutus (Mousson, 1861)
- Buliminus glabratus (Mousson, 1861)
- Buliminus jordani (Charpentier, 1847)
- Buliminus labrosus labrosus (Olivier, 1804)
- Buliminus lamprostatus (Bourguignat, 1876)
- Buliminus negevensis Heller, 1970
- Buliminus sinaiensis Heller, 1970
- Buliminus therinus (Bourguignat, 1876)
- Euchondrus albulus (Mousson, 1861)
- Euchondrus chondriformis (Mousson, 1861)
- Euchondrus desertorum Rochanaburananda, 1981
- Euchondrus haasi Forcart, 1981
- Euchondrus michonii (Bourguignat, 1853) (including Euchondrus ledereri (L. Pfeiffer, 1868))
- Euchondrus pseudovularis Forcart, 1981
- Euchondrus ramonensis (Granot, 1988) - endemic
- Euchondrus saulcyi (Bourguignat, 1852)
- Euchondrus septemdentatus (Roth, 1839)
- Euchondrus sulcidens (Mousson, 1861)
- Paramastus episomus (Bourguignat, 1857)
- Pene bulimoides (L. Pfeiffer, 1842)
- Pene galilaea Heller, 1972 - endemic
- Pene kotschyi (L. Pfeiffer, 1854)
- Turanena benjamitica (Benson, 1859)
- Turanena hermonensis (Forcart, 1981)

Clausiliidae

- Cristataria elonensis (G. Haas, 1951)
- Cristataria forcarti H. Nordsieck, 1971
- Cristataria genezarethana (Tristram, 1865)
- Cristataria haasi H. Nordsieck, 1971
  - Cristataria haasi haasi H. Nordsieck, 1971
  - Cristataria haasi kharbatensis H. Nordsieck, 1971
- Cristataria hermonensis H. Nordsieck, 1977
- Cristataria petrboki (Pallary, 1939)
- Elia moesta (Rossmässler, 1839)
  - Elia moesta georgi Forcart, 1975
  - Elia moesta moesta (Rossmässler, 1839) - non-indigenous

Ferussaciidae

- Calaxis gracilis Forcart, 1981
- Calaxis hierosolymarum (J. R. Roth, 1855)
- Calaxis rothi (Bourguignat, 1864)
- Cecilioides acicula (O. F. Müller, 1774)
- Cecilioides genezarethensis Forcart, 1981
- Cecilioides tumulorum (Bourguignat, 1856) (under the synonymous name Cecilioides judaica (Mousson, 1861))
- Hohenwartiana hohenwarti (Rossmässler, 1839)

Achatinidae

- Achatina fulica Bowdich, 1822 - non-indigenous
- Lamellaxis clavulinus (Potiez & Michaud, 1838) - non-indigenous
- Rumina decollata (Linnaeus, 1758) - non-indigenous
- Rumina saharica Pallary, 1901 - non-indigenous

Helicodiscidae

- Lucilla scintilla (Lowe, 1852) - non-indigenous

Punctidae

- Paralaoma servilis (Shuttleworth, 1852)
- Punctum pygmaeum (Draparnaud, 1801)

Euconulidae

- Euconulus alderi (Gray, 1840) (under the synonymous name Euconulus praticola (Reinhardt, 1883)

Gastrodontidae

- Zonitoides arboreus (Say, 1816) - non-indigenous
- Zonitoides nitidus (O. F. Müller, 1774) - non-indigenous

Pristilomatidae

- Hawaiia minuscula (A. Binney, 1841) - non-indigenous
- Vitrea contracta (Westerlund, 1871)

Oxychilidae

- Eopolita protensa jebusitica (Roth, 1855)
- Libania saulcyi (Bourguignat, 1852)
- Oxychilus camelinus (Bourguignat, 1852)
- Oxychilus renanianus (Pallary, 1939)
- Oxychilus translucidus (Mortillet, 1854) - non-indigenous

Milacidae

- Milax barypus Bourguignat, 1866

Limacidae

- Gigantomilax cecconii (Simroth, 1906)
- Gigantomilax eustrictus (Bourguignat, 1866)
- Lehmannia valentiana (de Férussac, 1822) - non-indigenous
- Limacus flavus (Linnaeus, 1758)

Agriolimacidae

- Deroceras berytensis (Bourguignat, 1852)
- Deroceras laeve (O. F. Müller, 1774) - non-indigenous
- Deroceras libanoticum (Pollonera, 1909)
- Deroceras reticulatum (O. F. Müller, 1774) - non-indigenous

Geomitridae

- Cochlicella acuta (O. F. Müller, 1774)
- Cochlicella barbara (Linnaeus, 1758) - non-indigenous
- Microxeromagna lowei (Potiez & Michaud, 1838)
- Xerocrassa davidiana (Bourguignat, 1863)
- Xerocrassa erkelii (Kobelt, 1878)
- Xerocrassa fourtaui (Pallary, 1902)
- Xerocrassa helleri (Forcart, 1976)
- Xerocrassa langloisiana (Bourguignat, 1853)
- Xerocrassa meda (Porro, 1840) - non-indigenous
- Xerocrassa picardi (F. Haas, 1933)
- Xerocrassa pseudojacosta (Forcart, 1976)
- Xerocrassa seetzeni (L. Pfeiffer, 1847)
- Xerocrassa simulata (Ehrenberg, 1831)
- Xerocrassa tuberculosa (Conrad, 1852)
- Xerocrassa zviae Mienis, 2017
- Xeropicta carmelensis Forcart, 1976
- Xeropicta ilanae Forcart, 1981
- Xeropicta krynickii (Krynicki, 1833) (often under the synonymous names X. vestalis (L. Pfeiffer, 1841) or X.vestalis joppensis (Schmidt, 1855))
- Xeropicta zeevbari Mienis & Rittner, 2020
- Xerotricha apicina (Lamarck, 1822)
- Xerotricha conspurcata (Draparnaud, 1801) - non-indigenous

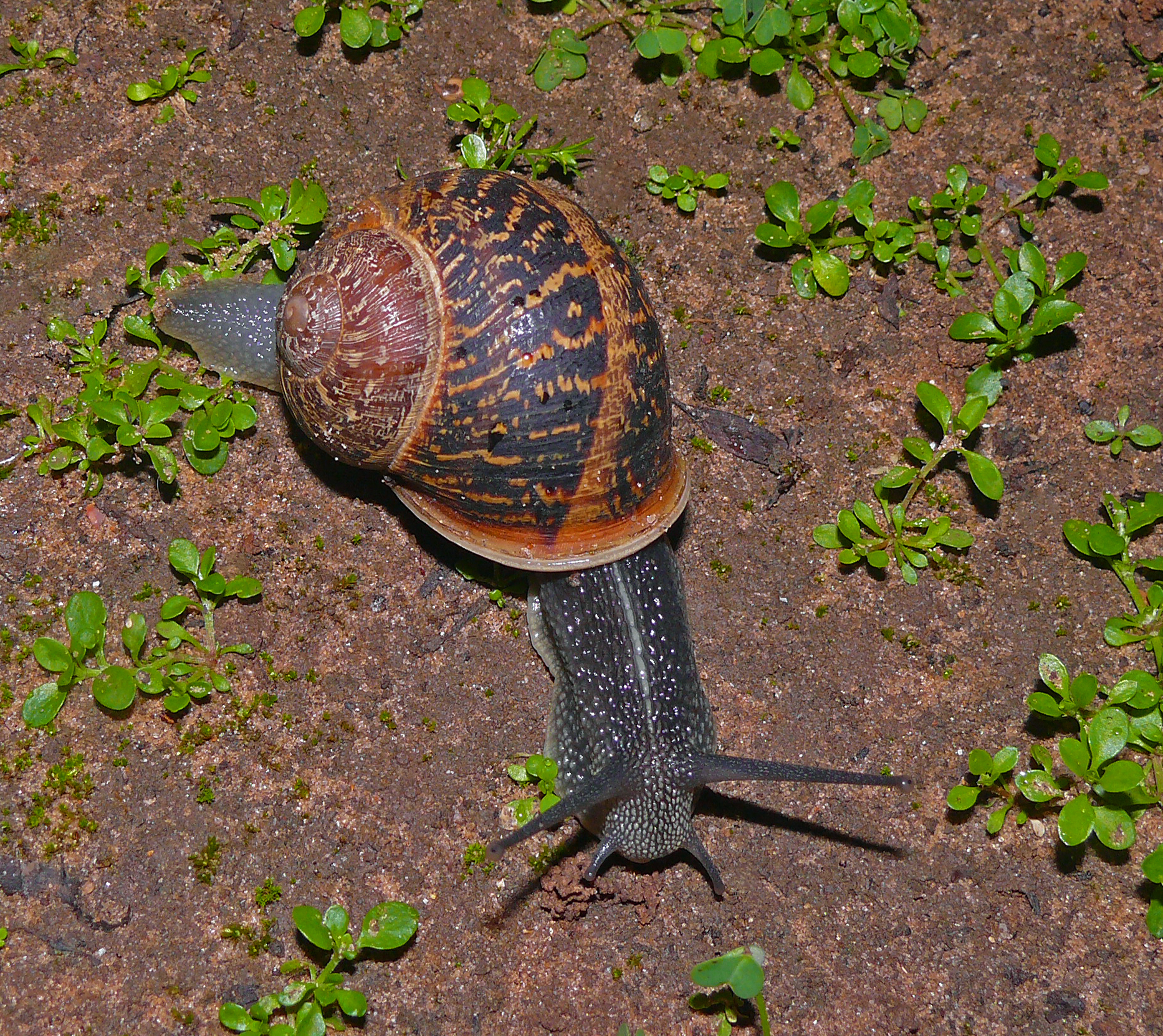
Cornu aspersum is non-indigenous in Israel

Helicidae

- Cornu aspersum (O. F. Müller, 1774) - non-indigenous
- Eobania vermiculata (O. F. Müller, 1774)
- Eremina desertorum (Forsskål, 1775)
- Eremina kobelti (Westerlund, 1889)
- Helix engaddensis Bourguignat, 1852 (including Helix prasinata Roth, 1855)
- Helix pachya Bourguignat, 1860 (often under the synonymous name Helix texta auct.)
- Levantina spiriplana (Olivier, 1801)
  - Levantina spiriplana caesareana (Mousson, 1854)
  - Levantina spiriplana spiriplana (Olivier, 1801) (including Levantina hierosolyma (Mousson, 1854))
- Theba pisana (O. F. Müller, 1774)

Hygromiidae

- Metafruticicola berytensis (L. Pfeiffer, 1841) (including Metafruticicola fourousi (Bourguignat, 1863))
- Metafruticicola hermonensis Forcart, 1981
- Monacha bari Forcart, 1981
- Monacha crispulata (Mousson, 1861)
- Monacha obstructa (Férussac, 1821)
- Monacha syriaca (Ehrenberg, 1831)

Sphincterochilidae

- Sphincterochila cariosa (Olivier, 1804)
- Sphincterochila fimbriata (Bourguignat, 1852)
- Sphincterochila prophetarum (Bourguignat, 1852)
- Sphincterochila zonata (Bourguignat, 1853)
  - Sphincterochila zonata filia (Mousson, 1861)
  - Sphincterochila zonata zonata (Bourguignat, 1853) (including Sphincterochila boissieri (Charpentier, 1847)).

Trissexodontidae

- Caracollina lenticula (Michaud, 1831)

== See also ==
- Wildlife of Israel
