= Sphincterochila insularis =

Scientific classification
- Kingdom: Animalia
- Phylum: Mollusca
- Class: Gastropoda
- Order: Stylommatophora
- Family: Sphincterochilidae
- Genus: Sphincterochila
- Species: S. insularis

Binomial name
- Sphincterochila insularis (Boettger, 1894)

Synonyms
- Leucochroa candidissima var. insularis Boettger, 1894

Species of gastropod

Sphincterochila insularis is a species of air-breathing land snail, a terrestrial pulmonate gastropod mollusk in the family Sphincterochilidae.

== Distribution ==
This species occurs on Antikythera island in Greece.
