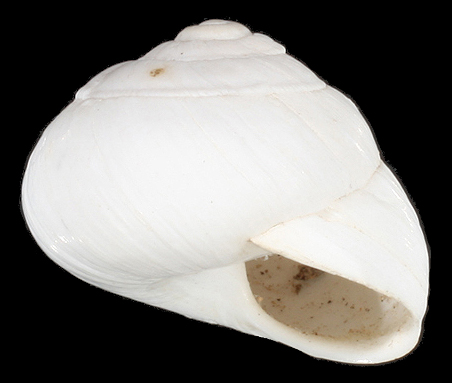
- Apertural view of the shell of Sphincterochila baetica.

Scientific classification
- Domain: Eukaryota
- Kingdom: Animalia
- Phylum: Mollusca
- Class: Gastropoda
- Order: Stylommatophora
- Family: Sphincterochilidae
- Genus: Sphincterochila
- Species: S. baetica

Binomial name
- Sphincterochila baetica (Rossmässler, 1854)

= Sphincterochila baetica =

Species of gastropod

Sphincterochila baetica is a species of air-breathing land snail, a terrestrial pulmonate gastropod mollusk in the family Sphincterochilidae.

== Distribution ==
This species occurs in Spain, Morocco, and Algeria.

== Shell description ==
The shell is globose, solid, whitish ash-color. The shell has 5 whorls which are very slowly increasing, the upper ones carious-rugulose, the penultimate about as broad as the last. The last whorl is more or less angulated on the periphery, and rounded in front.

The aperture is widely lunate, angulated exteriorly. The peristome is internally sublabiate.

The width of the shell is 25 mm.

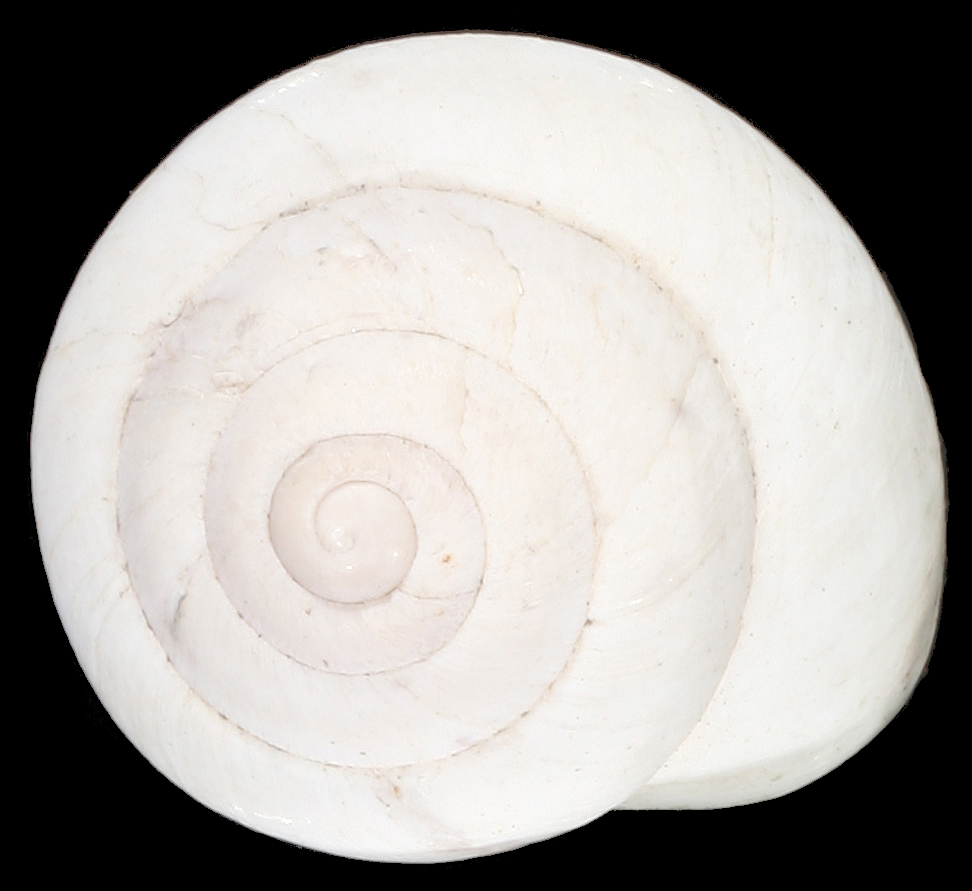
Apical view of the shell of Sphincterochila baetica.

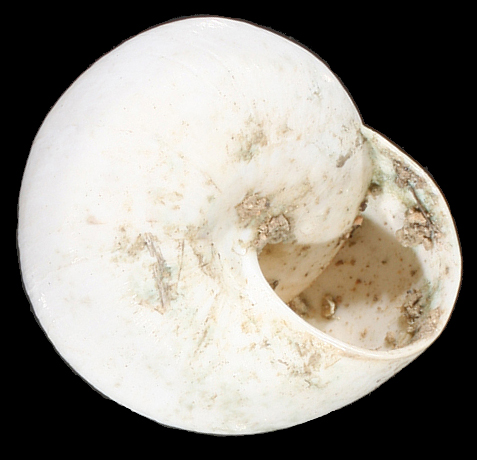
Basal view of the shell ofSphincterochila baetica.
