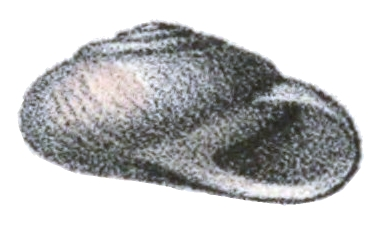
- Drawing showing an apertural view of a shell of Sphincterochila prophetarum.

Scientific classification
- Kingdom: Animalia
- Phylum: Mollusca
- Class: Gastropoda
- Order: Stylommatophora
- Family: Sphincterochilidae
- Genus: Sphincterochila
- Species: S. prophetarum

Binomial name
- Sphincterochila prophetarum (Bourguignat, 1852)

Synonyms
- Helix Prophetarum Bourguignat, 1852

= Sphincterochila prophetarum =

Species of gastropod

Sphincterochila prophetarum is a species of air-breathing land snail, a terrestrial pulmonate gastropod mollusk in the family Sphincterochilidae.

== Distribution ==
The species occurs in Egypt (northeastern Egypt and Sinai Peninsula), southern Israel (Northern Negev), Jordan, and in the coastal mountains of western Saudi Arabia.

== Shell description ==
The shell is perforate, depressed, solid, stridulate, cretaceous, white and with suture impressed. The shell has 4½ flattened or slightly convex whorls. The last whorl is very obsoletely angulated, rounded in front, shortly and suddenly deflected.

The width of the shell is 16 mm.
