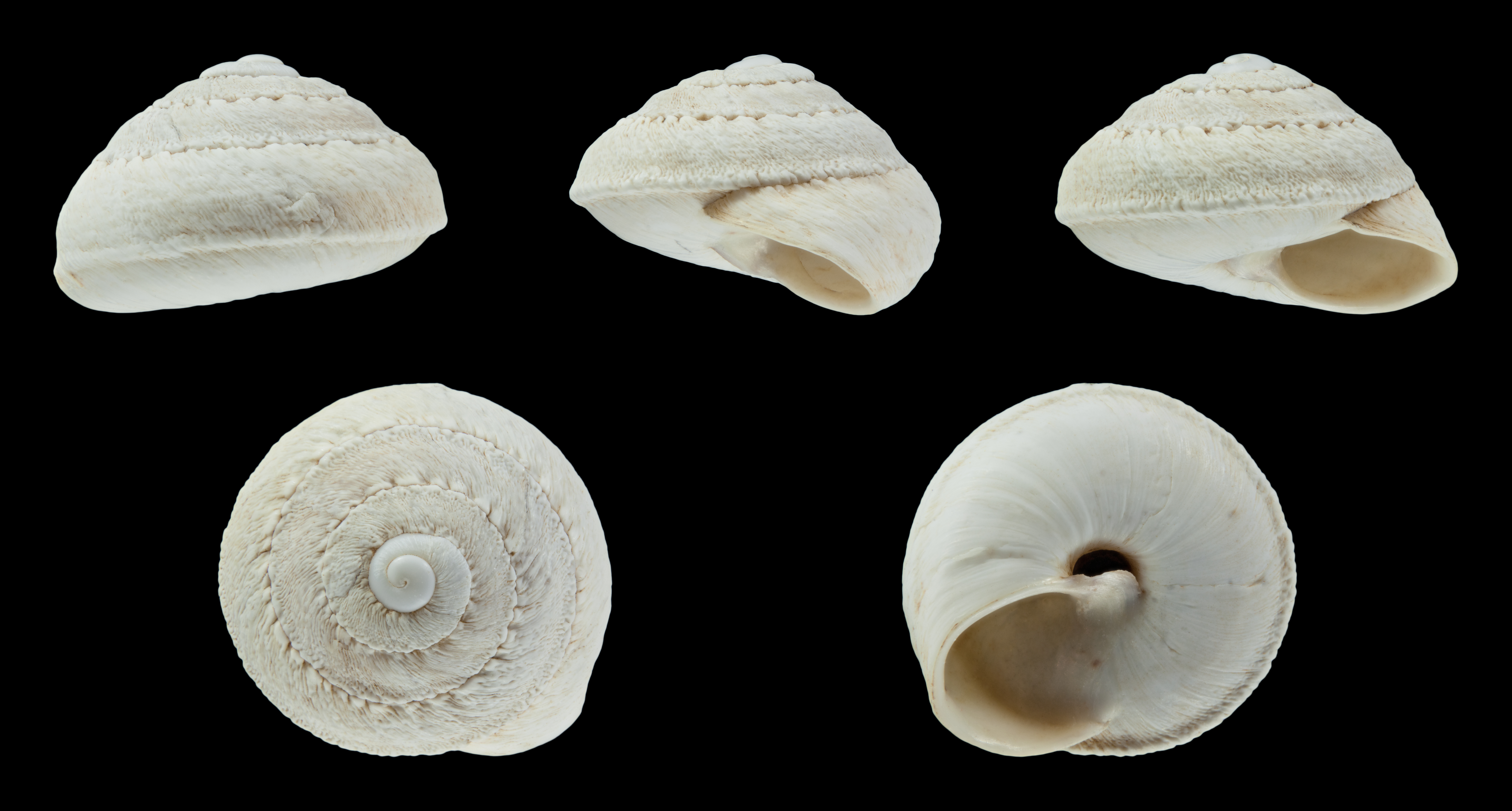
- Five views of a shell of Sphincterochila cariosula.

Scientific classification
- Kingdom: Animalia
- Phylum: Mollusca
- Class: Gastropoda
- Order: Stylommatophora
- Family: Sphincterochilidae
- Genus: Sphincterochila
- Species: S. cariosula

Binomial name
- Sphincterochila cariosula (Michaud, 1833)

Synonyms
- Helix cariosula Michaud, 1833; Sphincterochila (Cariosula) cariosula (Michaud, 1833) ·

= Sphincterochila cariosula =

Species of gastropod

Sphincterochila cariosula is a species of air-breathing land snail, a terrestrial pulmonate gastropod mollusc in the family Sphincterochilidae.

== Subspecies ==
- Sphincterochila cariosula cariosula (Michaud, 1833)
- Sphincterochila cariosula hispanica (Westerlund, 1891) - synonym Helix hispanica. The subspecies is distributed in Spain.

== Distribution ==
The indigenous distribution of the species is Algeria. The species was introduced to Vélez-Málaga in southern Spain and to western Mallorca in historical times.

== Shell description ==
The shell is subimperforate, carinate, globosely convex above, carious, somewhat flattened below, soiled white, with a tubercularly eroded filiform sutural carina. The shell has 5 somewhat flattened whorls. The upper margin of the aperture is subdeflected. The width of the shell is 16–19 mm and the height is 11–15 mm.

== Habitat ==
Sphincterochila cariosula occurs in scrublands and in semideserts.
