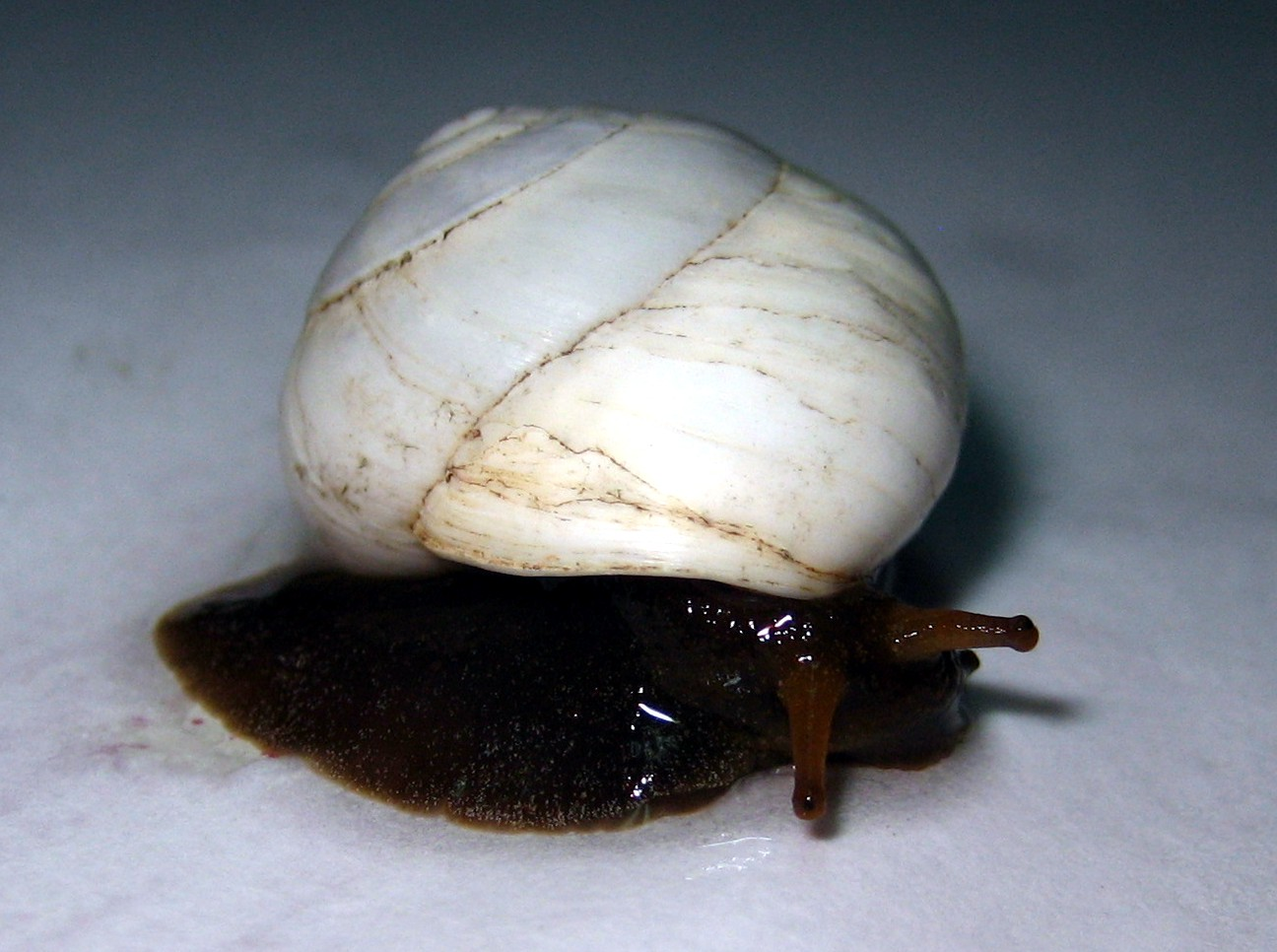
- A lateral view of a live individual of Sphincterochila candidissima
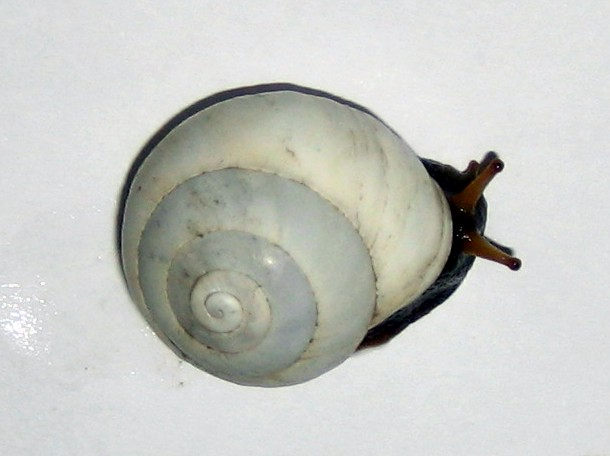
- A dorsal view of a live Sphincterochila candidissima

Scientific classification
- Kingdom: Animalia
- Phylum: Mollusca
- Class: Gastropoda
- Order: Stylommatophora
- Infraorder: Helicoidei
- Superfamily: Helicoidea
- Family: Sphincterochilidae
- Genus: Sphincterochila; Ancey, 1887

Type species
- Helix boissieri Charpentier, 1847

Synonyms
- Albea Pallary, 1910; Albea (Cariosula) Pallary, 1910; Albea (Sphincterochila) Ancey, 1887; Calcarina Moquin-Tandon, 1848; Candidissima Pallary, 1910; Leucochroa (Calcarina) Moquin-Tandon, 1848; Leucochroa (Sphincterochila) Ancey, 1887; Mima Westerlund, 1886; Rima Pallary, 1910; Sphincterochila (Albea) Pallary, 1910· accepted, alternate representation; Sphincterochila (Cariosula) Pallary, 1910· accepted, alternate representation; Sphincterochila (Cerigottella) E. Gittenberger, 1993· accepted, alternate representation; Sphincterochila (Rima) Pallary, 1910 (junior synonym); Sphincterochila (Sphincterochila) Ancey, 1887 accepted, alternate representation; Sphincterochila (Zilchena) Forcart, 1972· accepted, alternate representation

= Sphincterochila =

Genus of gastropods

Sphincterochila is a genus of air-breathing land snails, terrestrial pulmonate gastropod molluscs in the family Sphincterochilidae.

Sphincterochila is the type genus of the family Sphincterochilidae.

Species in the genus Sphincterochila are arid-adapted (adapted to living in very dry conditions).

== Species ==
Species in the genus Sphincterochila include:

- Sphincterochila baetica (Rossmässler, 1854)
- † Sphincterochila baumbergeri (Wenz, 1936)
- Sphincterochila candidissima (Draparnaud, 1801)
- Sphincterochila cariosa (Olivier, 1801) – shell description
- Sphincterochila cariosula (Michaud, 1833)
- Sphincterochila chionudiscus (Boettger, 1874)
- Sphincterochila cyrenaica Sturany, 1908
  - Sphincterochila debeauxi elevata Pallary, 1910
- Sphincterochila fimbriata (Bourguignat, 1852)
- Sphincterochila illicita (Mousson, 1874)
- Sphincterochila insularis (Boettger, 1894)
- † Sphincterochila jodoti Rey, 1974
- Sphincterochila maroccana Pallary, 1917
  - Sphincterochila maroccana conica Pallary, 1926
  - Sphincterochila maroccana depressa Pallary, 1926
  - Sphincterochila maroccana major Pallary, 1926
  - Sphincterochila maroccana minor Pallary, 1926
  - Sphincterochila maroccana tananensis Pallary, 1917
- Sphincterochila mixta Kaltenbach, 1950
- Sphincterochila pagodula (Rutland, 1878)
  - Sphincterochila pagodula umbilicata (Ruttland, 1878)
- Sphincterochila pardoi Llabador, 1950
- Sphincterochila prophetarum (Bourguignat, 1852)
- Sphincterochila tunetana (Pfeiffer, 1850)
- Sphincterochila zonata (Bourguignat, 1853)

Synonyms

- Sphincterochila aharonii (Kobelt, 1913): synonym of Leucochroa aharonii Kobelt, 1913 (taxon inquirendum)
- Sphincterochila boissieri (Charpentier, 1847) – type species: synonym of Sphincterochila zonata zonata (Bourguignat, 1853)
- Sphincterochila corrugata Pallary, 1917: synonym of Albea mayrani var. corrugata Pallary, 1917 (taxon inquirendum)
- Sphincterochila debeauxi (Kobelt, 1881): synonym of Leucochroa debeauxi Kobelt, 1881 (taxon inquirendum)
- Sphincterochila marteli (Pallary, 1918): synonym of Albea marteli Pallary, 1918 (taxon inquirendum)
- Sphincterochila mayrani (Gassies, 1856): synonym of Albea mayrani (Gassies, 1856) (taxon inquirendum)
  - Sphincterochila mayrani turrita (Gassies, 1856)
- Sphincterochila roumensiana (Pallary, 1911): synonym of Albea roumensiana Pallary, 1918 (taxon inquirednum)

Comparison of apertural views of shells of five Sphincterochila species:

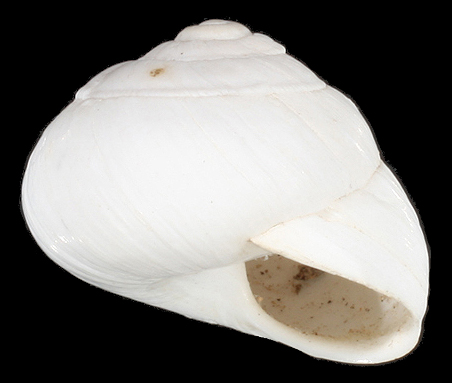
Sphincterochila baetica

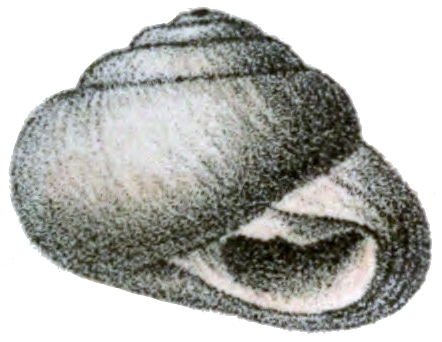
Sphincterochila boissieri

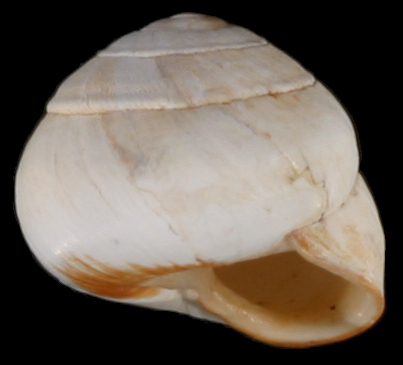
Sphincterochila candidissima

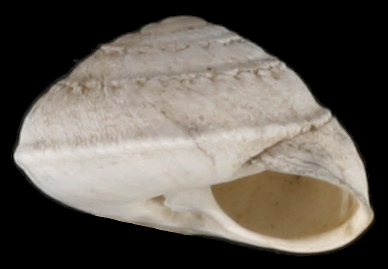
Sphincterochila cariosula

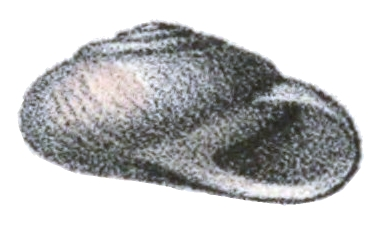
Sphincterochila prophetarum
