= Xerocrassa pseudojacosta =

Conservation status
- Critically Endangered (IUCN 2.3)

Scientific classification
- Domain: Eukaryota
- Kingdom: Animalia
- Phylum: Mollusca
- Class: Gastropoda
- Order: Stylommatophora
- Family: Geomitridae
- Genus: Xerocrassa
- Species: X. pseudojacosta

Binomial name
- Xerocrassa pseudojacosta Forcart, 1976

Synonyms
- Trochoidea pseudojacosta Forcart, 1976 · unaccepted (original combination); Xerocrassa (Xerocrassa) pseudojacosta (Forcart, 1976) · alternate representation

Species of gastropod

Xerocrassa pseudojacosta is a species of air-breathing land snail, a terrestrial pulmonate gastropod mollusk in the family Geomitridae, the hairy snails and their allies.

This species is endemic to Israel.
