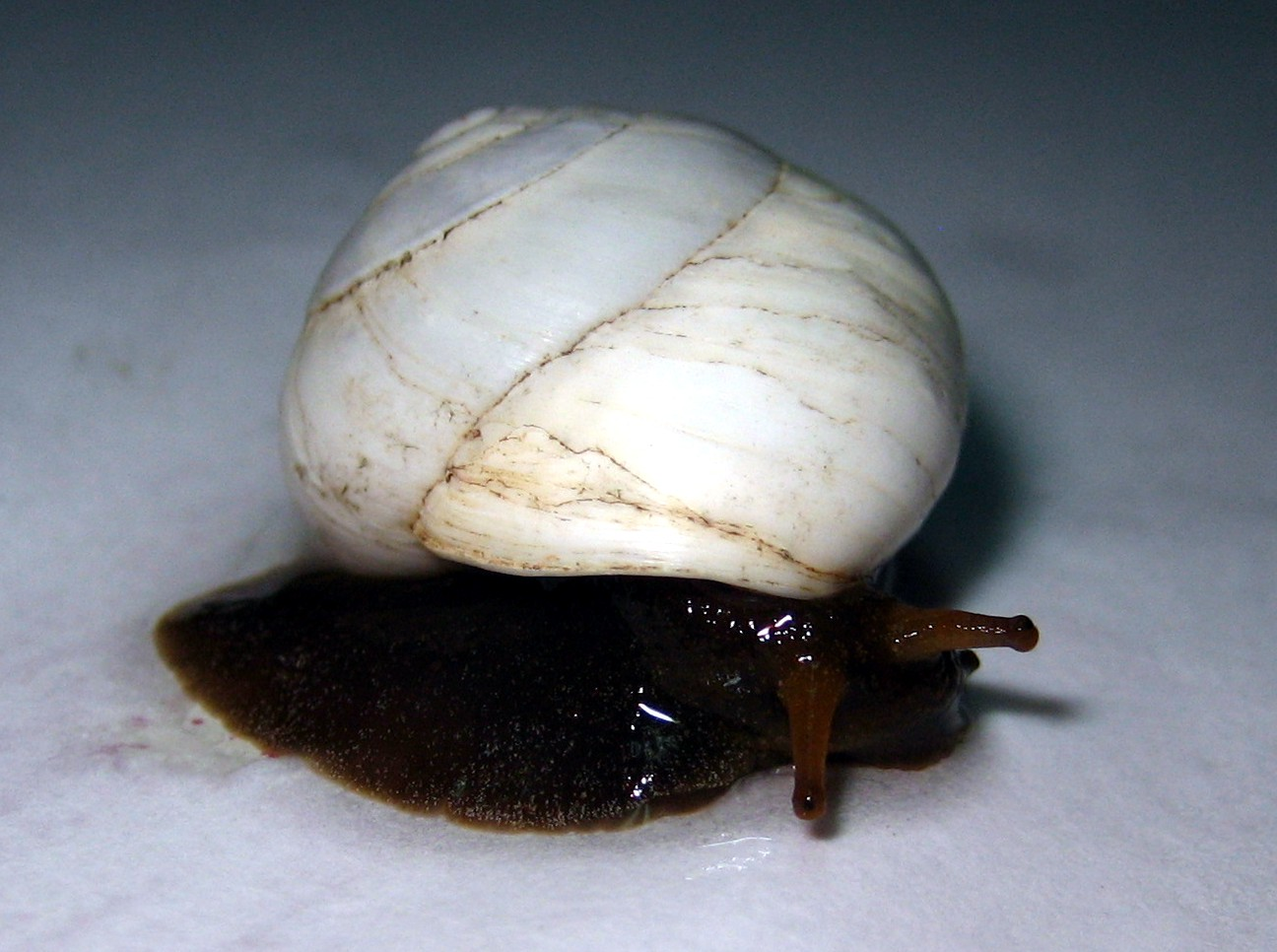
- A lateral view of a live individual of Sphincterochila candidissima
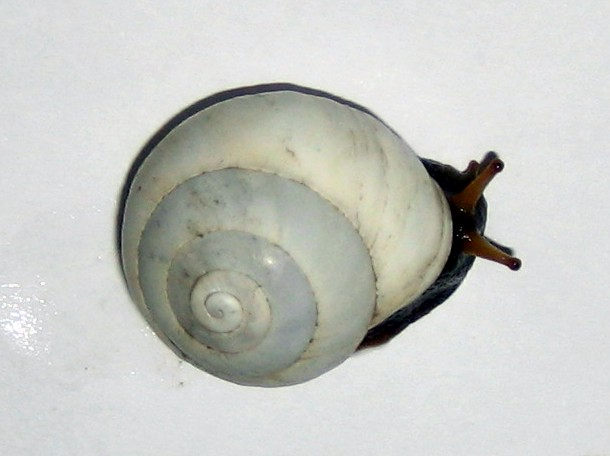
- A dorsal view of a live individual of Sphincterochila candidissima

Scientific classification
- Kingdom: Animalia
- Phylum: Mollusca
- Class: Gastropoda
- Order: Stylommatophora
- Family: Sphincterochilidae
- Genus: Sphincterochila
- Species: S. candidissima

Binomial name
- Sphincterochila candidissima (Draparnaud, 1801)

Synonyms
- Albea candidissima (Draparnaud, 1801) (superseded generic combination); Helix candidissima Draparnaud, 1801; Leucochroa candidissima (Draparnaud, 1801); Leucochroa liedtkei Kobelt, 1903 (junior synonym); Sphincterochila (Albea) candidissima (Draparnaud, 1801) alternate representation; Sphincterochila (Albea) candidissima candidissima (Draparnaud, 1801) (superseded combination)

= Sphincterochila candidissima =

Species of gastropod

Sphincterochila candidissima is a species of air-breathing land snail, a terrestrial pulmonate gastropod mollusk in the family Sphincterochilidae.

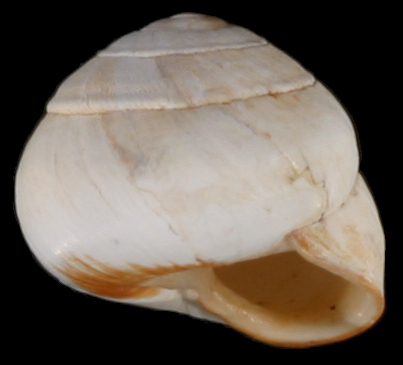
Apertural view of a shell of Sphincterochila candidissima

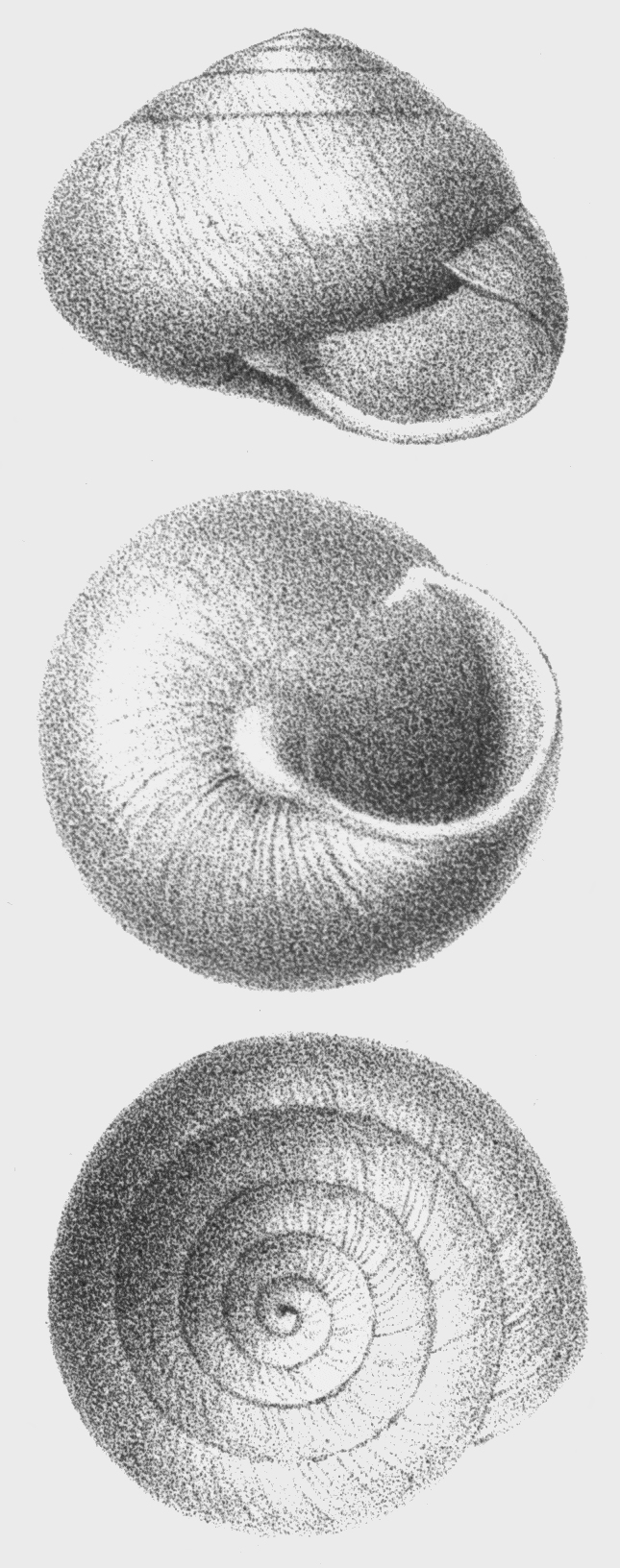
Drawing of apertural, basal and apical view of a shell of Sphincterochila candidissima

== Subspecies ==
- Sphincterochila candidissima crassa (Pallary, 1926)

== Distribution ==
This species occurs in France, Italy, Malta and other areas.

== Shell description ==
The shell is subimperforate, globose, solid and cretaceous. The shell has 5 whorls, rather flattened, the upper ones carinate above the suture, carina afterwards becoming evanescent. The last whorl is deflected in front. The peristome is subpatulous, thickened within.

The width of the shell is 16–25 mm.
