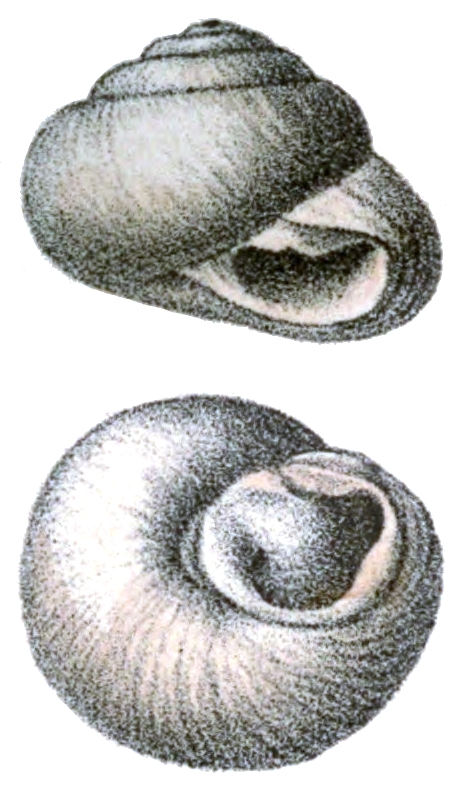
- Drawing of the shell of Sphincterochila zonata zonata.

Scientific classification
- Kingdom: Animalia
- Phylum: Mollusca
- Class: Gastropoda
- Order: Stylommatophora
- Family: Sphincterochilidae
- Genus: Sphincterochila
- Species: S. zonata
- Subspecies: S. z. zonata

Trinomial name
- Sphincterochila zonata zonata (Bourguignat, 1853)

Synonyms
- Albea (Sphincterochila) boissieri Charpentier, 1847 (superseded generic combination); Helix boissieri Charpentier, 1847 (invalid; not S. Moricand, 1846); Sphincterochila boissieri (Charpentier, 1847) (based on invalid original name); Zonites boissieri (Charpentier, 1847) (based on an invalid original name); Zonites boissieri var. zonata Bourguignat, 1853

= Sphincterochila zonata zonata =

Subspecies of gastropod

Sphincterochila zonata zonata is a subspecies of air-breathing land snail, a terrestrial pulmonate gastropod mollusc in the family Sphincterochilidae.

This species lives in deserts in Israel and Egypt.

Helix boissieri is the type species of the genus Sphincterochila. The type species was subsequently designated by Henry Augustus Pilsbry in 1895. It is named after botanist Pierre Edmond Boissier.

Sphincterochila zonata zonata lives in the Negev desert (Israel), and the Sinai desert in the Sinai Peninsula (Egypt).

== Shell description ==
Shell is cretaceous, white; consists of five convex whorls and a deflected ultimate whorl. The aperture is thickened, projecting internally in two subconcrescent denticles (described by Tryon as "tubercles").

The average diameter of the shell is 25 mm.

== Anatomy and physiology ==
The average body mass of Sphincterochila zonata zonata is around 4.3 g. Such mass is approximately divided in an even manner between the shell itself and the animal's soft parts. Schmidt-Nielsen et al., in 1971, found that 56% of the animal's body mass was contained in its shell. About 80 to 90% of the mass of the soft body parts is composed of water (according to the Yom-Tov 1970). On average, soft body parts contain 81% of water (nearly 1400 mg of water), 11% of proteins, 4% of ash, and little other organic matter. Sphincterochila zonata zonata has no energy reserves and the amount of lipids it contains is a fraction of 1%, which is considered to be extremely low.

== Ecology ==
=== Habitat ===
Sphincterochila zonata zonata lives in desert environments. This snail is common in areas with loess-limestone soils, and uncommon in areas that have a flint substrate.

Yom-Tov measured the maximum demographic density for Sphincterochila zonata zonata, encountering a value of 0.2-0.3 specimens/m^{2} in the area of the Negev desert he investigated in 1970. The snail Xerocrassa seetzeni was found to be more abundant there. On the other hand, in the Northern Negev area investigated by Steinberger et al. In 1981 Sphincterochila zonata zonata was the most abundant snail.

Sphincterochila zonata zonata along with other snail species and algae are the most significant faunal and floral components of the Negev and Sinai deserts ecosystems.

=== Adaptations for arid conditions ===
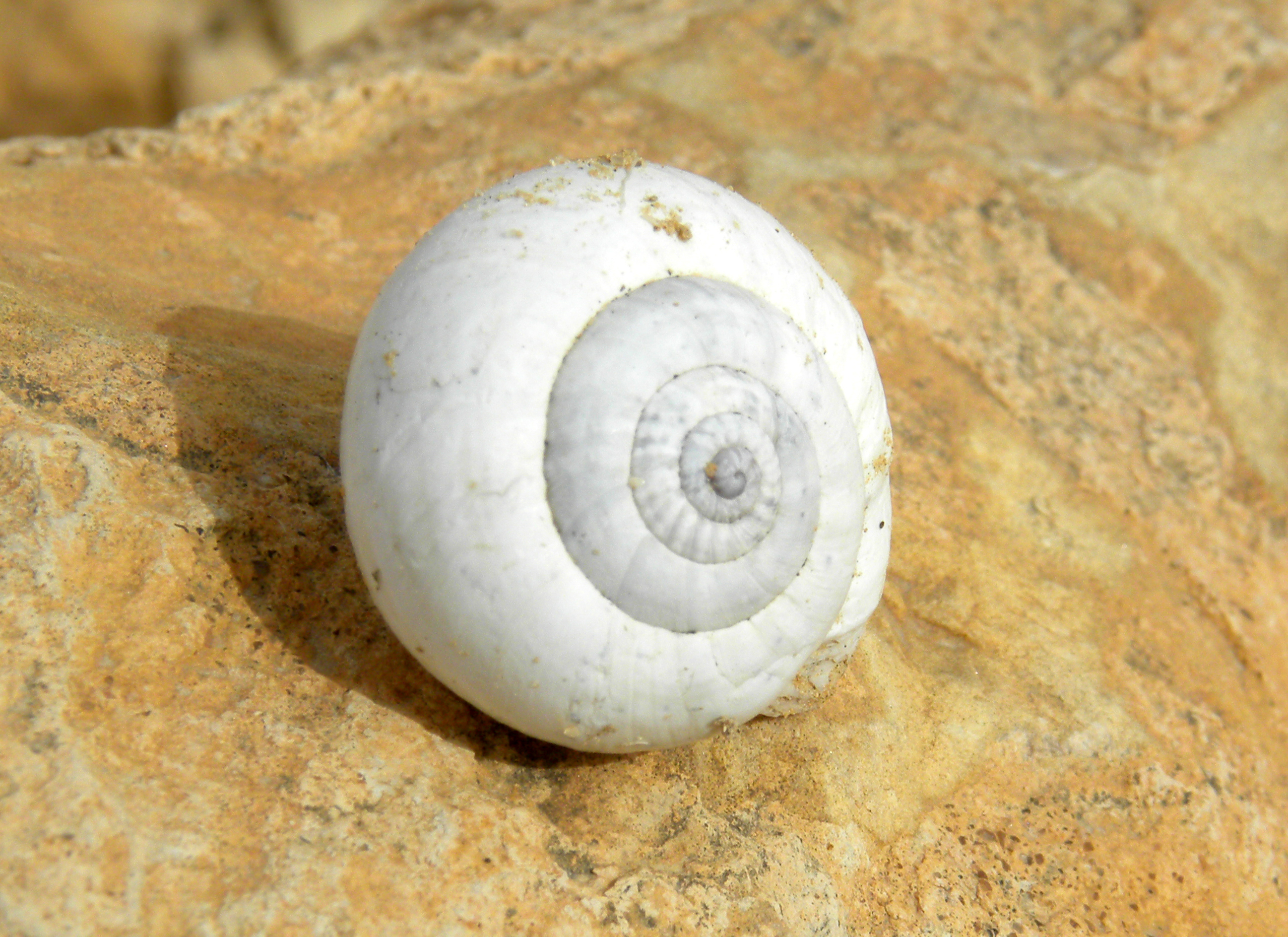
Sphincterochila zonata zonata in Hamakhtesh Hagadol, northern Negev. Diameter is 2.1 cm.

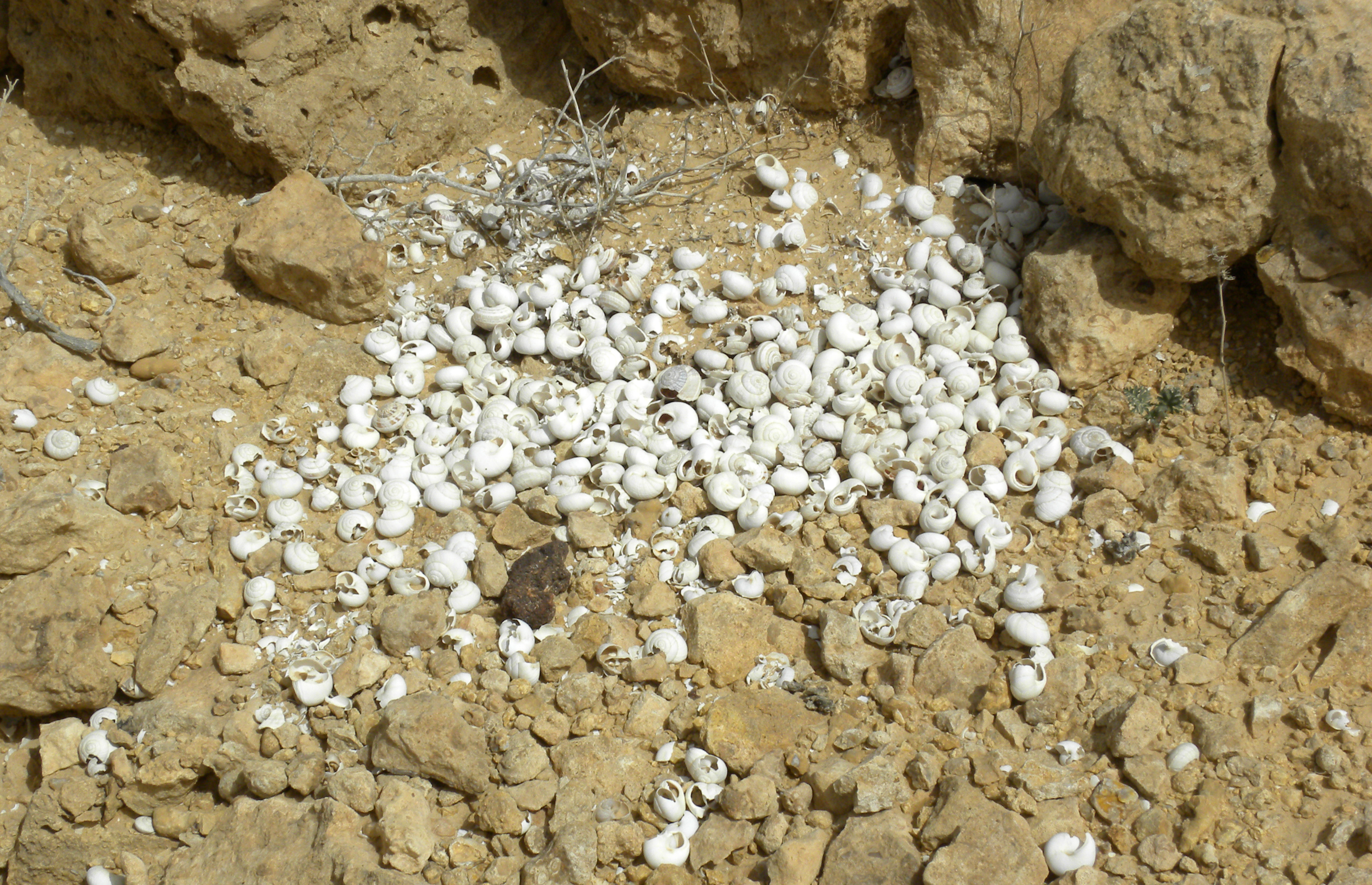
Sphincterochila zonata zonata shells below a limestone wall in Hamakhtesh Hagadol, northern Negev.

This species presents adaptations to arid conditions which significantly improve its desiccation tolerance. Some of those adaptations include a thick shell and a relatively reduced aperture (see also Machin 1967), a thick epiphragm, and slow body surface heat conduction. About 90% of its shell surface reflects the visible portion of the solar spectrum, and much over 90% of the solar spectrum itself. Sphincterochila zonata zonata also produces a new epiphragm after every period of activity (see also Yom-Tov 1971).

These snails dig themselves into the soil to depths from 1 to 5 cm while they aestivate during summer in the Negev Desert. In the vicinity of the Dead Sea, they usually either burrow to depths of up to 10 cm, or aestivate hidden under stones.

All dormant snails of this species can resist ambient temperatures up to 50 °C, but temperatures of 55 °C and above are usually lethal. The soft parts of the animal's body shelter inside the second and the third whorl of its shell, where the temperature can reach up to 50.3 °C. Temperatures of up to 56.2 °C were measured and are known to occur inside the shell's body whorl, which is mostly filled with air during aestivation.

Dormant snails experience water loss of 0.5 mg per day per snail in summer, with a very low oxygen consumption rate. For these reasons, dormant Sphincterochila zonata zonata can survive severe droughts for several years.

=== Life cycle ===
Sphincterochila zonata zonata is active for a few days only after rainfall during the winter season, from November to March. At this time of the year they feed, mate, and lay eggs. Thus these snails are active for only 5-7% of the year (nearly 18 to 26 days), and aestivate during all the rest of the time.

Dormant snails are known to have survived in museum collections for up to 6 years. Schmidt-Nielsen et al. in 1971 estimated their life span according to their oxygen consumption as being nearly 8 years.

=== Feeding habits ===
Sphincterochila zonata zonata feeds on soil, especially loess mud after rains, lichens, soil algae and surface of limestone directly. It does not eat higher plants.

=== Predators ===
The known predators of Sphincterochila zonata zonata are rodents, namely the Cairo Spiny Mouse (Acomys cahirinus), Wagner's Gerbil (Dipodillus dasyurus) and the Asian Garden Dormouse (Eliomys melanurus).
