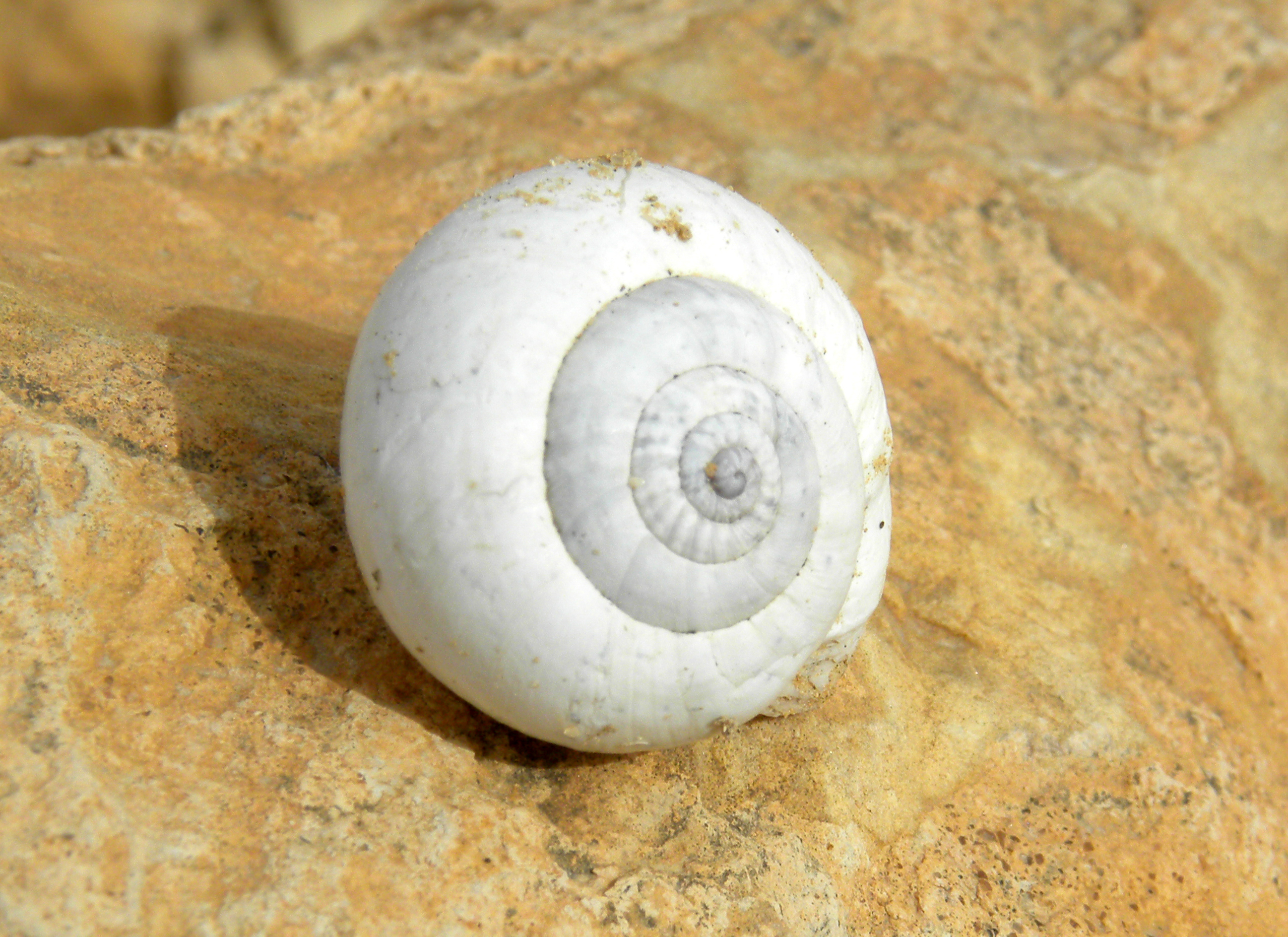

Scientific classification
- Kingdom: Animalia
- Phylum: Mollusca
- Class: Gastropoda
- Order: Stylommatophora
- Family: Sphincterochilidae
- Genus: Sphincterochila
- Species: S. zonata

Binomial name
- Sphincterochila zonata (Bourguignat, 1853)

Synonyms
- Zonites boissieri var. zonata Bourguignat, 1853

= Sphincterochila zonata =

Species of mollusc

Sphincterochila zonata is a species of air-breathing land snail, a terrestrial pulmonate gastropod mollusk in the family Sphincterochilidae.

It inhabits the Negev desert in Israel. It has been described as a synonym for a sister species, S. boissieri, based on initial discoveries of the species by Bourguignat in 1853, though this is not entirely clear throughout current literature.

Subspecies

- Sphincterochila zonata filia (Mousson, 1861) shell photo 1, shell photo 2, shell drawing (figure 70–71.)
- Sphincterochila zonata zonata (Bourguignat, 1853) (synonym: Helix boissieri Charpentier, 1847)

== Anatomy and physiology ==
Sphincterochila zonata reproduction is constituted by hermaphroditic cycles. This includes a spermatogenic cycle which is activated through August and September and an oogenic cycle that occurs in December until January. Reproductive cycles are also linked to the weather patterns of the Negev desert region as well. Aestivation, or dormancy, in S. zonata occurs during the dry season and persists for most of the year. Characteristics of vertebrate-like hormones such as testosterone, estrogen, and progesterone have been observed generating throughout aestivation fluxes.

== Ecology ==
=== Habitat ===
Characterized as one of the most abundant desert snails of the central Negev desert, a region of Southern Israel, by Bourguignat in 1853. Found often in exposed areas, in opposition to other snails of this region. During the rainy period of the year, occurring from November to March, Sphincterochila zonata actively feed and reproduce. Furthermore, S. zonata is largely inactive during the dry season, and is only active for around ten to thirty days of the year. In dry conditions, S. zonata inhabits more sheltered areas, including under soil or bushes. The diet of S. zonata consists primarily of the microflora existing within surface soils.

=== Significant adaptations ===
Of interest in this animal is its resistance to desiccation, which allows it to live in exposed areas in the desert. Body water in S. zonata can be maintained comparatively to other species during activity, though during inactivity body water percentage decreases over time. In a test relative to other species of Sphincterochila, S. zonata was able to retain the most water and maintain water content within its soft body.

Further interest exists in these snails’ hormone levels and their yearly fluctuations in the study of aestivation. As cited from Goodfriend and Magaritz (1987), S. zonata is only active for a few days out of the year, depending on rain patterns. Aestivation is an obvious energy requirement of this organism in that it is too costly to continuously generate spermatocytes and oocytes for reproduction. Research regarding HSP production during aestivation and the regulation of arousal during this dormancy has been of interest most recently within S. zonata.

== Phylogeny ==
The genetic variability within the 15-species genus Sphincterochila is predominantly due to differences in water availability. S. zonata is a species endemic to Israel and likely diverged from S. fimbriata (or a similar ancestor) around 1.3 million years ago.

== Relation to Sphincterochila boissieri ==
The relationship between these species is not clearly defined, and there are few citations within academic literature that acknowledge the relationship between them. There is apparent belief that the writings of Bourguignat from 1853, which describe some of the first records of S. zonata, are descriptive of both S. zonata and S. boissieri. Furthermore, in an article published in 1983, S. zonata is referenced with respect to studies that have been conducted concerning it, with citations of studies that describe studies on S. boissieri as well as S. zonata.
