= Xerocrassa langloisiana =

Scientific classification
- Domain: Eukaryota
- Kingdom: Animalia
- Phylum: Mollusca
- Class: Gastropoda
- Order: Stylommatophora
- Family: Geomitridae
- Genus: Xerocrassa
- Species: X. langloisiana

Binomial name
- Xerocrassa langloisiana (Bourguignat, 1853)

Synonyms
- Helix (Xerophila) hierocontina Westerlund, 1889 (junior synonym); Helix improbata Mousson, 1861 (junior synonym); Helix langloisiana Bourguignat, 1853; Helix langloisiana var. major Mousson, 1861 (junior synonym); Xerocrassa (Xerocrassa) langloisiana (Bourguignat, 1853) · alternate representation

Species of gastropod

Xerocrassa langloisiana is a species of air-breathing land snail, a pulmonate gastropod mollusc in the family Geomitridae.

== Distribution ==
This species is native to Palestine, Israel and Jordan.
