= Wildlife of Jordan =

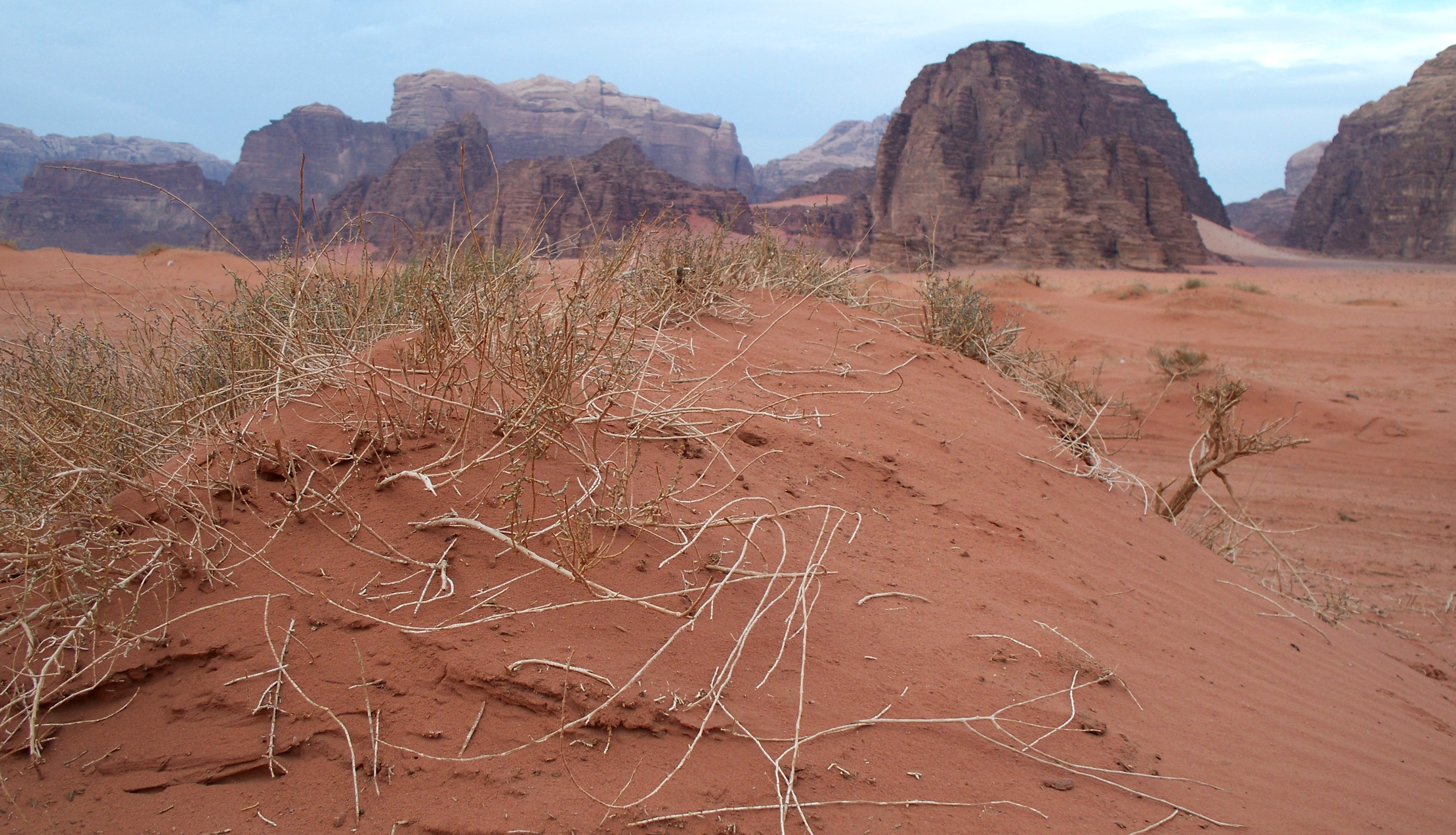
Desert vegetation in Wadi Rum, southern Jordan.

The wildlife of Jordan includes its flora and fauna and their natural habitats. Although much of the country is desert, it has several geographic regions, each with a diversity of plants and animals adapted to their own particular habitats. Fossil finds show that in Palaeolithic times, the region had Syrian brown bears, Asiatic lions and Syrian elephants, but these species are all now extinct in this region.

More recently, in the twentieth century, the Arabian leopard and Arabian oryx became locally extinct through hunting, and several species of deer and gazelle were reduced to remnant populations. The Royal Society for the Conservation of Nature was established in 1966 to preserve Jordan's natural resources, a number of protected areas have been set up, and conservation measures and captive breeding programs have been put in place, resulting in an increase in the numbers of these animals. In 1978, 11 Arabian oryx were brought to Jordan from the US. They were taken care of at the Shaumari Wildlife Reserve. Since then, not only has the oryx population reached 200, but Jordan is supplying other countries with oryx. Many other mammals are found in Jordan, over four hundred species of bird visit or live in the country and over two thousand plant species have been recorded here. A total of 220 bird species migrate to and from Jordan from, Europe, Asia and Africa. In addition, 150 species are native to Jordan.

== Geography ==
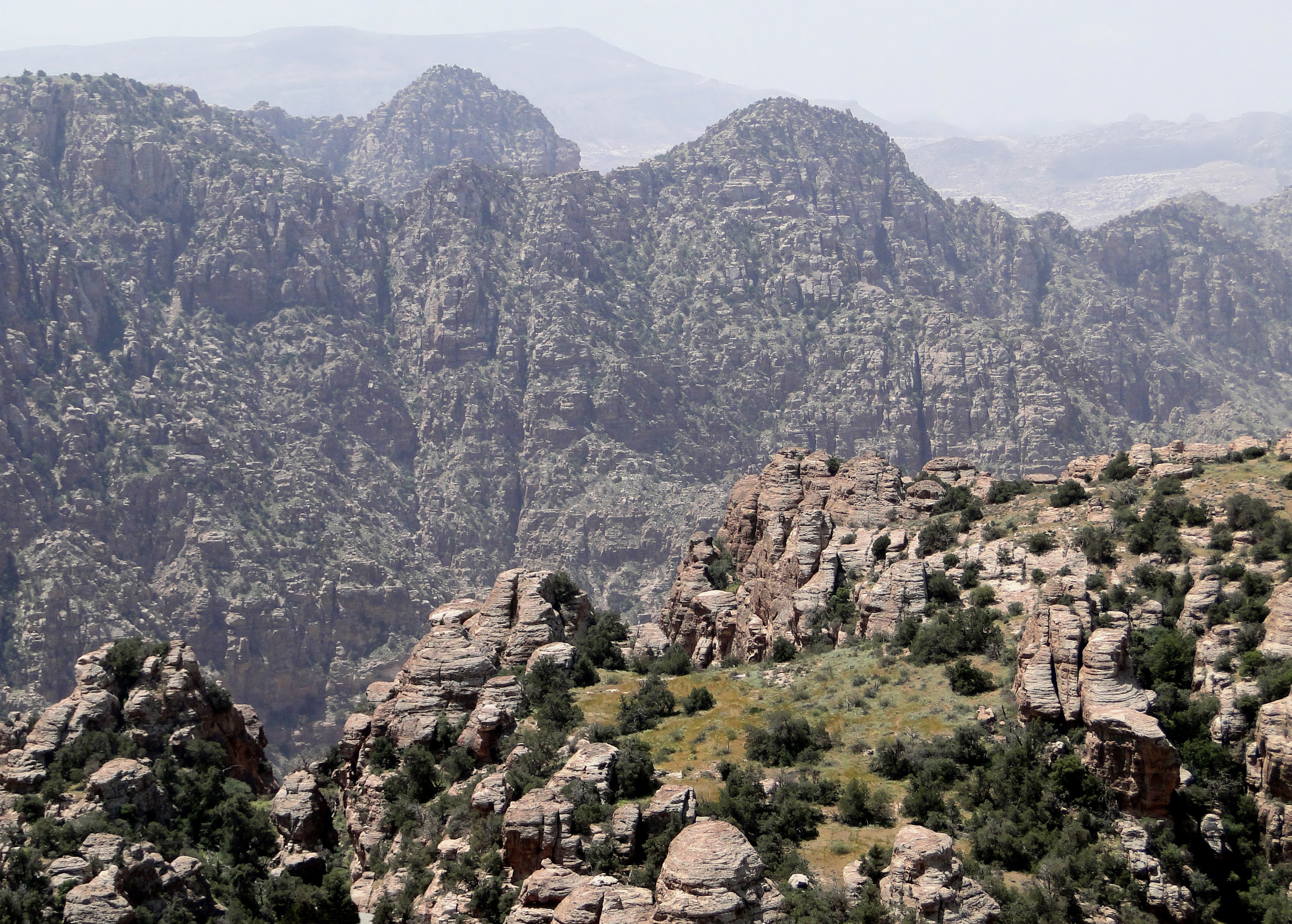
The Dana Biosphere Reserve in south central Jordan.

Apart from a very short stretch of coastline on the Gulf of Aqaba, Jordan is almost completely landlocked. It largely consists of an elevated plateau 700 to 1,200 m (2,300 to 3,900 ft) high, divided into ridges by valleys and gorges. The eastern part of the country is desert and merges into the Syrian Desert and the northern part of the Arabian Desert. There are some oases here and some seasonal streams. The western part of the country is more mountainous with a natural vegetation of Mediterranean evergreen forest. The western border is the Jordan Rift Valley, where the Jordan River and the Dead Sea lie hundreds of feet below sea level and form the boundary between Jordan, to the east, and Israel and the Palestinian territories to the west.

The northern part of the Jordan Valley is the most fertile region of the country. The Dead Sea receives the water from the Jordan River and from seasonal streams in the wadis, but has no outflow. It loses water by evaporation, is extremely saline, and supports no animal or plant life. Further south, the country's western boundary is formed by the escarpment at the edge of the Great Rift Valley that continues southward to the Gulf of Aqaba. The climate is hot and dry in summer, and cool in winter, the time of year when all the precipitation occurs.

== Flora ==
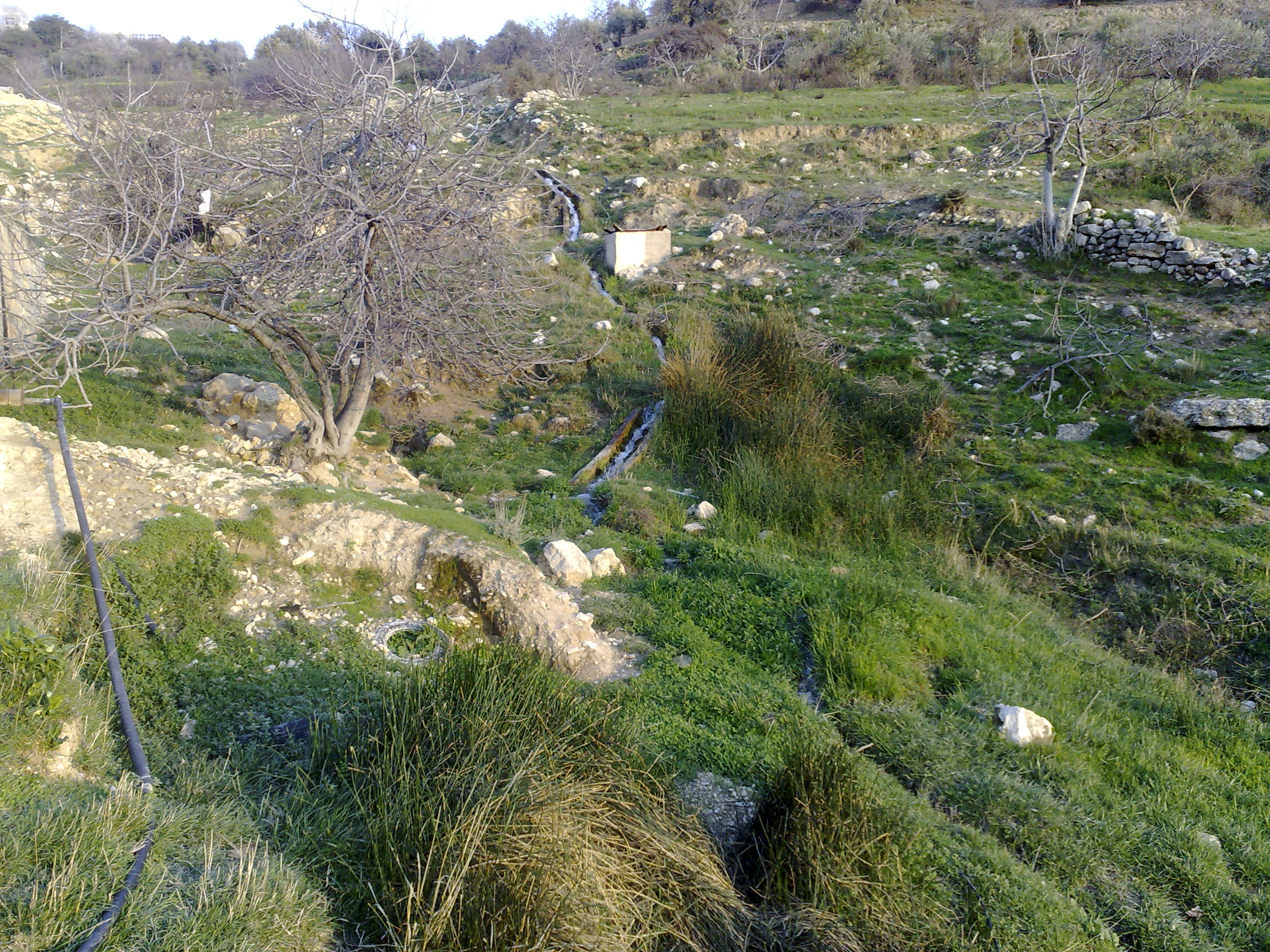
Mahis in northwestern Jordan

Jordan has a range of biodiverse habitats and over two thousand species of plant have been recorded in the country; this includes about 150 plant families and 700 genera. Just three of these are gymnosperms; Aleppo pine, Mediterranean cypress and Phoenecian juniper. Somewhere between five and ten species of ferns have been recorded, as well as about 150 species of fungi and lichen.

Many of the flowering plants bloom in the spring after the winter rains and the type of vegetation depends largely on the amount of precipitation. The mountainous regions in the northwest are clothed in natural forests of pine, deciduous oak, evergreen oak, pistachio and wild olive. Further south and east, the vegetation becomes more scrubby and merges into a steppe-type vegetation, and the centre and east of the country are largely hamada, a hard desert plateau with little sand.

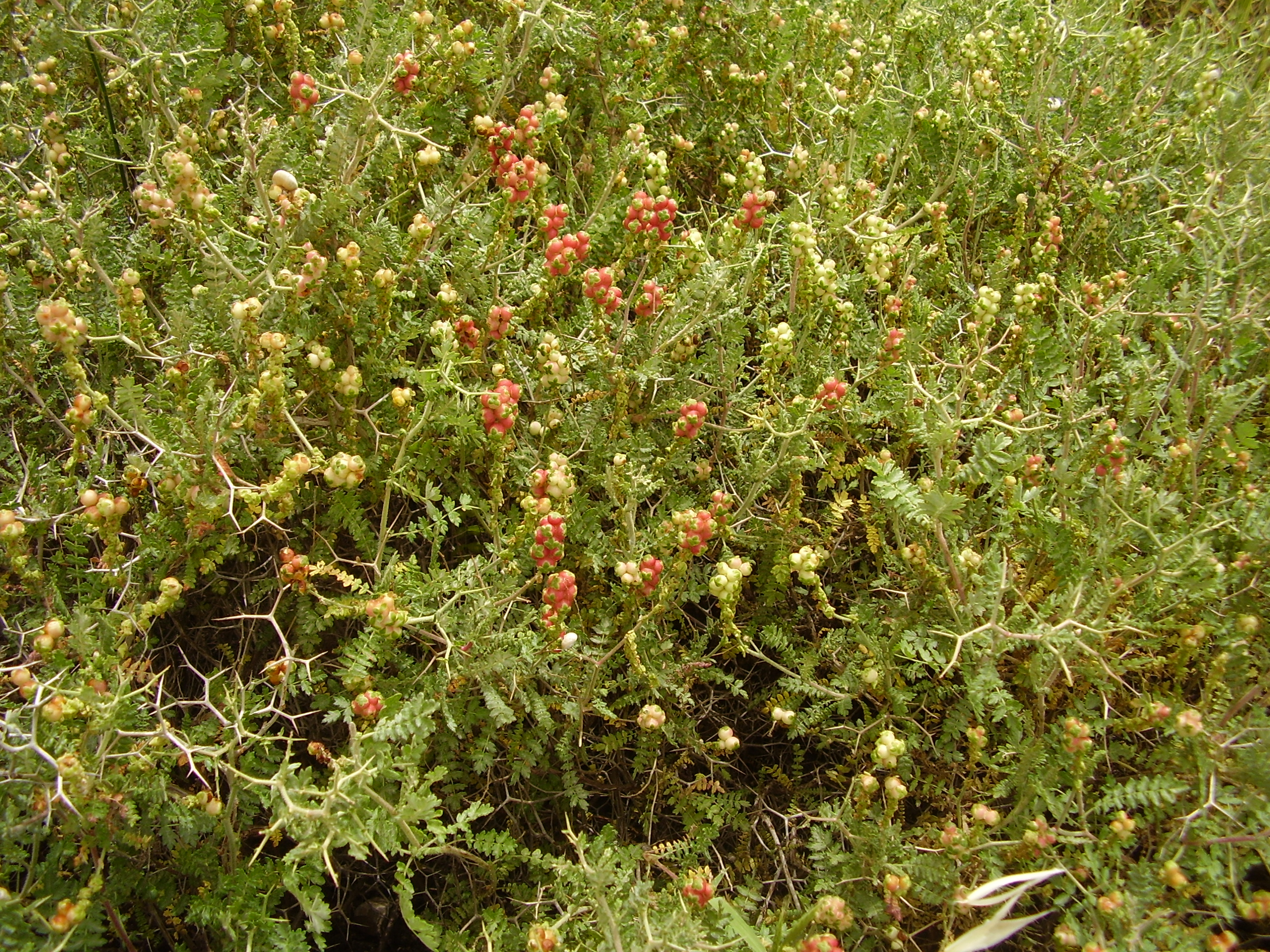
Thorny burnet (Sarcopoterium spinosum)

The slopes overlooking the rift valley are seared with wadis which run with water in the winter and support a lush growth of trees and bushes in otherwise inhospitable terrain. In the rift valley, the Fifa Nature Reserve includes saltpans and areas of semi-tropical vegetation. Further south is the Qatar Nature Reserve, close to the Gulf of Aqaba, and this area is dry throughout the year and contains steppe-type vegetation with Acacia trees.

In the scrubby area the main woody species is Sarcopoterium spinosum and the steppe area is dominated by Ballota undulata and Salvia dominica, with Astragalus bethlemiticus and Marrubium libanoticum. The hamada region has a limited number of species. Stony areas are often dominated by Anabasis spp. while sandier areas have more Retama raetam. In wadi areas, gravelly washes or places subject to flash floods, there is a more diverse flora which includes Tamarix, Artemisia and Acacia, and pebbly areas typically have Salsola verticillata and Halogeton alopecuroides. The national flower of Jordan is the black iris (Iris nigricans) which can be found growing near Madaba.

== Fauna ==
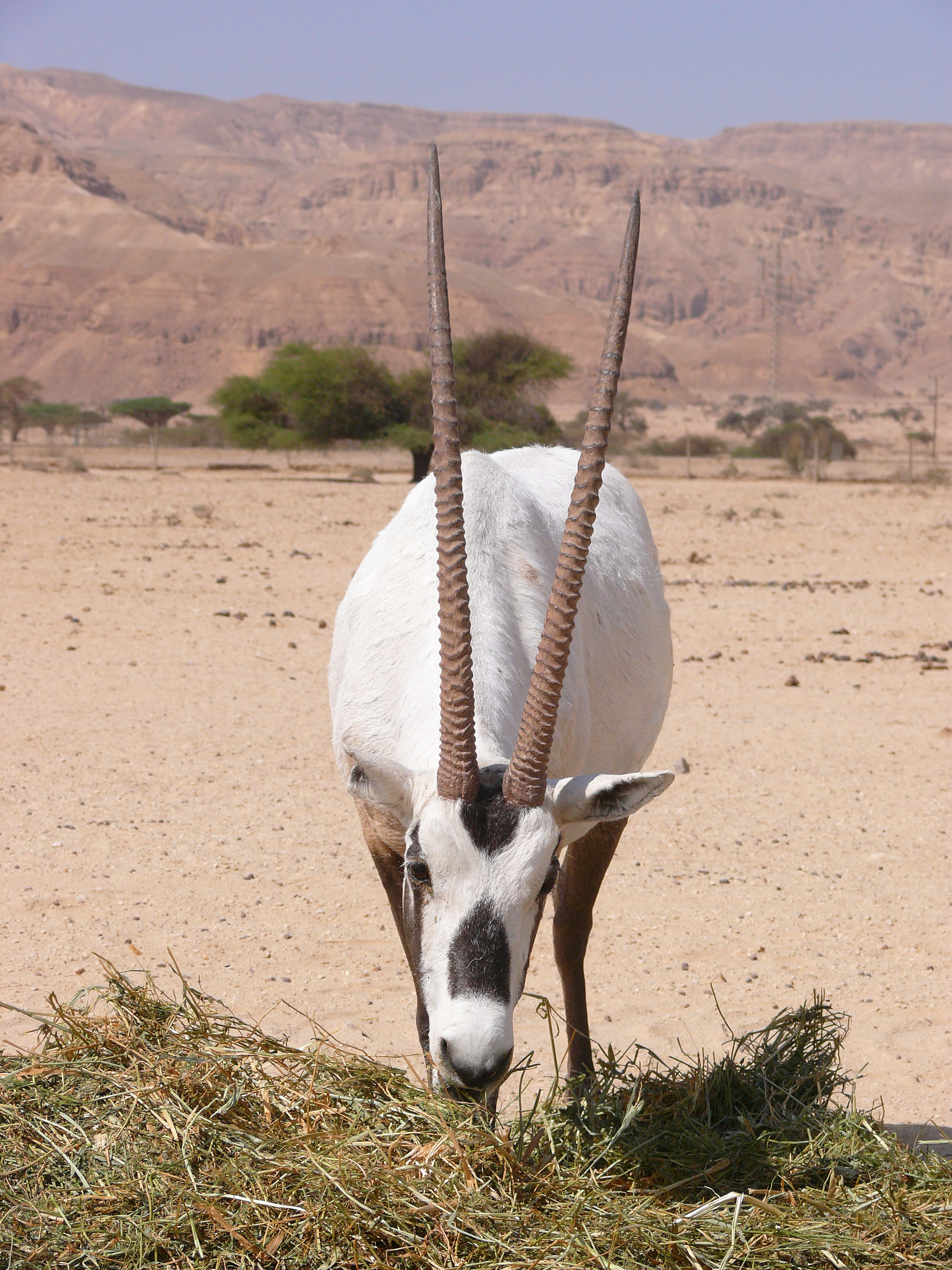
Arabian oryx

Hunting is a traditional sport in Jordan, and in the 1930s, the Arabian oryx was hunted to extinction in the country. Three species of gazelle, the dorcas, goitered and mountain gazelles, were also hunted and greatly reduced in numbers. In 1973, legislation was enacted to control hunting, with a closed season being introduced and quotas being set. The Shaumari Wildlife Reserve, a fenced off area in the deserts of central Jordan, has since been used in a breeding and reintroduction programme for the Arabian oryx, as well as other species such as the Somali ostrich, the Persian onager and gazelles. Other animals that have been released into the wild are the Nubian ibex, wild boar, fallow deer and roe deer.

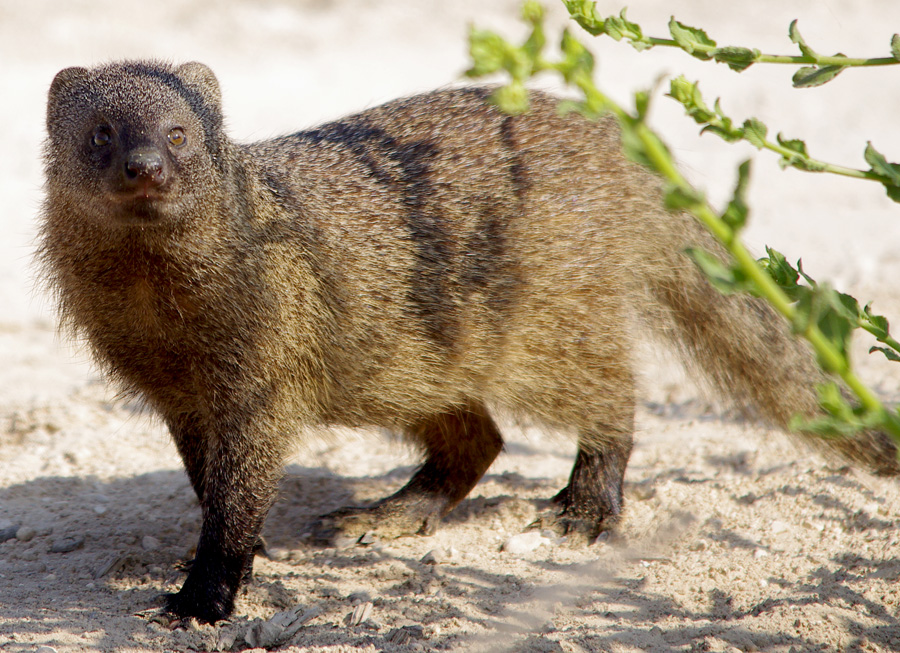
Egyptian mongoose

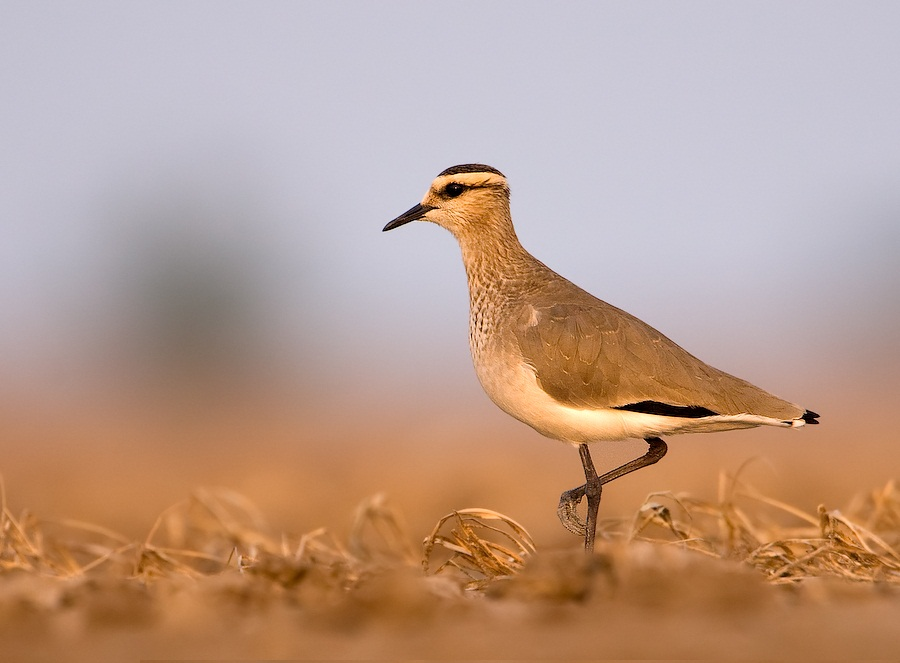
The critically endangered sociable lapwing

Carnivorous mammals in Jordan include the striped hyena, caracal, jungle cat, sand cat, African wildcat, Arabian wolf, golden jackal, fennec fox, Arabian red fox, Blanford's fox, Rüppell's fox, Egyptian mongoose, least weasel, caucasian badger, honey badger and European otter. There are about twenty species of bat and a similar number of rodents including the Caucasian squirrel, Asian garden dormouse, Euphrates jerboa, Middle East blind mole-rat, and various voles, jirds, mice, rats, spiny mice, gerbils and hamsters. Other mammals found in suitable habitat are the wild boar, European hare, cape hare, Indian crested porcupine, rock hyrax, European hedgehog, long-eared hedgehog and desert hedgehog.

Approximately 426 species of bird have been recorded in Jordan. Many of these are rare or accidental arrivals, and others are migratory birds in passage between their breeding grounds and their wintering quarters. Others overwinter in Jordan and still others breed in the country. Some of them are globally threatened, and these include the white-headed duck, Atlantic petrel, northern bald ibis, Egyptian vulture, Griffon vulture, lappet-faced vulture, Pharaoh eagle-owl, barn owl, golden eagle, steppe eagle, greater spotted eagle, eastern imperial eagle, MacQueen's bustard, Siberian crane, sociable lapwing, saker falcon, marbled duck, aquatic warbler and Syrian serin. Four large raptors, the short-toed snake eagle, long-legged buzzard, Barbary falcon and Bonelli's eagle, are found in the Mujib Biosphere Reserve, and the globally threatened lesser kestrel breeds there. Other bird species prevalent in Jordan include the hooded crow, Eurasian jay, hoopoe, common cuckoo, Tristram's starling, house crow and white-spectacled bulbul.

Five species of turtle are known from Jordan and there are a variety of snakes, mostly colubrids and vipers, but with representatives of seven snake families. Other reptiles include geckos, skinks, agamid lizards, wall lizards, the desert monitor and the glass snake (a legless lizard). Amphibians are limited to a single species of newt, the southern banded newt, and four species of frogs and toads.

The number of freshwater fish species is limited but there are 25 species of native and introduced fish in eight families in the Jordan River and various lakes and dams. The Jordan bream is a species of fish endemic to the rivers and lakes of the Jordan River basin. It has been introduced to several lakes and reservoirs in the region including the Azraq Wetland Reserve, although this oasis in the eastern desert is drying up because excessive quantities of groundwater are being extracted. The critically endangered Azraq toothcarp is also hanging on to existence in this single location, with a population consisting of an estimated few thousand individuals.

== Wildlife of Aqaba ==
The Gulf of Aqaba is rich with marine life, around 500 to 1000 species of fish inhabit the gulf, many of which are residents, like lion fish and octopus, while others are migratory, appearing mostly during the summer, such as the worlds fastest fish, the sailfish, as well as the worlds largest fish, the whale shark. The Gulf of Aqaba is home to marine mammals and reptiles, including hawksbill sea turtles, green sea turtles, bottlenose dolphins and risso's dolphins. A few predatory shark species inhabit the gulf as well, including tiger sharks, thresher sharks, oceanic whitetip and reef sharks. The shortfin mako shark is the most common shark caught by fishermen, locally known as "oasaf/قصف", whereas whale sharks are the most common sighted ones. Most shark species pose no threats to human beings, attacks are extremely rare and are usually a result of misidentification. In 2018, a blue whale was spotted in the gulf.

Divers commonly sight yellowmouth moray eels, Napoleon wrasse, frogfish, Spanish dancer, groupers, barracuda, clownfish, eagle rays, bluespotted ribbontail rays, as well as other members of the sting ray family.

The Gulf of Aqaba hosts more than 390 bird species including migratory birds such as the greater flamingo, great white pelican and the pink-backed pelican.

== Conservation ==
The Royal Society for the Conservation of Nature was set up in 1966 to protect and manage the natural resources of Jordan. Under its auspices, the Dana Biosphere Reserve and the Mujib Biosphere Reserve have been set up, as well as about nine wildlife, forest, wetland and other nature reserves.
