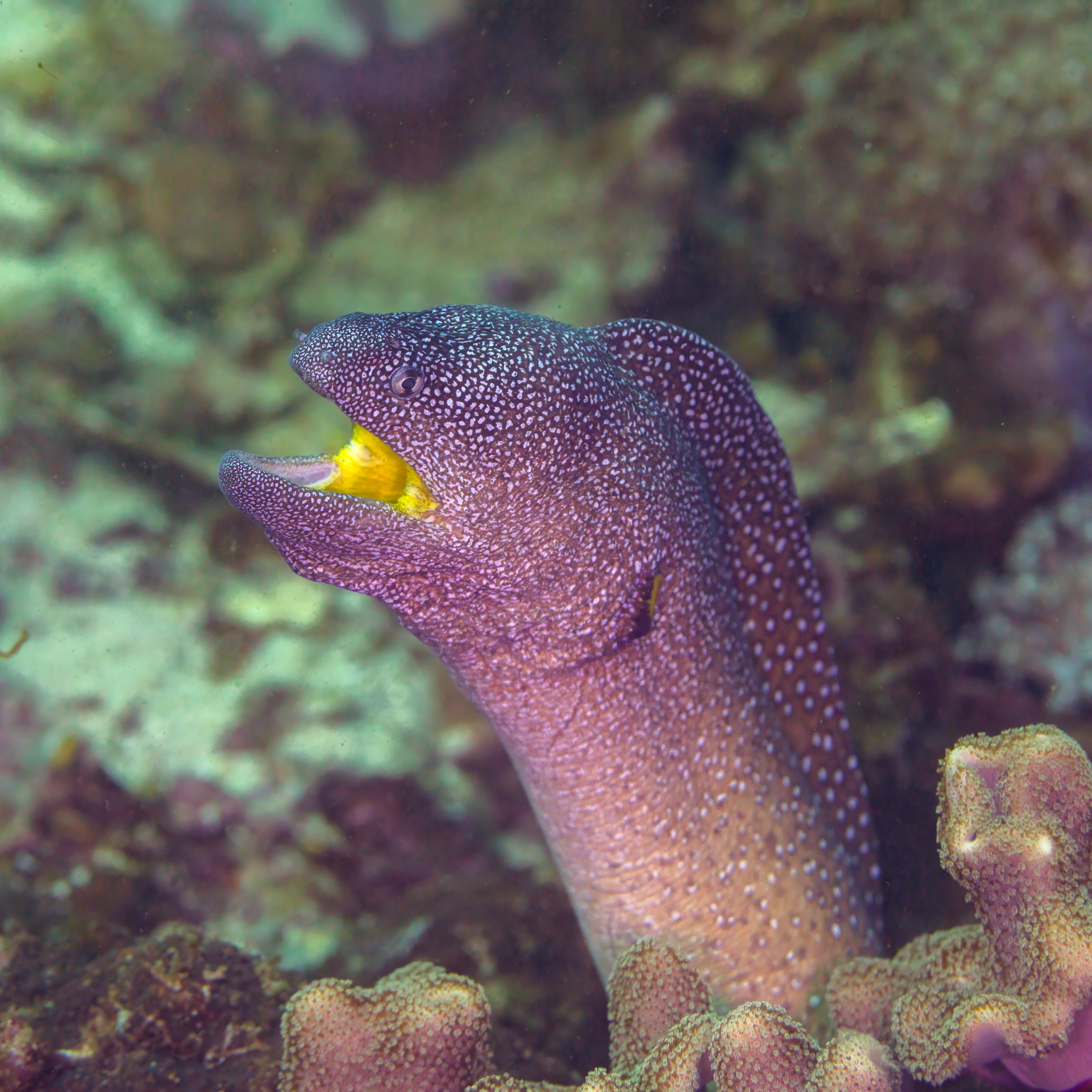

Conservation status
- Least Concern (IUCN 3.1)

Scientific classification
- Kingdom: Animalia
- Phylum: Chordata
- Class: Actinopterygii
- Division: Teleostei
- Order: Anguilliformes
- Family: Muraenidae
- Genus: Gymnothorax
- Species: G. nudivomer

Binomial name
- Gymnothorax nudivomer (Günther, 1867)

= Gymnothorax nudivomer =

Species of fish

Gymnothorax nudivomer, the starry moray or yellowmouth moray, is a species of marine fish in the family Muraenidae.

== Description ==
The starry moray is a large sized fish that can reach a maximum length of 180 cm, but the ones usually observed are rather smaller. Its serpentine in shape body has a brown background color dotted with small white spots circled with darker brown than its background color. The size of these spots is relatively small at the head and is getting larger toward the tail. One of the characteristic point to identify this moray is the yellow color of its inside mouth. The gills aperture is brown dark.

== Distribution and habitat ==
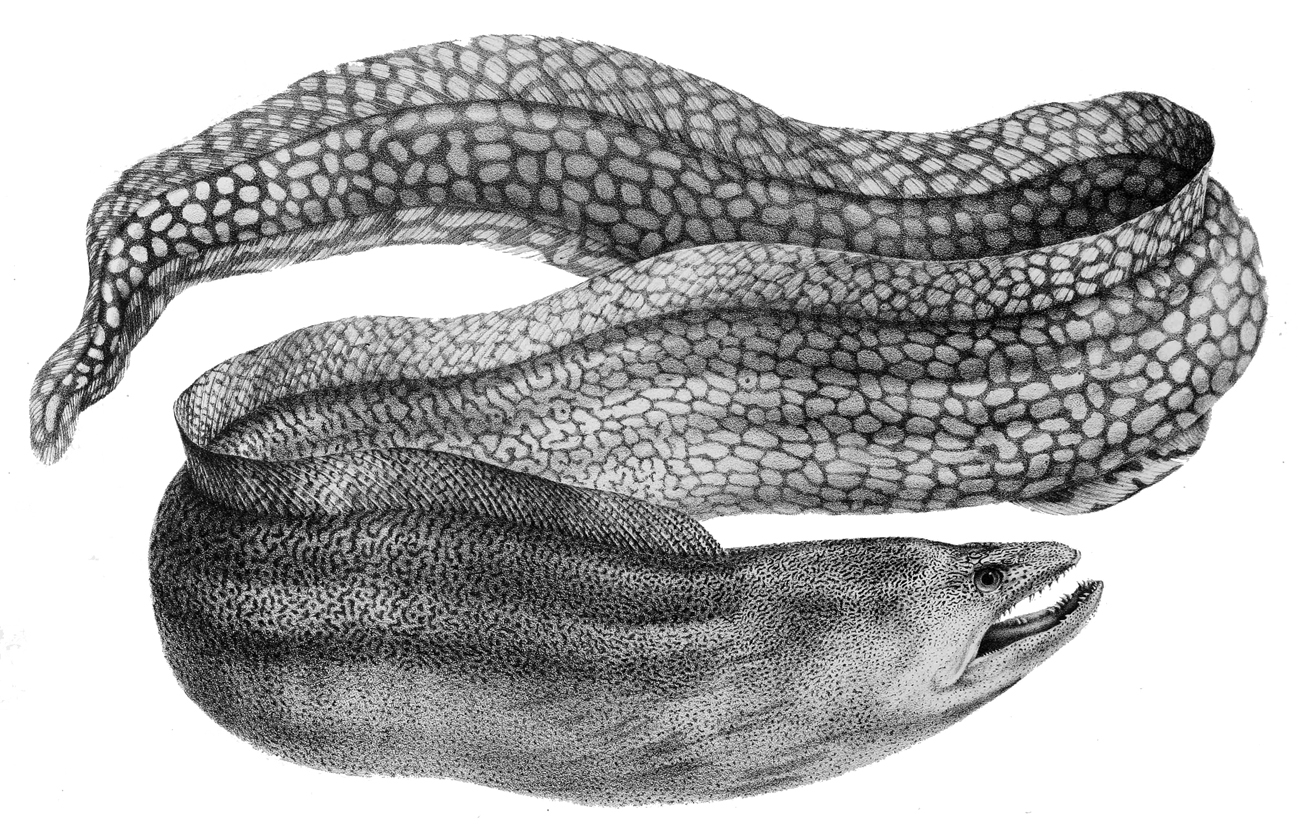

The starry moray is widespread throughout the Indo-Pacific area from eastern coast of Africa, Red Sea included, until Polynesia and Hawaii and from south Japan to New Caledonia.

It lives on the outer slopes of coral reefs, sitting sheltered in crevices between 3.3 and 894.3 feet (1.0 and 272.6 meters) deep, but is usually seen at depths of around 99 feet (30 meters).

== Biology ==
The starry moray is solitary and carnivorous, it leaves its lair at night to actively hunt its preys along the reef. It mainly feeds on fishes.

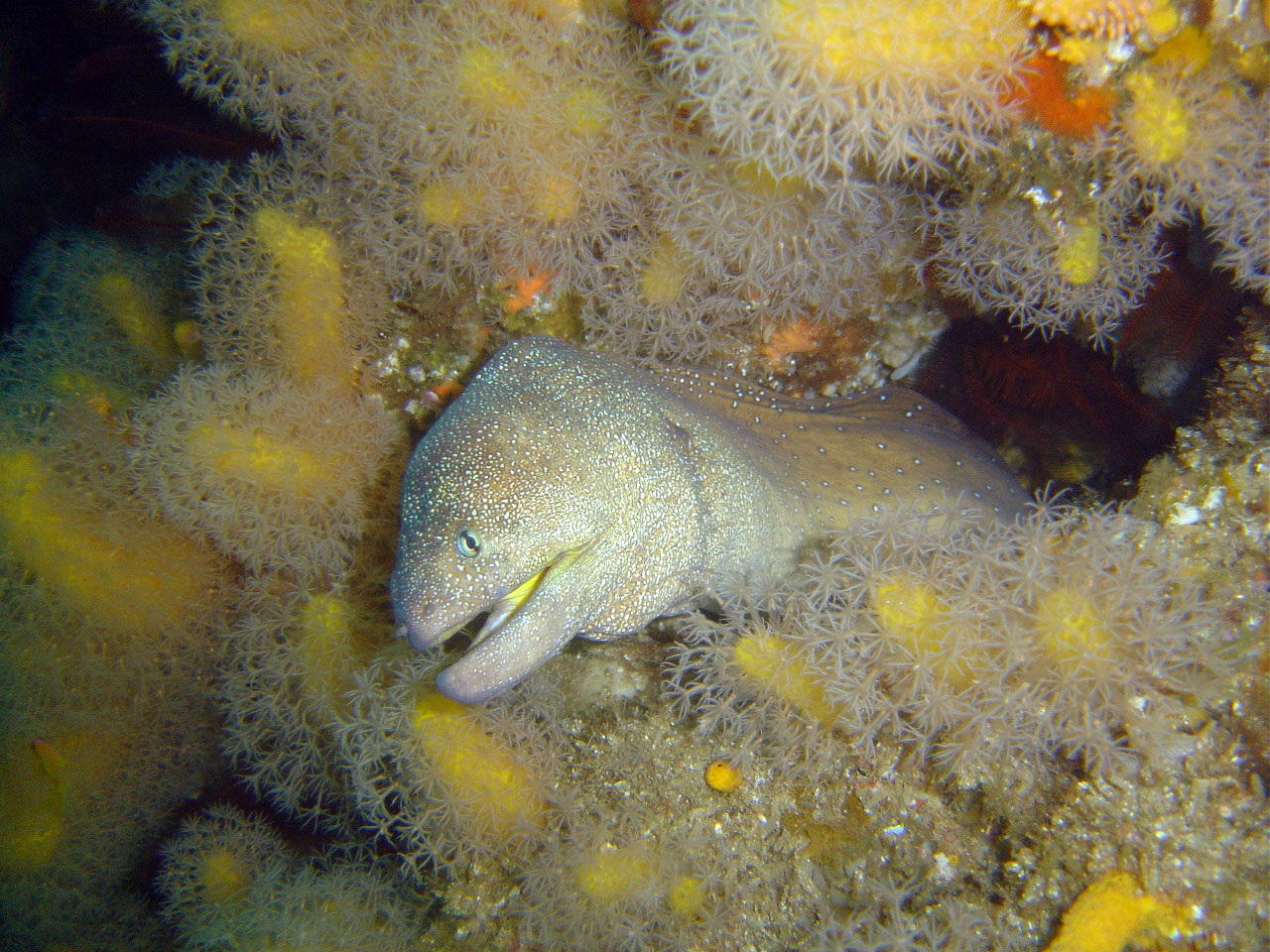
A starry moray at Aliwal Shoal
