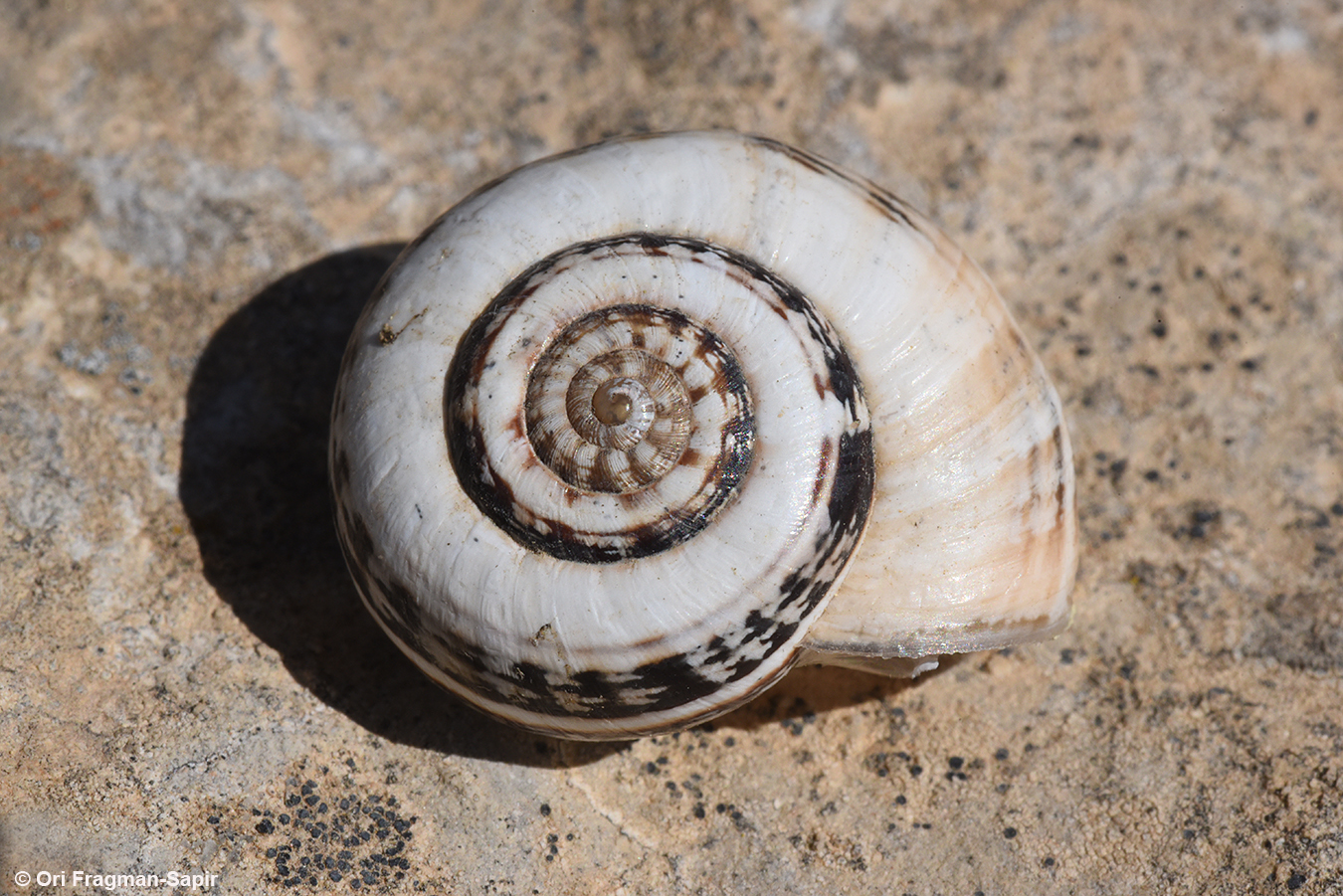
- Shell of Xerocrassa seetzeni

Scientific classification
- Kingdom: Animalia
- Phylum: Mollusca
- Class: Gastropoda
- Order: Stylommatophora
- Family: Geomitridae
- Genus: Xerocrassa
- Species: X. seetzeni

Binomial name
- Xerocrassa seetzeni (Pfeiffer, 1847)

Synonyms
- Helix seetzenii Pfeiffer, 1847; Helix (Euparypha) seetzeni (L. Pfeiffer, 1847); Helix (Euparypha) seetzeni var. antilibanica Germain, 1911; Helix sabaea Charpentier, 1847 (junior synonym); Helix seetzeni L. Pfeiffer, 1847 (original combination); Helix seetzeni var. avia Westerlund, 1889 (junior synonym); Helix seetzeni var. subinflata Mousson, 1861 (junior synonym); Trochoidea seetzenii (Charpentier, 1847); Xerocrassa (Xerocrassa) seetzeni (L. Pfeiffer, 1847) · alternate representation

= Xerocrassa seetzeni =

Species of gastropod

Xerocrassa seetzeni is a species of air-breathing land snail, a terrestrial pulmonate gastropod mollusk in the family Geomitridae.

== Distribution ==
Xerocrassa seetzeni is native to the Near East region, from Syria to northern Saudi Arabia.

In the area of the Negev desert in Israel, investigated by Yom-Tov (1970), Xerocrassa seetzeni was the most common snail species.
