= Pupoides coenopictus =

Scientific classification
- Domain: Eukaryota
- Kingdom: Animalia
- Phylum: Mollusca
- Class: Gastropoda
- Order: Stylommatophora
- Family: Pupillidae
- Genus: Pupoides
- Species: P. coenopictus

Binomial name
- Pupoides coenopictus (Hutton, 1834)

Species of gastropod

Pupoides coenopictus is a species of gastropods belonging to the family Pupillidae.

The species inhabits terrestrial environments.
