= Terrestrial animal =

Animals living on land

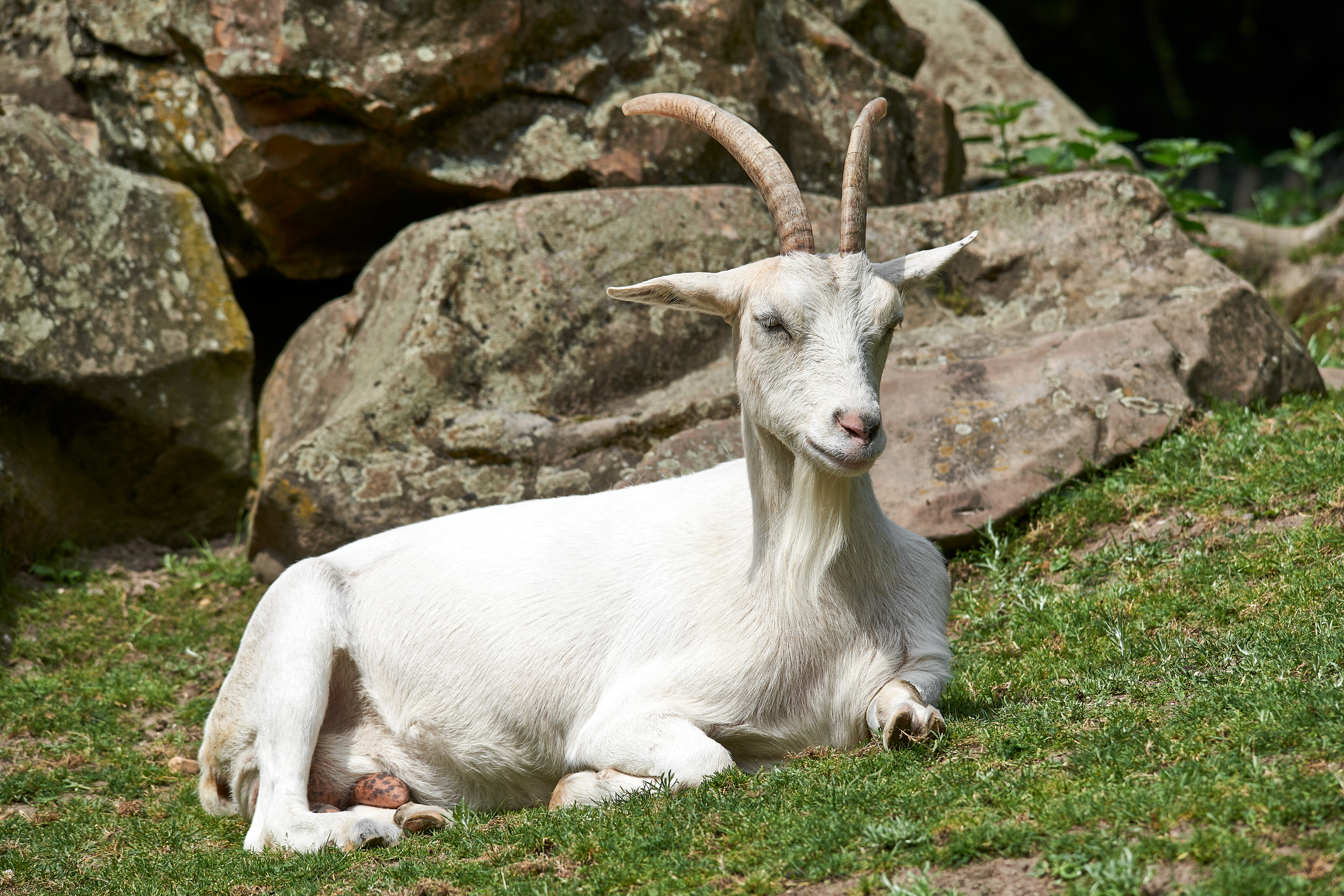
The goat is a terrestrial animal.

Terrestrial animals are animals that live predominantly or entirely on land (e.g., cats, chickens, ants, most spiders), as compared with aquatic animals (e.g., fish, whales, octopuses, lobsters, etc.), who live predominantly or entirely in bodies of water; and semiaquatic animals (e.g., crocodilians, seals, platypus and most amphibians), who inhabit coastal, riparian or wetland areas and rely on both aquatic and terrestrial habitats. While most insects (who constitute over half of all known species in the animal kingdom) are terrestrial, some groups, such as mosquitoes and dragonflies, spend their egg and larval stages in water but emerge as fully terrestrial adults (imagos) after completing metamorphosis.

Terrestrial animals conduct respiratory gas exchange directly with the atmosphere, typically via specialized respiratory organs known as lungs, or via cutaneous respiration across the skin. They have also evolved homeostatic features such as impermeable cuticles that can restrict fluid loss, temperature fluctuations and infection, and an excretory system that can filter out nitrogenous waste in the form of urea or uric acid, in contrast to the ammonia-based excretion of aquatic animals. Without the buoyancy of an aqueous environment to support their weight, they have evolved robust skeletons that can hold up their body shape, as well as powerful appendages known as legs or limbs to facilitate terrestrial locomotion, although some perform benthos-like limbless locomotion using body surface projections such as scales and setae. Some terrestrial animals even have wings or membranes that act as airfoils to generate lift, allowing them to fly and/or glide as airborne animals.

In a narrower sense, the word "terrestrial" is used to specifically describe animals that live on the ground (particularly epigeal species living obligately on top of the topsoil surface), as opposed to arboreal animals that live in trees, even though trees, like the shrubs and groundcovers from the lower floral layers, are all an integral component of the terrestrial ecosystem.

== Ecological subgroups ==
The term "terrestrial", in a more specific sense, is typically applied to ground species that are epigeal (living primarily above the topsoil) or fossorial (living in burrows within the soil), in contrast to arboreal species, who live primarily up in trees, even though the latter are actually a specialized subgroup of the terrestrial fauna.

There are other less common terms that apply to specific subgroups of terrestrial animals:

- Nemoral — organisms that live in woodland habitats (forests, groves or shrublands) with significant canopy shading.
- Riparian — organisms that live in the waterside woodlands/wet meadows on the bank of a waterbody.
- Saxicolous — organisms that live among rocks and gravels
- Arenicolous — organisms that live in the sand.
- Troglofauna — organisms that predominantly live in caves.
- Xerocolous— organisms that live in arid desert habitats.
- Saproxylic — organisms that live inside coarse woody debris.

== Taxonomy ==
Terrestrial invasion is one of the most important events in the history of life. Terrestrial lineages evolved in several animal phyla, among which arthropods, vertebrates and mollusks are representatives of more successful groups of terrestrial animals.

Terrestrial animals do not form a unified clade; rather, they are a polyphyletic group that share only the fact that they live on land. The transition from an aquatic to terrestrial life by various groups of animals has occurred independently and successfully many times. Most terrestrial lineages originated under a mild or tropical climate during the Paleozoic and Mesozoic, whereas few animals became fully terrestrial during the Cenozoic.

If internal parasites are excluded, eleven phyla include free living species in terrestrial environments. These can be grouped as follows:

Three phyla contain species that have adapted totally to dry terrestrial environments, and which have no aquatic phase in their life cycles:

- Arthropods — fully terrestrial members: hexapods (crown group being insects), arachnids, myriapods, and some land-evolved crustaceans such as woodlice, sandhoppers, coconut crab and terrestrial crabs; semi-terrestrial members include most species of crabs, crayfish, water fleas, copepods, and seed shrimp
- Molluscs — mainly terrestrial gastropods: land snails and slugs; one species of coleoid cephalopod, the algae octopus, is also known to be routinely terrestrial
- Chordates — specifically tetrapod vertebrates (especially amniotes); semiterrestrial members: non-caecilian amphibians (frogs and salamanders) and amphibious fish

Four phyla include species that depend on more or less moist habitats:

- Annelids — mainly oligochaete clitellates such as earthworms, pot worms and some leeches, but require moist soil habitats, highly diverse and derived from their marine relatives
- Onychophorans (velvet worms) — the only solely terrestrial phylum, though require moist habitats and have restricted range
- Platyhelminthes (flatworms) — specifically land planarians, require moist habitats and have restricted range
- Nemerteans (ribbon worms) — specifically the 12 terrestrial species from the suborder Monostilifera, require moist habitats and have restricted range

Species in four more phyla, as well as some smaller species of arthropods and annelids, are microscopic animals that require a film of water to live in, and are therefore considered semi-terrestrial:

- Gastrotrichs (hairy-backs) — live in transient terrestrial water and go dormant during desiccation
- Rotifers (wheel animals) — live in transient terrestrial water and go dormant during desiccation
- Nematodes (roundworms) — mostly parasitic but some (e.g. Caenorhabditis) are free-living detritivores, live in topsoil and go dormant during desiccation
- Tardigrades (water bears) — live in transient terrestrial water and go dormant during desiccation

=== Difficulties ===
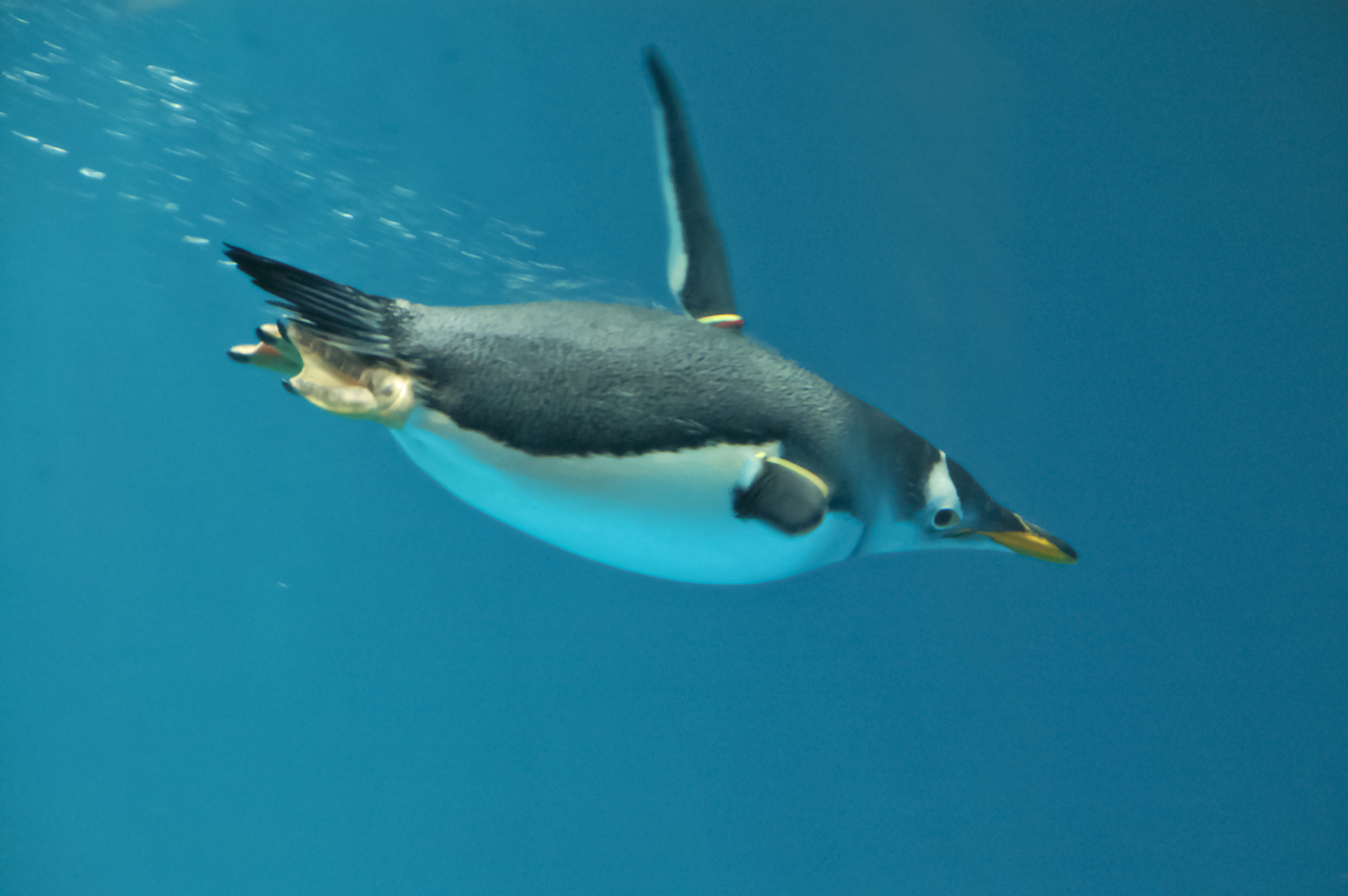
Animals do not fall neatly into terrestrial or aquatic classification but lie along a continuum: e.g., penguins spend much of their time under water.

Labeling an animal species "terrestrial" or "aquatic" is often obscure and becomes a matter of judgment. Many animals considered terrestrial have a life-cycle that is partly dependent on being in water. Penguins, seals, and walruses sleep on land and feed in the ocean, yet they are all considered terrestrial. Many insects, e.g. mosquitos, and all terrestrial crabs, as well as other clades, have an aquatic life cycle stage: their eggs need to be laid in and to hatch in water; after hatching, there is an early aquatic form, either a nymph or larva.

There are crab species that are completely aquatic, crab species that are amphibious, and crab species that are terrestrial. Fiddler crabs are called "semi-terrestrial" since they make burrows in the muddy substrate, to which they retreat during high tides. When the tide is out, fiddler crabs search the beach for food. The same is true in the mollusca. Many hundreds of gastropod genera and species live in intermediate situations, such as for example, Truncatella. Some gastropods with gills live on land, and others with a lung live in the water.

As well as the purely terrestrial and the purely aquatic animals, there are many borderline species. There are no universally accepted criteria for deciding how to label these species, thus some assignments are disputed.

== Terrestrial panarthropods ==
Fossil evidence has shown that sea creatures, likely arthropods, first began to make forays onto land around 530 million years ago, in the Early Cambrian. There is little reason to believe, however, that animals first began living permanently on land around that time. A more likely hypothesis is that these early arthropods' motivation for venturing onto dry land was to mate (as modern horseshoe crabs do) or to lay eggs out of the reach of predators.

Three groups of arthropods had independently adapted to land by the end of the Cambrian: myriapods, hexapods and arachnids. By the late Ordovician, they may have fully terrestrialized. There are other groups of arthropods, all from malacostracan crustaceans, which independently became terrestrial at a later date: woodlice, sandhoppers, and terrestrial crabs. Additionally, the sister panarthropodan groups Onychophora (velvet worms) are also terrestrial, while the Eutardigrada are also adapted for land to some degree; both groups probably becoming so during the Early Devonian. Among arthropods, many microscopic crustacean groups like copepods and amphipods and seed shrimp can go dormant when dry and live in transient bodies of water.

== Vertebrate terrestrialization ==
By approximately 375 million years ago the bony fish best adapted to life in shallow coastal/swampy waters (such as Tiktaalik roseae). Thanks to relatively strong, muscular limbs (which were likely weight-bearing, thus making them a preferable alternative to traditional fins in extremely shallow water), and lungs which existed in conjunction with gills, Tiktaalik and animals like it were able to establish a strong foothold on land by the end of the Devonian period. In the Carboniferous, tetrapods (losing their gills) became fully terrestrialized, allowing their expansion into most terrestrial niches, though later on some will return to being aquatic and conquer the air also.

== Terrestrial gastropods ==
Gastropod mollusks are one of the most successful animals that have diversified in the fully terrestrial habitat. They have evolved terrestrial taxa in more than nine lineages. They are commonly referred to as land snails and slugs.

Terrestrial invasion of gastropod mollusks has occurred in Neritopsina, Cyclophoroidea, Littorinoidea, Rissooidea, Ellobioidea, Onchidioidea, Veronicelloidea, Succineoidea, and Stylommatophora, and in particular, each of Neritopsina, Rissooidea and Ellobioidea has likely achieved land invasion more than once.

Most terrestrialization events have occurred during the Paleozoic or Mesozoic. Gastropods are especially unique due to several fully terrestrial and epifaunal lineages that evolved during the Cenozoic. Some members of rissooidean families Truncatellidae, Assimineidae, and Pomatiopsidae are considered to have colonized land during the Cenozoic. Most truncatellid and assimineid snails amphibiously live in intertidal and supratidal zones from brackish water to pelagic areas. Terrestrial lineages likely evolved from such ancestors. The rissooidean gastropod family Pomatiopsidae is one of the few groups that have evolved fully terrestrial taxa during the late Cenozoic in the Japanese archipelago only. Shifts from aquatic to terrestrial life occurred at least twice within two Japanese endemic lineages in Japanese Pomatiopsidae and it started in the Late Miocene.

About one-third of gastropod species are terrestrial. In terrestrial habitats they are subjected to daily and seasonal variation in temperature and water availability. Their success in colonizing different habitats is due to physiological, behavioral, and morphological adaptations to water availability, as well as ionic and thermal balance. They are adapted to most of the habitats on Earth. The shell of a snail is constructed of calcium carbonate, but even in acidic soils one can find various species of shell-less slugs. Land-snails, such as Xerocrassa seetzeni and Sphincterochila boissieri, also live in deserts, where they must contend with heat and aridity. Terrestrial gastropods are primarily herbivores and only a few groups are carnivorous. Carnivorous gastropods usually feed on other gastropod species or on weak individuals of the same species; some feed on insect larvae or earthworms.

== Semi-terrestrial animals ==
Semi-terrestrial animals are macroscopic animals that rely on very moist environments to thrive, they may be considered a transitional point between true terrestrial animals and aquatic animals. Among vertebrates, amphibians have this characteristic relying on a moist environment and breathing through their moist skin while reproducing in water.

Many other animal groups solely have terrestrial animals that live like this: land planarians, land ribbon worms, roundworms (nematodes), and land annelids (clitellates) who are very primitive and breathe through skin.

Clitellates or terrestrial annelids demonstrate many unique terrestrial adaptations especially in their methods of reproduction, they tend towards being simpler than their marine relatives, the bristleworms, lacking many of the complex appendages the latter have.

Velvet worms are prone to desiccation not due to breathing through their skin but due to their spiracles being inefficient at protecting from desiccation, like clitellates they demonstrate extensive terrestrial adaptations and differences from their marine relatives including live birth.

== Geoplankton ==
Many animals live in terrestrial environments by thriving in transient often microscopic bodies of water and moisture, these include rotifers and gastrotrichs which lay resilient eggs capable of surviving years in dry environments, and some of which can go dormant themselves. Nematodes are usually microscopic with this lifestyle. Although eutardigrades only have lifespans of a few months, they famously can enter suspended animation during dry or hostile conditions and survive for decades, which allows them to be ubiquitous in terrestrial environments despite needing water to grow and reproduce. Many microscopic crustacean groups like copepods and amphipods and seed shrimps are known to go dormant when dry and live in transient bodies of water too.

== See also ==
- Aquatic animal
- Aquatic ecosystem
- Aquatic locomotion
- Aquatic mammal
- Aquatic plant
- Marine invertebrates
- Marine mammal
- Terrestrial
- Terrestrial ecosystem
- Terrestrial locomotion
- Terrestrial plant
- Wetland – Ecosystem that is flooded or saturated with water
- Wetland indicator status
- Zoology
