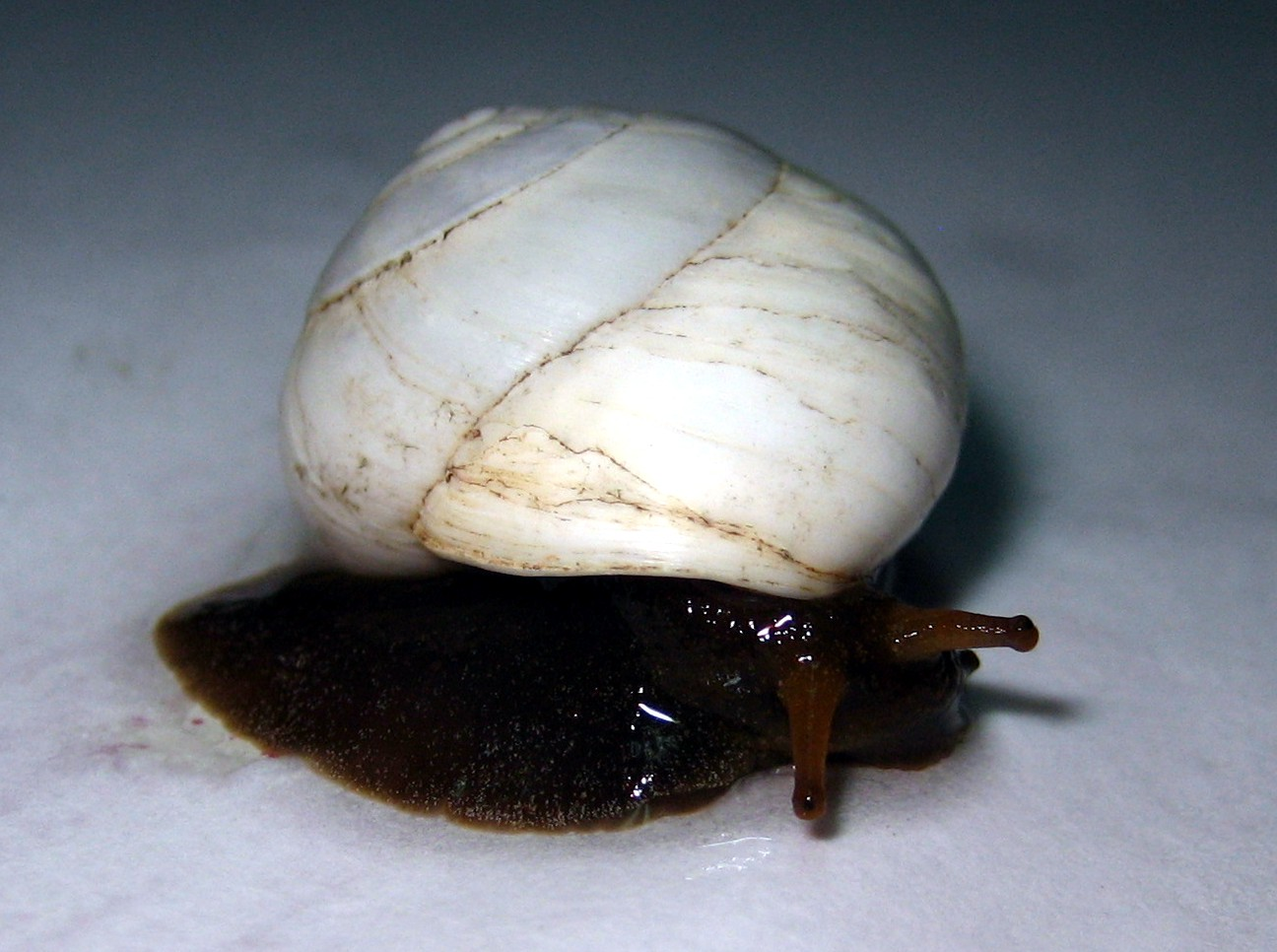
- Sphincterochila candidissima, near Tortosa

Scientific classification
- Kingdom: Animalia
- Phylum: Mollusca
- Class: Gastropoda
- Order: Stylommatophora
- Suborder: Helicina
- Infraorder: Helicoidei
- Superfamily: Helicoidea
- Family: Sphincterochilidae; Zilch, 1960 (1910)

= Sphincterochilidae =

Family of gastropods

Sphincterochilidae is a taxonomic family of medium-sized air-breathing land snails, terrestrial pulmonate gastropod mollusks in the superfamily Helicoidea (according to the taxonomy of the Gastropoda by Bouchet & Rocroi, 2005).

In the fossil record, Sphincterochilidae are known from the upper Eocene to the Holocene.

== Distribution ==
The distribution of Sphincterochilidae includes the western-Palearctic zone.

== Taxonomy ==
The following two subfamilies have been recognized in the taxonomy of Bouchet & Rocroi (2005):

- subfamily Sphincterochilinae Zilch, 1960 (1910) - synonyms: Calcarinidae Pallary, 1909 (inv.); Albeidae Pallary, 1910. Sphincterochilidae is a conserved name to take the priority of Leucochroidae Westerlund, 1886.
- subfamily † Pseudoleptaxinae H. Nordsieck, 1986

== Genera ==
Genera within the family Sphincterochilidae include:

Sphincterochilinae

- † Asensidea Calzada, 2003
- Sphincterochila Ancey, 1887 - type genus of the family Sphincterochilidae

† Pseudoleptaxinae

- † Dentellocaracolus Oppenheim, 1890
- † Fridolinia Pilsbry, 1895 †
- † Pseudoleptaxis Pilsbry, 1895 - type genus o the subfamily Pseudoleptaxinae
- † Wenzia Pfeffer, 1930

== Ecology ==
Sphincterochilidae land snails are xerothermophilous, i.e. they are well adapted to hot, arid places.
