= List of non-marine molluscs of Libya =

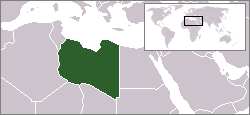
Location of Libya

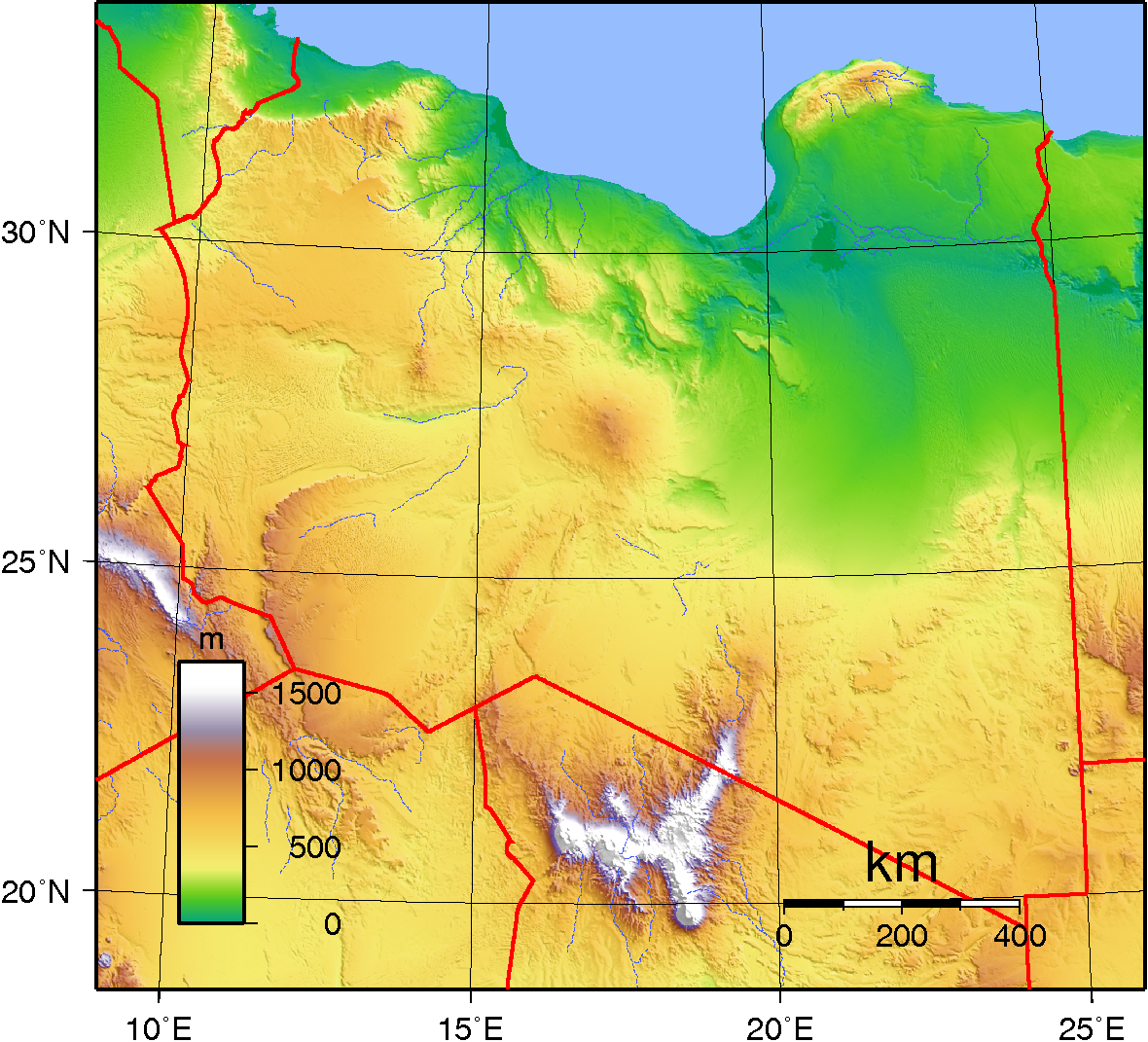
topography of Libya

The non-marine molluscs of Libya are a part of the molluscan fauna of Libya (wildlife of Libya).

A number of species of non-marine molluscs are found in the wild in Libya.

== Freshwater gastropods ==
Thiaridae

- Melanoides tuberculata (O. F. Müller, 1774)

== Land gastropods ==
Land gastropods in Libya include:

Veronicellidae

- Eleutherocaulis striatus (Simroth, 1896)

Parmacellidae

- Parmacella alexandrina Ehrenberg, 1831
- Parmacella cfr. deshayesi Moquin-Tandon, 1848
- Parmacella festae Gambetta, 1925
- Parmacella olivieri Cuvier, 1804

Agriolimacidae

- Deroceras barceum (Gambetta, 1924)

Limacidae

- Ambigolimax valentianus (A. Ferussac, 1822)
- Malacolimax tenellus O. F. Müller, 1774 - lemon slug

Milacidae

- Tandonia rustica (Millet, 1843)
- Tandonia sowerbyi (Férussac, 1823)

Polygyridae

- Polygyra cereolus (Megerle von Mühlgeldt, 1818) - southern flatcoil

Hygromiidae

- Monacha obstructa (L. Pfeiffer, 1842)

== See also ==
Lists of molluscs of surrounding countries:

- List of non-marine molluscs of Egypt, Wildlife of Egypt
- List of non-marine molluscs of Sudan, Wildlife of Sudan
- List of non-marine molluscs of Chad, Wildlife of Chad
- List of non-marine molluscs of Niger, Wildlife of Niger
- List of non-marine molluscs of Algeria, Wildlife of Algeria
- List of non-marine molluscs of Tunisia, Wildlife of Tunisia

oversea countries:

- List of non-marine molluscs of Greece, Wildlife of Greece
- List of non-marine molluscs of Italy, Wildlife of Italy
- List of non-marine molluscs of Malta, Wildlife of Malta
