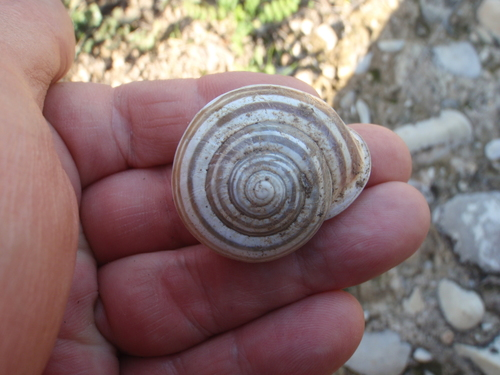
- Apical view of shell

Scientific classification
- Kingdom: Animalia
- Phylum: Mollusca
- Class: Gastropoda
- Order: Stylommatophora
- Family: Helicidae
- Genus: Eobania
- Species: E. constantina

Binomial name
- Eobania constantina Forbes, 1838

Synonyms
- Helix constantina E. Forbes, 1838; Massylaea constantina (E. Forbes, 1838); Helix constantinae Bourguignat, 1863; Helix constantinae var. bifasciata Bourguignat, 1863; Helix constantinae var. conoidea Bourguignat, 1863; Helix constantinae var. depressa Bourguignat, 1863; Helix constantinae var. maxima Bourguignat, 1863; Helix constantinae var. minima Bourguignat, 1863; Helix constantinae var. trifasciatav Bourguignat Helix boghariensis; Debeaux, 1857 Helix cirtae; Terver, 1839

= Eobania constantina =

Species of land snail

Eobania constantina is a species of terrestrial land snail in the family Helicidae, native to northern Algeria and other parts of North Africa. It occurs primarily in Mediterranean environments, ranging from humid coastal regions to more semi-arid inland areas, and inhabits a variety of habitats, from remote mountainous regions to urban areas. As a member of Helicidae, it possesses a coiled shell and hermaphroditic reproductive system, with both shell morphology and genital anatomy playing important roles in its classification.

== Distribution and habitat ==
Eobania constantina, and terrestrial helicid snails in general, are typically found close to the Mediterranean coast, ranging from the more humid areas near the coast to the semi-arid climate closer to the Sahara. The species is found in high abundance in Northeastern Algeria, particularly in the Kebir Rhumel basin, where it has been identified in provinces such as Mila, Constantine, Jijel, Sétif, and Oum El Bouaghi. It was also recorded further west within the Tizi Ouzou region in Kabylie as well as within the regions of Boumerdes and Algiers, and is particularly abundant in the Chettaba forest massif. It inhabits many elevations, with observations ranging from regions at sea level to more mountainous regions at ~1700 feet above sea level.

== Description ==
=== Shell morphology ===
E. constantina has a medium to large shell size, with a dextral, or right-hand, coil. There is a large protoconch and an aperture with a raised columellar ridge. The last, rounded whorl is the largest, taking up most of the shell and diminishing rapidly as it reaches the aperture. There is a thick, white peristome, along with a reflexed lip and closed umbilicus.

The shell is a white or silvery color with a spire containing four to five brown bands, with thick walls and a smooth teleoconch and protoconch. The species can be differentiated from Eobania vermiculata by the absence of malleations on the surface of its shell. Shell height ranges from around 1.66 to 2.25 cm, and shell diameter ranges from around 2.61 to 3.72 cm, or respectively 2.1 to 2.5 cm height and 2.6 to 3.2 cm diameter, dependent on source.

=== Reproductive anatomy ===
Like many terrestrial snails, E. constantina is hermaphroditic. The genital organs and anatomy of the male-side part include a penis, epiphallus, and a flagellum. The penis consists of three different parts: an elongated distal tube that is connected to the atrium and a muscular part with two lobes separated internally by a ring-shaped pad. The epiphallus, covered by a penial retractor muscle, is longer than the penis and is connected to the atrium via a fascicle, or a small bundle of muscle fibers. The flagellum is an extension of the reproductive tract, and is a long, simple tube. Inside, the proximal penial chamber is filled by a solid penial papilla, and the epiphallus opens into the penial chamber via a small pore.

== Taxonomy ==
=== Taxonomic history ===
One of the earliest formal records of land snails in Algeria comes from Edward Forbes' 19th‑century work, which described terrestrial mollusks collected around Algiers and Béjaïa. These early catalogs provided the first taxonomic baselines for Algerian helicids, often based solely on shell morphology. During this era, collection was driven by European naturalists working in French colonial territories. This period saw the naming and description of many nominal taxa, some of which were later revised. Helix constantina was first described by Forbes in 1838.

Taxonomic history in Algerian helicids has been complex due to morphological variation and changing genera. In particular, misinterpretations of shell morphology led researchers to mix up Massylaea and Eobania species and caused disagreements over the true classification of helicids like E. constantina. However, molecular and anatomical work revealed that the genital morphology of Massylaea species matches that considered typical of Eobania, leading to the suggestion that Eobania should be referred to as Massylaea.

Early mollusc records, like those by Forbes and Terver, were written and compiled during the period of French occupation in Algeria, where French scientists were the main drivers of fieldwork and species description. Reliance on European collections and morphological features alone led to a surplus of nominal taxa and confusion that later studies had to resolve using genital anatomy and genetics. Reproductive anatomy provides a more reliable basis for telling taxa apart in Helicidae. Features such as the shape and structure of the penis, epiphallus, penial papillae, and arrangement of the gametolytic sac are distinctive among these helicids, allowing taxonomists to differentiate Massylaea from other North African helicids even when shell morphology overlaps. Molecular phylogenetic analyses, using both mitochondrial and nuclear markers, have further confirmed these relationships and clarified historical taxonomic confusion caused by shell-based misidentifications.
