= Parmacella festae =

Scientific classification
- Domain: Eukaryota
- Kingdom: Animalia
- Phylum: Mollusca
- Class: Gastropoda
- Order: Stylommatophora
- Family: Parmacellidae
- Genus: Parmacella
- Species: P. festae

Binomial name
- Parmacella festae Gambetta, 1925

Species of gastropod

Parmacella festae is a species of air-breathing land snail, a terrestrial pulmonate gastropod mollusk in the family Parmacellidae.

== Distribution ==
The distribution of this species includes:

- Northern Egypt
- Northern Libya

== Description ==
The animal is an evenly light ochreous cream in color. The mantle is up to 30 mm long. The whole animal is up to 55 mm long.

The shell has a thick and golden-yellow apex which is covered with minute pits regularly arranged in spiral rows (only visible under magnification when the shell is dried).
