= Parmacella gervaisii =

Conservation status
- Extinct

Scientific classification
- Domain: Eukaryota
- Kingdom: Animalia
- Phylum: Mollusca
- Class: Gastropoda
- Order: Stylommatophora
- Family: Parmacellidae
- Genus: Parmacella
- Species: †P. gervaisii

Binomial name
- †Parmacella gervaisii Moquin-Tandon, 1850

Extinct species of gastropod

Parmacella gervaisii is an extinct species of air-breathing land snail, a terrestrial pulmonate gastropod mollusk in the family Parmacellidae.

Parmacella gervaisii is considered to be extinct.

== Distribution ==
This species was endemic to the area near Arles, France.

== Description ==
The animal is brown with olive green hue. The shell is solid, greenish yellow, shiny, entirely opaque, concentrically striated, with 1.25 whorls, anterior part is 3 times larger than posterior part, rounded. The length of the shell is 11–12 mm. The width of the shell is 7 mm. The height of the shell is 2-2.3 mm.

== Ecology ==
It was observed to occur almost always in pairs in April.
