= Parmacella tenerifensis =

Drusia tenerifensis

Conservation status
- Endangered (IUCN 3.1)

Scientific classification
- Kingdom: Animalia
- Phylum: Mollusca
- Class: Gastropoda
- Order: Stylommatophora
- Family: Parmacellidae
- Genus: Parmacella
- Species: P. tenerifensis

Binomial name
- Parmacella tenerifensis Alonso, Ibanez & Diaz, 1985

Species of gastropod

Parmacella tenerifensis is a species of air-breathing land slug, a shell-less terrestrial gastropod mollusk in the family Parmacellidae.

This slug is listed as endangered species on the IUCN Red List of Threatened Species, but it is listed as Vulnerable species in the Red Book of Invertebrates of Spain.

== Description ==
This species is brown in color.

== Distribution ==
This species is endemic to the area east of San Cristóbal de La Laguna in Tenerife, Canary Islands.

== Ecology ==
This species inhabits ruderal biotopes.
