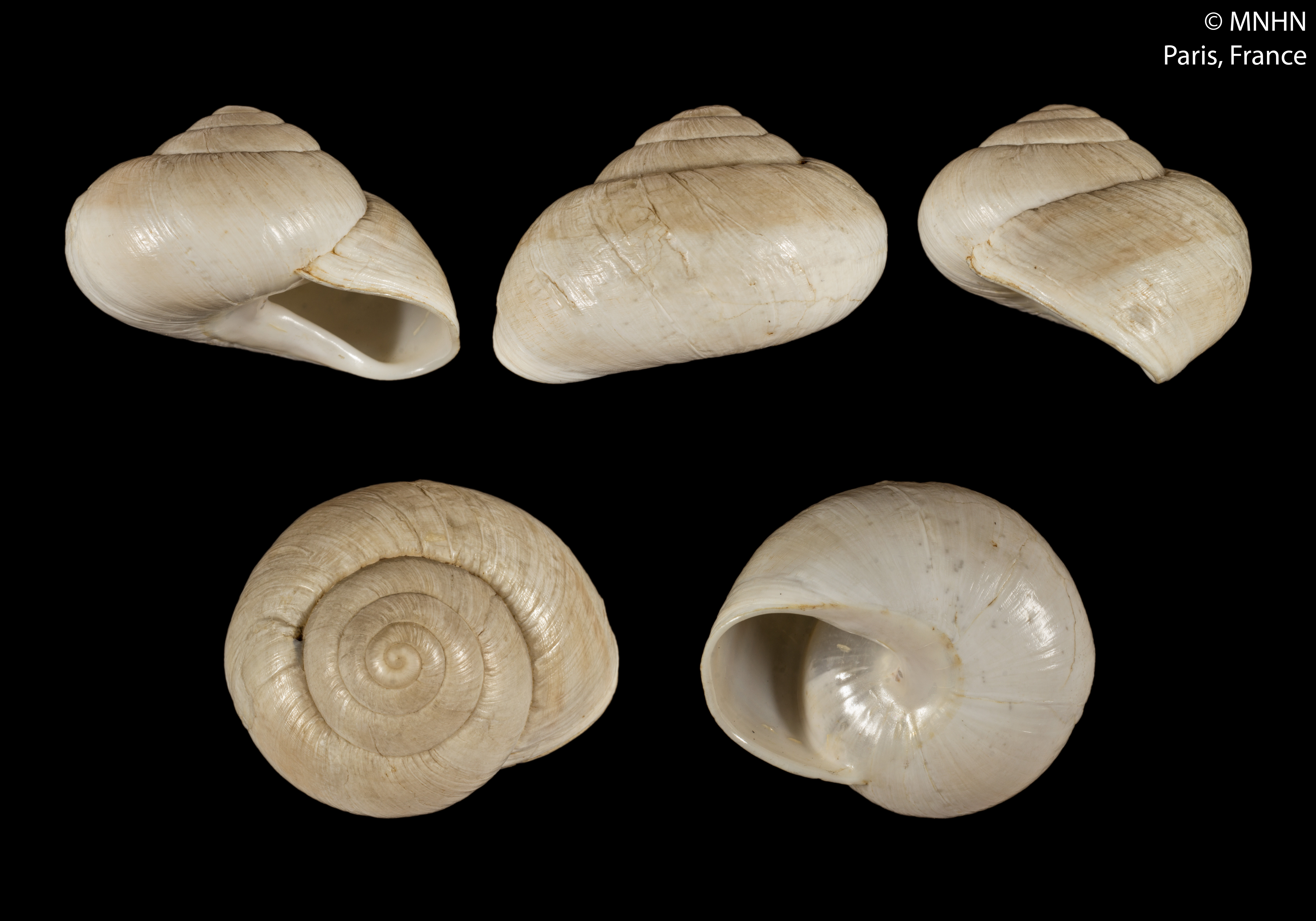
- Shell of Massylaea massylaea (syntype at MNHN, Paris)

Scientific classification
- Kingdom: Animalia
- Phylum: Mollusca
- Class: Gastropoda
- Order: Stylommatophora
- Family: Helicidae
- Subfamily: Helicinae
- Tribe: Thebini
- Genus: Massylaea; Möllendorff, 1898

Type species
- Helix massylaea Morelet, 1851

= Massylaea =

Genus of gastropods

Massylaea is a genus of air-breathing land snails, a pulmonate gastropod in the subfamily Helicinae of the family Helicidae, the typical snails.

It contains the following species:

- Massylaea massylaea (Morelet, 1851)
- Massylaea punica (Morelet, 1851)

Species brought into synonymy

- Massylaea bisseyana Pallary, 1933: synonym of Loxana rerayana (Mousson, 1873) (original combination)
- Massylaea bournazeliana Pallary, 1933: synonym of Loxana lechatelieri (Pallary, 1917) (original combination)
- Massylaea constantina (E. Forbes, 1838): synonym of Eobania constantina (E. Forbes, 1838)
- Massylaea derbesi Pallary, 1933: synonym of Loxana rerayana (Mousson, 1873) (original combination)
- Massylaea rerayana (Mousson, 1873): synonym of Loxana rerayana (Mousson, 1873) (superseded generic combination)
- Massylaea severinae Pallary, 1918: synonym of Loxana severinae (Pallary, 1918)
- Massylaea vermiculata (O. F. Müller, 1774): synonym of Eobania vermiculata (O. F. Müller, 1774)
