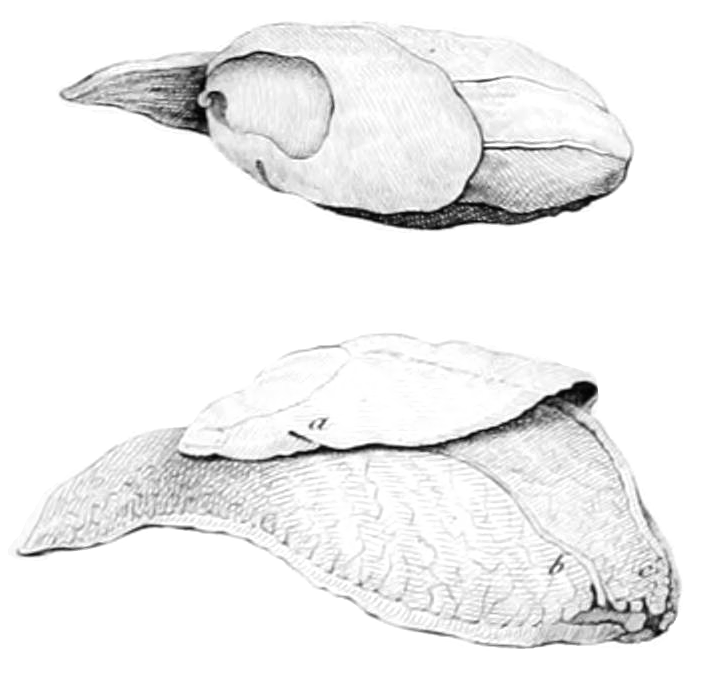
- Drawing of dorsal view and right lateral view of Parmacella olivieri from its type description by Georges Cuvier.

Scientific classification
- Domain: Eukaryota
- Kingdom: Animalia
- Phylum: Mollusca
- Class: Gastropoda
- Order: Stylommatophora
- Family: Parmacellidae
- Genus: Parmacella
- Species: P. olivieri

Binomial name
- Parmacella olivieri Cuvier, 1804

= Parmacella olivieri =

Species of gastropod

Parmacella olivieri is a species of air-breathing land slug, a terrestrial pulmonate gastropod mollusk in the family Parmacellidae.

Parmacella olivieri is the type species of the genus Parmacella.

== Distribution ==
The distribution of this species includes:

- Northern Egypt
- Northern Libya

== Description ==
The shell is very narrow, thick-walled. The apex is smooth and glossy amber golden. There are several tubercles and wrinkles in the aperture.

The animal is brown with chocolate brown bands on the mantle. The mantle is up to 20 mm long. The whole animal up to 32 mm long.

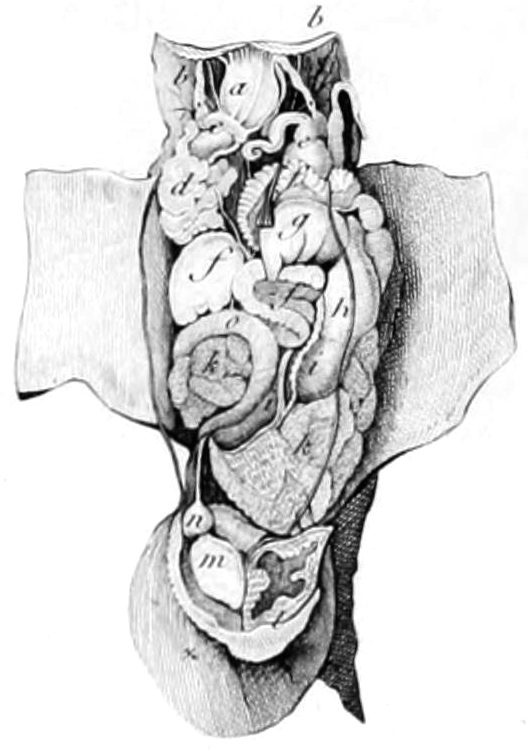
Drawing of anatomy of Parmacella olivieri from its type description.

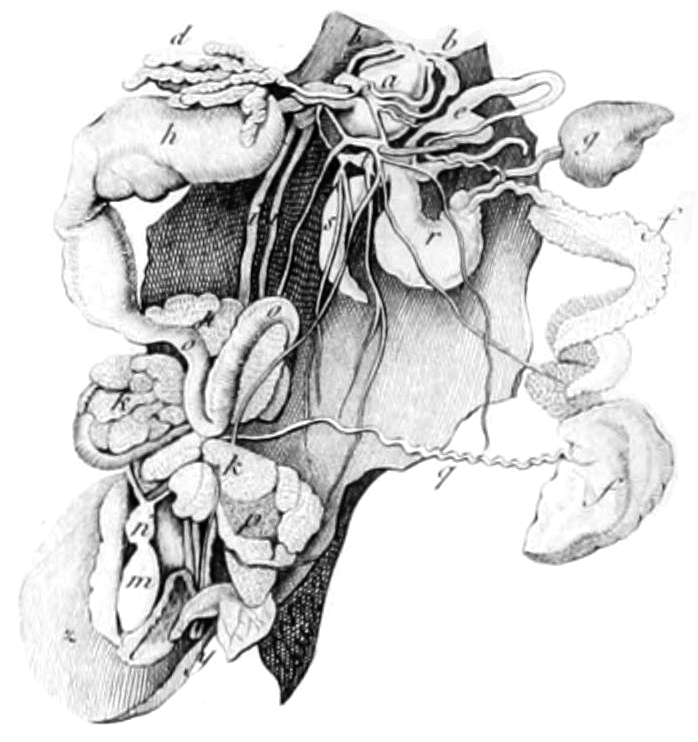
Drawing of anatomy of Parmacella olivieri from its type description.
