= List of non-marine molluscs of Egypt =

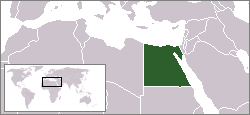
Location of Egypt

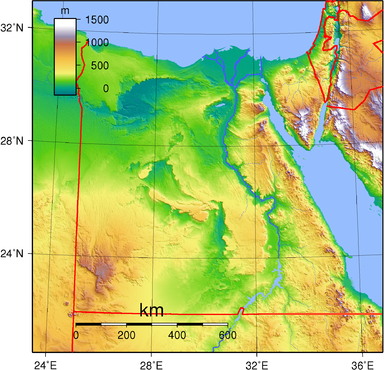
topography of Egypt

The non-marine molluscs of Egypt are a part of the molluscan fauna of Egypt (wildlife of Egypt).

A number of species of non-marine molluscs are found in the wild in Egypt.

== Freshwater gastropods ==
Neritidae

- Theodoxus niloticus (Reeve, 1856)

Viviparidae

- Bellamya unicolor (Olivier, 1804)

Ampullariidae

- Lanistes carinatus (Olivier, 1804)
- Pila ovata (Olivier, 1804)

Valvatidae

- Valvata nilotica Jickeli, 1874

Hydrobiidae

- Hydrobia musaensis Frauenfeld, 1855
- Ecrobia ventrosa (Montagu, 1803) - spire snail

Bithyniidae

- Gabbiella senaariensis (Küster, 1852)

Melanopsidae

- Melanopsis praemorsa (Linnaeus, 1758)

Potamididae

- Potamides conicus (de Blainville, 1829)

Physidae

- Haitia acuta (Draparnaud, 1805) - tadpole snail

Thiaridae

- Cleopatra bulimoides (Olivier, 1804)
- Cleopatra ferruginea (Lea & Lea, 1850)
- Melanoides tuberculata (O. F. Müller, 1774) - Malayan livebearing snail

Planorbidae

- Africanogyrus coretus (de Blainville, 1826)
- Biomphalaria alexandrina (Ehrenberg, 1831)
- hybrid Biomphalaria glabrata × Biomphalaria alexandrina
- Biomphalaria glabrata (Say, 1818)
- Bulinus forskalii (Ehrenberg, 1831)
- Bulinus truncatus (Audouin, 1827)
- Gyraulus costulatus (Krauss, 1848)
- Gyraulus ehrenbergi (Beck, 1837)
- Planorbella duryi (Wetherby, 1879) - seminole ramshorn
- Planorbis planorbis (Linnaeus, 1758)
- Segmentorbis angustus (Jickeli, 1874)

Lymnaeidae

- Galba truncatula (O. F. Müller, 1774)
- Galba schirazensis (Küster, 1863)
- Lymnaea stagnalis (Linnaeus, 1758) - great pond snail
- Pseudosuccinea columella (Say, 1817) - American ribbed fluke snail
- Radix natalensis (Krauss, 1848)

== Land gastropods ==
Land gastropods in Egypt include:

Succineidae

- Succinea cleopatra Pallary, 1909

Parmacellidae

- Parmacella festae Gambetta, 1925 - northern Egypt
- Parmacella olivieri Cuvier, 1804 - northern Egypt

Subulinidae

- Rumina decollata (Linnaeus, 1758) - decollate snail - non-indigenous
- Rumina saharica Pallary, 1901

Cochlicellidae

- Cochlicella acuta (Muller, 1774) - pointed snail

Ariophantidae

- Macrochlamys indica Benson, 1832 - horntail snail

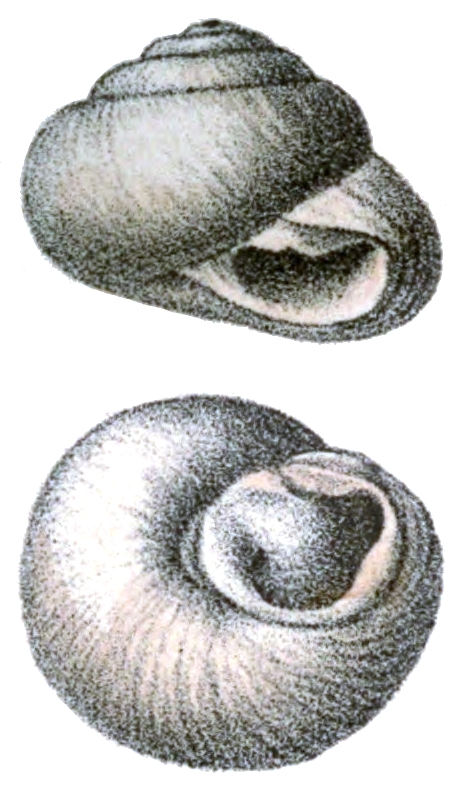
Shells of Sphincterochila boissieri

Sphincterochilidae

- Sphincterochila boissieri (Charpentier, 1847)

Pupillidae

- Pupoides coenopictus (Hutton, 1834)

Hygromiidae

- Monacha arbustorum
- Monacha cantiana (Montagu, 1803) - Kentish snail
- Monacha obstructa (Pfeiffer, 1842)
- Xerocrassa tanousi (Westerlund)
- Xerocrassa tuberculosa (Conrad, 1852)
- Xeropicta krynickii (Krynicki, 1833)
- Xeropicta vestalis (Pfeiffer, 1841)

Helicidae

- Cornu aspersum (O. F. Müller, 1774) - garden snail
- Eobania vermiculata (O. F. Müller, 1774) - chocolate-band snail
- Eremina desertorum (Forskål, 1775) - image (plate 95, figure 59)
- Eremina ehrenbergi (Roth, 1839)
- Helix pronuba Westerlund, 1879
- Theba pisana (Muller, 1774) - white garden snail

== Hothouse aliens ==
"Hothouse aliens" in Egypt include:

== See also ==
Lists of molluscs of surrounding countries:

- List of non-marine molluscs of Israel, Wildlife of Israel
- List of non-marine molluscs of Libya, Wildlife of Libya
- List of non-marine molluscs of Sudan, Wildlife of Sudan
