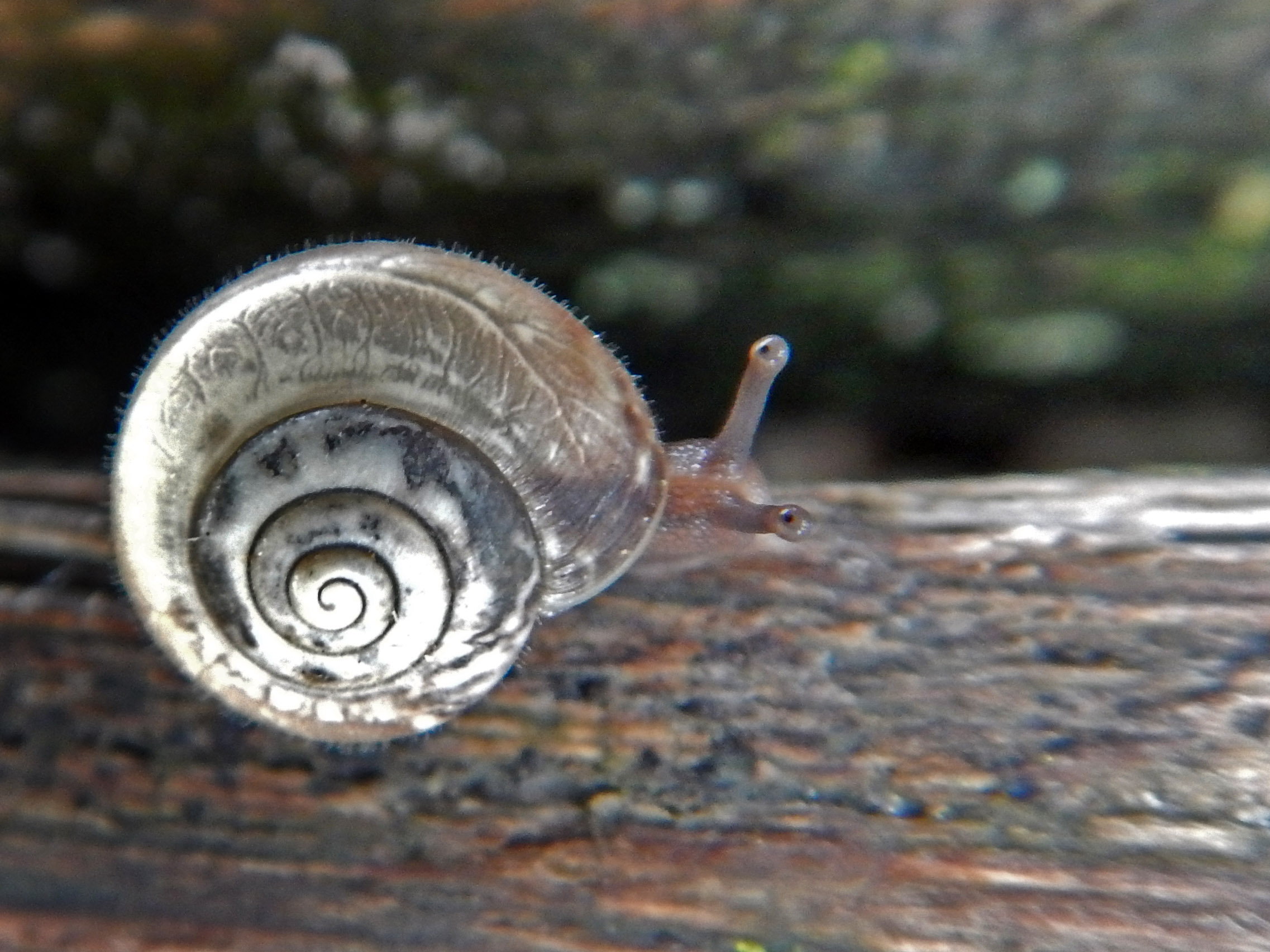
- Ashfordia granulata

Scientific classification
- Kingdom: Animalia
- Phylum: Mollusca
- Class: Gastropoda
- Order: Stylommatophora
- Family: Hygromiidae
- Genus: Ashfordia; Taylor, 1917

= Ashfordia =

Genus of gastropods

Ashfordia is a genus of small land snails, terrestrial pulmonate gastropod mollusks in the family Hygromiidae, the hairy snails.

This genus is sometimes not separated out from the genus Monacha.

== Species ==
Species in the genus Ashfordia include:

- Ashfordia granulata (Alder, 1830)
