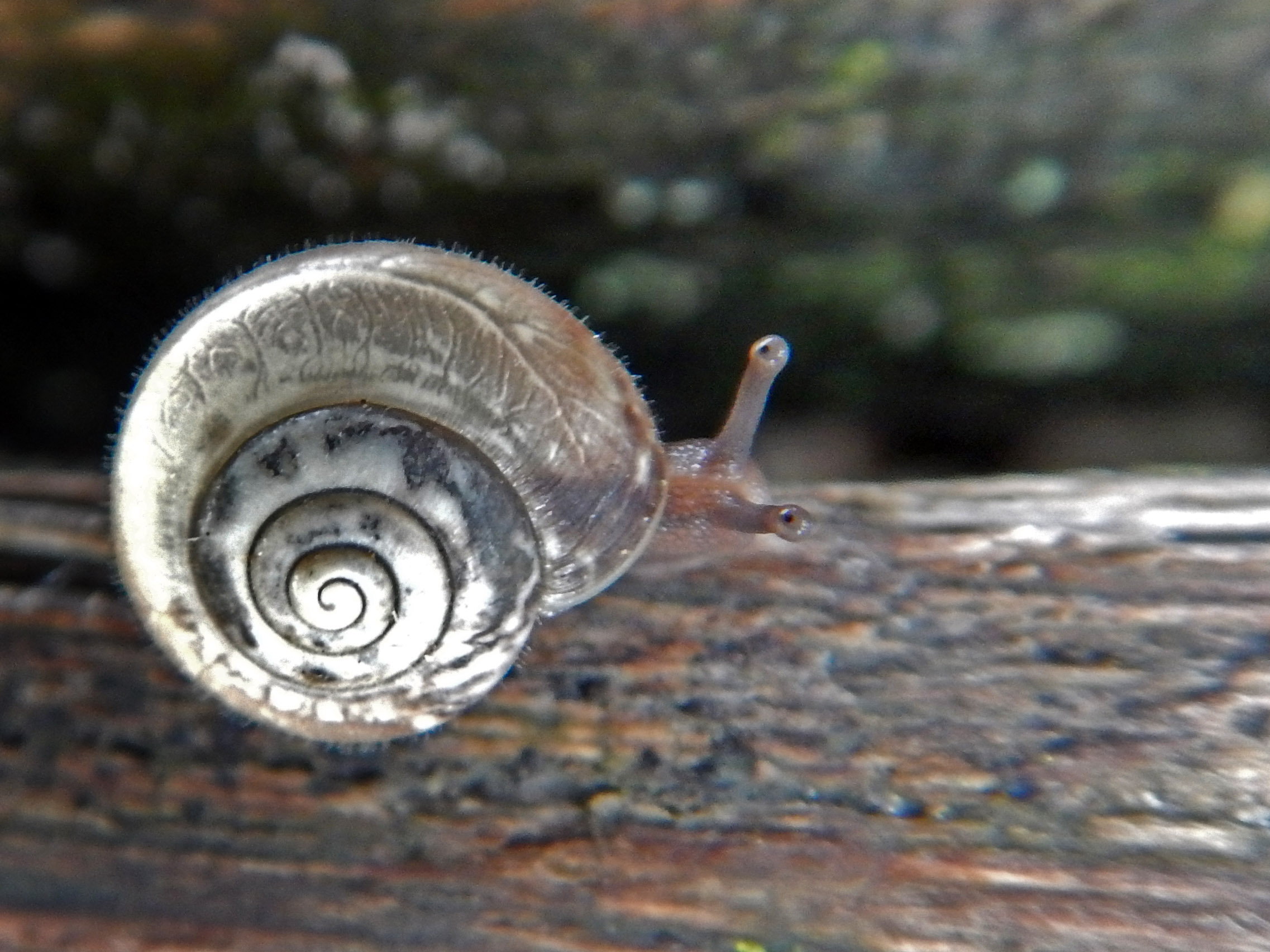

Conservation status
- Least Concern (IUCN 3.1)

Scientific classification
- Kingdom: Animalia
- Phylum: Mollusca
- Class: Gastropoda
- Order: Stylommatophora
- Family: Hygromiidae
- Genus: Ashfordia
- Species: A. granulata

Binomial name
- Ashfordia granulata (Alder, 1830)

= Ashfordia granulata =

Species of gastropod

Ashfordia granulata, common name the "silky snail", is a species of medium-sized air-breathing land snail, a terrestrial pulmonate gastropod mollusk in the family Hygromiidae, the hairy snails and their allies.

This species is sometimes placed in the genus Monacha and known as Monacha granulata.

== Distribution ==
This species is known to occur mainly in:

- Ireland
- Great Britain, England

with small populations in:

- France
- Spain

== Description ==
The 5-7 × 7-9 mm shell is whitish to pale brown and thin, translucent, with fine straight hairs with bulbous bases. There are 5.5-6 convex whorls with deep suture. The aperture is simple with a thin lip or without a lip. It is reflected only at the columellar side. The umbilicus is very narrow and partly covered by the reflected columellar margin. The mantle is with black spots.

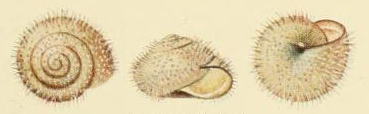
Ashfordia granulata shell

== Life cycle ==
The size of the egg is 1 mm.
