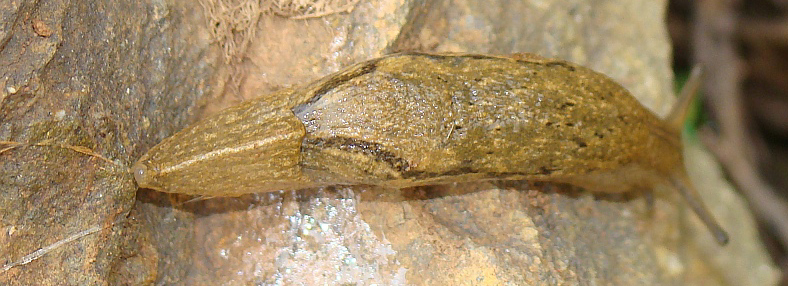
- Live individual of Parmacella valenciennii, head end towards the right

Scientific classification
- Kingdom: Animalia
- Phylum: Mollusca
- Class: Gastropoda
- Order: Stylommatophora
- Family: Parmacellidae
- Genus: Parmacella; Cuvier, 1804

= Parmacella =

Genus of gastropods

Parmacella is a genus of air-breathing land slugs, terrestrial gastropod mollusks in the family Parmacellidae.

Slugs within this genus create and use love darts.

== Species ==
Species within the genus Parmacella include:

- Cryptella canariensis Webb & Berthelot, 1833 / Parmacella canariensis (Webb & Berthelot, 1833)
- Parmacella deshayesi Moquin-Tandon, 1848
- Parmacella festae Gambetta, 1925
- Parmacella gervaisii Moquin-Tandon, 1850 - extinct
- Parmacella ibera Eichwald, 1841
- Parmacella olivieri Cuvier, 1804 - type species
- Parmacella tenerifensis Alonso, Ibanez & Diaz, 1985
- Parmacella valenciennii Webb & Van Beneden, 1836
