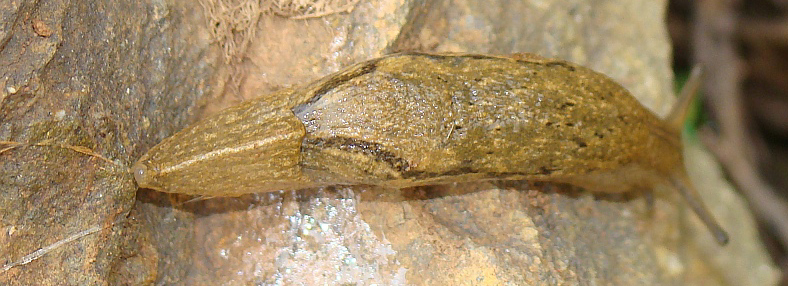
- A live individual of Parmacella valenciennii, head end towards the right

Scientific classification
- Domain: Eukaryota
- Kingdom: Animalia
- Phylum: Mollusca
- Class: Gastropoda
- Order: Stylommatophora
- Family: Parmacellidae
- Genus: Parmacella
- Species: P. valenciennii

Binomial name
- Parmacella valenciennii Webb & Vanbeneden, 1836

= Parmacella valenciennii =

Species of gastropod

Parmacella valenciennii is a species of air-breathing land slug, a terrestrial pulmonate gastropod mollusk in the family Parmacellidae.

== Distribution ==
The distribution of Parmacella valenciennii includes:

- Southern Portugal (south of Lisboa), It is very abundant in Alentejo.
- Spain
- Isolated area(s) in southern France

== Description ==
The animal is brownish red to brownish olive, with black bands on the mantle. Adult specimens are lighter. The body is sharply keeled in the posterior section. The mantle length in young animals is about 3/4 of the body length. The mantle is rounded in the anterior part and pointed in posterior part. The animal is up to 100 mm long, usually 70–80 mm long and 20 mm in width.

The shell is yellow, triangular, fragile and flat, with 1.5 whorls. The length of the shell is 15 mm, 9 mm in width and 2–3 mm high.

Parmacella valenciennii differs anatomically from all other Parmacella species by a single, characteristically horn-shaped and almost straight accessory atrial appendix.

== Ecology ==
Parmacella valenciennii lives in stony open habitats, preferring shady and humid sites between plants and stones. The animals move slowly.

There is a high abundance of these animals in the spring; the animals were so abundant that they were formerly used as pig food in southern Portugal.
