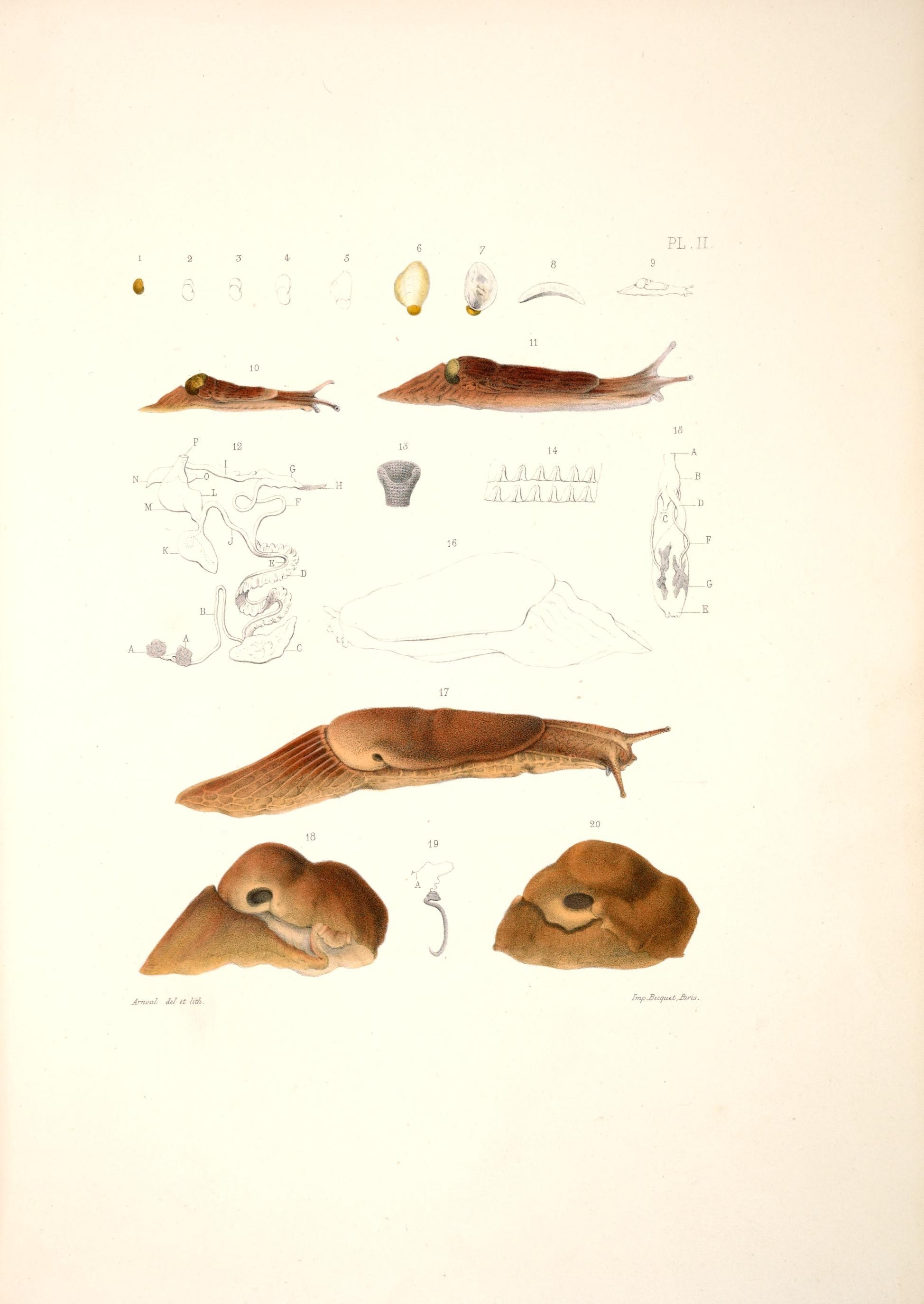

Scientific classification
- Kingdom: Animalia
- Phylum: Mollusca
- Class: Gastropoda
- Order: Stylommatophora
- Family: Parmacellidae
- Genus: Parmacella
- Species: P. deshayesi

Binomial name
- Parmacella deshayesi Moquin-Tandon, 1848

= Parmacella deshayesi =

Species of gastropod

Parmacella deshayesi is a species of air-breathing land snail, a terrestrial pulmonate gastropod mollusk in the family Parmacellidae.

== Distribution ==
Distribution of this species include:

- Algeria
- Morocco
- It could also occur in the Iberian Peninsula.

== Description ==
The animal is evenly brown, in the young animals sometimes with blackish streaks or spots. The mantle length is 55% of body. The size of preserved specimen is up to 60 mm.

The shell is thin-walled, delicate. The apex is completely smooth, yellow.

== Links ==
- Biodiversity Heritage Library - Bourguignat 1864, 1-20 - FREE IMAGES
