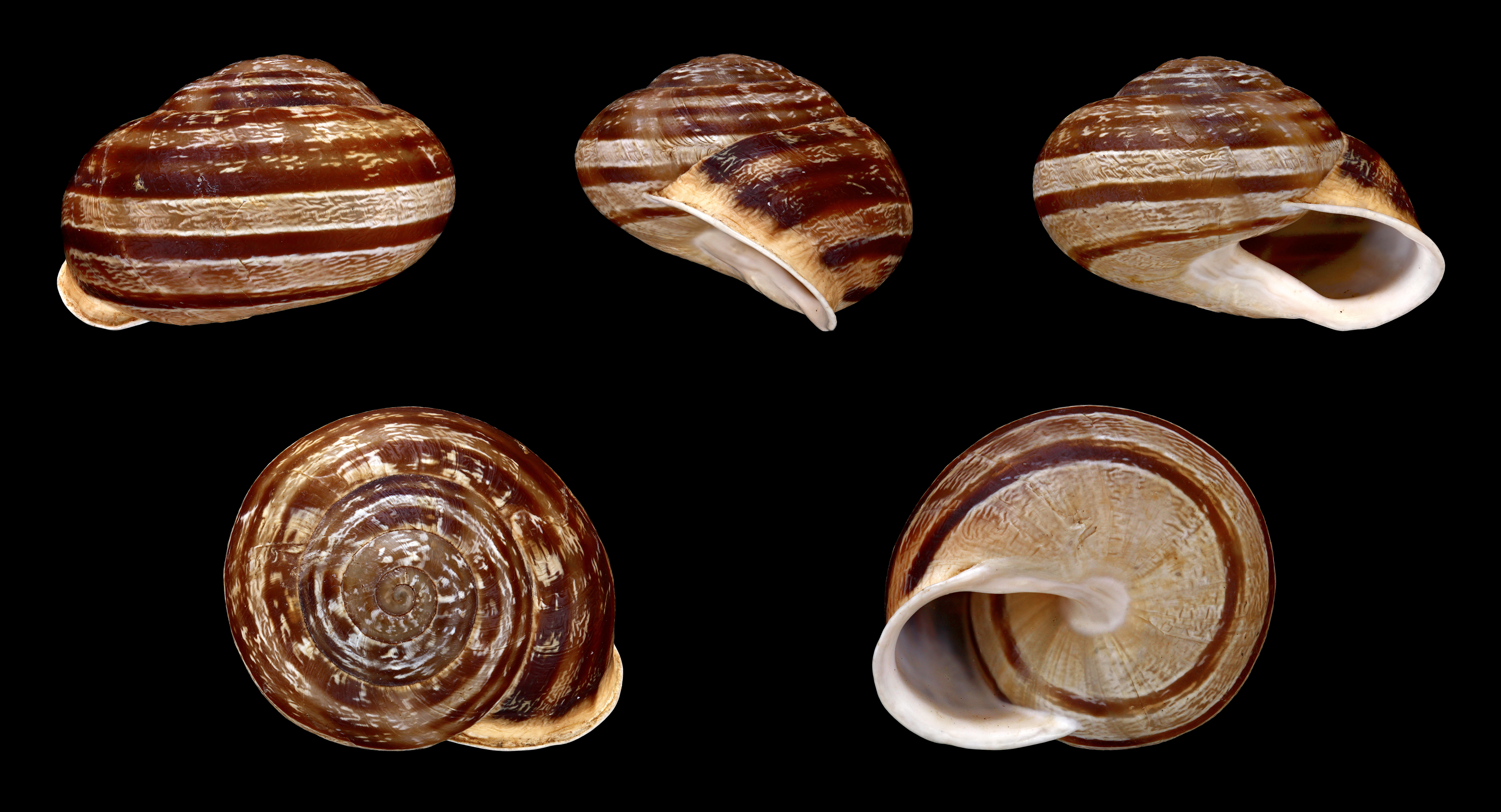
- Eobania vermiculata

Scientific classification
- Kingdom: Animalia
- Phylum: Mollusca
- Class: Gastropoda
- Order: Stylommatophora
- Family: Helicidae
- Subfamily: Helicinae
- Tribe: Helicini
- Genus: Eobania; Hesse, 1913

= Eobania =

Genus of gastropods

Eobania is a genus of large, air-breathing, land snails, terrestrial pulmonate gastropod mollusks in the family Helicidae, the true snails or typical snails.

== Species ==
The genus Eobania includes the following species:

- Eobania constantina (E. Forbes, 1838)
- Eobania vermiculata Müller, 1774 - type species

== Anatomy ==
These snails create and use love darts as part of their mating behavior.

== Distribution ==
This genus of snail occurs in the Mediterranean area.
