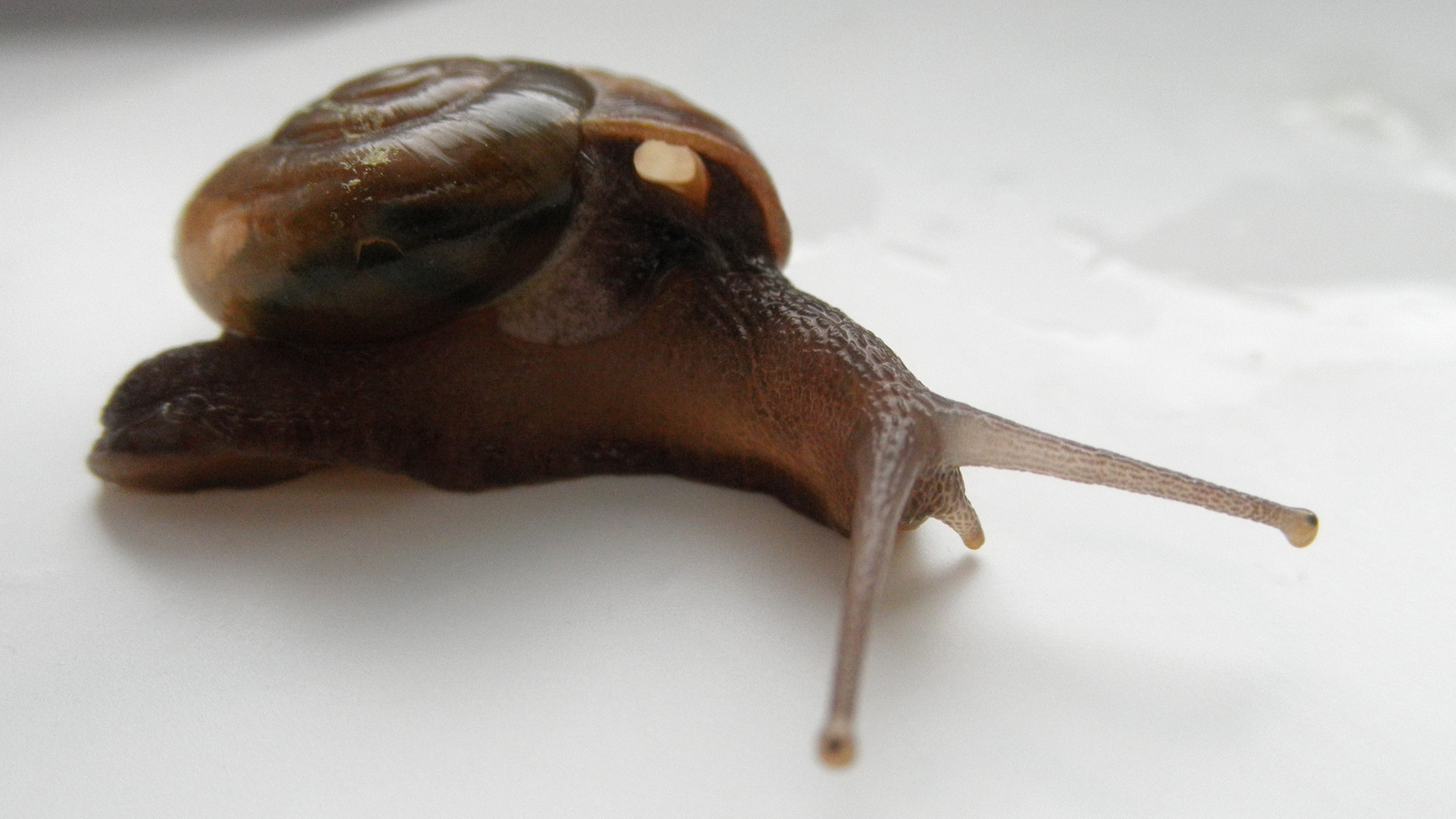

Scientific classification
- Kingdom: Animalia
- Phylum: Mollusca
- Class: Gastropoda
- Order: Stylommatophora
- Family: Ariophantidae
- Genus: Tanychlamys
- Species: T. amboinensis

Binomial name
- Tanychlamys amboinensis (von Martens, 1864)

Synonyms
- Hyalina amboinensis von Martens, 1864>; Macrochlamys amboinensis (von Martens, 1864)

= Tanychlamys amboinensis =

Species of gastropod

Tanychlamys amboinensis is a species of air-breathing land snail, a terrestrial pulmonate gastropod mollusk in the family Ariophantidae. The species has an extended mantle, the mantle collar, and caudal horn on the tail.

== Distribution ==
This species occurs in countries including:

- Vietnam
- Indonesia

== Description ==
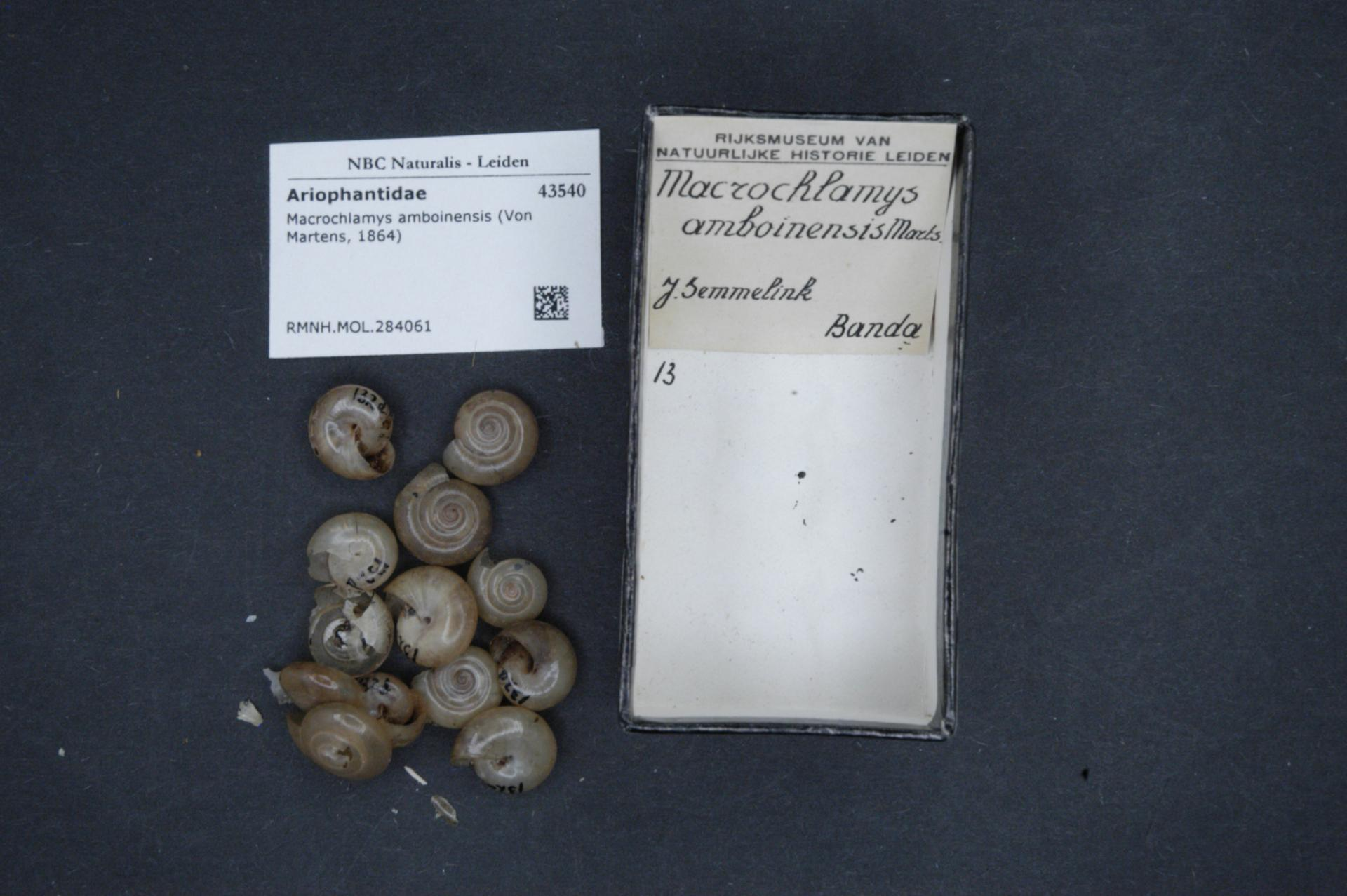
Shells.

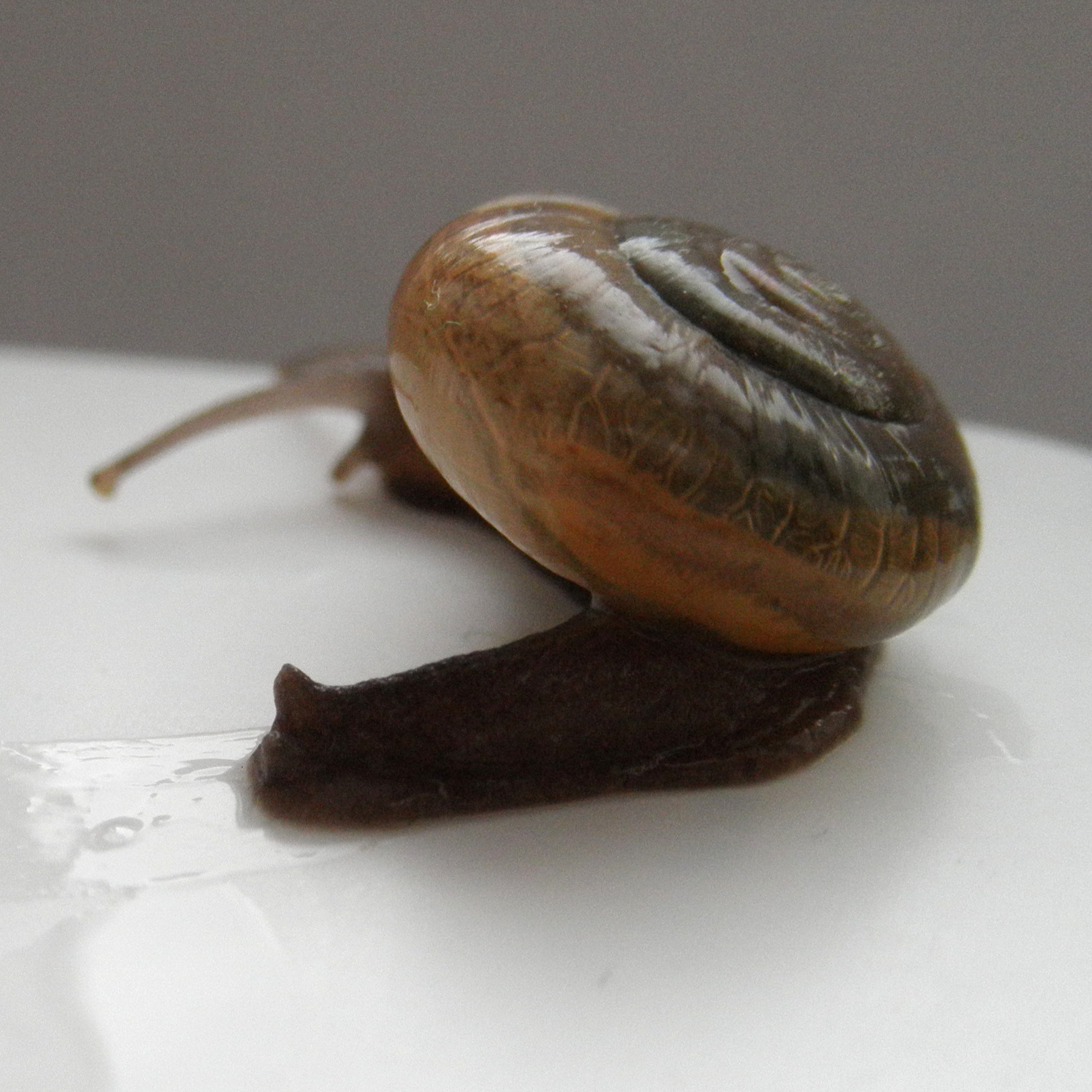
Caudal horn.

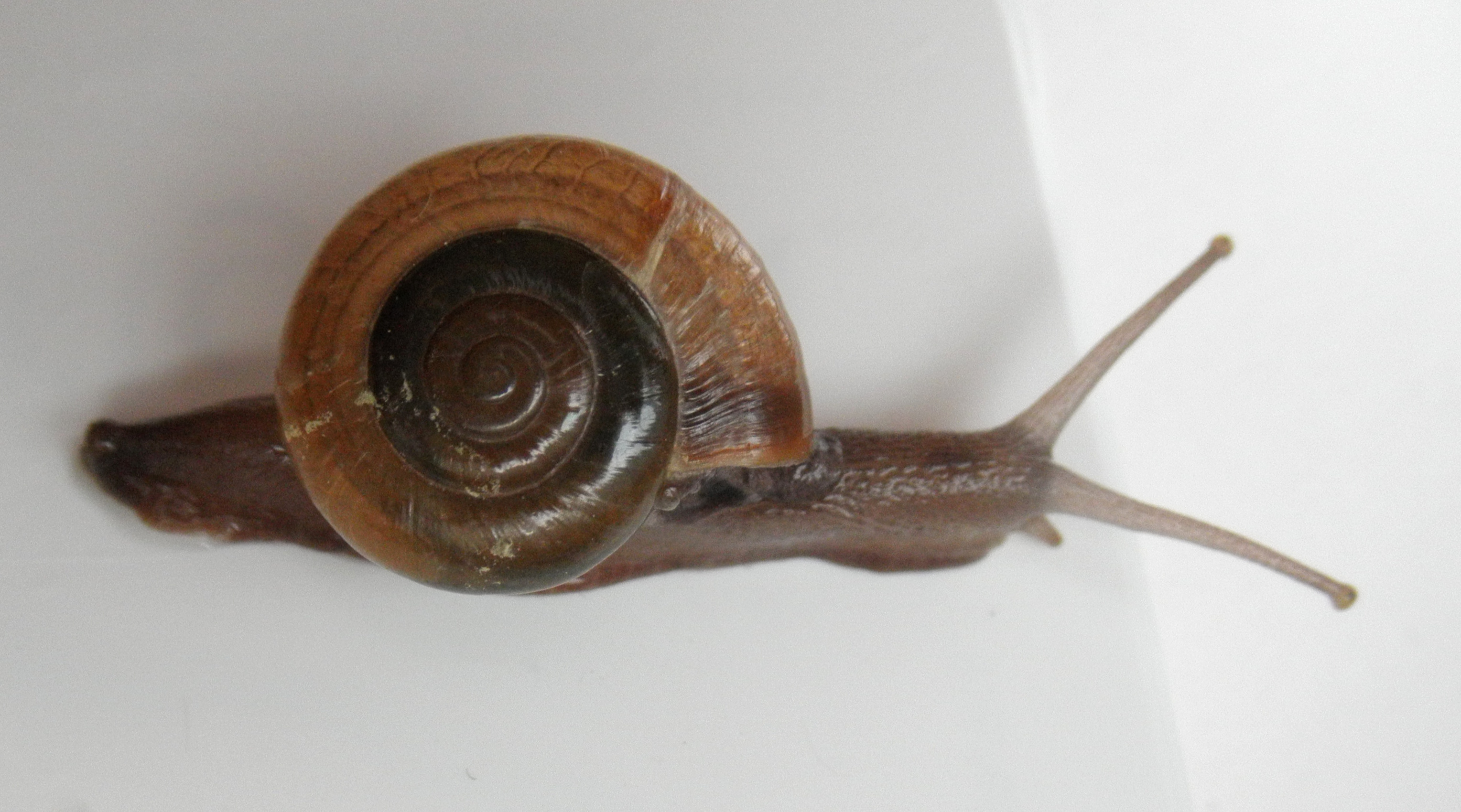
Dorsal view.
