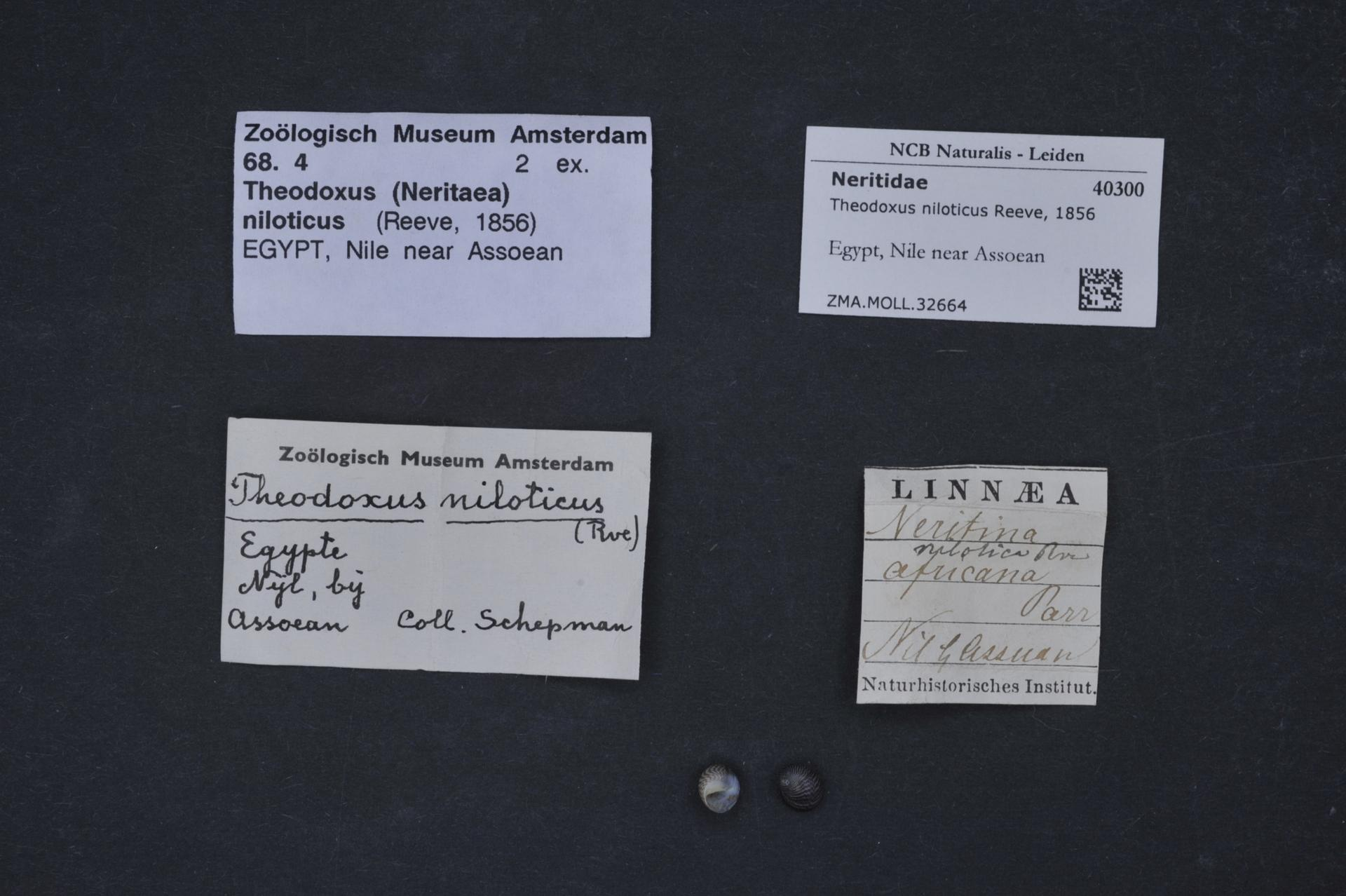
- Theodoxus niloticus shells

Conservation status
- Least Concern (IUCN 3.1)

Scientific classification
- Kingdom: Animalia
- Phylum: Mollusca
- Class: Gastropoda
- Order: Cycloneritida
- Family: Neritidae
- Genus: Theodoxus
- Subgenus: Neritaea
- Species: T. niloticus

Binomial name
- Theodoxus niloticus (Reeve, 1856)

Synonyms
- Theodoxia africana Bourguignat, 1883; Theodoxus africanus (Reeve, 1856)

= Theodoxus niloticus =

Species of gastropod

Theodoxus niloticus is a species of freshwater snail with a gill and an operculum. It is an aquatic gastropod mollusk in the family Neritidae, the nerites.

== Distribution ==
Distribution of this species include Egypt and Sudan.

The type locality is the Nile in Egypt.

== Description ==
The length of the shell is 8 mm (0.31 in).

There are two apophyses on its operculum.

== Ecology ==
It lives in slow running waters.
