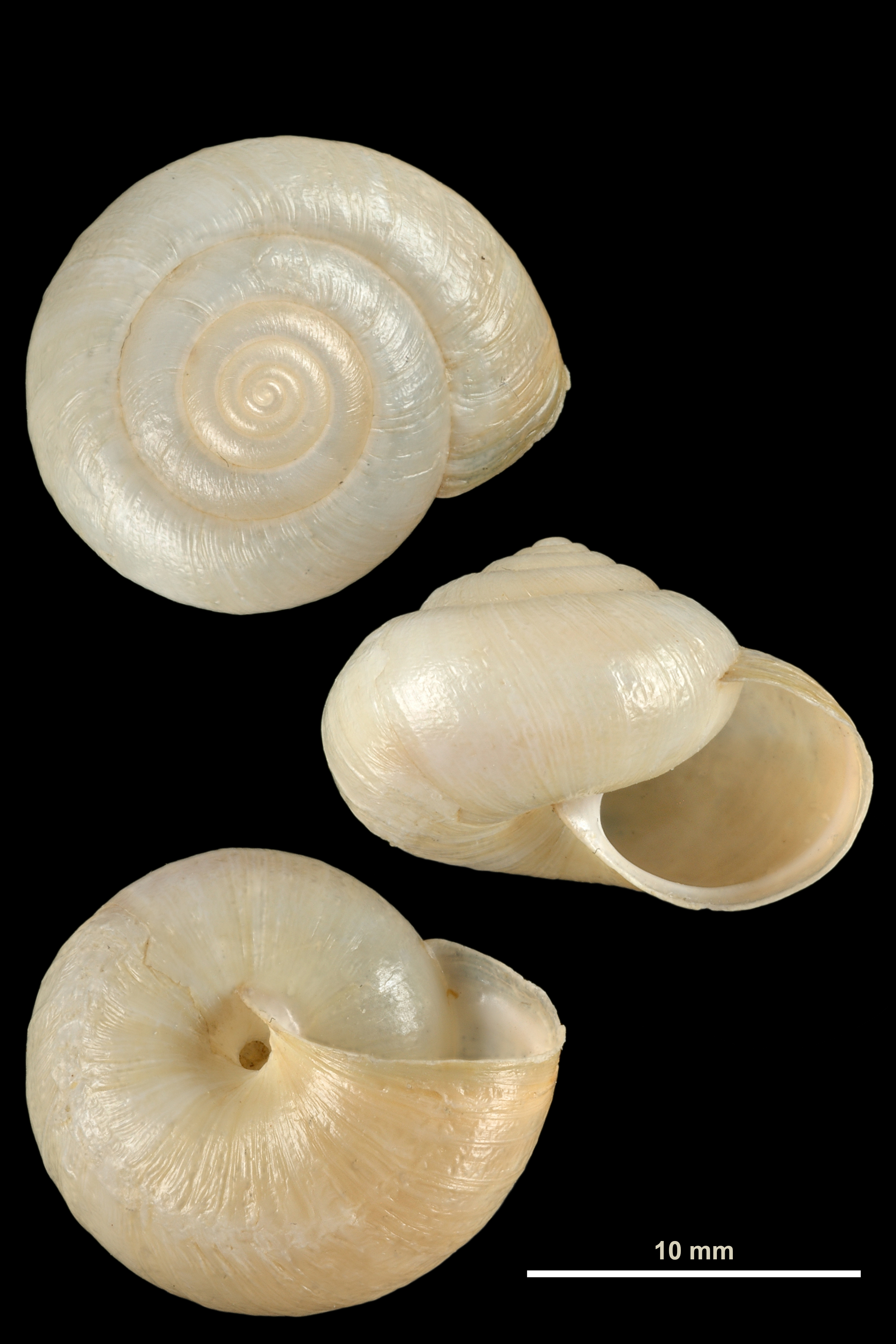
- Shell of Monacha cantiana (specimen at MNHN, Paris)

Conservation status
- Secure (NatureServe)

Scientific classification
- Kingdom: Animalia
- Phylum: Mollusca
- Class: Gastropoda
- Order: Stylommatophora
- Family: Hygromiidae
- Genus: Monacha
- Species: M. cantiana

Binomial name
- Monacha cantiana (Montagu, 1803)

= Monacha cantiana =

Species of gastropod

Monacha cantiana, common name the Kentish snail or Kentish garden snail, is a species of medium-sized air-breathing land snail, a terrestrial pulmonate gastropod mollusk in the family Hygromiidae, the hairy snails and their allies.

== Distribution ==
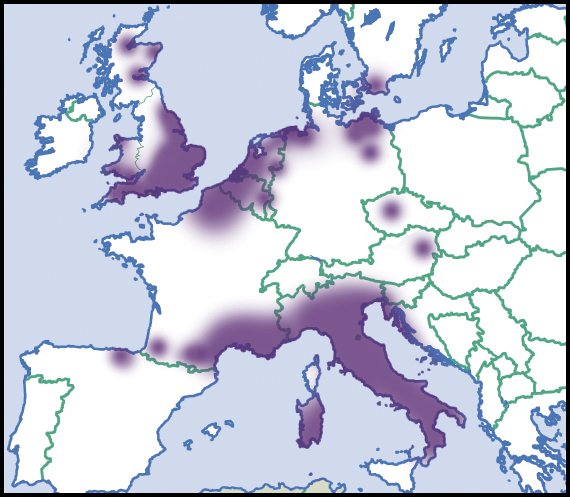
Distribution of Monacha cantiana in Europe

This species is known to occur in European countries and islands including:

- Great Britain, England
- France
- Italy
- Belgium
- Netherlands
- Germany
- Czech Republic - non-indigenous in Bohemia since 2009

Africa:

- Egypt

== Life cycle ==
The size of the egg is 1.8 mm.
