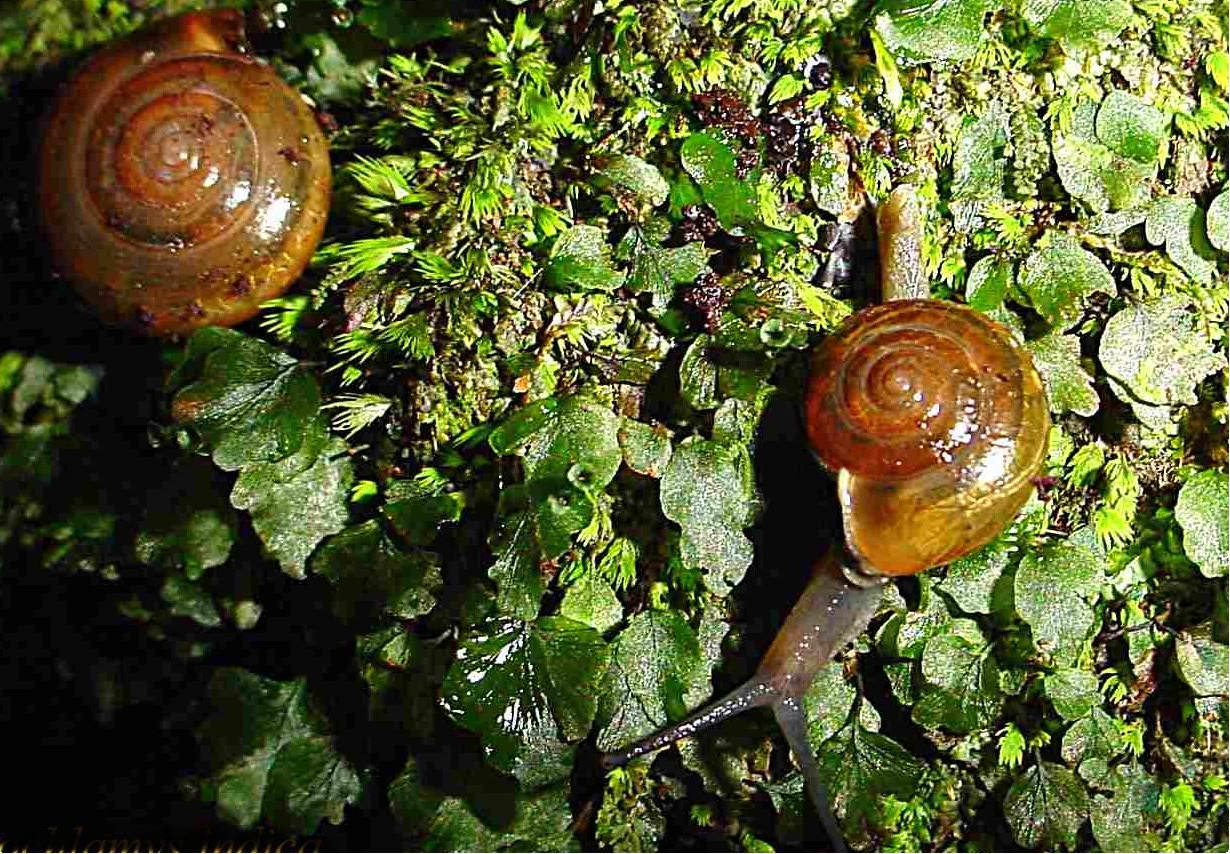

Scientific classification
- Kingdom: Animalia
- Phylum: Mollusca
- Class: Gastropoda
- Order: Stylommatophora
- Family: Ariophantidae
- Genus: Tanychlamys
- Species: T. indica

Binomial name
- Tanychlamys indica (Godwin-Austen, 1883)

Synonyms
- Helix vitrinoides sensu Benson, 1836; Macrochlamys indica Benson, 1832; Nanina (Macrochlamys) pseudovitrinoides G. Nevill, 1881

= Tanychlamys indica =

Species of gastropod

Tanychlamys indica, also known as the horntail snail is a species of air-breathing land snail, a terrestrial pulmonate gastropod mollusk, in the family Ariophantidae.

== Distribution ==
=== Native Range ===
This species occurs in countries including:

- India, Lower Bengal, common at Kolkata.

=== Introduced Range ===
- Egypt
- Brazil
- Japan

In 2017, the snail was confirmed in the Brazilian states of Santa Catarina and Paraná. The introduction was likely due to international trade of citrus fruit seedlings. Citizen-science via iNaturalist indicates that the snail has likely been present since well before 2017. As of 2024, the snail is present in 16 Brazilian states, including the Amazon.

Records of the snail have appear in Nicaragua as well as in the Bahamas. In the USA, in August 2020, a single horntail was found in Miami-Dade County, Florida. One sighting has occurred in the state of Texas as well.

This species has not yet become established in the USA, but it is considered to represent a potentially serious threat as a pest, an invasive species which could negatively affect agriculture, natural ecosystems, human health or commerce. Therefore, it has been suggested that this species be given top national quarantine significance in the USA.

Tanychlamys was identified in Okinawa, Japan, in the early 2000s. Subsequently, the snail was reported in Mie, Aichi, and Gifu prefectures, as well as the Ogasawara Islands, a UNESCO World Heritage site. However, the species wasn't identified as Tanychlamys indica until 2022, using molecular phylogenetic methods. The snail was most closely related to Tanychlamys indica from Rajshahi, Bangladesh and West Bengal, India.

== Shell description ==
The shell is perforate, depressed, smooth, polished throughout, translucent, pale brownish tawny, not distinctly striated, but with microscopic longitudinal impressed lines, slightly flexuous and not close together. The spire is low, conoid. The suture is slightly impressed. The shell has 5.5 whorls, that are slightly convex above. The last whorl is not descending. The last whorl is rounded at the periphery and moderately convex beneath.

The aperture is slightly oblique and broadly lunate. The peristome is thin in one plane, with columellar margin is curved, oblique, never quite vertical, carried forward and briefly reflected above.

The width of the shell is 16–18.5 mm. The height of the shell is 8.5 mm.

== Anatomy ==
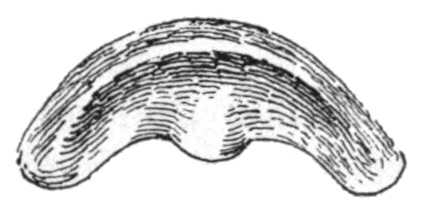
Drawing of the jaw.

The most distinguishable features are the caudal horn at the base of the foot and a flap of flesh, called a dorsal lobe, that extends out of the shell, wrapping against its side.

The animal is purplish grey not black, elongate. The right shell-lobe is small, the left is narrowly reflected over the edge of the peristome, and at the basal side gives off a short tongue-like process. The right dorsal lobe is narrow and elongate, the left in two distinct portions.

In the genitalia is a moderately long cylindrical blunt kalc-sac is given off at the junction of the vas deferens, and the caecum of the penis, to which the retractor muscle is attached, is sharply coiled. The dart-sac is long, the spermatheca short and elongately pear-shaped.

The radula contains about 88 rows of teeth, with the arrangement: 34.2.9.1.9.2.34 (45.1.45).

== Feeding and Behavior ==
Within its native range, the snail is sometimes considered a minor pest. It feeds on seedlings and fallen, decomposed leaves but can also feed on the moss of garden walls. However, it will also feed on various plants commonly found in gardens and fruit crops such as papaya. Ornamental plants are also at risk, such as common commercial flower types.

Eggs are laid in moist soil, but in some cases are laid in crevices as high as 130 cm. The parent snail will dig in the soil with their snout and foot, laying eggs about 2 cm deep. Laying takes between 10-24 minutes and the snail may or may not cover the nest before leaving.

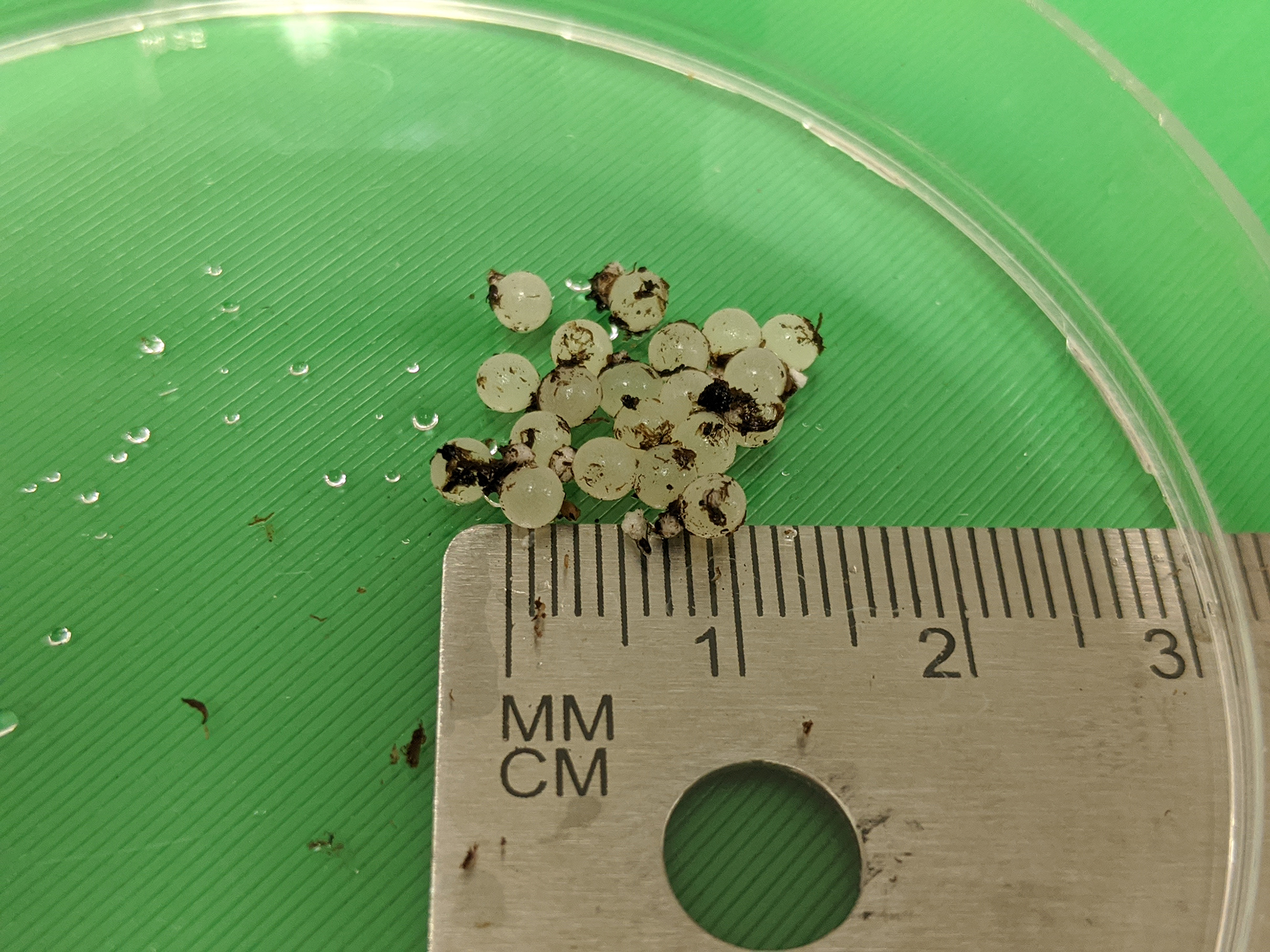
Tanychlamys indica eggs

Egg clutches, or broods, vary widely and increase with the age and size of snail. The eggs are round, translucent, and covered by a calcium shell. The eggs will hatch after 8-12 days, when the shell becomes transparent. Unlike other terrestrial snails, the hatchlings, or neonates, do not consume their eggshell upon hatching. In fact, they were observed to not eat until they were 4 days old.

The horntail snail will gain sexual maturity at 130 days old, with first oviposition to begin in the second year. The snail is a protandrous hermaphrodite, where the male sex organs reach maturity first, followed by the female sex organs. Key factors for mating are temperature, humidity, and rainfall; with mating usually aligning with the monsoon seasons of south and south-east Asia.

When two snails mate, courtship begins with protruding organs, caressing, mutual biting, and profuse slimy secretion. A 'love dart', an auxiliary copulatory organ, is also stabbed into the mating partner during courtship. It can be observed as a white, smooth, elongate, S-shaped tube, and is useful in distinguishing between species. The 'love dart' can be retracted by its owner, or may be stuck in the mate's body, and will be regrown by the next mating session.

Usually mating is reciprocal, but in 14% of cases it may be one-sided. Snails will lay between 4-6 clutches within the mating season, usually at 12-day intervals but this may be prolonged if conditions are unsuitable. Clutches have a 50-100% hatch rate, with about 200 eggs produced within their 4-year lifespan. However, in ideal conditions, such as a temperature-controlled nursery, egg-laying can be continuous.
