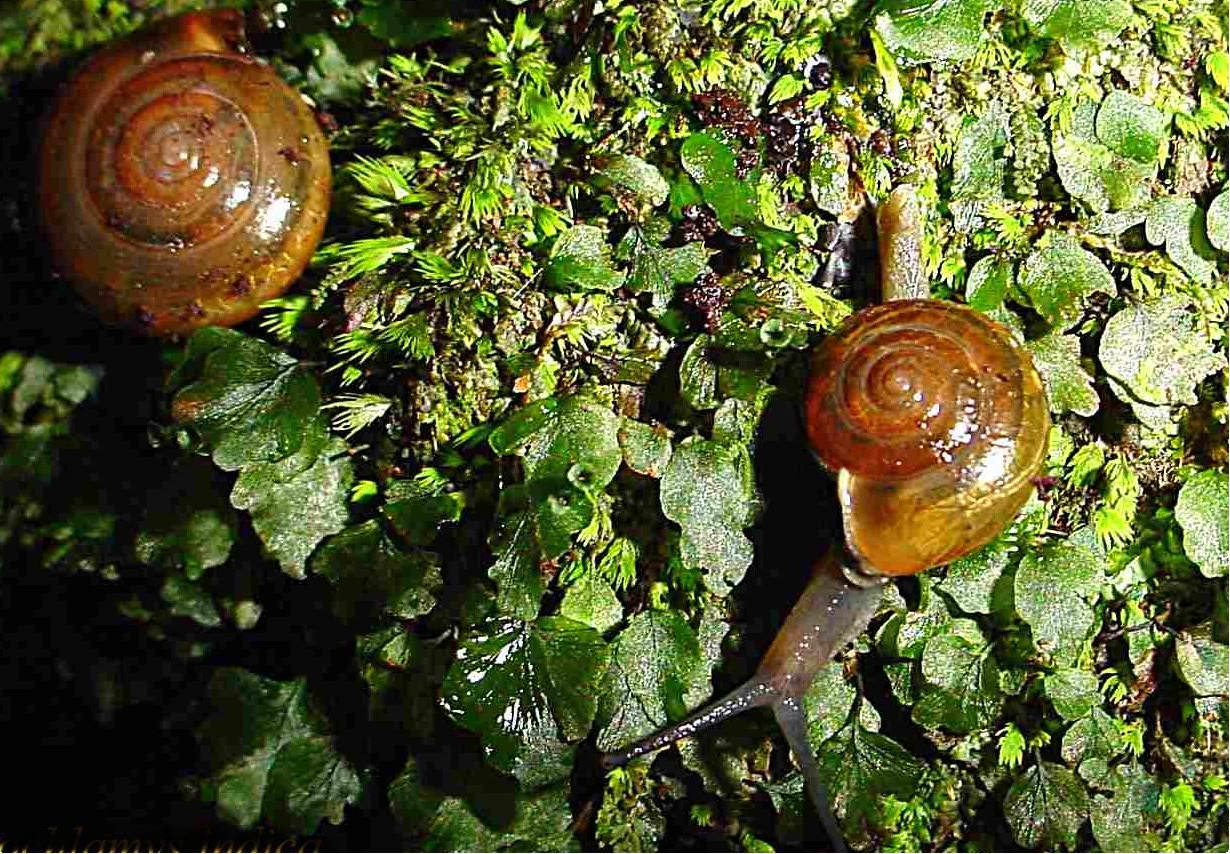
- A live individual and an empty shell of Tanychlamys indica

Scientific classification
- Kingdom: Animalia
- Phylum: Mollusca
- Class: Gastropoda
- Order: Stylommatophora
- Superfamily: Helicarionoidea
- Family: Ariophantidae
- Subfamily: Macrochlamydinae
- Genus: Tanychlamys; Benson, 1834

Type species
- Helix vitrinoides Deshayes, 1831

Synonyms
- List: Ariophanta (Macrochlamys) Gray, 1847; Helicarion (Macrochlamys) W. H. Benson, 1836; Macrochlamys W. H. Benson, 1836; Macrochlamys (Euaustenia) Cockerell, 1891; Macrochlamys (Macrochlamys) Gray, 1847; Macrochlamys (Rhadella) Godwin-Austen, 1914; Nanina (Macrochlamys) W. H. Benson, 1836; Nanina (Orobia) E. von Martens, 1860; Orobia E. von Martens, 1860; Stenopus (Macrochlamys) W. H. Benson, 1836

= Tanychlamys =

Genus of gastropods

Tanychlamys is a large genus of air-breathing land snails, terrestrial pulmonate gastropod mollusks in the family Ariophantidae.

== Species ==
Species within the genus Tanychlamys include:

- Tanychlamys amboinensis (von Martens, 1864)
- Tanychlamys ceromatica (Morelet, 1881)
- Tanychlamys clessini Westerlund, 1902
- Tanychlamys indica Benson, 1832
- Tanychlamys kasnakowi (Westerlund, 1898)
- Tanychlamys tersa (Issel, 1874)
- Tanychlamys turanica Martens, 1874
- Tanychlamys vitrinoides (Deshayes, 1831)

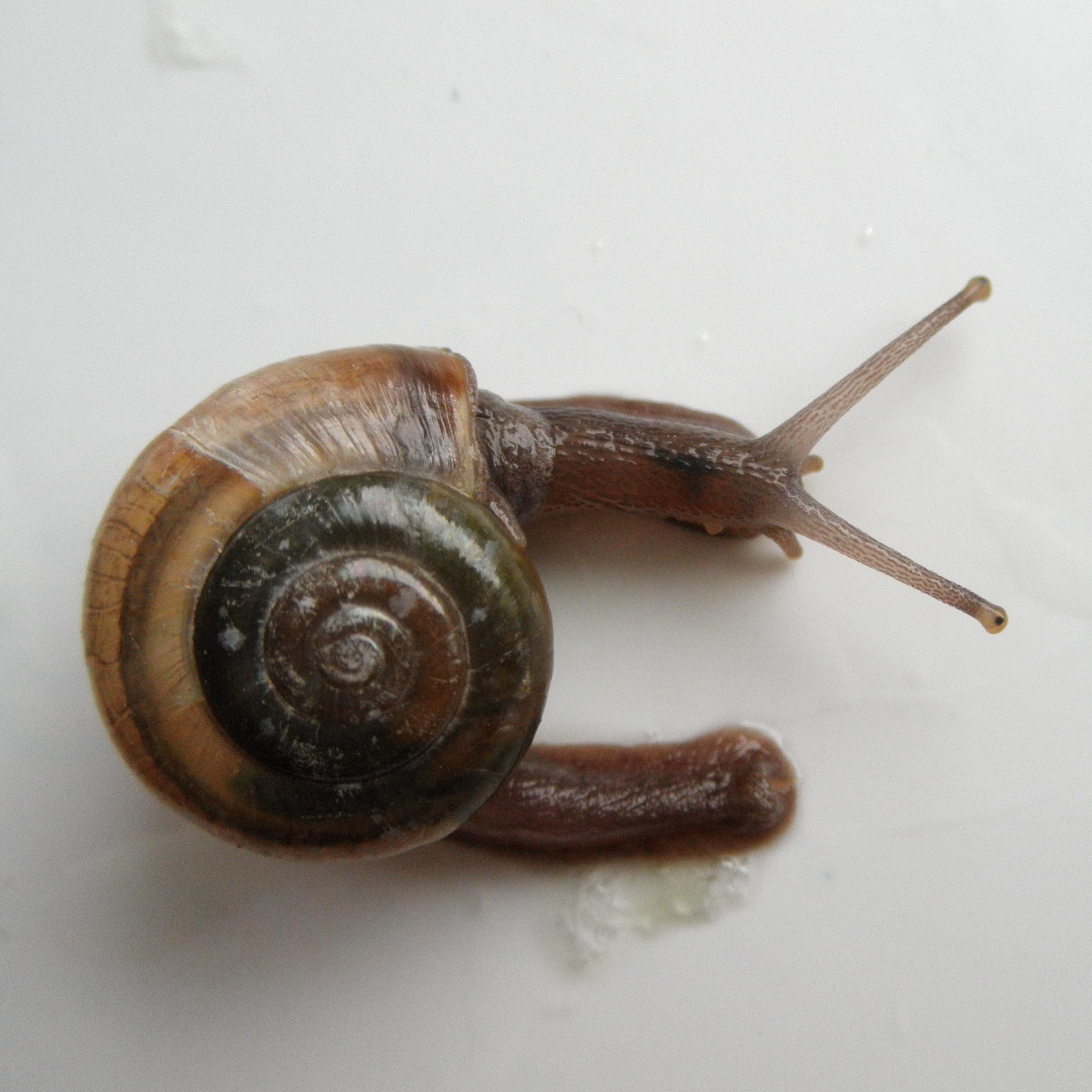
Macrochlamys amboinensis
