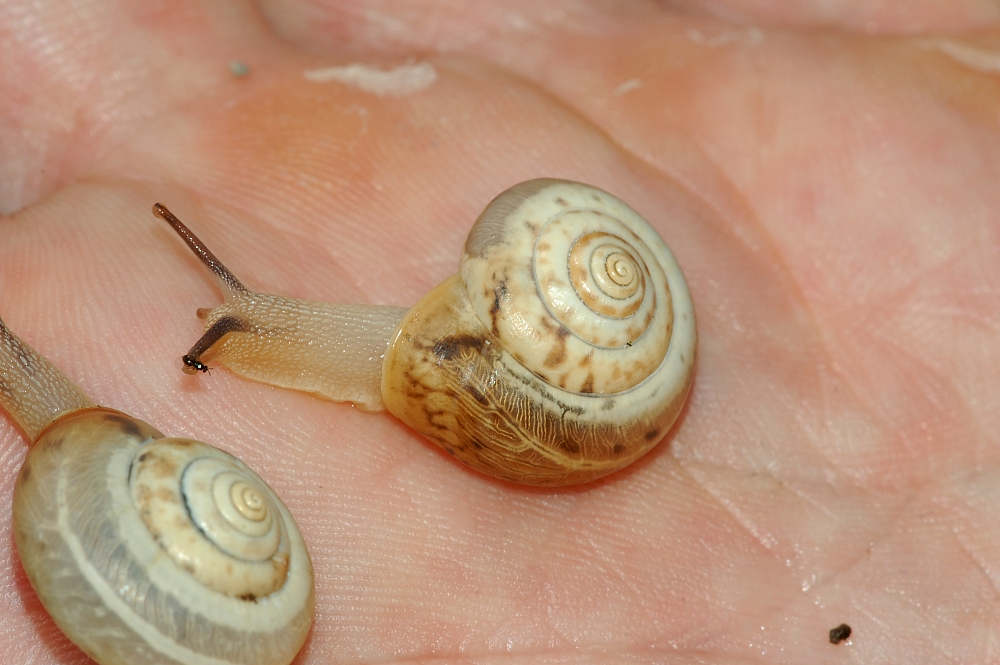
- Two live individuals of Monacha cartusiana on a human hand

Conservation status
- Least Concern (IUCN 3.1)

- Secure (NatureServe)

Scientific classification
- Kingdom: Animalia
- Phylum: Mollusca
- Class: Gastropoda
- Order: Stylommatophora
- Family: Hygromiidae
- Genus: Monacha
- Species: M. cartusiana

Binomial name
- Monacha cartusiana (O. F. Müller, 1774)

Synonyms
- Helix (Fruticicola) cartusiana O. F. Müller, 1774 (unaccepted combination); Helix (Zenobia) bimarginata Gray, 1821 (junior synonym); Helix cartusiana Müller, 1774; Helix cartusiana var. depressa Caziot, 1909 (invalid; preoccupied); Monacha (Monacha) cartusiana (O. F. Müller, 1774)· accepted, alternate representation

= Monacha cartusiana =

Species of gastropod

Monacha cartusiana is a species of small air-breathing land snail, a terrestrial eupulmonate gastropod mollusc in the family Hygromiidae, the hairy snails and their allies.

This is the type species of the genus Monacha.

== Distribution ==
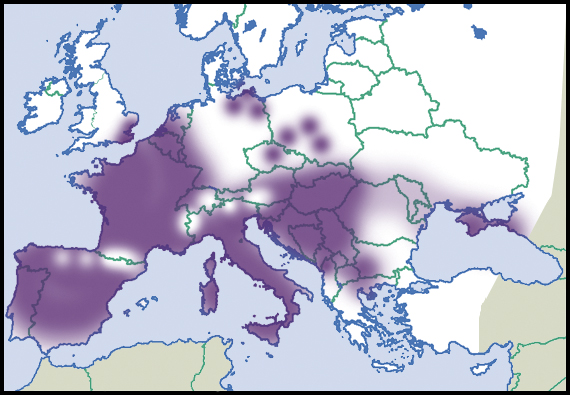
European distribution

The native distribution of this species is Atlantic-Mediterranean. It lives in various areas including:

- Great Britain. This species was fully protected in the United Kingdom under the Wildlife and Countryside Act 1981 from 1981 to 1988.
- Ukraine

This species has been accidentally introduced and naturalized in:

- United States - Newcastle County, Delaware

== Life cycle ==
The size of the egg is 1.8 mm.
