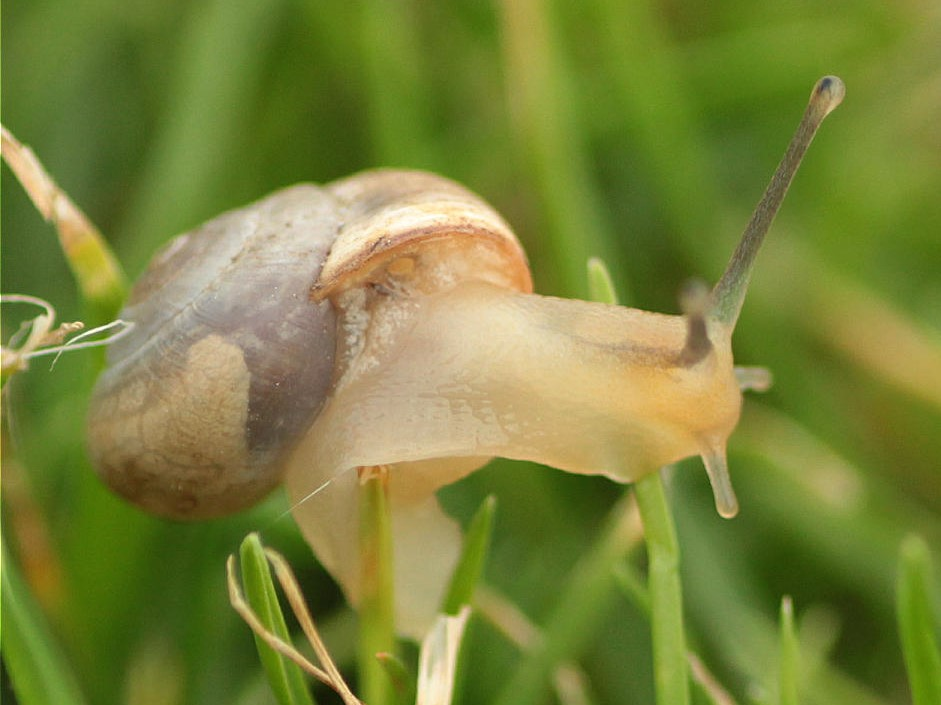

Scientific classification
- Kingdom: Animalia
- Phylum: Mollusca
- Class: Gastropoda
- Order: Stylommatophora
- Family: Hygromiidae
- Genus: Monacha
- Species: M. obstructa

Binomial name
- Monacha obstructa (Pfeiffer, 1842)

Synonyms
- Helix obstructa Pfeiffer, 1842

= Monacha obstructa =

Species of gastropod

Monacha obstructa is a species of air-breathing land snail, a terrestrial pulmonate gastropod mollusk in the family Hygromiidae, the hairy snails and their allies.

== Distribution ==
This species occurs in Egypt and Israel. M. obstructa is also invasive in Saudi Arabia and Qatar.

== Parasites ==
Parasites of Monacha obstructa include:

- Brachylaima sp. in the kidney of infected snails
