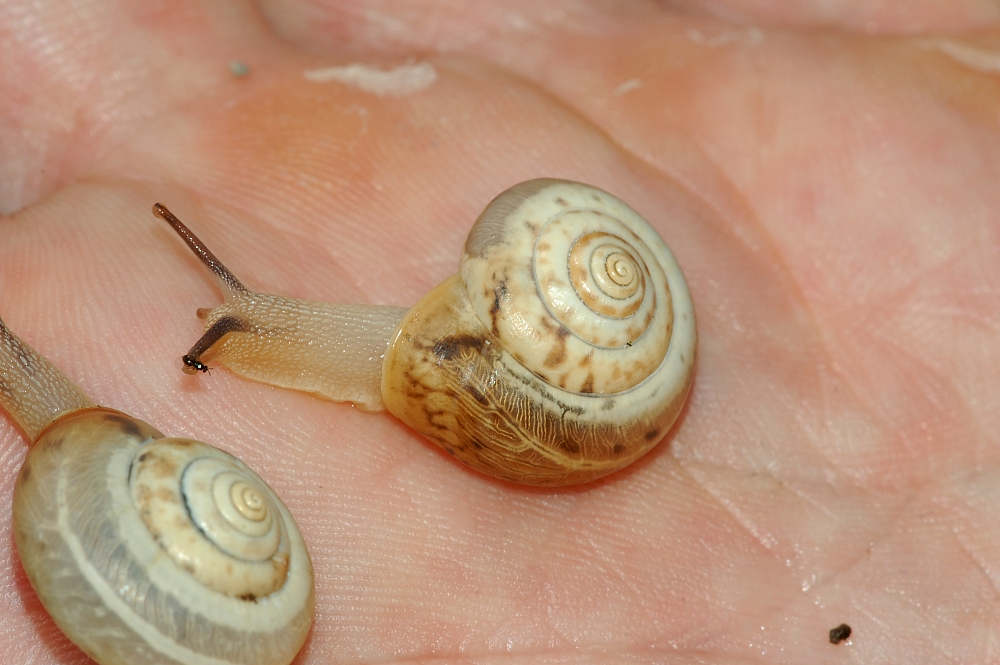
- Two live individuals of Monacha cartusiana on a human hand

Scientific classification
- Domain: Eukaryota
- Kingdom: Animalia
- Phylum: Mollusca
- Class: Gastropoda
- Order: Stylommatophora
- Infraorder: Helicoidei
- Superfamily: Helicoidea
- Family: Hygromiidae
- Genus: Monacha; Fitzinger, 1833

Type species
- Helix cartusiana O. F. Müller, 1774

Synonyms
- Boemica Schileyko, 1978; Carthusiana Kobelt, 1871; Carthusianana Fagot, 1893; Cemeneleana Caziot, 1908; Eutheba H. Nordsieck, 1993; Helix (Carthusiana) Kobelt, 1871; Helix (Monacha) Fitzinger, 1833; Helix (Zenobia) Gray, 1821 (subjective senior synonym of Monacha Fitzinger, 1833); Monacha (Aegaeotheba) Neiber & Hausdorf, 2017· accepted, alternate representation; Monacha (Eutheba) H. Nordsieck, 1993 (original rank); Monacha (Metatheba) P. Hesse, 1914· accepted, alternate representation; Monacha (Monacha) Fitzinger, 1833· accepted, alternate representation; Monacha (Paratheba) P. Hesse, 1914· accepted, alternate representation; Monacha (Pontotheba) Neiber & Hausdorf, 2017· accepted, alternate representation; Monacha (Rhytidotheba) Neiber & Hausdorf, 2017· accepted, alternate representation; Monacha (Szentgalya) L. Pintér, 1977; Monacha (Trichotheba) Neiber & Hausdorf, 2017· accepted, alternate representation; Olivieriana Bourguignat, 1860; Orsiniana Caziot, 1910; Paratheba P. Hesse, 1914 (unaccepted rank); Rhytidotheba Neiber & Hausdorf, 2017 (unaccepted rank); Zenobia Gray, 1821 (subjective senior synonym of Monacha Fitzinger, 1833; considered a nomen oblitum)

= Monacha =

Genus of gastropods

Monacha is a genus of air-breathing land snails, terrestrial pulmonate gastropod mollusks in the subfamily Trochulininae Lindholm, 1927 of the family Hygromiidae, the hairy snails and their allies.

== Distribution ==
The distribution of the genus Monacha includes western Europe, Central Europe, Mediterranean, Asia minor and Turkey (more than 50 species of Monacha), Georgia, Russia, Arabia, Iran, Azerbaijan (1 species). It is not in Armenia.

The greatest diversity of species is in the Pontic region.

== Species ==
Species within the genus Monacha include:

- Monacha albocincta (P. Hesse, 1912)
- Monacha aniliensis P. L. Reischütz & Sattmann, 1990
- Monacha ascania (Hausdorf, 2000)
- Monacha atacis E. Gittenberger & de Winter, 1985
- Monacha auturica Falkner, 2000
- Monacha badia (Hausdorf, 2000)
- Monacha bithynica (Hausdorf, 2000)
- Monacha cantiana (Montagu, 1803)
- Monacha carascaloides (Bourguignat, 1855)
- Monacha carinata (Hausdorf, 2000)
- Monacha cartusiana (Müller, 1774) - type species
- Monacha cemenelea (Risso, 1826)
- Monacha ciscaucasica (Hausdorf, 2000)
- Monacha claussi (Hausdorf, 2000)
- Monacha claustralis (Menke, 1828)
- Monacha comata (Hausdorf, 2000)
- Monacha compingtae (Pallary, 1929)
- Monacha consona (Rossmässler, 1839)
- Monacha crenophila (L. Pfeiffer, 1857)
- Monacha cretica Hausdorf, 2003
- Monacha crispulata (Mousson, 1861)
- Monacha densecostulata (Retowski, 1886)
- Monacha depressior (Hausdorf, 2000)
- Monacha devrekensis (Hausdorf, 2000)
- Monacha dirphica (E. von Martens, 1876)
- Monacha dofleini (P. Hesse, 1928)
- Monacha elatior (Hausdorf, 2000)
- Monacha eliae (Nägele, 1906)
- Monacha emigrata (Westerlund, 1894)
- Monacha euboeica (Kobelt, 1877)
- Monacha frequens (Mousson, 1859)
- Monacha fruticola (Krynicki, 1833)
- Monacha galatica (Hausdorf, 2000)
- Monacha gemina (Hausdorf, 2000)
- Monacha georgievi (Pall-Gergely, 2010)
- Monacha glareosa (Hausdorf, 2000)
- Monacha gregaria (Rossmässler, 1839)
- Monacha hamsikoeyensis (Hudec, 1973)
- Monacha haussknechti (O. Boettger, 1886)
- Monacha hemitricha (P. Hesse, 1914)
- Monacha heteromorpha (Hausdorf, 2000)
- Monacha ignorata (O. Boettger, 1905)
- Monacha kuznetsovi (Hausdorf, 2000)
- Monacha lamalouensis (Reynès, 1870)
- Monacha laxa (Hudec, 1973)
- Monacha leucozona (Hausdorf, 2000)
- Monacha liebegottae (Hausdorf, 2000)
- Monacha maasseni Hausdorf, 2003
- Monacha magna (Hausdorf, 2000)
- Monacha margarita (Hausdorf, 2000)
- Monacha martensiana (Tiberi, 1869)
- Monacha melitensis (P. Hesse, 1915)
- Monacha menkhorsti (Hausdorf, 2000)
- Monacha merssinae (Mousson, 1874)
- Monacha microtricha S. H. F. Jaeckel, 1954
- Monacha nordsiecki (Hausdorf, 2000)
- Monacha obstructa (L. Pfeiffer, 1842)
- Monacha ocellata (Roth, 1839)
- Monacha oecali Hausdorf & Páll-Gergely, 2009
- Monacha orsini (Porro, 1841)
- Monacha oshanovae I. Pintér & L. Pintér, 1970
- Monacha ovularis (Bourguignat, 1855)
- Monacha pamphylica (Hausdorf, 2000)
- Monacha pantanellii (De Stefani, 1879)
- Monacha parumcincta (Menke, 1828)
- Monacha perfrequens (Hesse, 1914)
- Monacha pharmacia (Hausdorf, 2000)
- Monacha phazimonitica (Hausdorf, 2000)
- Monacha pseudorothii Hausdorf, 2003
- Monacha pusilla (Hausdorf, 2000)
- Monacha riedeli (Hausdorf, 2000)
- Monacha rizzae (Aradas, 1844)
- Monacha roseni (Hesse, 1914)
- Monacha rothii (L. Pfeiffer, 1841)
- Monacha samsunensis (L. Pfeiffer, 1868)
- Monacha saninensis (Pallary, 1939)
- Monacha sedissana (Hausdorf, 2000)
- Monacha solidior (Mousson, 1863)
- Monacha spiroxia spiroxia (Bourguignat, 1868)
- Monacha spiroxia atik (Schutt, 2001)
- Monacha stipulifera (Hausdorf, 2000)
- Monacha subaii (Hausdorf, 2000)
- Monacha subcarthusiana (Lindholm, 1913)
- Monacha syriaca (Ehrenberg, 1831)
- Monacha terebrata (Hausdorf, 2000)
- Monacha tibarenica Neiber & Hausdorf, 2017
- Monacha venusta (L. Pinter, 1968)

The species Ashfordiana granulata (Alder, 1830) is often also grouped under the genus Monacha.

Taxon inquirendum

- Monacha talischana (E. von Martens, 1880)

Synonyms

- Monacha beieri Klemm, 1962: synonym of Monacha haussknechti (O. Boettger, 1886) (junior synonym)
- Monacha fallax A. J. Wagner, 1914: synonym of Monachoides fallax (A. J. Wagner, 1914) (original combination)
- Monacha ruffoi Giusti, 1973: synonym of Monacha pantanellii (De Stefani, 1879) (junior synonym)
- Monacha tschegemica Schileyko, 1988: synonym of Paratheba roseni (Hesse, 1914): synonym of Monacha roseni (Hesse, 1914) (junior synonym)
