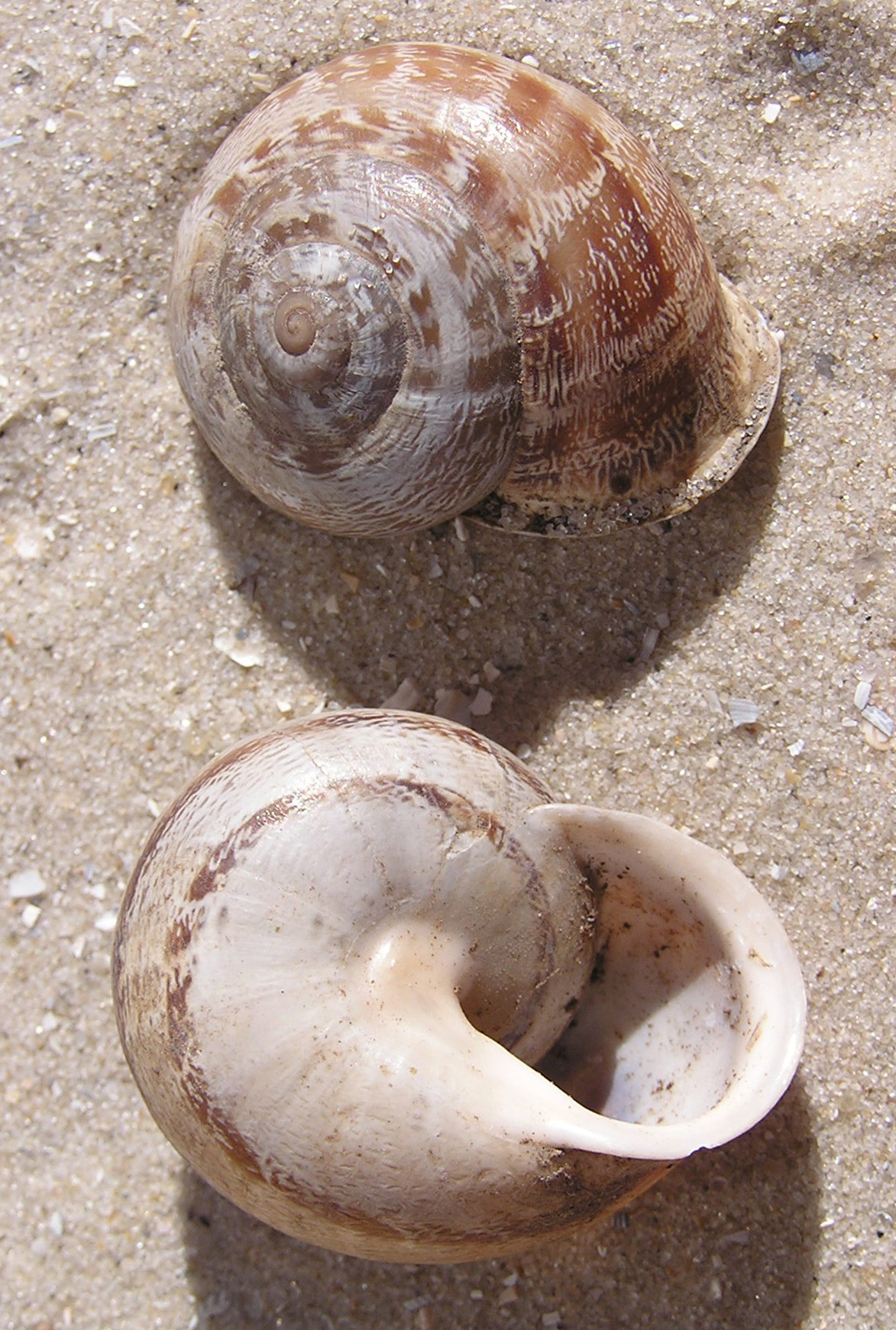
- Two shells of the species showing apical and apertural views
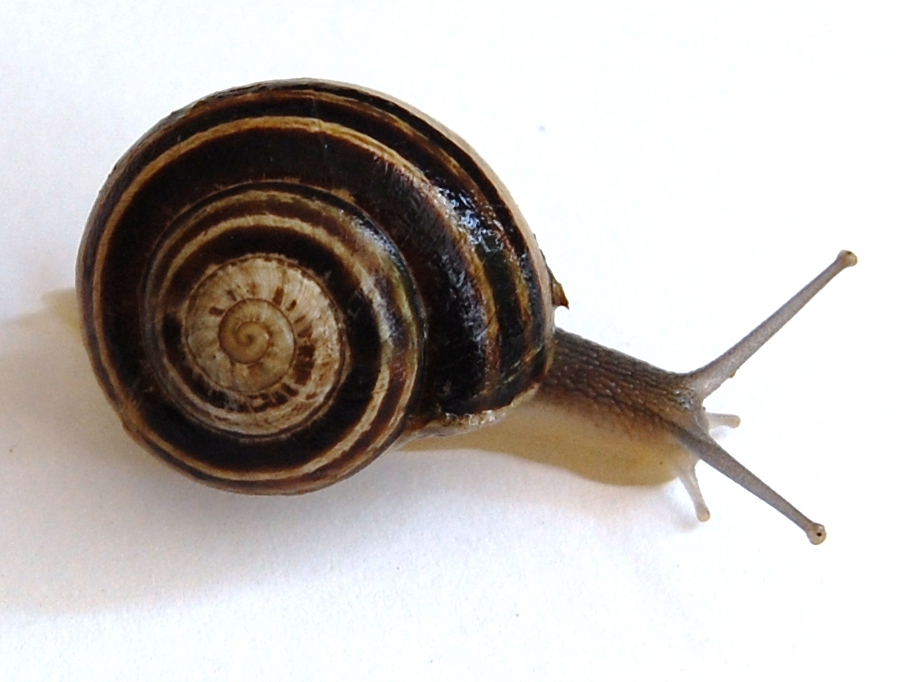
- An unusually dark, subadult live individual of Eobania vermiculata

Conservation status
- Secure (NatureServe)

Scientific classification
- Kingdom: Animalia
- Phylum: Mollusca
- Class: Gastropoda
- Order: Stylommatophora
- Family: Helicidae
- Genus: Eobania
- Species: E. vermiculata

Binomial name
- Eobania vermiculata (O. F. Müller, 1774)

Synonyms
- Helix vermiculata O. F. Müller, 1774

= Eobania vermiculata =

Species of gastropod

Eobania vermiculata also known as Helix vermiculata, common name the chocolate-band snail, is a species of large, air-breathing land snail, a terrestrial pulmonate gastropod mollusk in the family Helicidae, the true snails or typical snails.

Eobania vermiculata is the type species of the genus Eobania.

== Distribution ==
This species of large land snail is common in the Mediterranean area; its distribution ranges from eastern Spain to Crimea:

- Israel
- Egypt
- eastern Spain
- eastern Bulgaria
- southern Greece
- Crimea in Ukraine

The nonindigenous distribution of E. vermiculata includes:

- This species has been introduced to southeastern Australia, where it is known as the chocolate-band snail.
- One individual of this snail species was found living on a wall in Lewisham, London, England, in 2006. It remains to be seen if a colony will establish itself or not.
- Eobania vermiculata has non-indigenous populations in Belgium, Germany, Hungary, the Netherlands, the US, Australia, Japan, South Africa, Egypt, Israel, Saudi Arabia, Jordan, and Iran.

This species is already established in the US, and is considered to represent a potentially serious threat as a pest, an invasive species which could negatively affect agriculture, natural ecosystems, human health or commerce. Therefore, it has been suggested that this species be given top national quarantine significance in the USA.

Eobania vermiculata is able to survive winters in the North-West European temperate zone, including Belgium and the Netherlands.

== Description ==
In this species the color of the shell is variable. The background color can be whitish to greenish yellow, and the shell often has darker coloured bands or spots. The ventral side of the shell frequently has two brown bands and is whitish between the lowest band and the umbilicus. The shell has 4–4.5 whorls. The last whorl descends abruptly below the periphery of the shell. The apertural margin is white, and is reflected (turned back) in adult shells; in juveniles this is true only on the columellar side. The umbilicus is narrow and open in juveniles, only partly covered by the reflected columellar margin; in adult shells, however, the umbilicus is completely closed.

The width of the shell is 22–32 mm; the height of the shell is 14–24 mm.

In northern Greece, the variability within the populations of this species seems to be lower than in southern Greece (Gávdos Island: 24.5-33.5 m in diameter of adult shells, average 28–29 m, with no local variations in shell size).

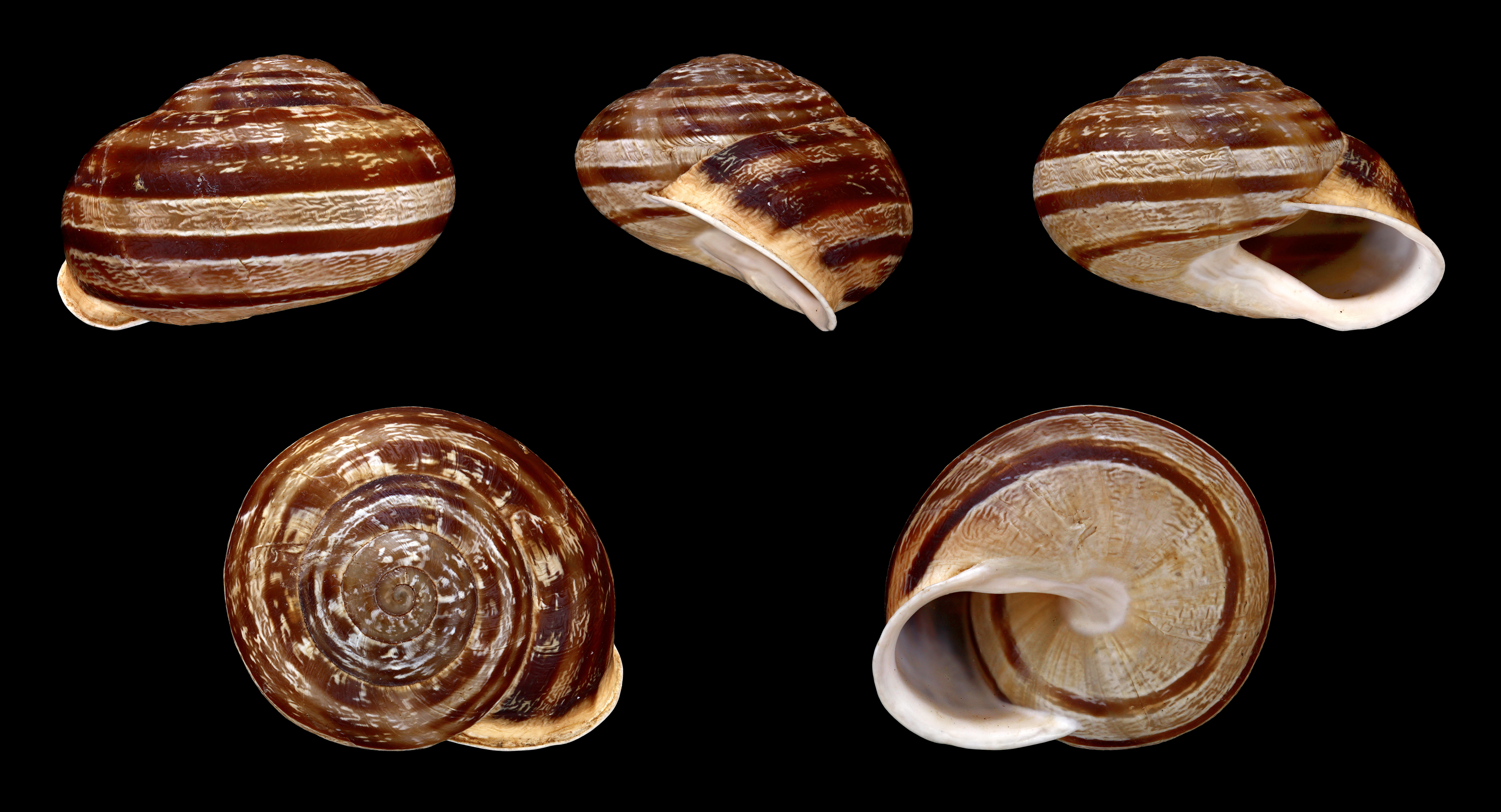
Five views of a shell of Eobania vermiculata

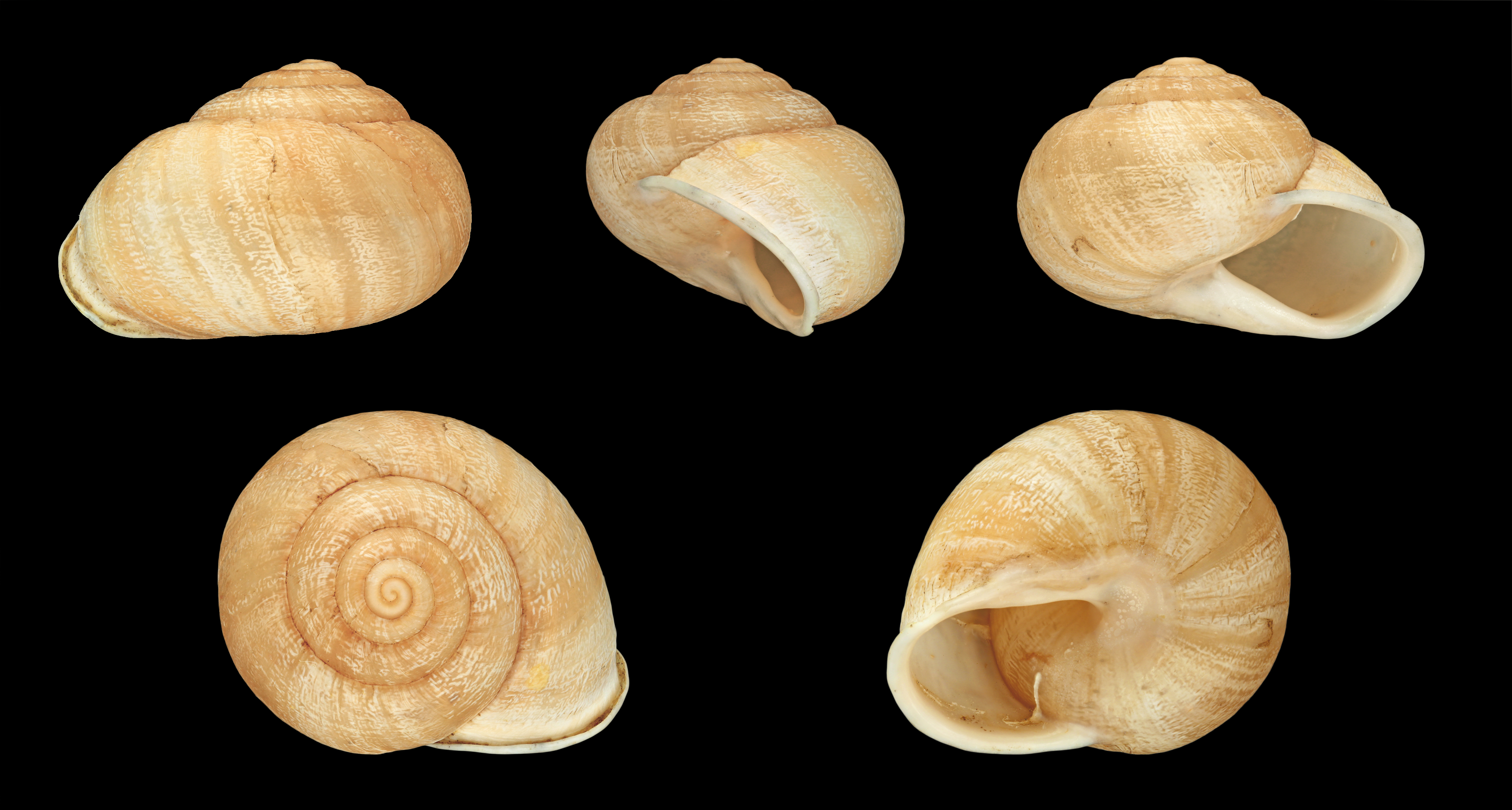
Five views of a cream-coloured shell of Eobania vermiculata

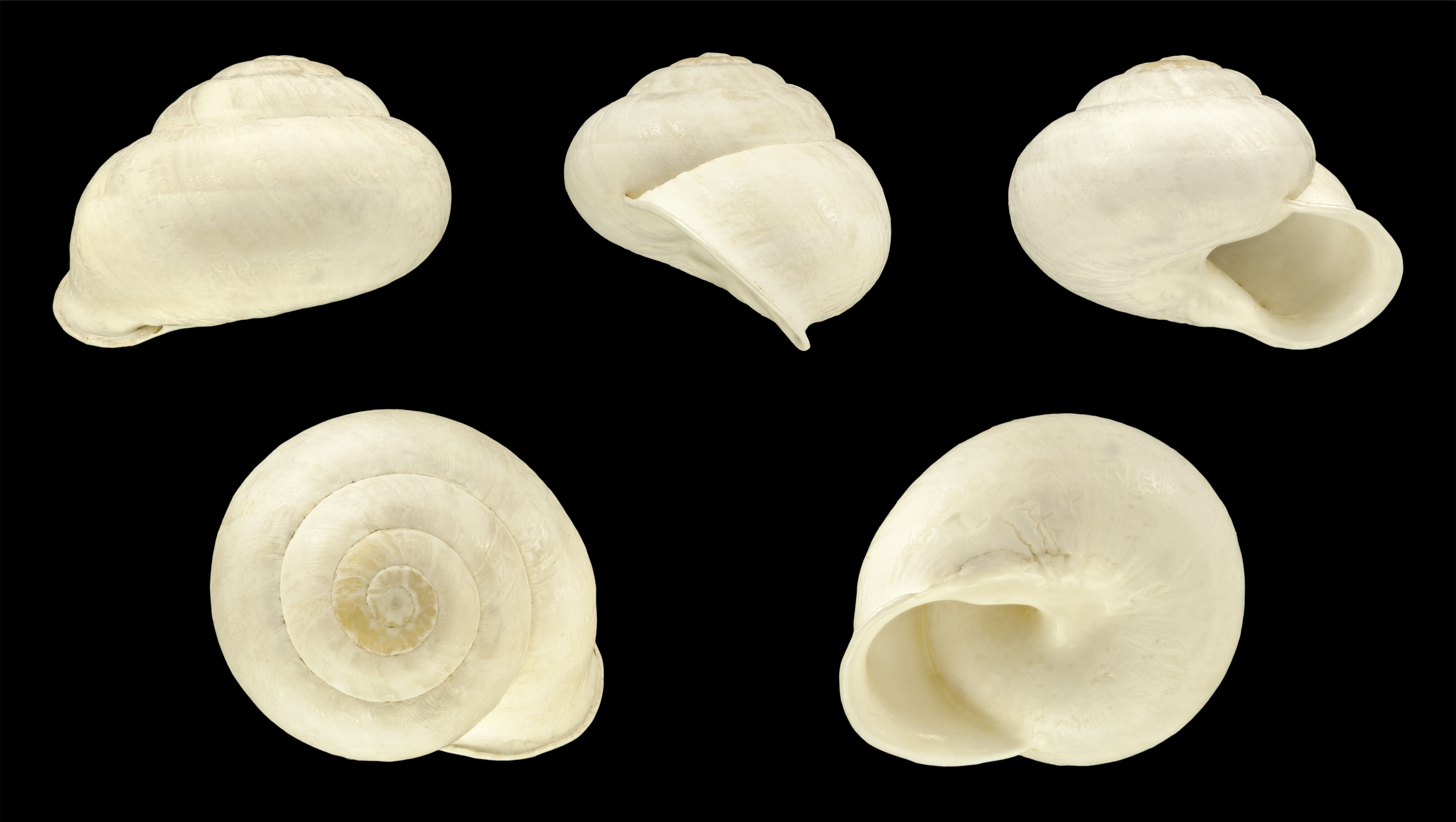
Five views of a white shell of Eobania vermiculata

Juveniles somewhat resemble the species Theba pisana (which also has a similar umbilicus); however E. vermiculata can be differentiated from that species by its much larger apex.

== Ecology ==
Eobania vermiculata live in a broad variety of habitats, usually in dry vegetation, mainly in the vicinity of the coast, and also in agricultural crops. It is very common in Crete and lives on practically every small island in the south Aegean.

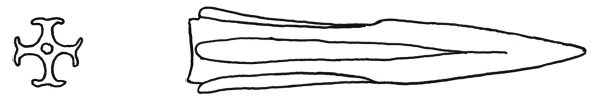
Drawing of love dart of Eobania vermiculata. Cross-section (on the left) and lateral view (on the right).

In northern Greece copulation takes place after the first rainfalls in autumn. These snails create and use love darts as part of their mating behavior. Around 70 eggs per snail are laid 20 days later. The size of the egg is 4.1 × 3 mm. Juveniles hatch shortly after and grow about 12–13 mm in diameter per year for 2 years (growth is usually restricted to February to June in northern Greece, in Crete this period ends already in May). Maturity is reached after 2 years when the diameter reaches 25 mm, the umbilicus becomes closed and the apertural margin becomes reflected. Snails reach 29–30 mm diameter in May/June of the second year in northern Greece (in April in Crete), reaching a maximum diameter (33 mm) may take 5 years or more, but mortality increases greatly after 2 years.

About 20% of the snails in a population survive to lay eggs in the 3rd year; 5% of the snails lay eggs again in the 4th year. The mortality rates decrease with age. The animals hibernate (in northern Greece) or aestivate (in Crete), but juveniles and adults show differences in their behaviour. Adults dig into the soil and build an epiphragm, while juveniles search protected places under stones or leaves of low plants.

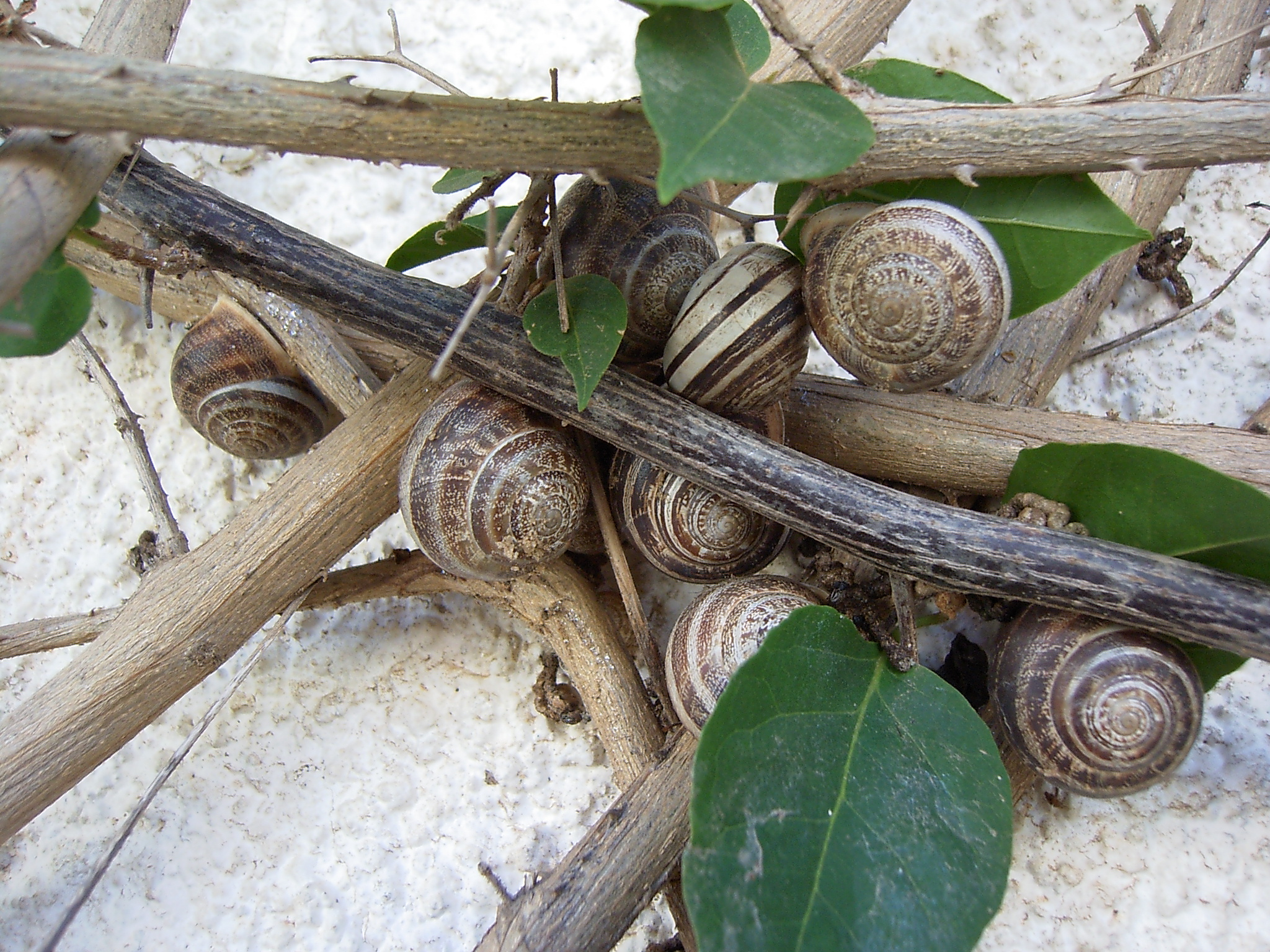
A group of Eobania vermiculata from Tunisia

== Human use ==
The species is used for food. It is commercialized and exported from Greece to France, which led Lazaridou-Dimitriadou & Kattoulas (1981) to propose restrictions on the size and seasons of collection for this species.
