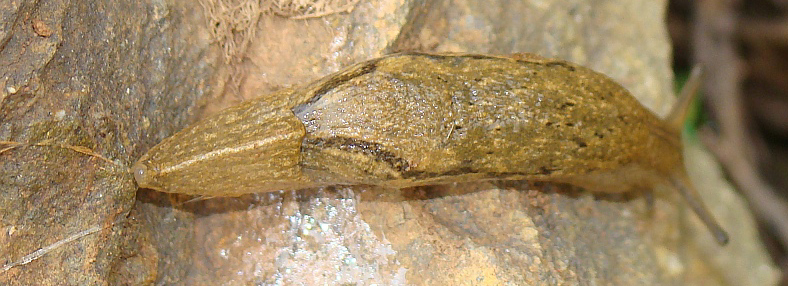
- Parmacella valenciennii
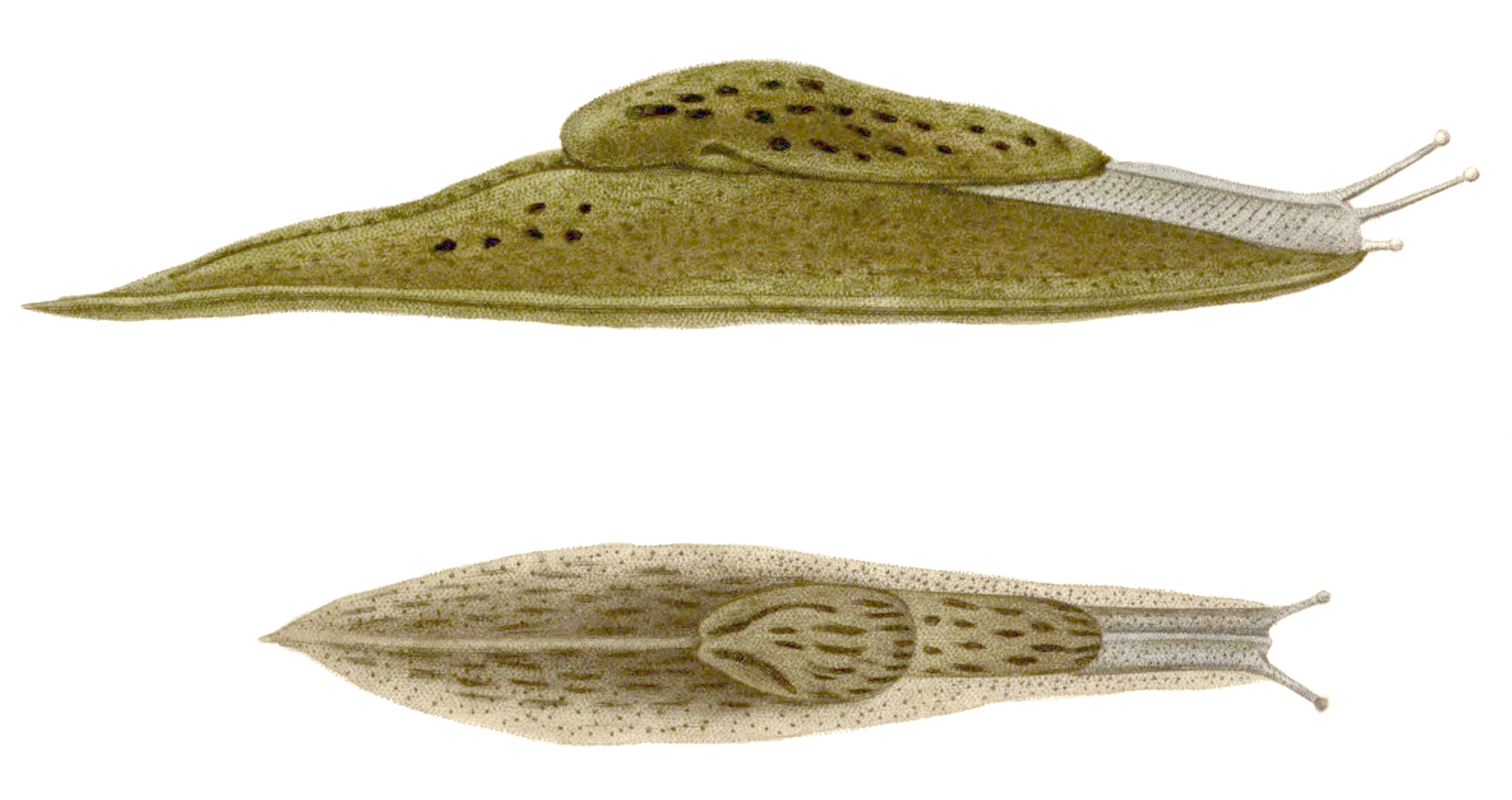
- Two views of a live individual of Cryptella canariensis

Scientific classification
- Kingdom: Animalia
- Phylum: Mollusca
- Class: Gastropoda
- Order: Stylommatophora
- Superfamily: Parmacelloidea
- Family: Parmacellidae; P. Fischer, 1856 (1855)

Genera
- See text

Synonyms
- Cryptellidae Gray, 1855 (nomen oblitum)

= Parmacellidae =

Parmacellidae Temporal range: ?Upper Eocene, Lower Pliocene-Recent

Family of gastropods

Parmacellidae is a family of air-breathing land slugs, terrestrial pulmonate gastropod mollusks within the superfamily Parmacelloidea (according to the taxonomy of the Gastropoda by Bouchet & Rocroi, 2005).

This family has no subfamilies (according to the taxonomy of the Gastropoda by Bouchet & Rocroi, 2005).

Slugs in this family make and use love darts made of chitin.

== Distribution ==
The distribution of the family Parmacellidae includes the western Palearctic, and ranges from the Canary Islands and Europe to Afghanistan.

== Genera ==
Genera within family Parmacellidae include:

- Candaharia Godwin-Austen, 1888
  - subgenus Levanderiella Schileyko, 2007
- Cryptella Webb & Berthelot, 1833
- Parmacella Cuvier, 1804 - type genus

== Cladogram ==
The following cladogram shows the phylogenic relationship of this family with the other families in the limacoid clade:

- limacoid clade
  - Staffordioidea
    Staffordiidae
  - - - Dyakioidea
        Dyakiidae
      - Gastrodontoidea
        - Pristilomatidae
        - - Chronidae
          - - Euconulidae
            - Trochomorphidae
          - - Gastrodontidae
            - Oxychilidae
    - - Parmacelloidea
        - Trigonochlamydidae
        - Parmacellidae
        - Milacidae
      - - - Zonitoidea
            Zonitidae
          - Helicarionoidea
            - Helicarionidae
            - - Ariophantidae
              - Urocyclidae
        - Limacoidea
          - Vitrinidae
          - - Boettgerillidae
            - - Limacidae
              - Agriolimacidae
