= List of non-marine molluscs of Italy =

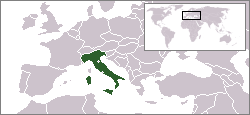
Location of Italy

The non-marine molluscs of Italy are a part of the molluscan fauna of Italy.

There are a number of species of non-marine molluscs living in the wild in Italy.

== Freshwater gastropods ==
Amnicolidae

- Marstoniopsis insubrica (Küster, 1853)

Bythinellidae

- Bythinella ligurica (Paladilhe, 1867)
- Bythinella opaca (M. von Gallenstein, 1848)
- Bythinella schmidtii (Küster, 1853)

Hydrobiidae

- Alzoniella bergomensis Pezzoli, 2010 - endemic to Italy
- Alzoniella borberensis Bodon & Cianfanelli, 2022 - endemic to Italy
- Alzoniella braccoensis Bodon & Cianfanelli, 2004 - endemic to Italy
- Alzoniella calorensis Cianfanelli & Bodon, 2017 - endemic to Italy
- Alzoniella cervarensis Cianfanelli, Talenti, Nardi & Bodon, 2019 - endemic to Italy
- Alzoniella cornucopia (De Stefani, 1880) - endemic to Italy
- Alzoniella delmastroi Bodon & Cianfanelli, 2004 - endemic to Italy
- Alzoniella fabrianensis (Pezzoli, 1969) - endemic to Italy
- Alzoniella feneriensis Giusti & Bodon, 1984 - endemic to Italy
- Alzoniella finalina Giusti & Bodon, 1984 - endemic to Italy
- Alzoniella isoensis Bodon & Cianfanelli, 2022 - endemic to Italy
- Alzoniella ligustica (Giusti & Bodon, 1981) - endemic to Italy
- Alzoniella lunensis Bodon & Cianfanelli, 2002 - endemic to Italy
- Alzoniella macrostoma Bodon & Cianfanelli, 2002 - endemic to Italy
- Alzoniella manganellii Bodon, Cianfanelli & Talenti, 1997 - endemic to Italy
- Alzoniella microstoma Bodon & Cianfanelli, 2002 - endemic to Italy
- Alzoniella parvula (Giusti & Bodon, 1981) - endemic to Italy
- Alzoniella sigestra Giusti & Bodon, 1984 - endemic to Italy
- Alzoniella tanagrensis Cianfanelli & Bodon, 2017 - endemic to Italy
- Arganiella pescei Giusti & Pezzoli, 1980 - endemic to Italy
- Belgrandia bonelliana De Stefani, 1879
- Belgrandia latina (Settepassi, 1965)
- Belgrandia mariatheresiae Giusti & Pezzoli, 1972 - endemic to Italy
- Belgrandia minuscula (Paulucci, 1881) - endemic to Italy
- Belgrandia stochi (Bodon, Manganelli & Giusti, 1996) - endemic to Italy
- Belgrandia thermalis (Linnaeus, 1767)
- Graziana alpestris (Frauenfeld, 1863)
- Graziana pupula (Westerlund, 1886)
- Hadziella anti Schütt, 1960
- Hadziella deminuta Bole, 1961
- Hadziella ephippiostoma Kuščer, 1932
- Hauffenia subpiscinalis (Kuščer, 1932)
- Hauffenia tellinii (Pollonera, 1898)
- Fissuria globosa Bodon & Cianfanelli, 2022 - endemic to Italy
- Fissuria planospira Bodon, Cianfanelli & Talenti, 1997
- Fissuria sossoi Bodon & Cianfanelli, 2022 - endemic to Italy
- Fissuria varicosa Bodon & Cianfanelli, 2022 - endemic to Italy
- Islamia cianensis Bodon, Manganelli, Sparacio & Giusti, 1995 - endemic to Italy
- Islamia gaiteri Bodon, Manganelli, Sparacio & Giusti, 1995 - endemic to Elba
- Islamia lanzai Bodon & Cianfanelli, 2012 - endemic to Italy
- Islamia pezzoliana Bodon & Cianfanelli, 2012 - endemic to Italy
- Islamia piristoma Bodon & Cianfanelli, 2002 - endemic to Italy
- Islamia pusilla (Piersanti, 1952)
- Islamia ruffoi Bodon & Cianfanelli, 2012 - endemic to Italy
- Islamia selensis Cianfanelli & Bodon, 2017 - endemic to Italy
- Islamia senensis Bodon & Cianfanelli, 2012 - endemic to Italy
- Islamia sulfurea Bodon, Cianfanelli & Montanari 2012 - endemic to Italy
- Istriana mirnae Velkovrh, 1971
- Litthabitella chilodia (Westerlund, 1886)
- Mercuria saharica (Letourneux & Bourguignat, 1887)
- Mercuria similis (Draparnaud, 1805)
- Mercuria zopissa (Paulucci, 1882)
- Orientalina callosa (Paulucci, 1881)
- Pauluccinella minima (Paulucci, 1881)
- Pezzolia radapalladis Bodon & Giusti, 1986 - endemic to Italy
- Phreatica bolei Velkovrh, 1970 - endemic to Italy
- Pseudamnicola conovula (Frauenfeld, 1863)
- Pseudamnicola lucensis (Issel, 1866) - endemic to Italy
- Pseudamnicola moussonii (Calcara, 1841)
- Pseudamnicola sciaccaensis Glöer & Beckmann, 2007 - endemic to Italy
- Pseudavenionia pedemontana Bodon & Giusti, 1982 - endemic to Italy
- Sadleriana fluminensis (Küster, 1853)
- Salenthydrobia ferrerii Wilke, 2003 - endemic to Italy
- Sardohoratia islamoides Manganelli, Bodon, Cianfanelli, Talenti & Giusti, 1998 - endemic to Sardinia
- Sardohoratia sulcata Manganelli, Bodon, Cianfanelli, Talenti & Giusti, 1998 - endemic to Sardinia

Moitessieriidae

- Bythiospeum vallei (Giusti & Pezzoli, 1976) - endemic to Italy
- Iglica concii (Allegretti, 1944) - endemic to Italy
- Iglica forumjuliana (Pollonera, 1887) - endemic to Italy
- Iglica giustii Bodon & Giovannelli, 1995 - endemic to Italy
- Iglica hauffeni (Brusina, 1886) - endemic to Italy
- Iglica pezzolii Boeters, 1971 - endemic to Italy
- Iglica tellinii (Pollonera, 1887) - endemic to Italy
- Iglica vobarnensis (Pezzoli & Toffoletto, 1968) - endemic to Italy
- Moitessieria massoti Bourguignat, 1864
- Moitessieria simoniana (Saint-Simon, 1848)
- Paladilhiopsis robiciana (Clessin, 1882)
- Paladilhiopsis virei (Locard, 1903)
- Sardopaladilhia plagigeyerica Manganelli, Bodon, Cianfanelli, Talenti & Giusti, 1998 - endemic to Sardinia

Tateidae

- Potamopyrgus antipodarum (Gray, 1843) - New Zealand mud snail

Melanopsidae

- Melanopsis etrusca Brot, 1862

== Land gastropods ==
Pomatiidae

- Pomatias elegans (O. F. Müller, 1774)

Aciculidae

- Acicula beneckei (Andreae, 1883) - endemic to Italy
- Acicula benoiti (Bourguignat, 1864) - endemic to Sicily
- Acicula disjuncta Boeters, Gittenberger & Subai, 1989
- Acicula giglioi Reitano, Nardi, Liberto, Sanfilippo, Di Franco, Viviano & Sparacio, 2022 - endemic to Sicily
  - Acicula giglioi giglioi Reitano, Nardi, Liberto, Sanfilippo, Di Franco, Viviano & Sparacio, 2022 - endemic to Sicily
  - Acicula giglioi peloritana Reitano, Nardi, Liberto, Sanfilippo, Di Franco, Viviano & Sparacio, 2022 - endemic to Sicily
- Acicula hierae Liberto, Reitano, Viviano & Sparacio, 2020 - endemic to Marettimo Island
- Acicula lineata sublineata (Andreae, 1883)
- Acicula lineolata (Pini, 1884)
  - Acicula lineolata lineolata (Pini, 1884)
  - Acicula lineolata banki Boeters, Gittenberger & Subai, 1989
- Acicula szigethyannae Subai, 1977
- Acicula vezzanii Bodon, 1994
- Platyla curtii (Wagner, 1912)
- Platyla foliniana (Nevill, 1879)
- Platyla gracilis (Clessin, 1877)
- Platyla microspira (Pini, 1884)
- Platyla pezzolii Boeters, Gittenberger & Subai, 1989 - endemic to Italy
- Platyla polita (Hartmann, 1840)
  - Platyla polita polita (Hartmann, 1840)
  - Platyla polita regina (Subai, 1977) - endemic to Italy
- Platyla sardoa Cianfanelli, Talenti, Bodon & Manganelli, 2000 - endemic to Sardinia
- Platyla similis (Reinhardt, 1880)
- Platyla stussinieri (Boettger, 1884)
- Platyla subdiaphana (Bivona, 1839) - endemic to Sicily
- Platyla talentii Bodon & Cianfanelli, 2008 - endemic to Italy
- Renea berica Niero, Nardi & Braccia, 2012 - endemic to Italy
- Renea bourguignatiana Nevill, 1880
- Renea elegantissima (Pini, 1886)
- Renea gentilei (Pollonera, 1889) - endemic to Italy
- Renea spectabilis (Rossmässler, 1839)
- Renea veneta (Pirona, 1865)

Cochlostomatidae

- Cochlostoma affine (Benoit, 1876) - endemic to Sicily
- Cochlostoma alleryanum (Paulucci, 1879) - endemic to Sicily
- Cochlostoma canestrinii (Adami, 1876) - endemic to Italy
- Cochlostoma crosseanum (Paulucci, 1879) - endemic to Italy
  - Cochlostoma crosseanum agriotes (Westerlund, 1879) - endemic to Italy
  - Cochlostoma crosseanum crosseanum (Paulucci, 1879) - endemic to Italy
- Cochlostoma gracile (L. Pfeiffer, 1849)
- Cochlostoma henricae (Strobel, 1851)
  - Cochlostoma henricae henricae (Strobel, 1851)
  - Cochlostoma henricae lissogyrus (Westerlund, 1881) - endemic to Italy
  - Cochlostoma henricae strigillatum (A. J. Wagner, 1897) - endemic to Italy
- Cochlostoma mariannae H. Nordsieck, 2011 - endemic to Italy
- Cochlostoma montanum (Issel, 1866) - endemic to Italy
  - Cochlostoma montanum cassiniacum (Saint-Simon, 1878) - endemic to Italy
  - Cochlostoma montanum montanum (Issel, 1866) - endemic to Italy
- Cochlostoma paladilhianum (Saint-Simon, 1869) - endemic to Sicily
- Cochlostoma philippianum (Gredler, 1853)
- Cochlostoma porroi (Strobel, 1850) - endemic to Italy
  - Cochlostoma porroi gredleri (Westerlund, 1879) - endemic to Italy
  - Cochlostoma porroi porroi (Strobel, 1850) - endemic to Italy
  - Cochlostoma porroi stabilei (Pini, 1885) - endemic to Italy
- Cochlostoma sardoum (Westerlund, 1890) - endemic to Sardinia
- Cochlostoma scalarinum (A. Villa & G. B. Villa, 1841)
- Cochlostoma septemspirale septemspirale (Razoumowsky, 1789)
- Cochlostoma simrothi (Caziot, 1908)
- Cochlostoma stelucarum Zallot, De Mattia, Fehér & Gittenberger, 2021
- Cochlostoma subalpinum (Pini, 1885)
- Cochlostoma tergestinum (Westerlund, 1878)
- Cochlostoma villae (Strobel, 1851)
- Cochlostoma westerlundi (Paulucci, 1879) - endemic to Italy
  - Cochlostoma westerlundi dionysi (Paulucci, 1879) - endemic to Sicily
  - Cochlostoma westerlundi westerlundi (Paulucci, 1879) - endemic to Italy
  - Cochlostoma westerlundi yapigium (Westerlund, 1885) - endemic to Italy
- Striolata striolata (Porro, 1840) - endemic to Italy

Cochlicopidae

- Cochlicopa lubrica (O. F. Müller, 1774)
- Cochlicopa lubricella (Porro, 1838)

Azecidae

- Gomeziella girottii (Esu, 1978) - endemic to Sardinia
- Gomphroa bisacchii (Giusti, 1970) - endemic to Sardinia
- Gomphroa cylindracea (Calcara, 1840) - endemic to Sicily
- Gomphroa dohrni (Paulucci, 1882) - endemic to Sardinia
- Gomphroa emiliana (Bourguignat, 1859) - endemic to Marettimo Island
- Gomphroa etrusca (Paulucci, 1886) - endemic to Italy
- Gomphroa incerta (Bourguignat, 1859) - endemic to the Aeolian Islands
- Hypnocarnica micaelae Cianfanelli & Bodon, 2018 - endemic to Italy

Chondrinidae

- Abida secale secale (Draparnaud, 1801)
- Chondrina arcadica clienta (Westerlund, 1883)
- Chondrina avenacea (Bruguière, 1792)
  - Chondrina avenacea avenacea (Bruguière, 1792)
  - Chondrina avenacea istriana Ehrmann, 1931
  - Chondrina avenacea latilabris (Stossich, 1895) - endemic to Italy
  - Chondrina avenacea lepta (Westerlund, 1887)
  - Chondrina avenacea lessinica (Adami, 1885) - endemic to Italy
  - Chondrina avenacea veneta H. Nordsieck, 1962 - endemic to Italy
- Chondrina bergomensis (Küster, 1850) - endemic to Italy
- Chondrina feneriensis Bodon, Nardi, Cianfanelli & Kokshoorn, 2015 - endemic to Italy
- Chondrina generosensis H. Nordsieck, 1962
- Chondrina megacheilos (De Cristofori & Jan, 1832)
  - Chondrina megacheilos avenoides (Westerlund, 1874) - endemic to Italy
  - Chondrina megacheilos caziotana Pilsbry, 1918 - endemic to Italy
  - Chondrina megacheilos frassineiana Nardi, 2009 - endemic to Italy
  - Chondrina megacheilos megacheilos (De Cristofori & Jan, 1832)
  - Chondrina megacheilos toscolana (Schröder, 1913) - endemic to Italy
- Chondrina multidentata (Strobel, 1851) - endemic to Italy
  - Chondrina multidentata gredleriana (Clessin, 1887 - endemic to Italy
  - Chondrina multidentata multidentata (Strobel, 1851) - endemic to Italy
  - Chondrina multidentata schista (Westerlund, 1887) - endemic to Italy
- Chondrina oligodonta (Del Prete, 1879) - endemic to Italy
- Granaria frumentum (Draparnaud, 1801)
  - Granaria frumentum apennina (Küster, 1847) - endemic to Italy
  - Granaria frumentum frumentum (Draparnaud, 1801)
  - Granaria frumentum illyrica (Rossmässler, 1835)
- Granaria stabilei (E. von Martens, 1865)
- Granopupa granum (Draparnaud, 1801)
- Rupestrella homala (Westerlund, 1892) - endemic to Sicily
  - Rupestrella homala falkneri Beckmann, 2002 - endemic to Sicily
  - Rupestrella homala homala (Westerlund, 1892) - endemic to Sicily
  - Rupestrella homala massae Beckmann, 2002 - endemic to Sicily
- Rupestrella occulta (Rossmässler, 1839) - endemic to Sicily
  - Rupestrella occulta gibilfunnensis (De Gregorio, 1895) - endemic to Sicily
  - Rupestrella occulta occulta (Rossmässler, 1839) - endemic to Sicily
- Rupestrella philippii (Cantraine, 1840)
- Rupestrella rupestris (Philippi, 1836)
  - Rupestrella rupestris carolae Beckmann, 2002 - endemic to Sicily
  - Rupestrella rupestris lamellosa Beckmann, 2002 - endemic to Sicily
  - Rupestrella rupestris margritae Beckmann, 2002 - endemic to Sicily
  - Rupestrella rupestris rupestris (Philippi, 1836)
- Solatopupa guidoni (Caziot, 1904)
- Solatopupa juliana (Issel, 1866) - endemic to Italy
- Solatopupa pallida (Rossmässler, 1842) - endemic to Italy
- Solatopupa psarolena (Bourguignat, 1858)
- Solatopupa similis (Bruguière, 1792)

Lauriidae

- Lauria cylindracea (Da Costa, 1778)

Valloniidae

- Plagyrona angusta D.T. Holyoak & G.A. Holyoak, 2012
- Plagyrona placida (Shuttleworth, 1852)
- Vallonia costata (O. F. Müller, 1774)
- Vallonia enniensis (Gredler, 1856)
- Vallonia excentrica Sterki, 1893
- Vallonia pulchella (O.F. Müller, 1774)
- Vallonia suevica Geyer, 1908

Truncatellinidae

- Truncatellina cylindrica (Férussac, 1807)

Vertiginidae

- Vertigo alpestris Alder, 1838
- Vertigo angustior Jeffreys, 1830
- Vertigo antivertigo (Draparnaud, 1801)
- Vertigo genesii (Gredler, 1856)
- Vertigo geyeri Lindholm, 1925
- Vertigo moulinsiana (Dupuy, 1849) - Desmoulin's whorl snail
- Vertigo pusilla O. F. Müller, 1774
- Vertigo pygmaea (Draparnaud, 1801)

Clausiliidae

- Alinda biplicata biplicata (Montagu, 1803)
- Balea perversa (Linnaeus, 1758)
- Bulgarica thessalonica (Rossmässler, 1839)
- Charpentieria dyodon (S. Studer, 1820)
  - Charpentieria dyodon alpina (Stabile, 1859) - endemic to Italy
  - Charpentieria dyodon dyodon (S. Studer, 1820)
  - Charpentieria dyodon paulucciana (Pollonera, 1885) - endemic to Italy
  - Charpentieria dyodon thomasiana (Küster, 1850) - endemic to Italy
- Charpentieria itala (G. von Martens, 1824)
  - Charpentieria itala albopustulata (De Cristofori & Jan, 1832) - endemic to Italy
  - Charpentieria itala allatollae (Käufel, 1928) - endemic to Italy
  - Charpentieria itala baldensis (Charpentier, 1852) - endemic to Italy
  - Charpentieria itala balsamoi (Strobel, 1850) - endemic to Italy
  - Charpentieria itala braunii (Rossmässler, 1836)
  - Charpentieria itala clavata (Rossmässler, 1836) - endemic to Italy
  - Charpentieria itala itala (G. v. Martens, 1824) - endemic to Italy
  - Charpentieria itala latestriata (Küster, 1850) - endemic to Italy
  - Charpentieria itala leccoensis (Saint-Simon, 1848)
  - Charpentieria itala lorinae (Gredler, 1869) - endemic to Italy
  - Charpentieria itala punctata (Michaud, 1831)
  - Charpentieria itala rubiginea (Rossmässler, 1836) - endemic to Italy
  - Charpentieria itala serravalensis (H. Nordsieck, 1963) - endemic to Italy
  - Charpentieria itala tiesenhauseni (Gredler, 1885) - endemic to Italy
  - Charpentieria itala trepida (Käufel, 1928) - endemic to Italy
  - Charpentieria itala triumplinae Nardi, 2011 - endemic to Italy
  - Charpentieria itala variscoi (Pini, 1883) - endemic to Italy
  - Charpentieria itala zalloti De Mattia, Reier & Haring, 2021 - endemic to Italy
- Charpentieria stenzii (Rossmässler, 1836)
  - Charpentieria stenzii butoti Bank, 1987 - endemic to Italy
  - Charpentieria stenzii cincta (Brumati, 1838)
  - Charpentieria stenzii faueri Bank, 1987 - endemic to Italy
  - Charpentieria stenzii letochana (Gredler, 1874) - endemic to Italy
  - Charpentieria stenzii nordsiecki Fauer, 1991 - endemic to Italy
  - Charpentieria stenzii paroliniana (De Betta & Martinati, 1855) - endemic to Italy
  - Charpentieria stenzii stenzii (Rossmässler, 1836) - endemic to Italy
  - Charpentieria stenzii westerlundi H. Nordsieck, 1993 - endemic to Italy
- Clausilia cruciata cruciata (Studer, 1820)
- Clausilia dubia Draparnaud, 1805
- Clausilia brembina Strobel, 1850 - endemic to Italy
  - Clausilia brembina alanica H. Nordsieck, 2013 - endemic to Italy
  - Clausilia brembina brembina Strobel, 1850 - endemic to Italy
  - Clausilia brembina gardonensis Nardi & H. Nordsieck, 2013 - endemic to Italy
  - Clausilia brembina klemmi H. Nordsieck, 1966 - endemic to Italy
  - Clausilia brembina umbrosa (Käufel, 1928) - endemic to Italy
- Clausilia whateliana Charpentier, 1850 - endemic to Italy
  - Clausilia whateliana exoptata A. Schmidt, 1856 - endemic to Italy
  - Clausilia whateliana whateliana Charpentier, 1850 - endemic to Italy
- Clausilia umbrosella Nordsieck, 1993 - endemic to Italy
- Cochlodina bidens (Linnaeus, 1758)
- Cochlodina comensis (L. Pfeiffer, 1850)
  - Cochlodina comensis comensis (L. Pfeiffer, 1850)
  - Cochlodina comensis lucensis (Gentiluomo, 1868)
  - Cochlodina comensis trilamellata (A. Schmidt, 1868)
- Cochlodina costata (Pfeiffer, 1828)
  - Cochlodina costata curta (Rossmässler, 1836)
  - Cochlodina costata fusca (De Betta, 1852)
  - Cochlodina costata natisonensis H. Nordsieck, 2007
  - Cochlodina costata psila (Westerlund, 1884)
  - Cochlodina costata ungulata (Rossmässler, 1835)
- Cochlodina dubiosa dubiosa (Clessin, 1882)
- Cochlodina fimbriata fimbriata (Rossmässler, 1835)
- Cochlodina laminata (Montagu, 1803)
  - Cochlodina laminata grossa (Rossmässler, 1835)
  - Cochlodina laminata laminata (Montagu, 1803)
- Cochlodina kuesteri (Rossmässler, 1836) - endemic to Sardinia
  - Cochlodina kuesteri kuesteri (Rossmässler, 1836) - endemic to Sardinia
  - Cochlodina kuesteri sassariensis H. Nordsieck, 1969 - endemic to Sardinia
- Cochlodina orthostoma orthostoma (Menke, 1828)
- Cochlodina triloba (O. Boettger, 1877)
- Delima bilabiata biasolettiana (Charpentier, 1852)
- Dilataria boettgeriana (Paulucci, 1878) - endemic to Italy
- Dilataria succineata (Rossmässler, 1836)
- Erjavecia bergeri (Rossmässler, 1836)
- Fusulus interruptus (C. Pfeiffer, 1828)
- Gibbularia gibbula (Rossmässler, 1836)
  - Gibbularia gibbula gibbula (Rossmässler, 1836)
  - Gibbularia gibbula honii (Tiberi, 1878) - endemic to Italy
  - Gibbularia gibbula multiplex (Westerlund, 1884) - endemic to Italy
  - Gibbularia gibbula niethammeri (B. Rensch, 1934) - endemic to Italy
  - Gibbularia gibbula sanctangeli (A. J. Wagner, 1925) - endemic to Italy
  - Gibbularia gibbula selecta (Monterosato, 1908) - endemic to Italy
- Julica schmidtii schmidtii (L. Pfeiffer, 1841)
- Laciniaria plicata plicata (Draparnaud, 1801)
- Lampedusa lopadusae (Calcara, 1846) - endemic to Italy
  - Lampedusa lopadusae lopadusae (Calcara, 1846) - endemic to Lampedusa Island
  - Lampedusa lopadusae nodulosa (Monterosato, 1892) - endemic to Lampione Island
- Leucostigma candidescens (Rossmässler, 1835) - endemic to Italy
  - Leucostigma candidescens candidescens (Rossmässler, 1835) - endemic to Italy
  - Leucostigma candidescens convertitum (Flach, 1907) - endemic to Italy
  - Leucostigma candidescens dextromira H. Nordsieck, 2011 - endemic to Italy
  - Leucostigma candidescens leucostigma (Rossmässler, 1836) - endemic to Italy
  - Leucostigma candidescens megachilus (Paulucci, 1881) - endemic to Italy
  - Leucostigma candidescens monticola H. Nordsieck, 2011 - endemic to Italy
  - Leucostigma candidescens opalinum (Rossmässler, 1836) - endemic to Italy
  - Leucostigma candidescens paraconvertitum H. Nordsieck, 2011 - endemic to Italy
  - Leucostigma candidescens samniticum (Rossmässler, 1842) - endemic to Italy
- Macrogastra asphaltina Rossmässler, 1836
- Macrogastra attenuata (Rossmässler, 1835)
  - Macrogastra attenuata attenuata (Rossmässler, 1835)
  - Macrogastra attenuata iriana (Pollonera, 1885) - endemic to Italy
  - Macrogastra attenuata lineolata (Held, 1836)
  - Macrogastra attenuata modulata (A. Schmidt, 1856) - endemic to Italy
  - Macrogastra attenuata tenuistriata (Pini, 1879) - endemic to Italy
- Macrogastra badia (C. Pfeiffer, 1828)
  - Macrogastra badia alpina H. Nordsieck, 2006
  - Macrogastra badia mucida (Rossmässler, 1835)
- Macrogastra mellae mellae (Stabile, 1864)
- Macrogastra plicatula (Draparnaud, 1801)
  - Macrogastra plicatula amiatensis H. Nordsieck, 2006 - endemic to Italy
  - Macrogastra plicatula apennina (Gentiluomo, 1868) - endemic to Italy
  - Macrogastra plicatula aprutica H. Nordsieck, 2006 - endemic to Italy
  - Macrogastra plicatula licana (A. J. Wagner, 1912)
  - Macrogastra plicatula plicatula (Draparnaud, 1801)
  - Macrogastra plicatula superflua (Charpentier, 1852)
- Macrogastra ventricosa ventricosa (Draparnaud, 1801)
- Mauritanica scarificata (L. Pfeiffer, 1856) - endemic to Marretimo Island
- Medora garganensis (A. J. Wagner, 1918) - endemic to Italy
- Medora italiana (Küster, 1847) - endemic to Italy
  - Medora italiana italiana (Küster, 1847) - endemic to Italy
  - Medora italiana kobelti H. Nordsieck, 1970 - endemic to Italy
- Medora milettiana Giusti, 1967 - endemic to Italy
- Medora pollinensis H. Nordsieck, 2012 - endemic to Italy
- Medora punctulata (Küster, 1850) - endemic to Italy
  - Medora punctulata peloritana Reitano, Liberto & Sparacio, 2007 - endemic to Sicily
  - Medora punctulata punctulata (Küster, 1850) - endemic to Italy
- Muticaria brancatoi Colomba, Reitano, Liberto, Giglio, Gregorini & Sparacio, 2012
- Muticaria cyclopica Liberto, Reitano, Giglio, Colomba & Sparacio, 2016
- Muticaria neuteboomi Beckmann, 1990
- Muticaria syracusana (Philippi, 1836)
- Neostyriaca corynodes corynodes (Held, 1836)
- Neostyriaca strobel (Strobel, 1850)
- Papillifera papillaris (O. F. Müller, 1774)
  - Papillifera papillaris affinis (Philippi, 1836) - endemic to Italy
  - Papillifera papillaris papillaris (O. F. Müller, 1774)
  - Papillifera papillaris rudicosta (O. Boettger, 1878) - endemic to Sicily
  - Papillifera papillaris tinei (Westerlund, 1878) - endemic to Sicily
  - Papillifera papillaris transitans (Paulucci, 1878) - endemic to Italy
- Papillifera solida (Draparnaud, 1805) - endemic to Italy
  - Papillifera solida caietana (Rossmässler, 1842)
  - Papillifera solida deburghiae (Paulucci, 1878) - endemic to Italy
  - Papillifera solida diabolina H. Nordsieck, 2013 - endemic to Italy
  - Papillifera solida pseudobidens H. Nordsieck, 2013 - endemic to Italy
  - Papillifera solida solida (Draparnaud, 1805) - endemic to Italy
- Ruthenica filograna (Rossmässler, 1836)
- Pseudofusulus varians (C. Pfeiffer, 1828)
- Sicania crassicostata (L. Pfeiffer, 1856) - endemic to Sicily
- Sicania eminens (A. Schmidt, 1868) - endemic to Sicily
- Sicania nobilis (L. Pfeiffer, 1848) - endemic to Sicily
  - Sicania nobilis nobilis (L. Pfeiffer, 1848) - endemic to Sicily
  - Sicania nobilis spezialensis (H. Nordsieck, 1984) - endemic to Sicily
- Siciliaria calcarae (Philippi, 1844) - endemic to Sicily
  - Siciliaria calcarae belliemii R. A. Brandt, 1961 - endemic to Sicily
  - Siciliaria calcarae borgettensis De Mattia, Reier & Haring, 2021 - endemic to Sicily
  - Siciliaria calcarae calcarae (Philippi, 1844) - endemic to Sicily
  - Siciliaria calcarae cruenta De Mattia, Reier & Haring, 2021 - endemic to Sicily
  - Siciliaria calcarae jatinensis De Mattia, Reier & Haring, 2021 - endemic to Sicily
  - Siciliaria calcarae orlandoi Liberto, Reitano, Giglio, Colomba & Sparacio, 2016 - endemic to Sicily
  - Siciliaria calcarae parajatinensis De Mattia, Reier & Haring, 2021 - endemic to Sicily
- Siciliaria ferrox R. A. Brandt, 1961 - endemic to Sicily
- Siciliaria grohmanniana (Rossmässler, 1836) - endemic to Sicily
  - Siciliaria grohmanniana addaurae De Mattia, Reier & Haring, 2021 - endemic to Sicily
  - Siciliaria grohmanniana grohmanniana (Rossmässler, 1836) - endemic to Sicily
- Siciliaria leucophryna (L. Pfeiffer, 1862) - endemic to Sicily
- Siciliaria septemplicata (Philippi, 1836) - endemic to Sicily
- Siciliaria tiberii (A. Schmidt, 1868) - endemic to Sicily
  - Siciliaria tiberii alcamoensis De Mattia, Reier & Haring, 2021 - endemic to Sicily
  - Siciliaria tiberii armettensis De Mattia, Reier & Haring, 2021 - endemic to Sicily
  - Siciliaria tiberii scalettensis (Beckmann, 2004) - endemic to Sicily
- Stigmatica ernae (Fauer, 1978) - endemic to Italy
- Stigmatica incerta (Küster, 1861) - endemic to Italy
- Stigmatica kobeltiana (Küster, 1876) - endemic to Italy
- Stigmatica paestana (Philippi, 1836) - endemic to Italy
  - Stigmatica paestana intustructa (Westerlund, 1883) - endemic to Italy
  - Stigmatica paestana paestana (Philippi, 1836) - endemic to Italy
- Stigmatica piceata (Rossmässler, 1836) - endemic to Italy
- Stigmatica vulcanica (Benoit, 1860) - endemic to Italy
  - Stigmatica vulcanica sigridae (H. Nordsieck, 2013) - endemic to Italy
  - Stigmatica vulcanica vulcanica (Benoit, 1860) - endemic to Italy

Achatinidae

- Rumina decollata (Linnaeus, 1758) - decollate snail
- Rumina saharica Pallary, 1901

Discidae

- Discus rotundatus (O. F. Müller, 1774) - rotund disc

Oxychilidae

- Carpathica langi (L. Pfeiffer, 1846)
- Daudebardia brevipes (Draparnaud, 1805)
- Daudebardia rufa (Draparnaud, 1805)
- Mediterranea adamii (Westerlund, 1886) - endemic to Italy
- Mediterranea depressa (Sterki, 1880)
- Mediterranea hydatina (Rossmässler, 1838)
- Mediterranea polygyra (Pollonera, 1885) - endemic to Italy
- Morlina glabra (Rossmässler, 1835)
  - Morlina glabra ercica (Benoit, 1859) - endemic to Italy
  - Morlina glabra glabra (Rossmässler, 1835)
- Oxychilus alicurensis (Benoit, 1857) - endemic to Alicudi Island
- Oxychilus canini (Benoit, 1843) - endemic to Sicily
- Oxychilus clarus (Held, 1838)
- Oxychilus egadiensis Riedel, 1973 - endemic to Favignana & Levanzo Island
- Oxychilus denatale (L. Pfeiffer, 1856) - endemic to Marettimo Island
- Oxychilus diductus (Westerlund, 1886) - endemic to Lampedusa Island
- Oxychilus draparnaudi (Beck, 1837)
- Oxychilus fuscosus (Rossmässler, 1838)
- Oxychilus gardinii Manganelli, Bodon & Giusti, 1991- endemic to Italy
- Oxychilus lagrecai Giusti, 1973 - endemic to Filicudi Island
- Oxychilus majori (Westerlund, 1886) - endemic to Italy
- Oxychilus meridionalis (Paulucci, 1881) - endemic to Italy
- Oxychilus mortilleti (L. Pfeiffer, 1859)
- Oxychilus nortoni (Calcara, 1843) - endemic to Ustica Island
- Oxychilus oglasicola Giusti, 1968 - endemic to Montecristo Island
- Oxychilus oppressus (Shuttleworth, 1877) - endemic to Sardinia
- Oxychilus paulucciae (De Stefani, 1883) - endemic to Italy
- Oxychilus perspectivus (Kobelt, 1881)
- Oxychilus pilula (Westerlund, 1886) - endemic to Capraia Island
- Oxychilus uziellii (Issel, 1872) - endemic to Italy
- Schistophallus carotii (Paulucci, 1878) - endemic to Italy

Pristilomatidae

- Vitrea botterii (L. Pfeiffer, 1853)
- Vitrea contracta (Westerlund, 1871)
- Vitrea erjaveci (Brusina, 1870)
- Vitrea etrusca (Paulucci, 1878)
- Vitrea garganoensis (Gittenberger & Eikenboom, 2006) - endemic to Italy
- Vitrea minellii L. Pintér & F. Giusti, 1983 - endemic to Italy
- Vitrea pseudotrolli (Pinter, 1983)
- Vitrea subrimata (Reinhardt, 1871)
- Vitrea trolli (A. J. Wagner, 1922)

Gastrodontidae

- Aegopinella cisalpina Riedel, 1983
- Aegopinella forcarti Riedel, 1983
- Aegopinella graziadei (Boeckel, 1940)
- Aegopinella minor (Stabile, 1864)
- Aegopinella nitens (Michaud, 1831)
- Aegopinella pura (Alder, 1830)
- Aegopinella ressmanni (Westerlund, 1883)
- Perpolita hammonis (Strøm, 1765)
- Perpolita petronella (L. Pfeiffer, 1853)
- Retinella giustii A. Riedel, 1998 - endemic to Italy
- Retinella hiulca (Albers, 1850)
- Retinella olivetorum (Gmelin, 1791) - endemic to Italy
  - Retinella olivetorum icterica (Tiberi, 1872) - endemic to Italy
  - Retinella olivetorum olivetorum (Gmelin, 1791) - endemic to Italy
- Retinella pseudoaegopinella Giusti, Boato & Bodon, 1986 - endemic to Italy
- Retinella stabilei (Pollonera, 1886) - endemic to Italy
- Zonitoides nitidus (O. F. Müller, 1774)

Zonitidae

- Aegopis gemonensis (A. Férussac, 1832)
- Aegopis italicus (Kobelt, 1876) - endemic to Italy
- Aegopis verticillus (Férussac, 1819)
- Zonites algirus (Linnaeus, 1758)

Spiraxidae

- Poiretia cornea (Brumati, 1838)
- Poiretia dilatata dilatata (Philippi, 1836) - endemic to Italy
- Sardopoiretia emanueli Bodon, Nardi, Braccia & Cianfanelli, 2010 - endemic to Sardinia

Testacellidae

- Testacella bracciai Nardi & Bodon, 2011 - endemic to Italy
- Testacella gestroi Issel, 1873
- Testacella haliotidea Draparnaud, 1801 - shelled slug
- Testacella scutulum Sowerby, 1821

Limacidae

- Ambigolimax melitensis (Lessona & Pollonera, 1882)
- Limax brandstetteri Falkner, 2008

Milacidae

- Tandonia marinellii Liberto, Giglio, Colomba & Sparacio, 2012 - endemic to Sicily
- Tandonia nigra (C. Pfeiffer, 1894)

Canariellidae

- Schileykiella bodoni Cianfanelli, Manganelli & Giusti, 2004 - endemic to Marettimo Island
- Schileykiella mariarosariae R. Viviano, A. Viviano, Liberto, Reitano & Sparacio, 2019 - endemic to Sicily
- Schileykiella parlatoris (Bivona, 1839) - endemic to Sicily
- Schileykiella reinae (L. Pfeiffer, 1856) - endemic to Sicily
- Tyrrheniellina josephi (Giusti & Manganelli, 1989) - endemic to Sardinia

Geomitridae

- Backeljaia gigaxii (L. Pfeiffer, 1847)
- Candidula cavannae (Paulucci, 1881)
- Candidula conglomeratica Bodon, Cianfanelli, Chueca & Pfenninger, 2020
- Candidula unifasciata (Poiret, 1801)
- Cochlicella acuta (O. F. Müller, 1774)
- Cochlicella barbara (Linnaeus, 1758)
- Cochlicella conoidea (Draparnaud, 1801)
- Cernuella aginnica (Locard, 1882)
- Cernuella amanda (Rossmässler, 1838) - endemic to Sicily
- Cernuella aradasii (Pirajno, 1842) - endemic to Sicily
- Cernuella caruanae (Kobelt, 1888) - endemic to Italy
- Cernuella cisalpina (Rossmässler, 1837)
- Cernuella hydruntina (Kobelt, 1883)
- Cernuella lampedusae (Kobelt, 1890) - endemic to the islands Lampedusa and probably Pantelleria
- Cernuella neglecta (Draparnaud, 1805)
- Cernuella rugosa (Lamarck, 1822) - endemic to Sicily
- Cernuella tineana (Benoit, 1862) - endemic to Sicily
- Cernuella virgata (Da Costa, 1778)
- Cernuellopsis ghisottii Manganelli & Giusti, 1988 - endemic to Italy
- Helicotricha carusoi Giusti, Manganelli & Crisci, 1992 - endemic to the Eolian Islands
- Ichnusomunda sacchii Giusti & Manganelli, 1998 - endemic to Sardinia
- Ichnusomunda usticensis (Calcara, 1842) - endemic to Ustica Island
- Microxeromagna lowei (Potiez & Michaud, 1838)
- Trochoidea caroni (Deshayes, 1832) - endemic to Italy
- Trochoidea cumiae (Calcara, 1847) - endemic to Lampedusa Island
- Trochoidea elegans (Gmelin, 1791)
- Trochoidea pyramidata (Draparnaud, 1805)
- Trochoidea trochoides (Poiret, 1789)
- Xerocrassa geyeri (Soós, 1926)
- Xerocrassa meda (Porro, 1840)
- Xerogyra fiorii (Alzona & Alzona Bisacchi, 1938) - endemic to Italy
- Xerogyra grovesiana (Paulucci, 1881) - endemic to Italy
- Xerogyra spadae (Calcara, 1845) - endemic to Italy
- Xerolenta obvia (Menke, 1828)
- Xeromunda durieui (L. Pfeiffer, 1848)
- Xeropicta derbentina (Krynicki, 1836)
- Xerosecta brachyflagellata De Mattia & Mascia, 2014 - endemic to Sardinia
- Xerosecta cespitum (Draparnaud, 1801)
- Xerosecta contermina (L. Pfeiffer, 1848) - endemic to Italy
- Xerosecta dohrni (Paulucci, 1882) - endemic to Sardinia
- Xerosecta giustii Manganelli & Favelli, 1996 - endemic to Italy
- Xerosecta sandaliotica De Mattia & Mascia, 2014 - endemic to Sardinia
- Xerotricha apicina (Lamarck, 1822)
- Xerotricha conspurcata (Draparnaud, 1801)

Trissexodontidae

- Caracollina lenticula (Férussac, 1821)

Helicidae

- Arianta arbustorum (Linnaeus, 1758) - copse snail
  - Arianta arbustorum arbustorum (Linnaeus, 1758)
  - Arianta arbustorum doriae (Paulucci, 1878) - endemic to Italy
  - Arianta arbustorum repellini (Reeve, 1852)
  - Arianta arbustorum stenzii (Rossmässler, 1835)
- Arianta chamaeleon (Pfeiffer, 1868)
- Cantareus apertus (Born, 1778) - green garden snail
- Caucasotachea vindobonensis (Férussac, 1821)
- Causa holosericea (S. Studer, 1820)
- Cepaea nemoralis (Linnaeus, 1758)
- Chilostoma cingulatum (S. Studer, 1820)
- Chilostoma fontenillii (Michaud, 1829)
- Chilostoma frigidum (De Cristofori & Jan, 1832)
- Chilostoma millieri (Bourguignat, 1880)
- Chilostoma zonatum (Studer, 1820)
- Chilostoma achates (Rossmässler, 1835)
- Chilostoma adelozona (Strobel, 1857)
- Chilostoma intermedium (Férussac, 1821)
- Chilostoma illyricum (Stabile, 1864)
- Cornu aspersum (O.F. Müller, 1774)
- Cornu cephalaeditana (Giannuzzi-Savelli, Sparacio & Oliva, 1986) - endemic to Sicily
- Cornu mazzullii (De Cristofori & Jan, 1832) - endemic to Sicily
- Cornu insolida (Monterosato, 1892) - endemic to Sicily
- Delphinatia glacialis (Férussac, 1832)
- Eobania vermiculata (O.F. Müller, 1774)
- Helicigona lapicida (Linnaeus, 1758)
- Helix cincta O.F. Müller, 1774
- Helix delpretiana Paulucci, 1878
- Helix ligata O.F. Müller, 1774
- Helix lucorum (Linnaeus, 1758)
- Helix mileti Kobelt, 1906
- Helix pomatia (Linnaeus, 1758)
- Helix straminea Briganti, 1825
- Isognomostoma isognomostomos (Schröter, 1784)
- Kosicia ambrosi (Strobel, 1851)
- Macularia niciensis (A. Férussac, 1821)
- Macularia sylvatica (Draparnaud, 1801)
- Marmorana fuscolabiata (Rossmässler, 1842) - endemic to Italy
- Marmorana globularis (Phlippi, 1836) - endemic to Sicily
- Marmorana muralis (O.F. Müller, 1774)
- Marmorana nebrodensis (Pirajno, 1842) - endemic to Sicily
- Marmorana platychela (Menke, 1830) - endemic to Sicily
- Marmorana scabriuscula (Deshayes, 1830) - endemic to Sicily
- Marmorana serpentina (A. Férussac, 1821)
- Marmorana saxetana (Paulucci, 1886) - endemic to Italy
- Marmorana signata (Férussac, 1821) - endemic to Italy
- Otala punctata (O.F. Müller, 1774)
- Tacheocampylaea carotii (Paulucci, 1882)
- Tacheocampylaea tacheoides (Pollonera, 1909)
- Theba pisana pisana (O.F. Müller, 1774)
- Tyrrheniberus ridens (Martens, 1884) - endemic to Sardinia
- Tyrrheniberus sardonius (Martens, 1884) - endemic to Sardinia
- Tyrrheniberus villicus (Paulucci, 1882) - endemic to Sardinia

Helicodontidae

- Drepanostoma nautiliforme Porro, 1836
- Helicodonta angigyra (Rossmässler, 1834)
- Helicodonta obvoluta (O. F. Müller, 1774)
- Falkneria camerani (Lessona, 1880) - endemic to Italy
- Lindholmiola girva (Frivaldszky, 1835)

Hygromiidae

- Ciliellopsis oglasae Giusti & Manganelli, 1990 - endemic to Montecristo Island
- Edentiella leucozona heteromorpha (Westerlund, 1876)
- Monacha cantiana (Montagu, 1803)
- Monacha cartusiana (O.F. Müller, 1774)
- Monacha pantanellii (De Stefani, 1879)
- Monacha parumcincta (Rossmässler, 1834)
- Pseudotrichia rubiginosa (Rossmässler, 1838)
- Tyrrheniella josephi (Giusti & Manganelli, 1989)

Sphincterochilidae

- Sphincterochila candidissima (Draparnaud, 1801)

== Freshwater bivalves ==
- Unio elongatulus C. Pfeiffer, 1825
- Unio mancus Lamarck, 1819

== Hothouse aliens ==
"Hothouse aliens" in Italy include:

== See also ==
Lists of molluscs of surrounding countries:

- List of non-marine molluscs of France
- List of non-marine molluscs of Switzerland
- List of non-marine molluscs of Austria
- List of non-marine molluscs of Slovenia
- List of non-marine molluscs of Malta
