= List of non-marine molluscs of Malta =

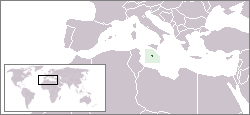
Location of Malta

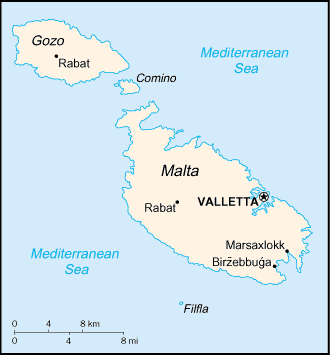
topography of Malta

The non-marine molluscs of Malta are a part of the molluscan fauna of Malta (wildlife of Malta).

A number of species of non-marine molluscs are found in the wild in Malta. There are 78 species of gastropods, 15 species of freshwater gastropods, 62 species of land gastropods) and 2 species of bivalves living in the wild.

There are 5 non-indigenous species of gastropods (2 freshwater and 2 land species). There are no non-indigenous species of bivalves in the wild in Malta.

Summary table of number of species:
Numbers of molluscs by habitat	Number of species (according to this list)
Freshwater gastropods	15
Land gastropods	62
Total number of non-marine gastropods	77
Freshwater bivalves	2
Total number of non-marine molluscs	79

== Freshwater gastropods ==
Freshwater gastropods in Malta include:

Hydrobiidae

- Hydrobia acuta (Draparnaud, 1805) - in brackish water
- Hydrobia ventrosa (Montagu, 1803) - in brackish water
- Paludinella littorina (Delle Chiaje, 1828) - in brackish water
- Pseudamnicola moussoni (Calcara, 1841)
- Heleobia stagnorum (Gmelin, 1791) - synonym: Littorinida stagnorum (Gmelin, 1791) - in brackish water
- Mercuria similis (Draparnaud, 1805)

Thiaridae

- Melanoides tuberculata (O. F. Müller, 1774) - probably locally extinct

Lymnaeidae

- Galba truncatula (O. F. Müller, 1774)
- Radix peregra (O. F. Müller, 1774) - probably locally extinct

Physidae

- Physella acuta Draparnaud, 1805 - non-indigenous

Planorbidae

- Planorbis moquini Requien, 1848
- Planorbis planorbis (Linnaeus, 1758) - probably locally extinct
- Gyraulus laevis (Alder, 1838)
- Helisoma duryi Wetherby, 1879 - non-indigenous
- Ancylus fluviatilis (O. F. Müller, 1774)

== Land gastropods ==
Land gastropods in Malta include:

Pomatiidae

- Pomatias elegans (O. F. Müller, 1774) - non-indigenous
- Tudorella sulcata (Draparnaud, 1805)

Truncatellidae

- Truncatella subcylindrica (Linnaeus, 1767) - partly marine, partly land snail

Ellobiidae

- Leucophytia bidentata (Montagu, 1808) - semi-marine
- Ovatella firminii (Payraudeau, 1826) - semi-marine
- Myosotella myosotis (Draparnaud, 1801) - semi-marine
- Carychium schlickumi Strauch, 1977

Lauriidae

- Lauria cylindracea (Da Costa, 1778)

Valloniidae

- Vallonia pulchella (O. F. Müller, 1774)

Vertiginidae

- Truncatellina callicratis (Scacchi, 1833)

Pleurodiscidae

- Pleurodiscus balmei (Potiez & Michaud, 1838)

Chondrinidae

- Granopupa granum (Draparnaud, 1801)
- Rupestrella philippii (Cantraine, 1840)

Enidae

- Mastus pupa (Linnaeus, 1758)

Clausiliidae

- Lampedusa imitatrix (O. Boettger, 1879) - Lampedusa imitatrix imitatrix (O. Boettger, 1879) - endemic; Lampedusa imitatrix melitensis (Gatto, 1892) - endemic
- Muticaria macrostoma (Cantraine, 1835) - Muticaria macrostoma macrostoma (Cantraine, 1835) - endemic; Muticaria macrostoma oscitans (Charpentier, 1852) - endemic; Muticaria macrostoma macrostoma × Muticaria macrostoma oscitans - endemic; Muticaria macrostoma macrostoma × Muticaria macrostoma scalaris
- hybrid Lampedusa imitatrix imitatrix × Muticaria macrostoma macrostoma
- Muticaria macrostoma (Gulia, 1861) - Muticaria macrostoma mamotica (Gulia, 1861) - endemic; Muticaria macrostoma scalaris (L. Pfeiffer, 1848) - endemic
- Papillifera papillaris (O. F. Müller, 1774)

Ferussaciidae

- Ferussacia folliculum (Gronovius, 1781)
- Cecilioides acicula (O. F. Müller, 1774)
- Cecilioides janii (De Betta & Martinati, 1855)
- Cecilioides petitiana (Benoit, 1862)
- Hohenwartiana hohenwarti (Rossmässler, 1839)

Subulinidae

- Rumina decollata (Linnaeus, 1758)

Testacellidae

- Testacella riedeli Guisti, Manganelli & Schembri, 1995

Discidae

- Discus rotundatus (O. F. Müller, 1774) - non-indigenous

Succineidae

- Oxyloma elegans (Risso, 1826)

Pristilomatidae

- Vitrea contracta (Westerlund, 1871)
- Vitrea subrimata (Reinhardt, 1871)

Oxychilidae

- Mediterranea hydatina (Rossmässler, 1838)
- Oxychilus draparnaudi (Beck, 1837)

Milacidae

- Milax nigricans (Schultz, 1836)
- Tandonia sowerbyi (Férussac, 1823)

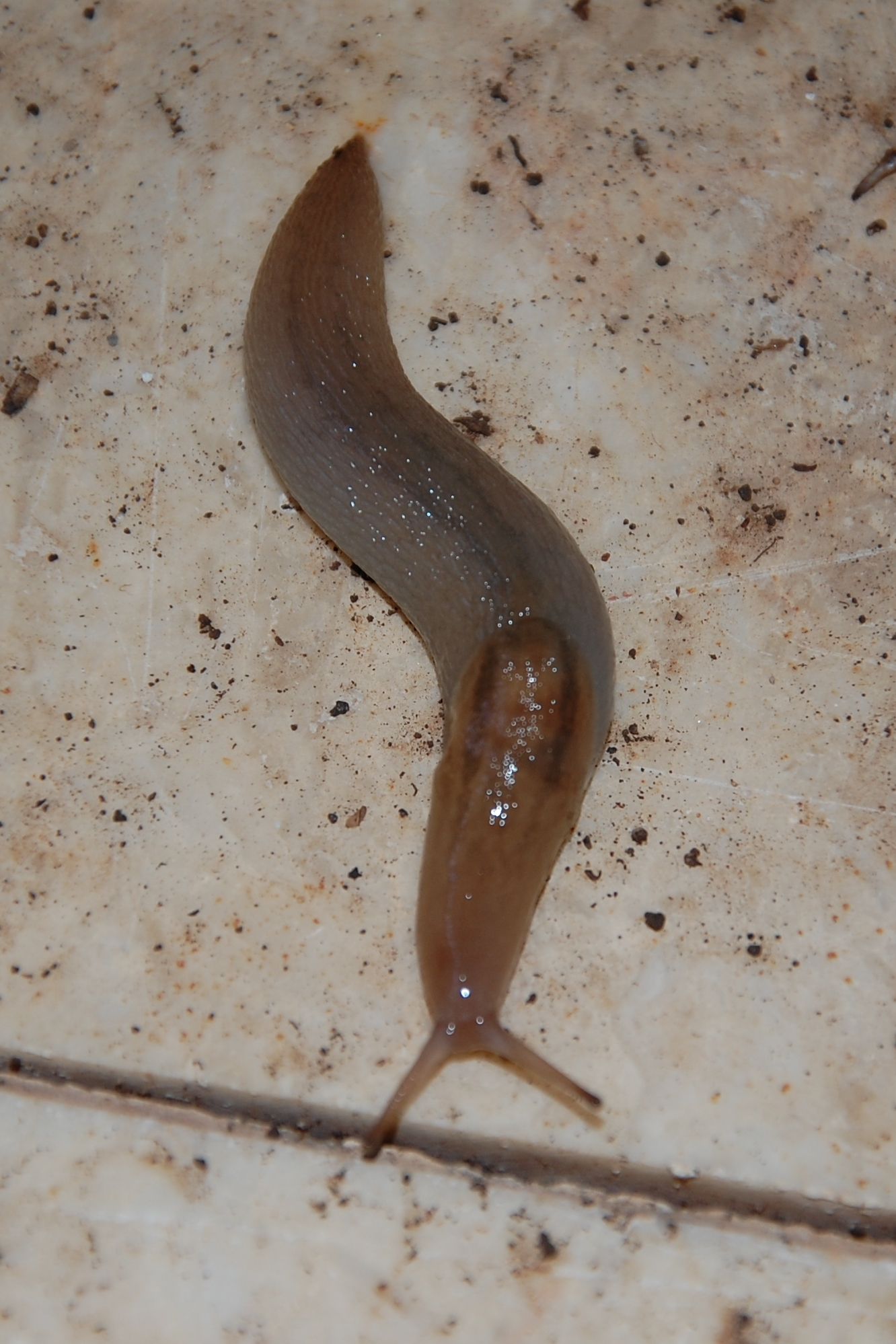
Lehmannia melitensis

Limacidae

- Limacus flavus Linnaeus, 1758
- Lehmannia melitensis (Lessona & Pollonera, 1882)
- Ambigolimax valentianus (Férussac, 1821) – introduced

Agriolimacidae

- Deroceras panormitanum (Lessona & Pollonera, 1882)
- Deroceras golcheri Altena, 1962

Sphincterochilidae

- Sphincterochila candidissima (Draparnaud, 1801)

Hygromiidae

- Cernuella caruanae (Kobelt, 1888) - endemic to Malta and Sicily
- Cernuella cisalpina (Rossmässler, 1837)
- Cernuella virgata (Da Costa, 1778)
- Cochlicella acuta (O. F. Müller, 1774)
- Cochlicella conoidea (Draparnaud, 1801)
- Schileykiella parlatoris (Bivona, 1839)
- Trochoidea calcarata (Benoit, 1860) - endemic
- Trochoidea cucullus (Martens, 1873) - endemic
- Trochoidea despotti (Soós, 1933) - endemic
- Trochoidea ogygiaca (Westerlund, 1889) - endemic
- Trochoidea schembrii (Pfeiffer, 1848) - endemic
- Trochoidea spratti (Pfeiffer, 1846) - endemic
- Xerocrassa gharlapsi (Beckmann, 1987) - endemic
- Xerocrassa meda (Porro, 1840)
- Xerotricha apicina (Lamarck, 1822)
- Xerotricha conspurcata (Draparnaud, 1801)

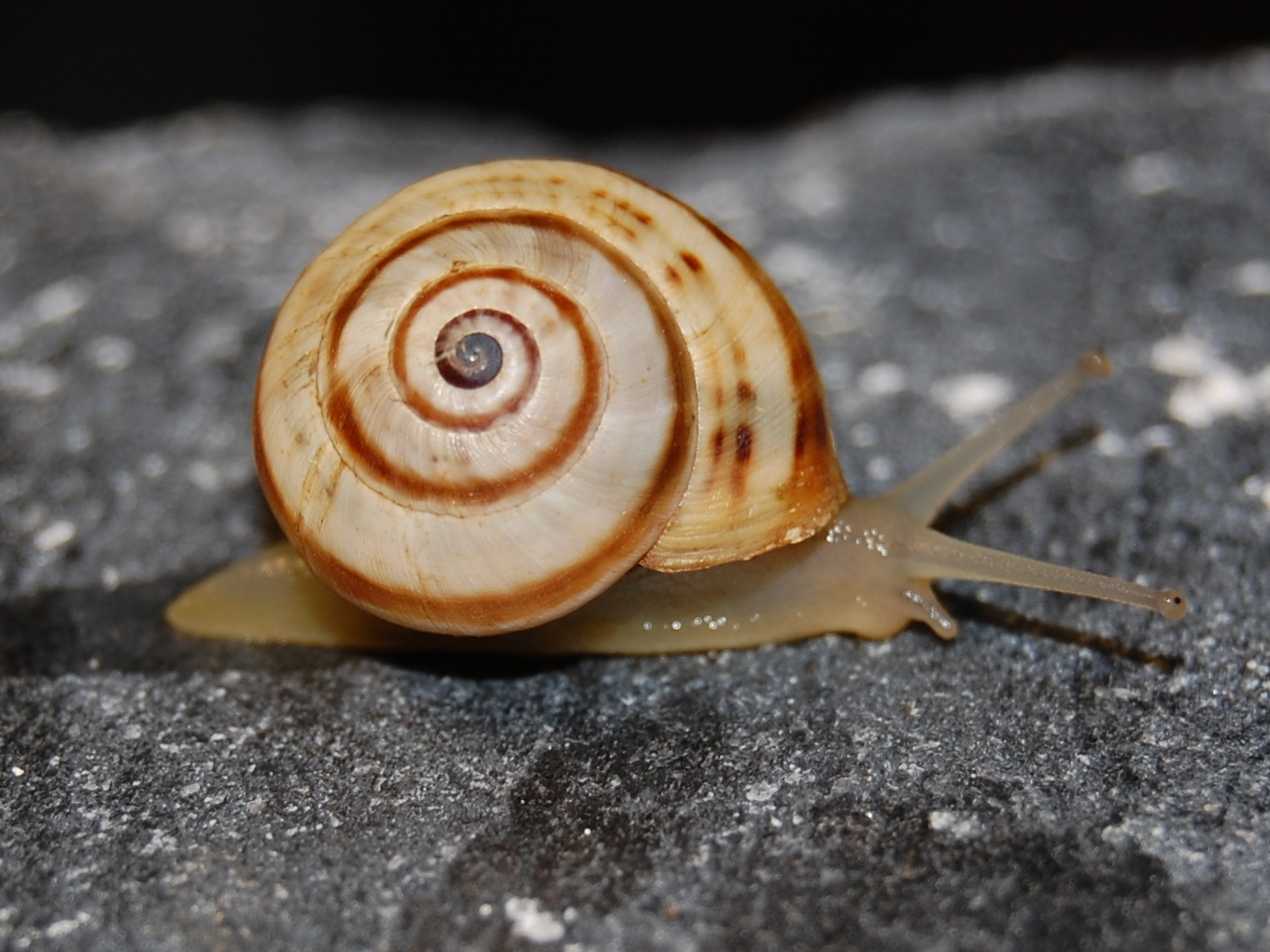
Theba pisana is a widespread species on Malta

Helicidae

- Cantareus aperta (Born, 1778)
- Cornu aspersum (O. F. Müller, 1774)
- Eobania vermiculata (O. F. Müller, 1774)
- Murella globularis (Philippi, 1836)
- Murella melitensis (Férussac, 1821) - endemic
- Theba pisana (O. F. Müller, 1774)

Trissexodontidae

- Caracollina lenticula (Michaud, 1831)

== Freshwater bivalves ==
Freshwater bivalves in Malta include:

Sphaeriidae

- Pisidium casertanum (Poli, 1791)
- Pisidium personatum (Malm, 1855)

== See also ==
Lists of molluscs of surrounding oversea countries:

- List of non-marine molluscs of Italy, Wildlife of Italy
- List of non-marine molluscs of Tunisia, Wildlife of Tunisia
- List of non-marine molluscs of Libya, Wildlife of Libya

The following species have been found only as fossils on Malta:

Fossil freshwater gastropods

- Gyraulus crista (Linnaeus, 1758)
- Bulinus truncatus (Audouin, 1827)

Fossil terrestrial gastropods

- Vertigo antivertigo (Draparnaud, 1801)
- Orculella templorum (Benoit, 1862)
- Siciliaria septemplicata (Philipii, 1836)
- Cernuella durieui (Pfeiffer, 1848)
- Trochoidea caroni (Deshayes, 1830) - fossil endemic to Malta and Sicily
