= List of non-marine molluscs of Tunisia =

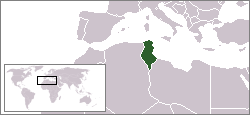
Location of Tunisia

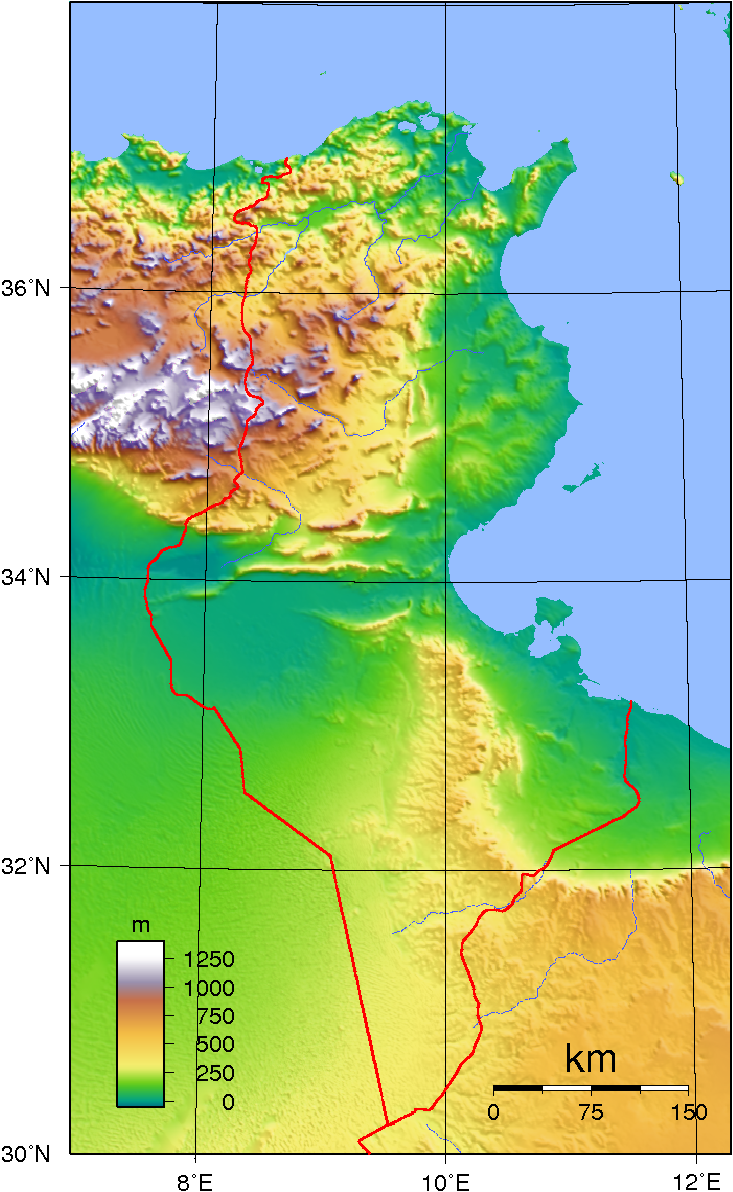
topography of Tunisia

The non-marine molluscs of Tunisia are a part of the molluscan fauna of Tunisia (wildlife of Tunisia).

A number of species of non-marine molluscs are found in the wild in Tunisia.

== Freshwater gastropods ==
Neritidae

- Theodoxus meridionalis (Philippi, 1836)

Hydrobiidae

- Belgrandiella nana (Terver, 1839)
- Belgrandiellopsis chorfensis Khalloufi, Bejaoui & Delicado, 2020 - endemic to Tunisia
- Belgrandiellopsis secunda Khalloufi, Bejaoui & Delicado, 2020 - endemic to Tunisia
- Biserta putealis Khalloufi, Bejaoui & Delicado, 2020 - endemic to Tunisia
- Bullaregia tunisiensis Khalloufi, Bejaoui & Delicado, 2017 - endemic to Tunisia
- Bythinella limnopsis Letourneux & Bourguignat, 1887 - extinct, was endemic to Tunisia
- Bythinella mauritanica Letourneux & Bourguignat 1887 - extinct, was endemic to Tunisia
- Bythinella microcochlia Letourneux & Bourguignat, 1887 - extinct, was endemic to Tunisia
- Bythinella punica Letourneux & Bourguignat, 1887 - extinct, was endemic to Tunisia
- Hydrobia acuta (Draparnaud, 1805)
- Hydrobia djerbaensis Wilke, Pfenninger & Davis, 2002
- Hydrobia musaensis Frauenfeld, 1855
- Hydrobia ventrosa (Montagu, 1803)
- Mercuria bourguignati Glöer, Bouzid et Boeters, 2010
- Mercuria punica (Letourneux & Bourguignat, 1887)
- Mercuria saharica (Letourneux & Bourguignat, 1887)
- Pseudamnicola barratei Letourneux & Bourguignat, 1887 - extinct, was endemic to Tunisia
- Pseudamnicola doumeti Letourneux & Bourguignat, 1887 - extinct, was endemic to Tunisia
- Pseudamnicola globulina Letourneux & Bourguignat, 1887 - extinct, was endemic to Tunisia
- Pseudamnicola latasteana Letourneux & Bourguignat, 1887 - extinct, was endemic to Tunisia
- Pseudamnicola meluzzii Boeters, 1976
- Pseudamnicola oudrefica (Letourneux & Bourguignat, 1887) - extinct, was endemic to Tunisia
- Pseudamnicola ragia Letourneux & Bourguignat, 1887 - extinct, was endemic to Tunisia
- Pseudamnicola singularis Letourneux & Bourguignat, 1887 - extinct, was endemic to Tunisia

Thiaridae

- Melanoides tuberculata (O.F. Müller, 1774)

Melanopsidae

- Melanopsis cariosa Linnaeus, 1767

Cochliopidae

- Heleobia stagnorum (Gmelin, 1791)

Potamididae

- Pirenella conica Blainville, 1829

Assimineidae

- Paludinella globularis (Hanley, 1844)

Lymnaeidae

- Galba truncatula (O.F. Müller, 1774)

Physidae

- Physella acuta (Draparnaud, 1805)

Planorbidae

- Ancylus fluviatilis O.F. Müller, 1774
- Bulinus truncatus (Audouin, 1827)
- Hippeutis complanatus Linnaeus, 1758

== Land gastropods ==
Pleurodiscidae

- Pleurodiscus balmei (Potiez & Michaud, 1838)

Pupillidae

- Pupoides coenopictus (T. Hutton, 1834)

Enidae

- Cirna micelii (Kobelt, 1885)
- Coniconapaeus milevianus (Raymond, 1853)
- Mauronapaeus terverii (Dupotet in Forbes, 1839)
- Mastus pupa (Linnaeus, 1758)

Clausiliidae

- Mauritanica cossoni (Letourneux, 1887) - endemic to Tunisia
- Mauritanica perinni Bourguignat, 1876
  - Mauritanica perinni polygyra (O. Boettger, 1879) - endemic to Tunisia
  - Mauritanica perinni zaghouanica Sparacio, Liberto & La Mantia, 2020 - endemic to Tunisia
- Mauritanica philora (Letourneux, 1887) - endemic to Tunisia
  - Mauritanica philora philora (Letourneux, 1887) - endemic to Tunisia
  - Mauritanica philora bognannii Sparacio, Liberto & La Mantia, 2020 - endemic to Tunisia
- Mauritanica tristrami (Pfeiffer, 1861) - endemic to Tunisia
  - Mauritanica tristrami tristrami (Pfeiffer, 1861) - endemic to Tunisia
  - Mauritanica tristrami nouirasaidi Sparacio, Liberto & La Mantia, 2020 - endemic to Tunisia
  - Mauritanica tristrami zribensis Sparacio, Liberto & La Mantia, 2020 - endemic to Tunisia
- Papillifera papillaris (O.F. Müller, 1778)

Achatinidae

- Rumina decollata (Linnaeus, 1758)[53]

Milacidae

- Milax gagates (Bourguignat 1801)
- Milax gasulli Altena 1974 - endemic to Tunisia
- Milax nigricans (Philippi 1836)

Limacidae

- Limacus flavus (Linnaeus 1758)
- Lehmannia melitensis (Lessona and Pollonera 1882)

Geomitridae

- Cernuella virgata (Da Costa, 1778)
- Cochlicella barbara (Linnaeus, 1758)
- Trochoidea elegans (Gmelin, 1791)
- Trochoidea pyramidata (Draparnaud, 1805)
- Xerocrassa latastei (Letourneux in Letourneux & Bourguignat, 1887) - endemic to Tunisia
- Xerocrassa latasteopsis (Letourneux & Bourguignat, 1887) - endemic to Tunisia
- Xeroplana doumeti (Bouguignat, 1876) - endemic to Tunisia
- Xeroplana idia (Issel, 1885) - endemic to Tunisia

Helicidae

- Cornu aspersum (O.F. Müller, 1778)
- Eobania vermiculata (O.F. Müller, 1778)
- Eremina desertorum irregularis (Férussac, 1821)
- Helix melanostoma Draparnaud, 1801
- Helix pronuba Westerlund & Blanc, 1879
- Marmorana muralis (O. F. Müller, 1774)
- Theba pisana (O.F. Müller, 1778)

Sphincterochilidae

- Sphincterochila candidissima (Draparnaud, 1801)
- Sphincterochila tunetana (L. Pfeiffer, 1850) - endemic to Tunisia

Trissexodontidae

- Caracollina lenticula (Férussac, 1821)

== Freshwater bivalves ==
Unionidae

- Anodonta lucasi Deshayes, 1847
- Potomida littoralis (Cuvier, 1798)
- Unio durieui Deshayes, 1847
- Unio gibbus Spengler, 1793
- Unio ravoisieri Deshayes, 1848

Sphaeriidae

- Pisidium casertanum (Poli, 1791)

== See also ==
Lists of molluscs of surrounding countries:

- List of non-marine molluscs of Libya, Wildlife of Libya
- List of non-marine molluscs of Algeria, Wildlife of Algeria

oversea countries:

- List of non-marine molluscs of Italy, Wildlife of Italy
- List of non-marine molluscs of Malta, Wildlife of Malta
