= Trochoidea =

Trochoidea may refer to:

- Trochoidea (genus), a genus of land snails
- Trochoidea (superfamily), a superfamily of marine snails
