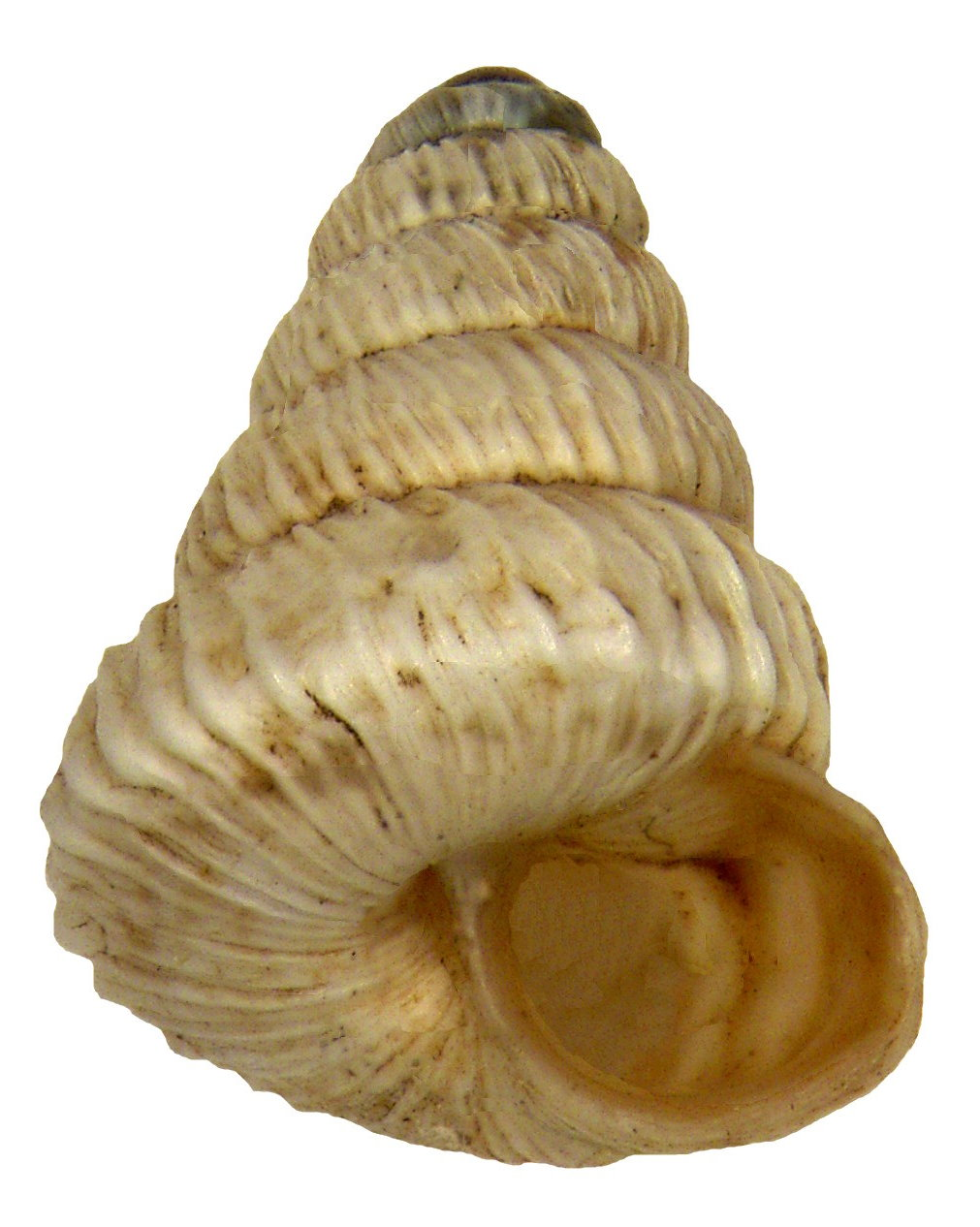

Conservation status
- Near Threatened (IUCN 3.1)

Scientific classification
- Kingdom: Animalia
- Phylum: Mollusca
- Class: Gastropoda
- Order: Stylommatophora
- Family: Geomitridae
- Genus: Trochoidea
- Species: T. liebetruti

Binomial name
- Trochoidea liebetruti Albers, 1852

Synonyms
- Helix liebetruti Albers, 1852 (original combination); Trochoidea (Trochoidea) liebetruti (Albers, 1852) · alternate representation

= Trochoidea liebetruti =

Species of gastropod

Trochoidea liebetruti is a species of air-breathing land snail, a terrestrial pulmonate gastropod mollusc in the family Geomitridae, the hairy snails and their allies.

== Distribution ==
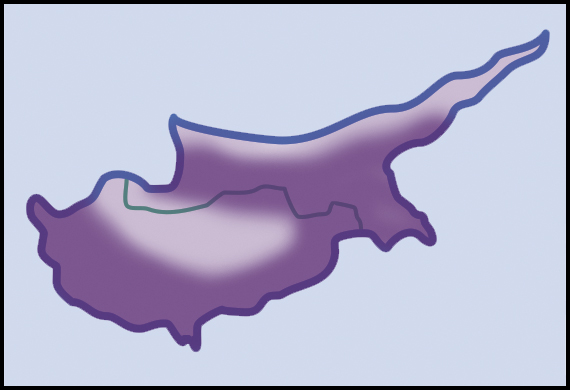
Distribution

This species is endemic to Cyprus.
