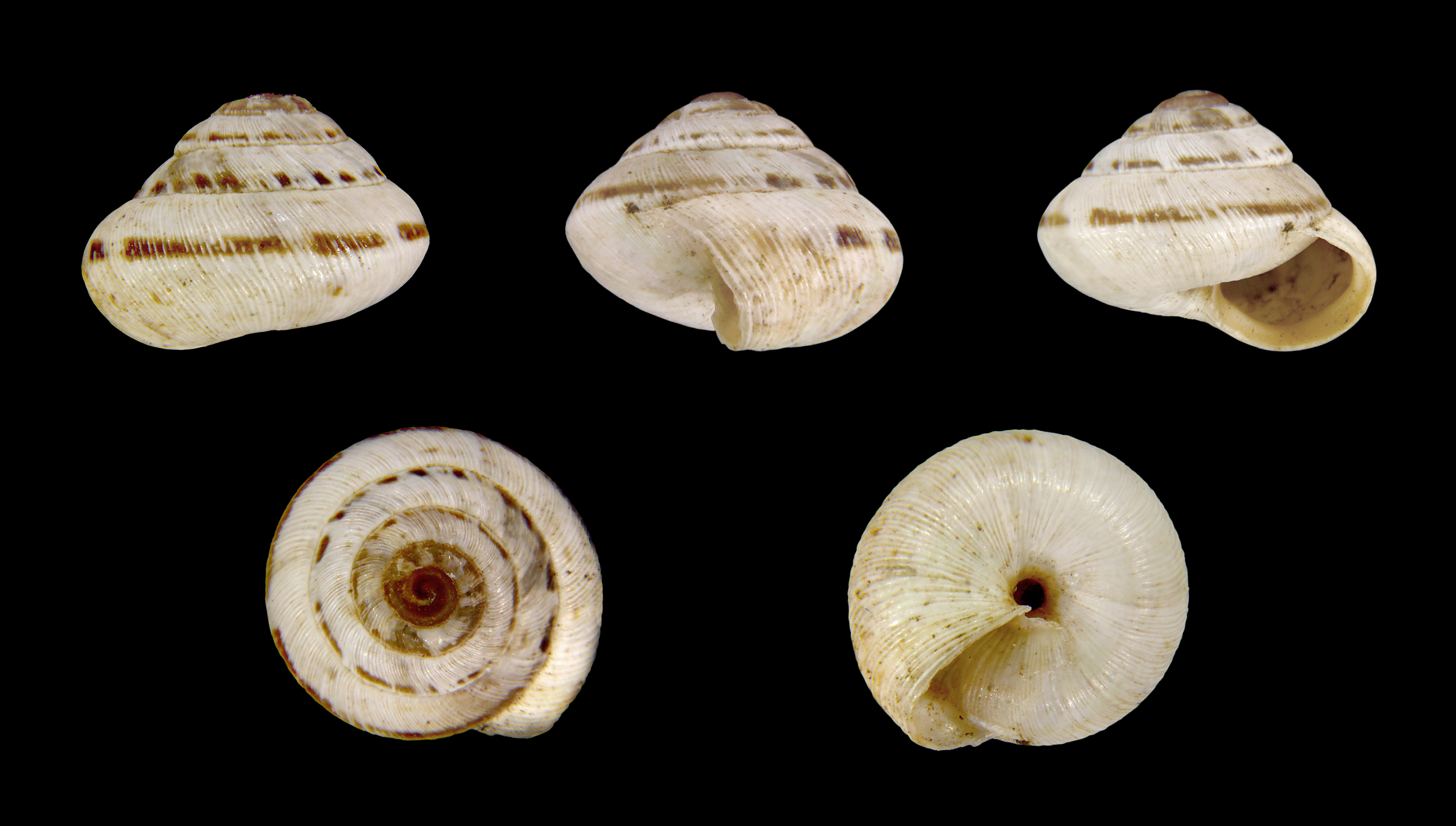
- Five views of a shell of Trochoidea pyramidata (Draparnaud, 1805)

Scientific classification
- Kingdom: Animalia
- Phylum: Mollusca
- Class: Gastropoda
- Order: Stylommatophora
- Infraorder: Helicoidei
- Superfamily: Helicoidea
- Family: Geomitridae
- Genus: Trochoidea; Brown, 1827

Type species
- Helix elegans Gmelin, 1791

Synonyms
- Helix (Ochthephila) Beck, 1837 (junior synonym); Helix (Turricula) Beck, 1837 (Invalid: junior homonym of...); Ochthephila H. Beck, 1837; Trochoidea (Trochoidea) T. Brown, 1827 · alternate representation; Trochula Schlüter, 1838; Tropidocochlis Locard, 1893; Turricula H. Beck, 1837 · (Invalid: junior homonym of Turricula Schumacher, 1817 [Turridae]); Xeroclivia Monterosato, 1892; Xerocochlea Monterosato, 1892; Xeronexa Monterosato, 1892 ·; Xerophila (Trochula) Schlüter, 1838 · (superseded generic combination)

= Trochoidea (genus) =

Genus of gastropods

Trochoidea is a genus of air-breathing land snails, terrestrial pulmonate gastropod mollusks in the subfamily Helicellinae of the family Geomitridae. The name means "those that are shaped like a top".

== Species ==
Species within the genus Trochoidea include:

- Trochoidea caroni (Deshayes, 1830)
- Trochoidea cucullus (Martens, 1873)
- Trochoidea cumiae (Calcara, 1847)
- Trochoidea elata (A.E.J. Férussac, 1819) (synonym: Helix elata Férussac, 1819)
- Trochoidea elegans (Gmelin, 1791)
- Trochoidea liebetruti (Albers, 1852)
- Trochoidea pumilio (Dillwyn, 1817)
- Trochoidea pyramidata (Draparnaud, 1805)
- Trochoidea schembrii Pfeiffer, 1848
- Trochoidea spratti (Pfeiffer, 1846)
- Trochoidea tarentina (Pfeiffer, 1848)
- Trochoidea trochoides (Poiret, 1789)

The following species have been brought into synonymy:

- Trochoidea amanda (Rossmässler, 1838): synonym of Cernuella amanda E.A. Rossmässler, 1838
- Trochoidea betulonensis : synonym of Xerocrassa montserratensis ssp. betulonensis
- Trochoidea carinatoglobosa (Haas, 1934): synonym of Xerocrassa carinatoglobosa (F. Haas, 1934)
- Trochoidea claudinae : synonym of Xerocrassa claudinae
- Trochoidea davidiana (Bourguignat, 1863): synonym of Xerocrassa davidiana (Bourguignat, 1863) (superseded combination)
- Trochoidea conica J.P.R. Draparnaud, 1801: synonym of Trochoidea trochoides (Poiret, 1789)
- Trochoidea crenulata J. Germain, 1930: synonym of Trochoidea trochoides (Poiret, 1789)
- Trochoidea geyeri : synonym of Xerocrassa geyeri (Soós, 1926)
- Trochoidea gharlapsi : synonym of Xerocrassa gharlapsi
- Trochoidea infulata M. Paulucci, 1882: synonym of Trochoidea trochoides (Poiret, 1789)
- Trochoidea jimenensis : synonym of Xerocrassa jimenensis
- † Trochoidea miocaenica Gottschick & Wenz, 1927: synonym of † Miodiscula miocaenica (Gottschick & Wenz, 1927) (new combination)
- Trochoidea molinae : synonym of Xerocrassa molinae
- Trochoidea montserratensis : synonym of Xerocrassa montserratensis
- Trochoidea penchinati (Bourguignat, 1868): synonym of Xerocrassa penchinati (Bourguignat, 1868) (superseded combination)
- Trochoidea numidica Moquin-Tandon, 1847: synonym of Trochoidea pyramidata (Draparnaud, 1805)
- Trochoidea picardi Haas, 1933: synonym of Xerocrassa picardi Haas, 1933
- Trochoidea rhabdota (Sturany, 1901): synonym of Xerocrassa rhabdota (R. Sturany, 1901)
- Trochoidea pseudojacosta Forcart, 1976: synonym of Xerocrassa pseudojacosta (Forcart, 1976) (original combination)
- Trochoidea rugosa A. Aradas & G. Maggiore, 1839: synonym of Trochoidea trochoides (Poiret, 1789)
- Trochoidea rugosula R.A. Philippi, 1844: synonym of Trochoidea trochoides (Poiret, 1789)
- Trochoidea saintsimoni E. Caziot, 1903: synonym of Trochoidea trochoides (Poiret, 1789)
- Trochoidea seetzenii : synonym of Xerocrassa seetzeni
- Trochoidea scitula G.J. De Cristofori & G. Jan 1832: synonym of Trochoidea elegans (J.F. Gmelin, 1791)
- Trochoidea simulata(C.G. Ehrenberg, 1831): synonym of Xerocrassa simulata (C.G. Ehrenberg, 1831)
- Trochoidea solarium A. Risso, 1826: synonym of Trochoidea elegans (J.F. Gmelin, 1791)
- Trochoidea terrestris E. Donovan, 1801: synonym of Trochoidea elegans (J.F. Gmelin, 1791)
- Trochoidea trochillus J.L.M. Poiret, 1789: synonym of Trochoidea elegans (J.F. Gmelin, 1791)
- Trochoidea trochlea L. Pfeiffer, 1846: synonym of Trochoidea elegans (J.F. Gmelin, 1791)
- Trochoidea zaharensis : synonym of Xerocrassa zaharensis (Puente & Arrébola, 1996)
