= Tyrrheniellina =

Scientific classification
- Kingdom: Animalia
- Phylum: Mollusca
- Class: Gastropoda
- Order: Stylommatophora
- Family: Canariellidae
- Genus: Tyrrheniellina (Giusti & Manganelli, 1989)

Genus of gastropods

Tyrrheniellina is a genus of land snails, terrestrial pulmonate gastropod molluscs in the family Canariellidae.

== Species ==
Species in the genus Tyrrheniellina include:

- Tyrrheniellina josephi
