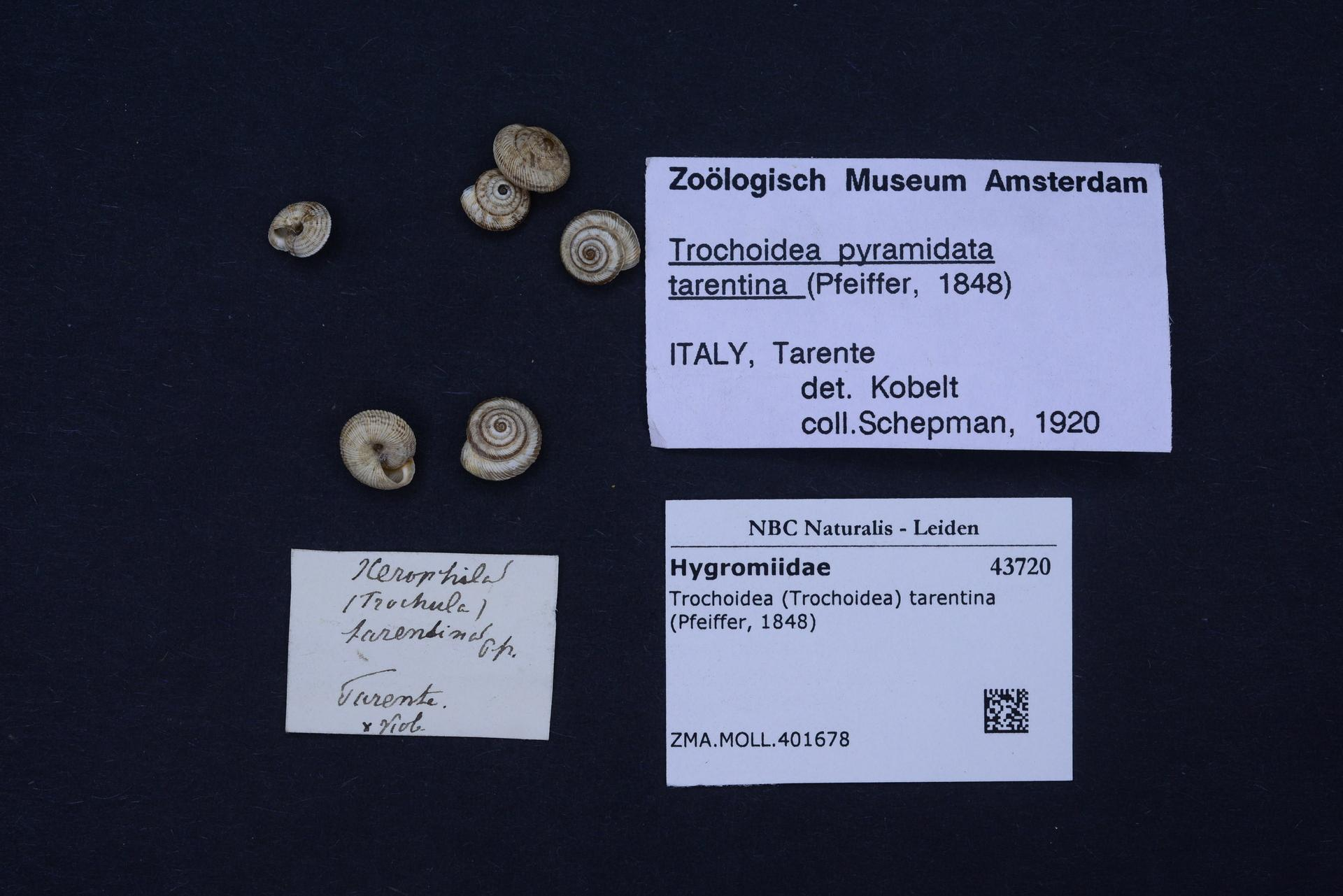

Conservation status
- Data Deficient (IUCN 3.1)

Scientific classification
- Kingdom: Animalia
- Phylum: Mollusca
- Class: Gastropoda
- Order: Stylommatophora
- Family: Geomitridae
- Genus: Trochoidea
- Species: T. tarentina

Binomial name
- Trochoidea tarentina (Pfeiffer, 1848)

Synonyms
- Helix pyramidata var. costulata Rossmässler, 1842 (junior synonym); Helix tarentina L. Pfeiffer, 1848 (original combination); Trochoidea (Trochoidea) tarentina (L. Pfeiffer, 1848) · alternate representation

= Trochoidea tarentina =

Species of gastropod

Trochoidea tarentina is a species of air-breathing land snail, a terrestrial pulmonate gastropod mollusc in the family Geomitridae, the hairy snails and their allies.

== Distribution ==
This species is endemic to Italy.
