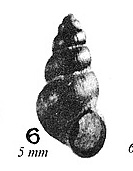
- Shell of Mercuria similis

Conservation status
- Least Concern (IUCN 3.1)

Scientific classification
- Kingdom: Animalia
- Phylum: Mollusca
- Class: Gastropoda
- Subclass: Caenogastropoda
- Order: Littorinimorpha
- Family: Hydrobiidae
- Genus: Mercuria
- Species: M. similis

Binomial name
- Mercuria similis (Draparnaud, 1805)

Synonyms
- Amnicola confusa Frauenfeld, 1863; Cyclostoma simile Draparnaud, 1805; Mercuria confusa (Frauenfeld, 1863); Pseudamnicola confusa (Frauenfeld, 1863); Pseudamnicola similis (Draparnaud, 1805)

= Mercuria similis =

Species of gastropod

Mercuria similis is a species of small freshwater snail with an operculum, an aquatic gastropod mollusk in the family Hydrobiidae.

This species only tolerates very low salinities, and is perhaps better characterized as a freshwater snail.

== Description ==
The 3–4 mm. high shell is fragile and translucent yellow-white in colour (but often coated with dark deposits). The animal is entirely and uniformly pale and has pale tentacles. Mercuria similis has a proportionately larger body whorl than other hydrobiids.

The shell is short-conical and 3.90–4.50 mm high (Vic-la-Gardiole, Hérault), with a large oval aperture. The penis is long and slim, acute at its distal end, the penial appendix is broad and shorter than the penis which lies on the appendix.

== Geographic distribution ==
- This species is native to France, Italy, Malta, Algeria, Tunisia and Morocco.
- Great Britain
- Ireland
- Netherlands
