= Tyrrheniellina josephi =

Conservation status
- Vulnerable (IUCN 2.3)

Scientific classification
- Kingdom: Animalia
- Phylum: Mollusca
- Class: Gastropoda
- Order: Stylommatophora
- Family: Canariellidae
- Genus: Tyrrheniellina
- Species: T. josephi

Binomial name
- Tyrrheniellina josephi (Giusti & Manganelli, 1989)

Species of gastropod

Tyrrheniellina josephi is a species of land snail, a terrestrial pulmonate gastropod mollusc in the family Canariellidae, the hairy snails and their allies. This species is endemic to Italy.
