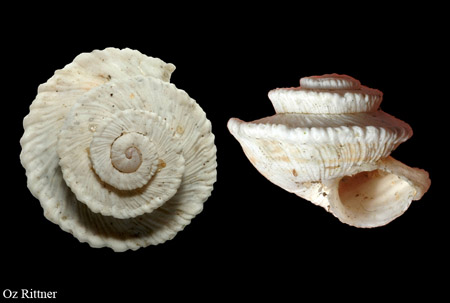
- Xerocrassa picardi shells

Conservation status
- Extinct (IUCN 2.3)

Scientific classification
- Kingdom: Animalia
- Phylum: Mollusca
- Class: Gastropoda
- Order: Stylommatophora
- Family: Geomitridae
- Genus: Trochoidea
- Species: †T. picardi

Binomial name
- †Trochoidea picardi (F. Haas, 1933)

Synonyms
- Helicella (Jacosta) lederi picardi Haas, 1933 (basionym); Trochoidea picardi Haas, 1933; Xerocrassa (Xerocrassa) picardi (F. Haas, 1933) · alternate representation; Xerocrassa davidiana picardi (F. Haas, 1933)

= Xerocrassa picardi =

Species of gastropod

Xerocrassa picardi was a species of air-breathing land snail, a terrestrial pulmonate gastropod mollusk in the family Geomitridae.

This species was endemic to Israel.

== Conservation status ==
In the 1996 IUCN Red list, the species was listed as extinct or locally extinct.

According to the Mienis (2003), in 2003 the species was at the edge of extinction.
