= Cochlostoma canestrinii =

Conservation status
- Vulnerable (IUCN 3.1)

Scientific classification
- Kingdom: Animalia
- Phylum: Mollusca
- Class: Gastropoda
- Subclass: Caenogastropoda
- Order: Architaenioglossa
- Superfamily: Cyclophoroidea
- Family: Cochlostomatidae
- Genus: Cochlostoma
- Species: C. canestrinii

Binomial name
- Cochlostoma canestrinii (Adami, 1876)

Species of gastropod

Cochlostoma canestrinii is a species of small land snail with an operculum, a terrestrial gastropod mollusk in the family Cochlostomatidae.

== Distribution and habitat ==
This species is endemic to Italy. It lives in rocky limestone areas.
