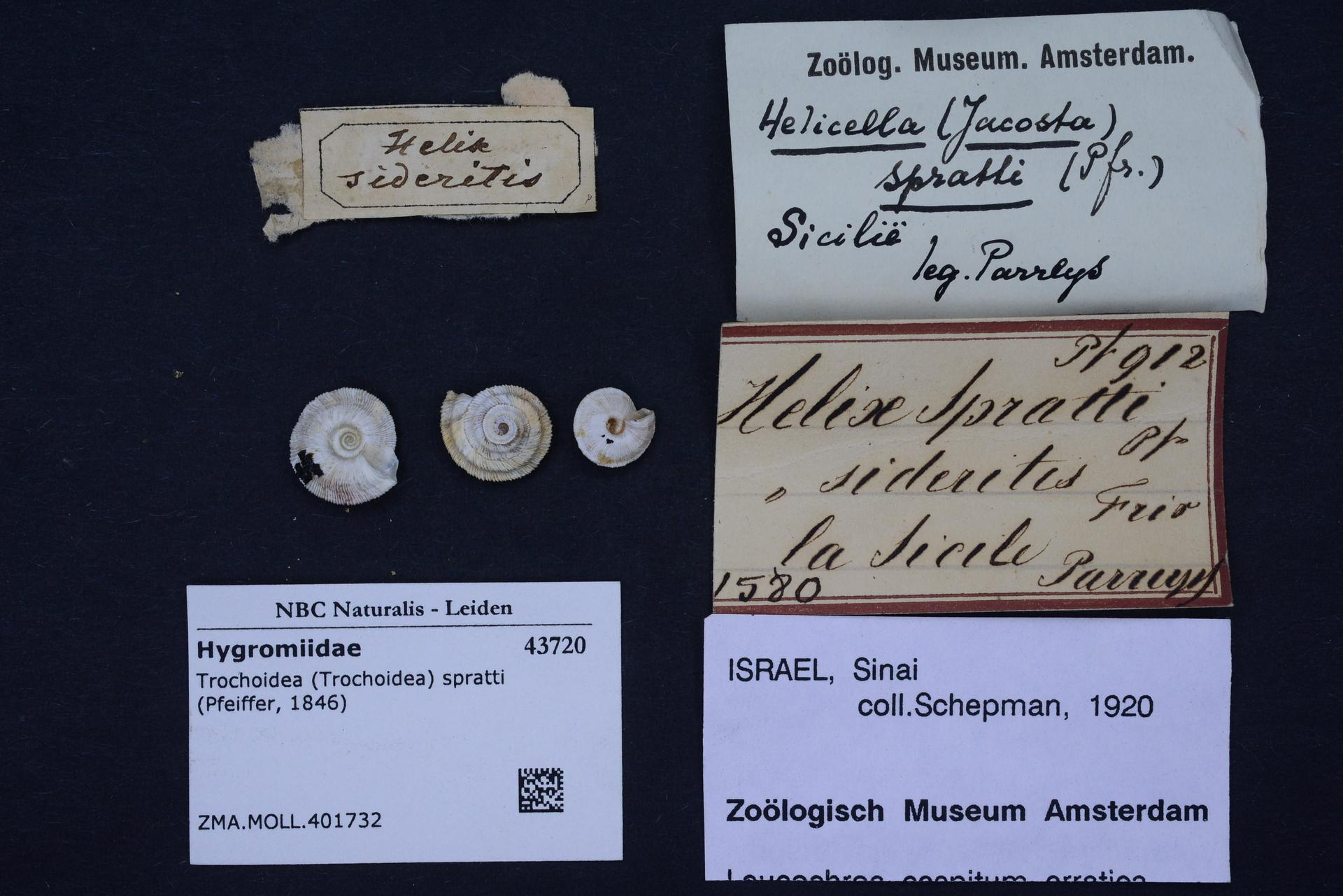
- Shell of Trochoidea spratti (specimen at Naturalis Biodiversity Center)

Scientific classification
- Kingdom: Animalia
- Phylum: Mollusca
- Class: Gastropoda
- Order: Stylommatophora
- Family: Geomitridae
- Genus: Trochoidea
- Species: T. spratti

Binomial name
- Trochoidea spratti Pfeiffer, 1846

Synonyms
- Helix calcarata Benoit, 1862 (junior synonym); Helix schombrii L. Pfeiffer, 1848 (junior synonym); Helix spratti L. Pfeiffer, 1846 (original combination); Trochoidea (Trochoidea) spratti (L. Pfeiffer, 1846) · alternate representation

= Trochoidea spratti =

Species of gastropod

Trochoidea spratti is a species of air-breathing land snail, a terrestrial pulmonate gastropod mollusk in the family Geomitridae, the hairy snails and their allies.

Subspecies

- Trochoidea spratti calcarata (Benoit, 1860)
- Trochoidea spratti spratti (L. Pfeiffer, 1846)

== Distribution ==
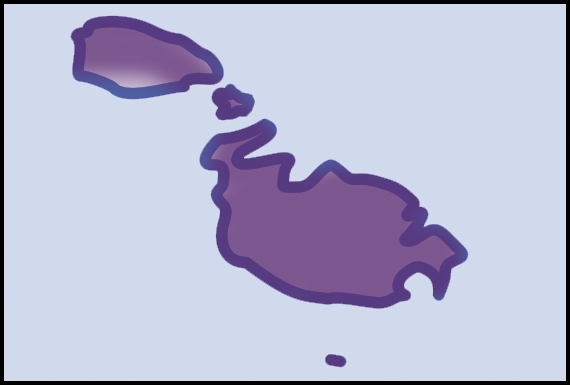
Distribution

This species is endemic to Malta.
