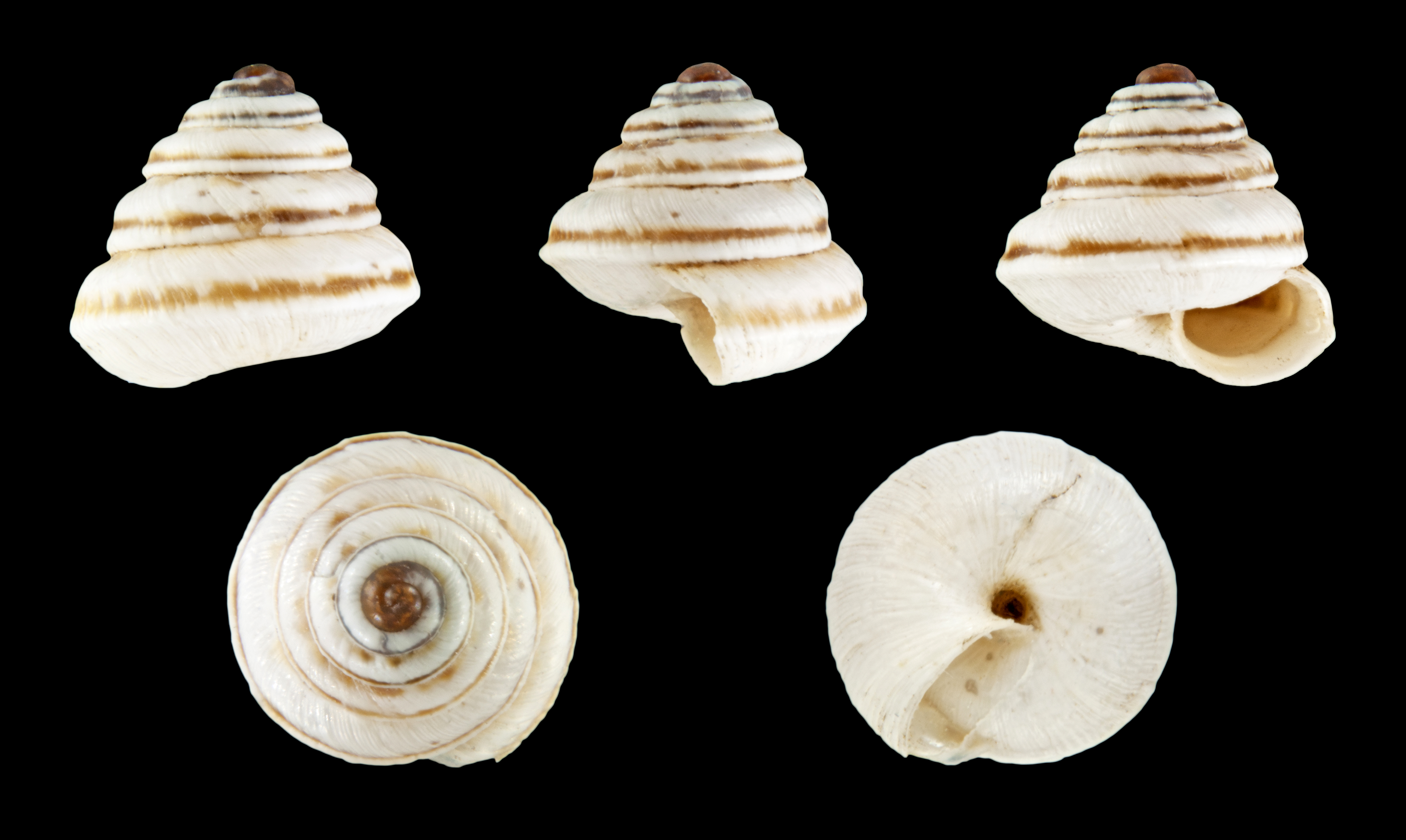

Scientific classification
- Domain: Eukaryota
- Kingdom: Animalia
- Phylum: Mollusca
- Class: Gastropoda
- Order: Stylommatophora
- Family: Geomitridae
- Genus: Trochoidea
- Species: T. trochoides

Binomial name
- Trochoidea trochoides Poiret, 1789

Synonyms
- Trochoidea (Trochoidea) trochoides (Poiret, 1789) · alternate representation; Trochoidea conica J.P.R. Draparnaud, 1801; Trochoidea crenulata J. Germain, 1930; Trochoidea infulata M. Paulucci, 1882; Trochoidea rugosa A. Aradas & G. Maggiore, 1839; Trochoidea rugosula R.A. Philippi, 1844; Trochoidea saintsimoni E. Caziot, 1903

= Trochoidea trochoides =

Species of gastropod

Trochoidea trochoides is a species of air-breathing land snail, a terrestrial pulmonate gastropod mollusk in the family Geomitridae, the hairy snails and their allies.

== Distribution ==
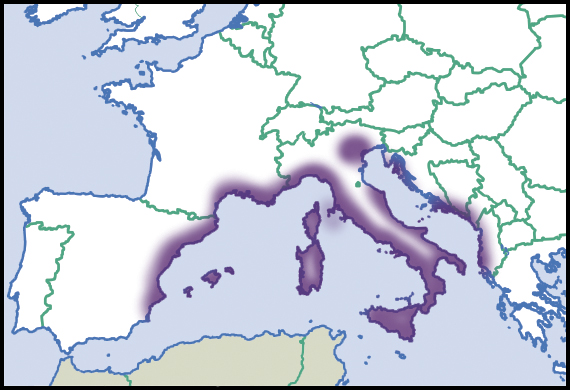
Distribution

This species occurs around the Mediterranean Sea.
