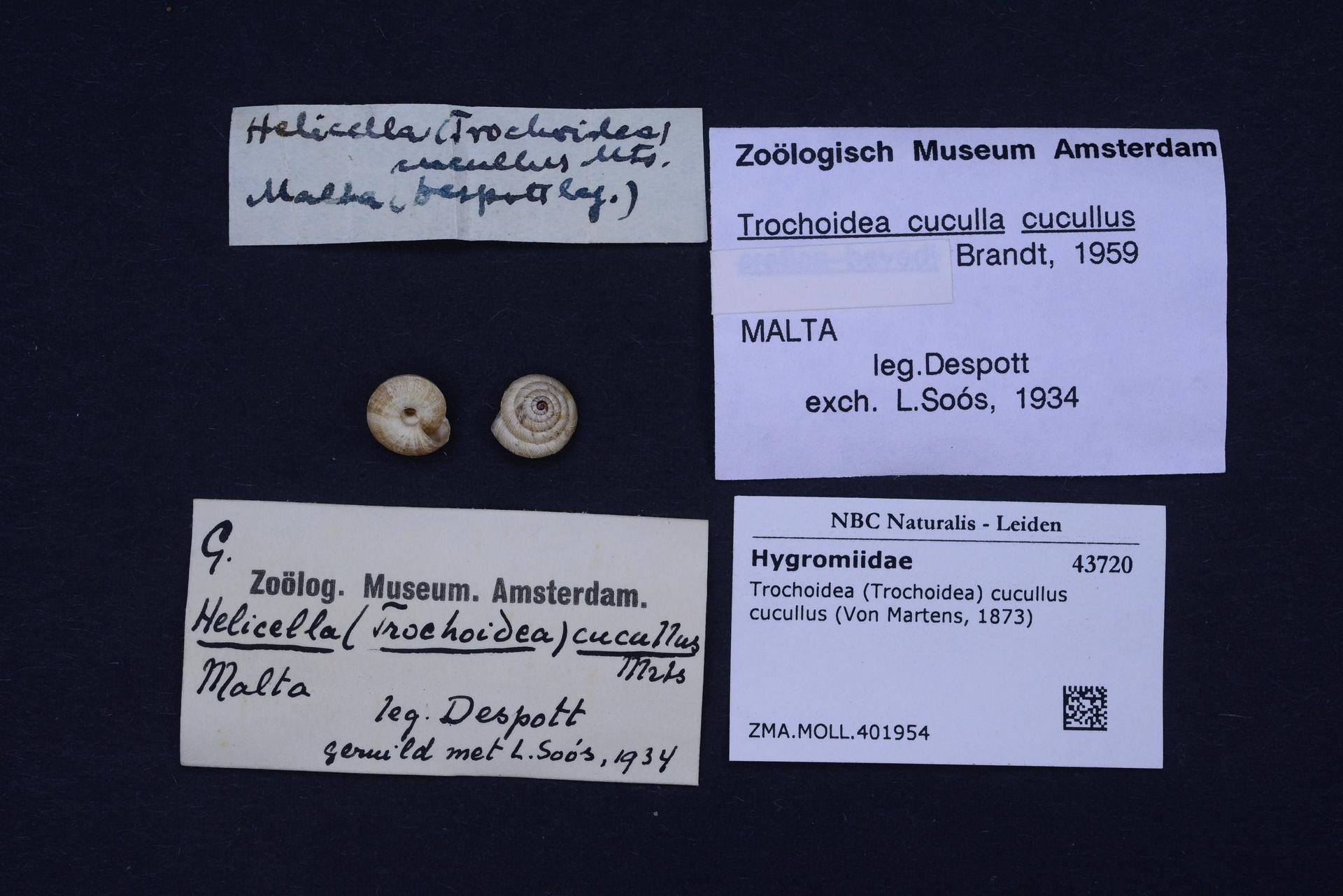

Scientific classification
- Kingdom: Animalia
- Phylum: Mollusca
- Class: Gastropoda
- Order: Stylommatophora
- Family: Geomitridae
- Genus: Trochoidea
- Species: T. cucullus

Binomial name
- Trochoidea cucullus Martens, 1873

Synonyms
- Trochoidea (Trochoidea) cucullus (E. von Martens, 1875) · alternate representation

= Trochoidea cucullus =

Species of gastropod

Trochoidea cucullus is a species of air-breathing land snail, a terrestrial pulmonate gastropod mollusk in the family Geomitridae, the hairy snails and their allies.

Subspecies

- Trochoidea cucullus cucullus (E. von Martens, 1875)
- Trochoidea cucullus despotti (Soós, 1933)
- Trochoidea cucullus soosi Beckmann, 2003

== Distribution ==
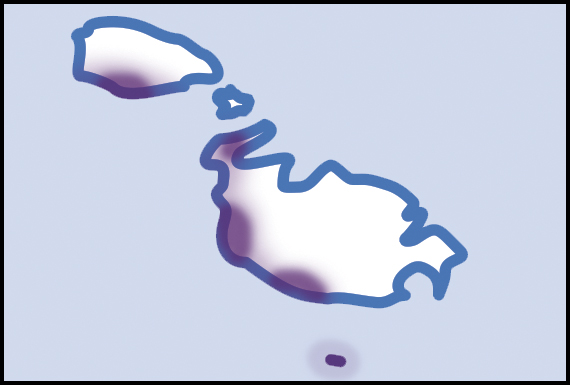
Distribution

This species occurs on Malta.
