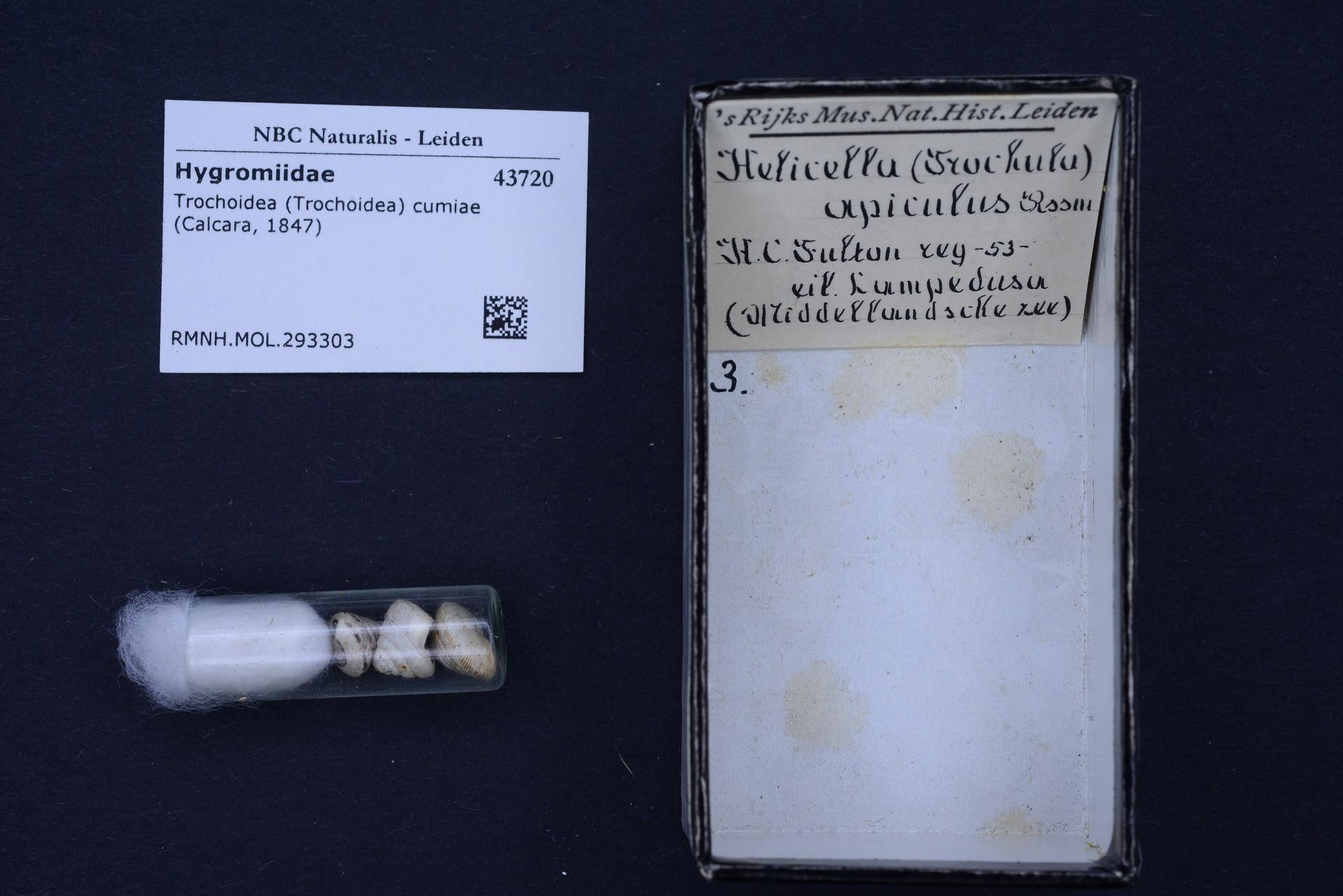

Conservation status
- Near Threatened (IUCN 3.1)

Scientific classification
- Kingdom: Animalia
- Phylum: Mollusca
- Class: Gastropoda
- Order: Stylommatophora
- Family: Geomitridae
- Genus: Trochoidea
- Species: T. cumiae

Binomial name
- Trochoidea cumiae (Calcara, 1847)

Synonyms
- Helix apiculus L. Pfeiffer, 1849 (junior synonym); Helix cumiae Calcara, 1847 (original combination); Trochoidea (Trochoidea) cumiae (Calcara, 1847) · alternate representation

= Trochoidea cumiae =

Species of gastropod

Trochoidea cumiae is a species of air-breathing land snail, a terrestrial pulmonate gastropod mollusk in the family Geomitridae, the hairy snails and their allies.

== Distribution ==
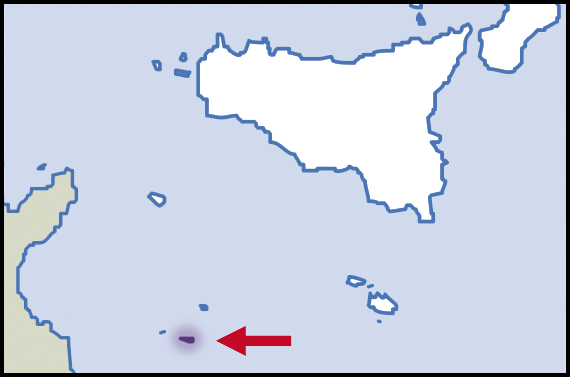
Distribution

This species is endemic to Lampedusa, Italy.

== Note ==
- Calcara, P. (1847). Descrizione dell'isola di Lampedusa, 1-45. Palermo. (Pagano).
- Bank, R. A.; Neubert, E. (2017). Checklist of the land and freshwater Gastropoda of Europe. Last update: 16 July 2017.
