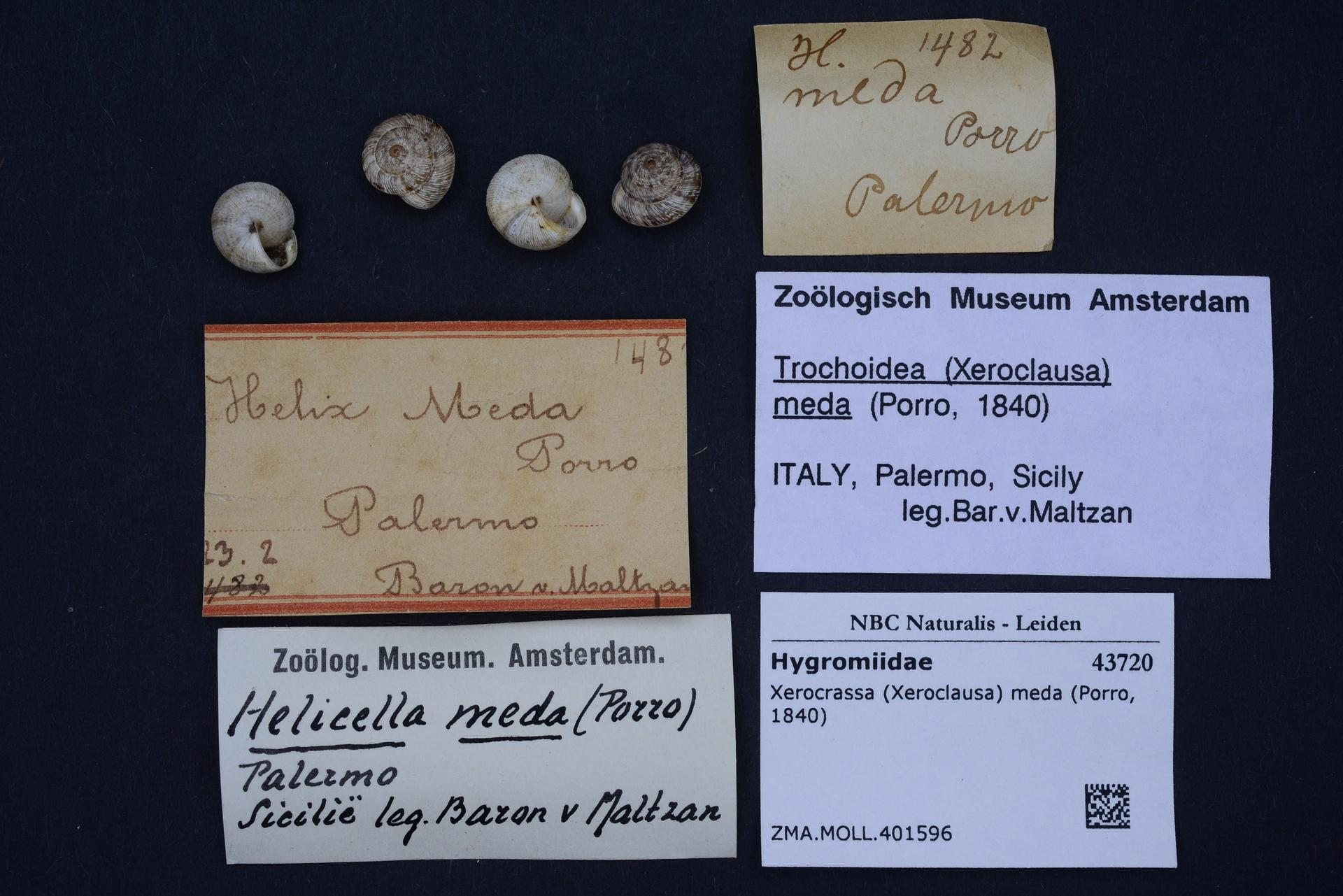
- Shell of Xerocrassa meda (specimen at Naturalis Biodiversity Center)

Conservation status
- Least Concern (IUCN 3.1)

Scientific classification
- Kingdom: Animalia
- Phylum: Mollusca
- Class: Gastropoda
- Order: Stylommatophora
- Family: Geomitridae
- Genus: Xerocrassa
- Species: X. meda

Binomial name
- Xerocrassa meda (Porro, 1840)

Synonyms
- Helix meda Porro, 1840 (original name); Xerocrassa (Xeroclausa) meda (Porro, 1840) · alternate representation

= Xerocrassa meda =

Species of gastropod

Xerocrassa meda is a species of air-breathing land snail, a pulmonate gastropod mollusk in the family Geomitridae.

== Distribution ==
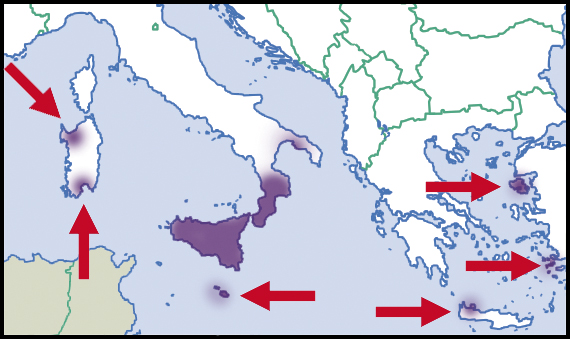
Distribution

This species is native to Greece, Italy and Malta.
