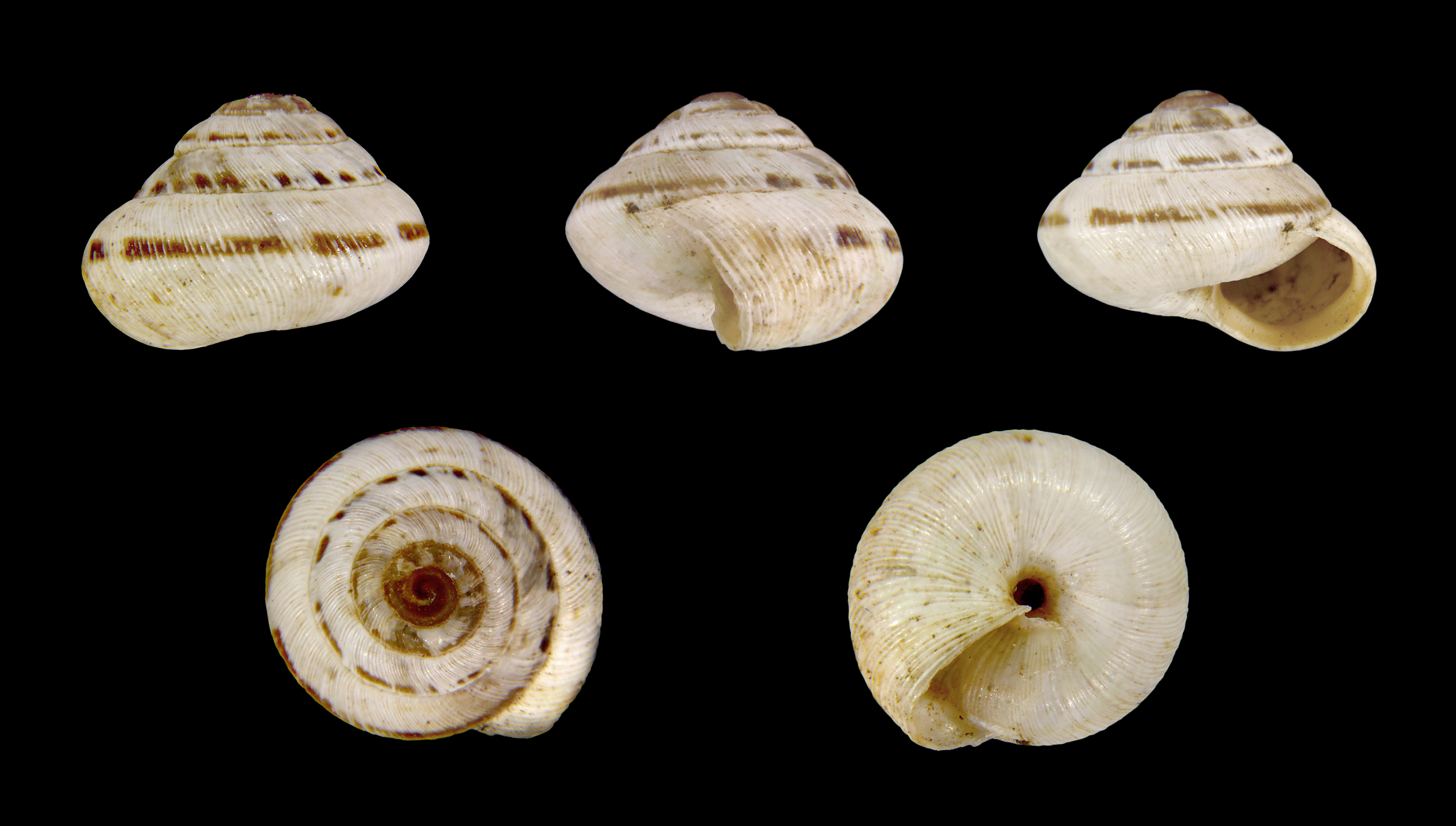
- Five views of a shell of Trochoidea pyramidata
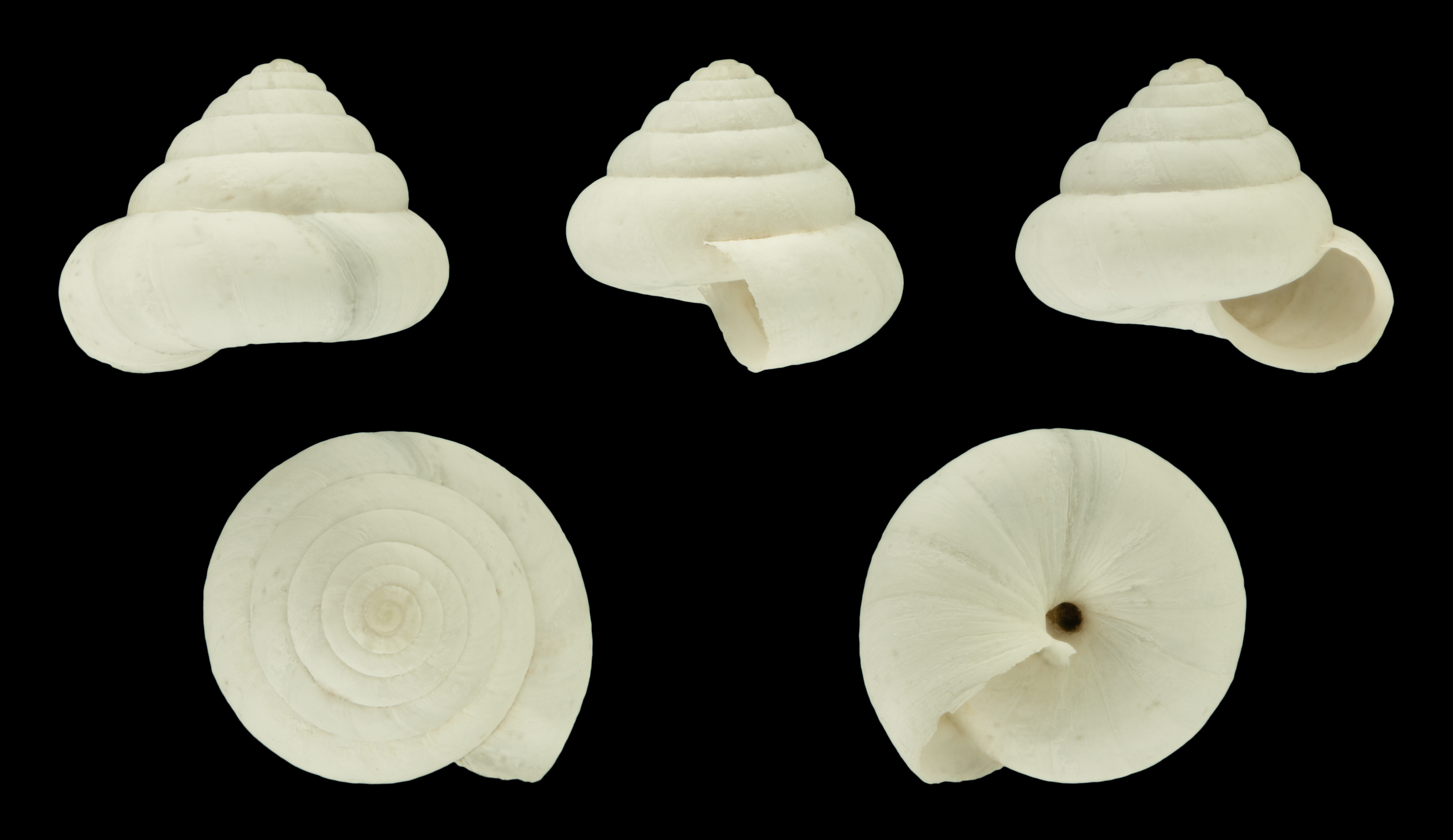

Conservation status
- Least Concern (IUCN 3.1)

Scientific classification
- Kingdom: Animalia
- Phylum: Mollusca
- Class: Gastropoda
- Order: Stylommatophora
- Family: Geomitridae
- Genus: Trochoidea
- Species: T. pyramidata

Binomial name
- Trochoidea pyramidata (Draparnaud, 1805)

Synonyms
- Helix (Xerophila) pyramidata Draparnaud, 1805 (superseded combination); Helix pyramidata Draparnaud, 1805 (original combination); Helix pyramidata var. maxima Walderdorff, 1864 (invalid; preoccupied); Helix pyramidata var. requieni Mousson, 1859 (junior synonym); Trochoidea (Trochoidea) pyramidata (Draparnaud, 1805) · alternate representation

= Trochoidea pyramidata =

Species of gastropod

Trochoidea pyramidata is a species of air-breathing land snail, a terrestrial pulmonate gastropod mollusk in the family Geomitridae, the hairy snails and their allies.

== Distribution ==
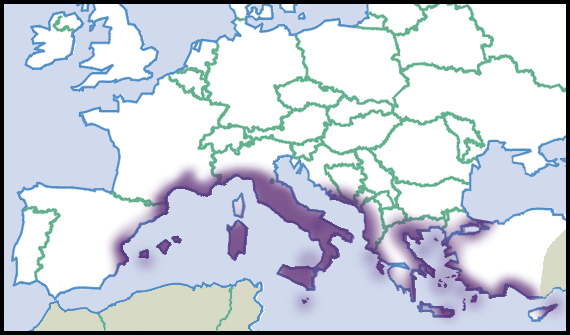
Distribution

This species occurs around the Mediterranean Sea.
