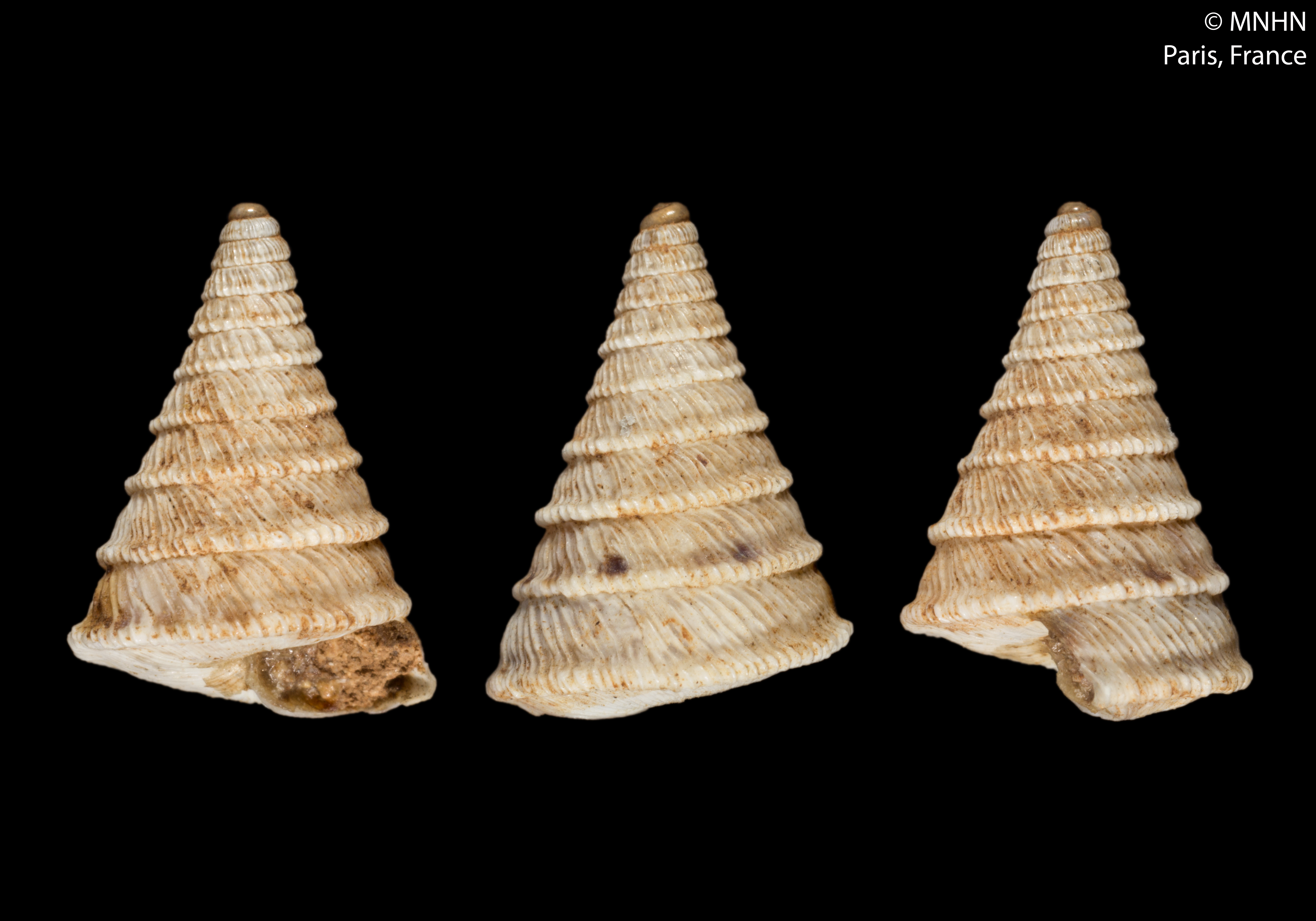
- Shell of Trochoidea caroni (syntype at MNHN, Paris)

Conservation status
- Least Concern (IUCN 3.1)

Scientific classification
- Kingdom: Animalia
- Phylum: Mollusca
- Class: Gastropoda
- Order: Stylommatophora
- Family: Geomitridae
- Genus: Trochoidea
- Species: T. caroni

Binomial name
- Trochoidea caroni (Deshayes, 1832)

Synonyms
- Helix caroni Deshayes, 1832 (original combination); Helix elata Rossmässler, 1837 (junior synonym); Trochoidea (Trochoidea) caroni (Deshayes, 1832) · alternate representation

= Trochoidea caroni =

Species of gastropod

Trochoidea caroni is a species of air-breathing land snail, a terrestrial pulmonate gastropod mollusk in the family Geomitridae, the hairy snails and their allies.

== Distribution ==
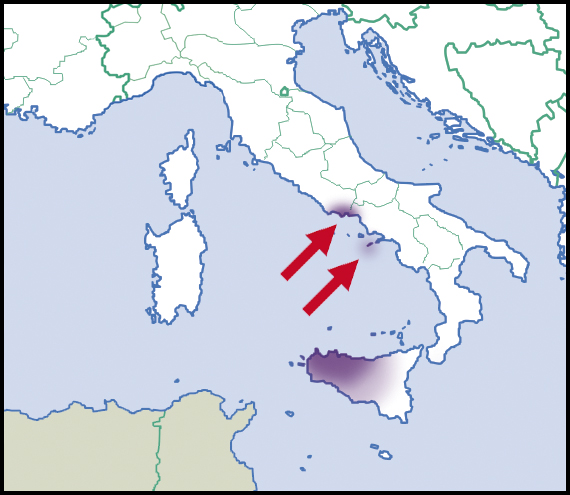
Distribution

This species is endemic to Italy.
