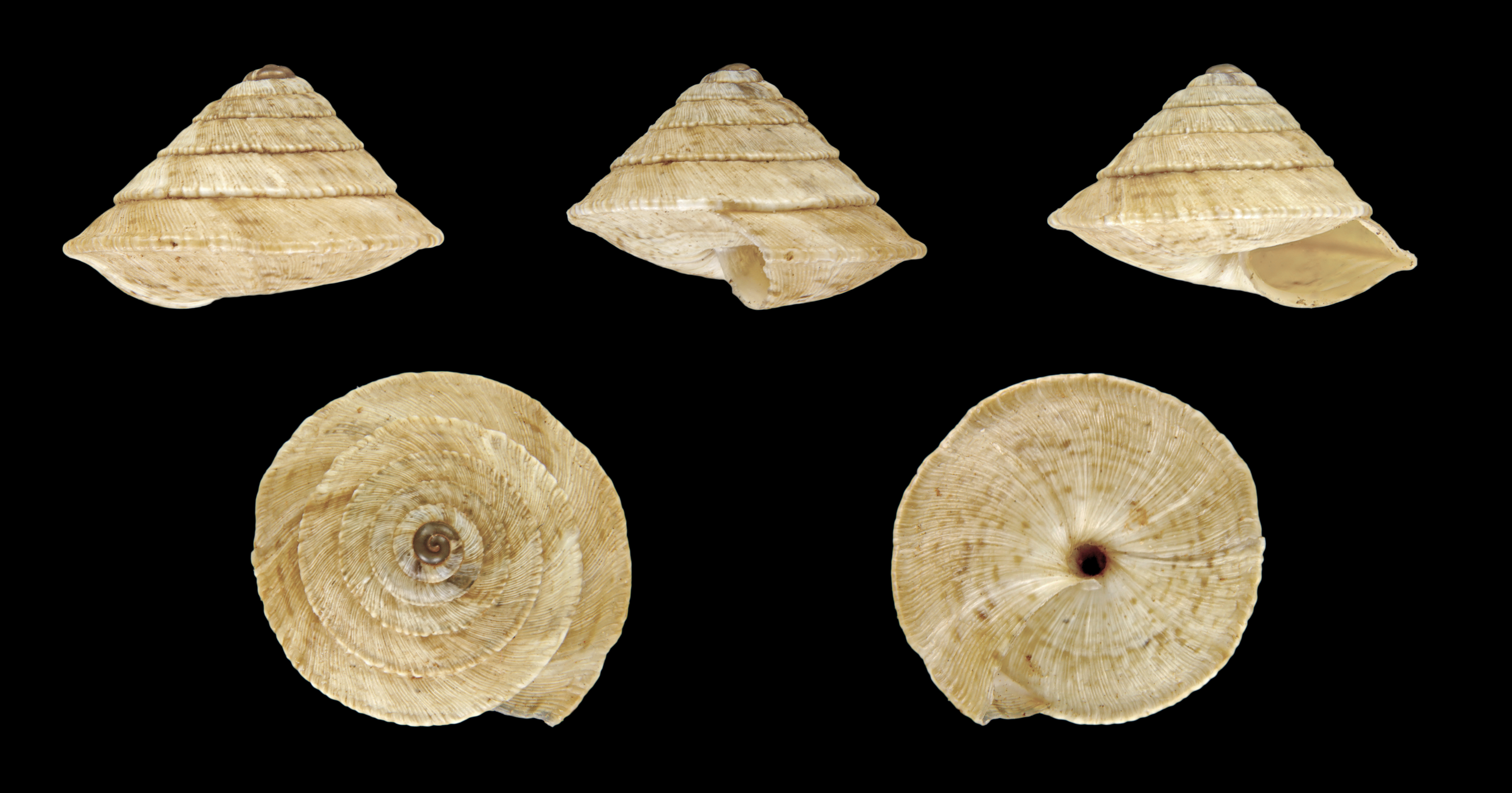

Conservation status
- Least Concern (IUCN 3.1)

- Secure (NatureServe)

Scientific classification
- Kingdom: Animalia
- Phylum: Mollusca
- Class: Gastropoda
- Order: Stylommatophora
- Family: Geomitridae
- Genus: Trochoidea
- Species: T. elegans

Binomial name
- Trochoidea elegans (Gmelin, 1791)

Synonyms
- Helix elegans Gmelin, 1791 (original combination); Trochoidea scitula G.J. De Cristofori & G. Jan, 1832; Trochoidea solarium A. Risso, 1826; Trochoidea terrestris E. Donovan, 1801; Trochoidea trochillus J.L.M. Poiret, 1789; Trochoidea trochlea L. Pfeiffer, 1846; Trochoidea (Trochoidea) elegans (Gmelin, 1791) alternate representation

= Trochoidea elegans =

Species of gastropod

Trochoidea elegans is a species of European air-breathing land snail, a terrestrial pulmonate gastropod mollusk in the family Geomitridae, the hairy snails and their allies.

== Distribution ==
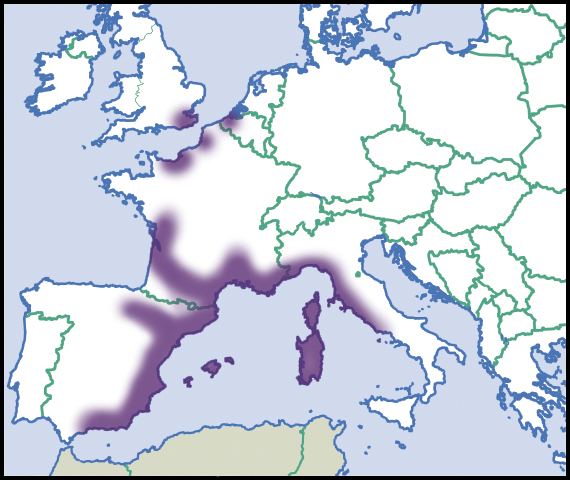
Distribution

This species is known to occur in a number of European countries and islands including:

- Great Britain
- France
- Belgium
- Germany
- Spain
- Italy, including Sardinia
