= Xerocrassa gharlapsi =

Conservation status
- Vulnerable (IUCN 2.3)

Scientific classification
- Domain: Eukaryota
- Kingdom: Animalia
- Phylum: Mollusca
- Class: Gastropoda
- Order: Stylommatophora
- Family: Geomitridae
- Genus: Xerocrassa
- Species: X. gharlapsi

Binomial name
- Xerocrassa gharlapsi (Beckmann, 1987)

Synonyms
- Trochoidea gharlapsi Beckmann, 1987; Trochoidea (Xeroclausa) gharlapsi Beckmann, 1987 (original combination); Xerocrassa (Xeroclausa) gharlapsi (Beckmann, 1987) · alternate representation

Species of gastropod

Xerocrassa gharlapsi is a species of air-breathing land snail, a pulmonate gastropod mollusk in the family Geomitridae.

== Distribution ==
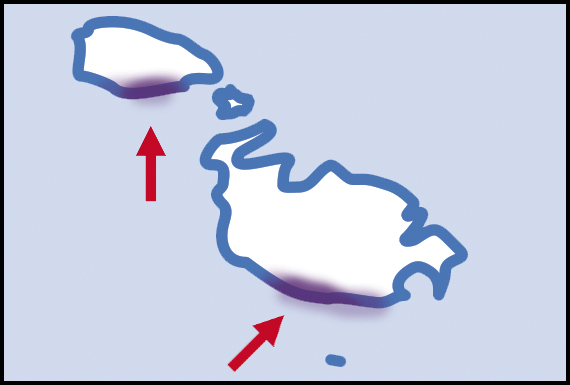
Distribution

This species is endemic to Malta.
