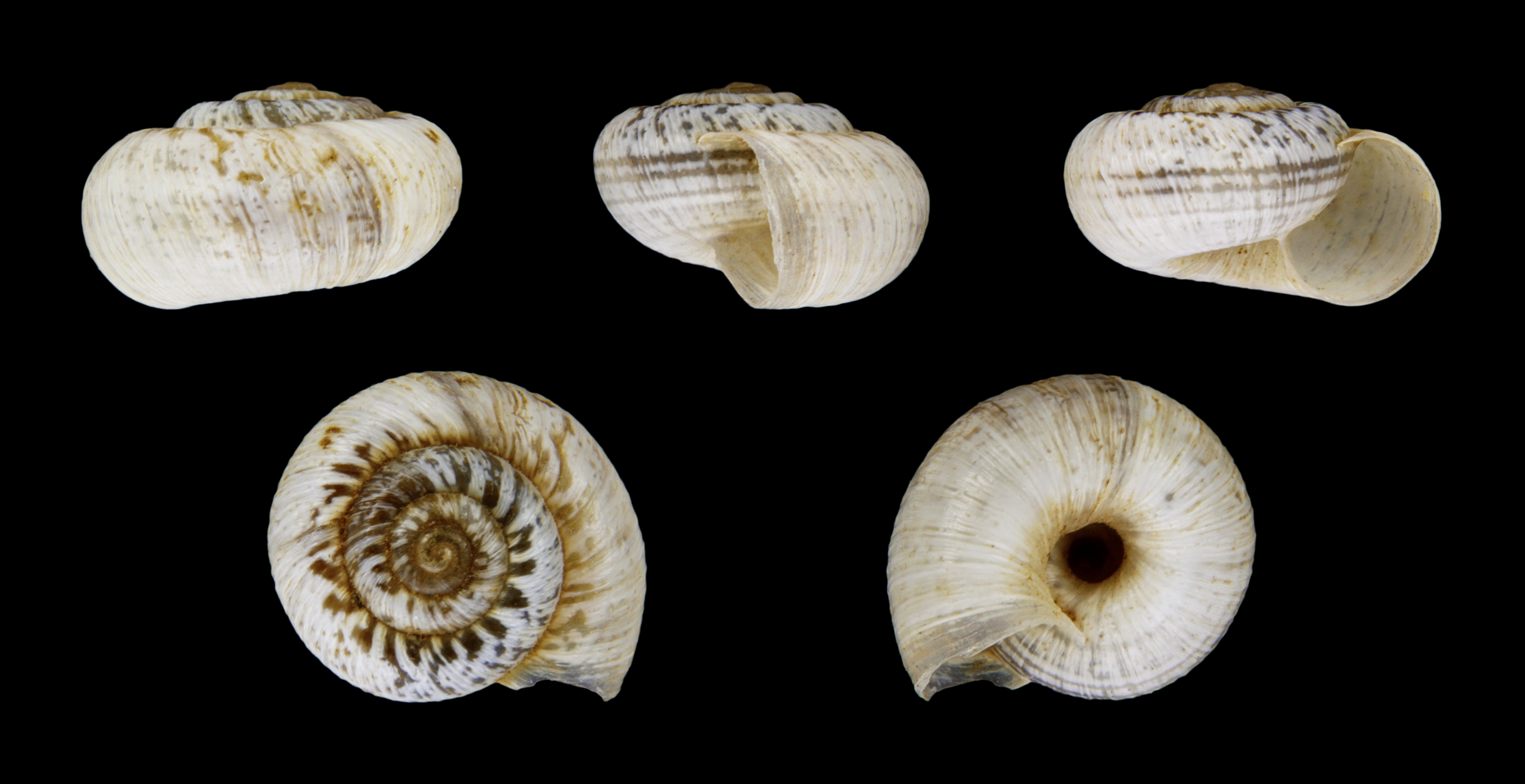

Scientific classification
- Kingdom: Animalia
- Phylum: Mollusca
- Class: Gastropoda
- Order: Stylommatophora
- Family: Geomitridae
- Genus: Xerotricha
- Species: X. apicina

Binomial name
- Xerotricha apicina (Lamarck, 1822)

Synonyms
- Helicella (Xerotricha) apicina (Lamarck, 1822) (superseded generic combination); Helix apicina Lamarck, 1822 (original name); Helix bucheti Mabille, 1898; Helix horridula Westerlund, 1892 (junior synonym); Helix hypaeana Bourguignat in Locard, 1882 (junior synonym)

= Xerotricha apicina =

Species of gastropod

Xerotricha apicina is a species of small air-breathing land snailin the family Geomitridae. It is found in southern Europe (including Cyprus, Greete), North Africa (Tunisia, Morocco), and Macaronesia (Madeira, Azores, Canary Islands, Cape Verde).

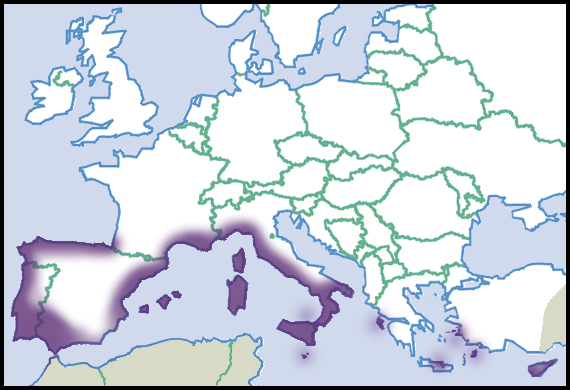
Partial distribution
