= List of non-marine molluscs of Cyprus =

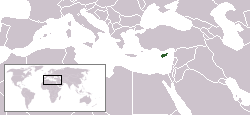
Location of Cyprus

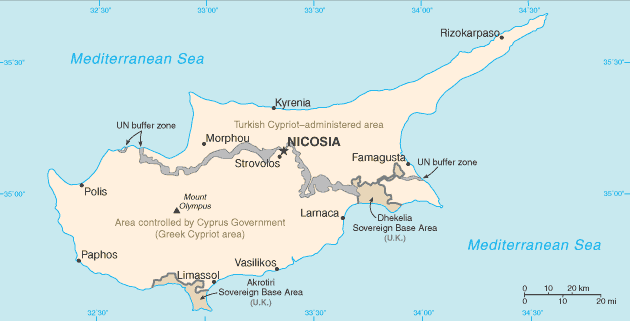
topography of Cyprus

The non-marine molluscs of Cyprus are a part of the molluscan fauna of Cyprus (wildlife of Cyprus).

A number of species of non-marine molluscs are found in the wild in Cyprus.

== Freshwater gastropods ==
Freshwater gastropods in Cyprus include:

Neritidae

- Theodoxus anatolicus (Recluz 1841)

Melanopsidae

- Melanopsis praemorsa (Linnaeus 1758)

Hydrobiidae

- Islamia mylonas Radea, Parmakelis, Demetropoulos & Vardinoyannis, 2017
- Pseudamnicola malickyi Schütt 1980

Tateidae

- Potamopyrgus antipodarum (Gray 1843)

Lymnaeidae

- Galba truncatula (O. F. Müller 1774)
- Radix peregra (O. F. Müller 1774)

Physidae

- Physella acuta (Draparnaud 1801)

Planorbidae

- Ancylus fluviatilis O. F. Müller 1774
- Gyraulus piscinarum (Bourguignat 1852)

== Land gastropods ==
Land gastropods in Cyprus include: Ellobiidae

- Carychium sp.

Succineidae

- Succinea putris (Linnaeus, 1758)

Cochlicopidae

- Cochlicopa lubrica (O. F. Müller, 1774)

Lauridae

- Lauria cylindracea (Da Costa, 1778)

Orculidae

- Orculella sirianocoriensis (Mousson, 1854)

Pleurodiscidae

- Pleurodiscus cyprius (Kobelt, 1896)

Pyramidulidae

- Pyramidula pusilla (Vallot, 1801)
- Pyramidula rupestris (Draparnaud, 1801)

Truncatellinidae

- Truncatellina cylindrica (J. B. Férussac, 1807) (as Truncatellina rothi (Reinhardt, 1916))

Valloniidae

- Gittenbergia sororcula (Benoit, 1859)
- Vallonia pulchella (O. F. Müller, 1774)

Chondrinidae

- Granopupa granum (Draparnaud, 1801)
- Rupestrella rhodia (J. R. Roth, 1839)

Enidae

- Buliminus carneus (Pfeiffer, 1846)
- Euchondrus ledereri (Pfeiffer, 1868)
- Euchondrus limbodentatus (Mousson, 1854)
- Euchondrus nucifragus (Pfeiffer, 1848)
- Euchondrus parreyssi (Pfeiffer, 1846)
- Multidentula lamellifera (Rossmässler, 1858)
- Multidentula stylus (Pfeiffer, 1848)
- Paramastus cyprius Zilch, 1951
- Turanena katerinae E. Gittenberger, 1996
- Zebrina fasciolata (Olivier, 1801)

Clausiliidae

- Albinaria alajana cypria Nordsieck, 1993
- Albinaria greeni Tomlin, 1935
  - Albinaria greeni amorosa H. Nordsieck, 2021
  - Albinaria greeni greeni Tomlin, 1935
- Albinaria mavromoustakisi Brandt, 1961
- Albinaria rollei (Boettger, 1896)
- Albinaria saxatilis (Pfeiffer, 1846)
  - Albinaria saxatilis avia (Charpentier, 1852)
  - Albinaria saxatilis saxatilis (Pfeiffer, 1846)
- Albinaria virgo (Mousson, 1854)
- Elia moesta (Rossmässler, 1839)

Punctidae

- Paralaoma servilis (Shuttleworth, 1852)
- Punctum pygmaeum (Draparnaud, 1801)

Oxychilidae

- Carpathica cretica (Forcart, 1950)
- Daudebardia rufa (Draparnaud, 1805)
- Eopolita protensa (A. Férussac, 1832)
- Mediterranea hydatina (Rossmässler, 1838)
- Oxychilus camelinus (Bourguignat, 1852)
- Oxychilus cyprius (L. Pfeiffer, 1847)
- Oxychilus mavromoustakisi (F. Haas, 1934)

Pristilomatidae

- Gollumia torumbilicata Schütt, 2001
- Vitrea contracta (Westerlund, 1871)
- Vitrea cyprina Westerlund, 1902

Agriolimacidae

- Deroceras berytensis (Bourguignat, 1852)
- Deroceras chrysorroyatissensis Rähle, 1984
- Deroceras famagustensis Rähle, 1991

Limacidae

- Limacus flavus (Linnaeus, 1758)

Milacidae

- Milax barypus Bourguignat, 1866
- Milax riedeli Wiktor, 1986
- Tandonia sowerbyi (A. Férussac, 1823)

Achatinidae

- Rumina saharica Pallary, 1901

Ferrusaciidae

- Calaxis hierosolymarum (J. R. Roth, 1855) (occasionally as Calaxis cypria (Kobelt, 1896))
- Cecilioides acicula (O. F. Müller, 1774)
- Cecilioides tumulorum (Bourguignat, 1856)
- Hohenwartiana hohenwarti (Rossmässler, 1839)

Geomitridae

- Candidula syrensis (Pfeiffer, 1846)
- Cochlicella acuta (Muller, 1774)
- Cochlicella conoidea (Draparnaud, 1801)
- Helicella juglans Gittenberger, 1991
- Helicopsis filimargo (Krynicki, 1833)
- Helicopsis cypriola (Westerlund, 1889)
- Microxeromagna armillata (Lowe, 1852)
- Pseudoxerophila confusa Gittenberger, 1991
- Trochoidea liebetruti (Albers, 1852)
- Trochoidea pyramidata (Draparnaud, 1805)
- Xerocrassa carinatoglobosa (Haas, 1934)
- Xerocrassa cretica (L. Pfeiffer, 1841)
- Xerocrassa nicosiana (Gittenberger, 1991)
- Xeromunda candiota (Mousson, 1854)
- Xeropicta akrotirica Gittenberger, 1991
- Xeropicta krynickii (Krynicki, 1833) (including Ceropicta smyrnocretica and Xeropicta vestalis)
- Xeropicta ledereri (Pfeiffer, 1856)
  - Xeropicta ledereri ledereri (Pfeiffer, 1856)
  - Xeropicta ledereri mavromoustakisi (Haas, 1933)
- Xeropicta mesopotamica (Mousson, 1874)
- Xerotricha apicina (Lamarck, 1822)
- Xerotricha conspurcata (Draparnaud, 1801)

Hygromiidae

- Metafruticicola berytensis (L. Pfeiffer, 1841)
- Metafruticicola nicosianus (Mousson, 1854)
- Monacha syriaca (Ehrenberg, 1831)

Helicidae

- Cantareus apertus (Born, 1778)
- Cornu aspersum (O. F. Müller, 1774)
- Eobania vermiculata (O. F. Müller, 1774)
- Assyriella bellardii (Mousson, 1854)
- Helix cincta O. F. Müller, 1758
- Helix nucula Mousson, 1854 (occasionally as Helix texta)
- Levantina spiriplana (Olivier, 1801)
- Theba pisana (O. F. Müller, 1774)

Polygyridae

- Polygyra cereolus (Megerle von Mühlfeldt, 1818)

Trissexodontidae

- Caracollina lenticula (Michaud, 1831)

== Freshwater bivalves ==
Freshwater bivalves in Cyprus include:

Sphaeriidae

- Pisidium casertanum (Poli 1795)

== See also ==
Lists of molluscs of surrounding oversea countries:

- List of non-marine molluscs of Turkey
- List of non-marine molluscs of Syria
- List of non-marine molluscs of Lebanon
- List of non-marine molluscs of Israel
- List of non-marine molluscs of Egypt
