= List of non-marine molluscs of Lebanon =

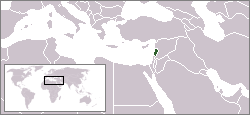
Location of Lebanon

The non-marine molluscs of Lebanon are a part of the molluscan fauna of Lebanon. A number of species of non-marine molluscs are found in the wild in Lebanon. In addition, a number of gastropod species are reared in captivity in greenhouses, aquaria and terraria.

== Freshwater gastropods ==
Neritidae

- Theodoxus jordani (Sowerby, 1832)

Melanopsidae

- Melanopsis buccinoidea (Olivier, 1801)

Cochliopidae

- Eupaludestrina longiscata (Bourguignat, 1856)

Hydrobiidae

- Belgrandiella libanica Schütt, 1993
- Islamia gaillardoti (Germain, 1911)
- Radomaniola gaillardotii (Bourguignat, 1856)

Tateidae

- Potamopyrgus antipodarum (J. E. Gray, 1843)

Bithyniidae

- Pseudobithynia amiqensis Glöer & Bößneck, 2007
- Pseudobithynia kathrini Glöer & Bößneck, 2007
- Pseudobithynia levantica Glöer & Bößneck, 2007

Valvatidae

- Valvata saulcyi (Bourguignat, 1853)

Lymnaeidae

- Galba truncatula (O. F. Müller, 1774)
- Lymnaea stagnalis (Linnaeus, 1758)
- Radix auricularia (Linnaeus, 1758)
- Stagnicola cf. berlani (Bourguignat, 1870)

Physidae

- Physella acuta (Draparnaud, 1805)

Planorbidae

- Ancylus fluviatilis (O. F. Müller, 1774)
- Gyraulus bekaensis Glöer & Bößneck, 2007
- Gyraulus homsensis (Dautzenberg, 1894)
- Gyraulus piscinarum (Bourguignat, 1852)
- Planorbis carinatus O. F. Müller, 1774

== Land gastropods ==
Succineidae

- Oxyloma cf. elegans (Risso, 1826)

Lauriidae

- Lauria cylindracea (Da Costa, 1778)

Orculidae

- Orculella sirianocoriensis libanotica (Tristram, 1865)
- Orculella mesopotamica riedeli Hausdorf, 1996

Enidae

- Buliminus damascensis (Pallary, 1929)
- Euchondrus septemdentatus (Roth, 1839)
- Euchondrus cf. ledereri (L. Pfeiffer, 1868)
- Pene bulimoides (L. Pfeiffer, 1842)
- Pene kotschyi (L. Pfeiffer, 1854)
- Pene louisi (Germain, 1911)
- Pene syriacus (L. Pfeiffer, 1864)
- Turanena benjamitica (Benson, 1859)

Pleurodiscidae

- Pleurodiscus erdelii (Roth, 1839)

Clausiliidae

- Cristataria albersi (Charpentier, 1852)
- Cristataria boissieri (Charpentier, 1847)
- Cristataria cylindrelliformis (Bourguignat, 1855)
- Cristataria delesserti (Bourguignat, 1853)
- Cristataria dutaillyana (Bourguignat, 1868)
- Cristataria florieni (Pallary, 1939)
- Cristataria hedenborgi (L. Pfeiffer, 1849)
- Cristataria porrecta (Rossmässler, 1857)
- Cristataria staudingeri (O. Boettger, 1890)
- Cristataria strangulata (L. Pfeiffer, 1841)
- Cristataria vesicalis (Rossmässler, 1857)
- Cristataria zelebori (Rossmässler, 1856)
- Cristataria zilchi H. Nordsieck, 1971
- Elia moesta (Rossmässler, 1839)

Oxychilidae

- Eopolita protensa jebusitica (Roth, 1855)
- Libania saulcyi (Bourguignat, 1852)
- Oxychilus renanianus (Pallary, 1939)
- Oxychilus syriacus (Kobelt, 1879)

Limacidae

- Limacus flavus (Linnaeus, 1758)

Agriolimacidae

- Deroceras berytensis (Bourguignat, 1852)
- Deroceras libanoticum (Pollonera, 1909)

Geomitridae

- Cochlicella acuta (O. F. Müller, 1774)
- Xeropicta krynickii (Krynicki, 1833)

Hygromiidae

- Metafruticicola berytensis (L. Pfeiffer, 1841)
- Metafruticicola fourousi (Bourguignat, 1863)
- Monacha bari Forcart 1981
- Monacha cf. compingtae (Pallary, 1929)
- Monacha crispulata (Mousson, 1861)
- Monacha nummus (Ehrenberg, 1831)
- Monacha obstructa (L. Pfeiffer, 1842)
- Monacha solitudinis (Bourguignat, 1852)
- Monacha syriaca (Ehrenberg, 1831)

Helicidae

- Cornu aspersum (O. F. Müller, 1774)
- Eobania vermiculata (O. F. Müller, 1774)
- Helix engaddensis (Bourguignat, 1852)

Sphincterochilidae

- Sphincterochila fimbriata (Bourguignat, 1852)

== Freshwater bivalves ==
Sphaeriidae

- Musculium lacustre (O. F. Müller, 1774)
- Pisidium amnicum (O. F. Müller, 1774)
- Pisidium casertanum (Poli, 1791)
- Pisidium subtruncatum Malm, 1855
- Pisidium tenuilineatum Stelfox, 1918
- Pisidium personatum Malm, 1855

== See also ==
- List of marine molluscs of Lebanon

Lists of molluscs of surrounding countries:

- List of non-marine molluscs of Israel
- List of non-marine molluscs of Syria
