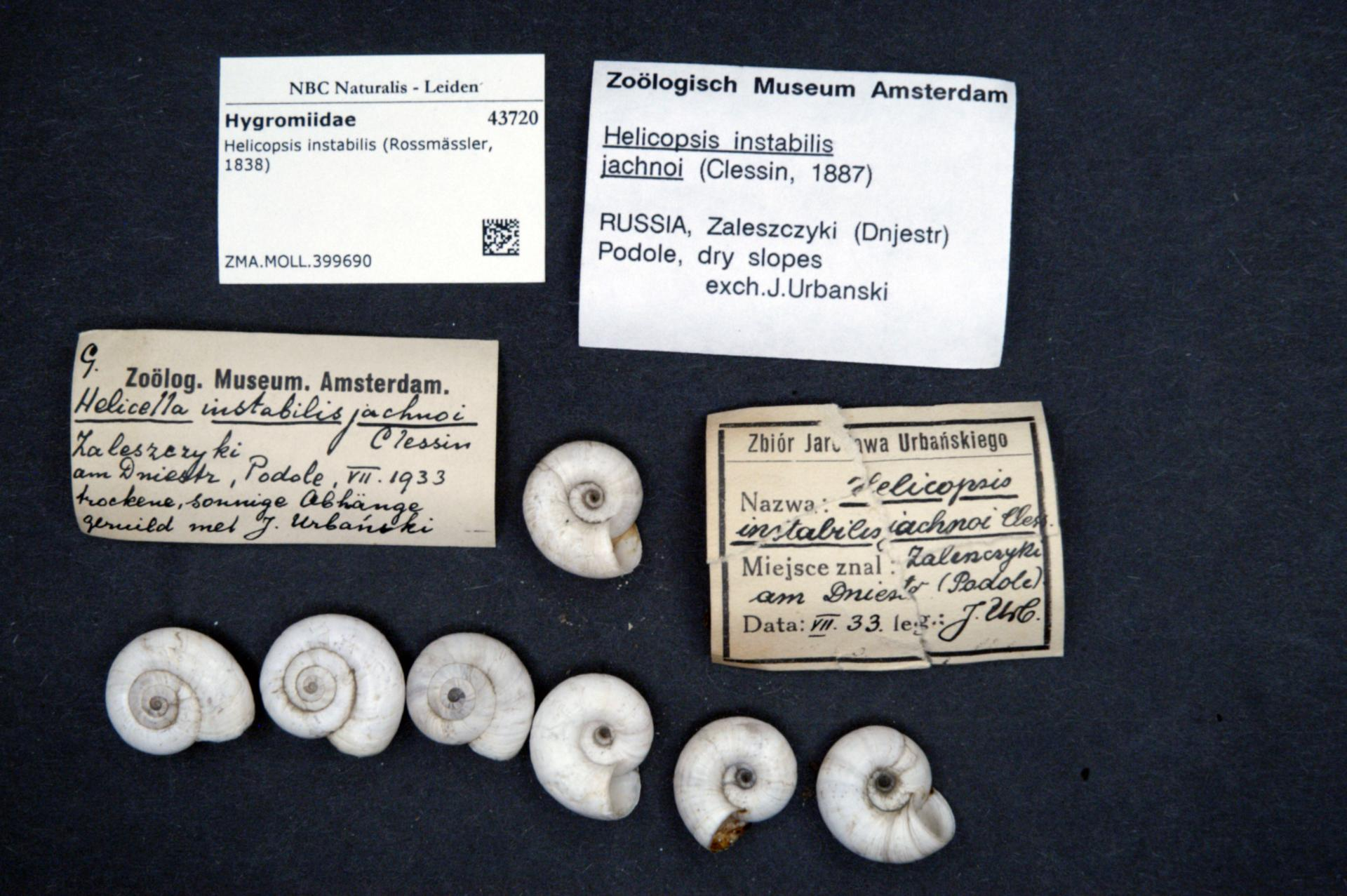
- Shell of Helicopsis lunulata (specimen at Naturalis Biodiversity Center)

Scientific classification
- Kingdom: Animalia
- Phylum: Mollusca
- Class: Gastropoda
- Order: Stylommatophora
- Superfamily: Helicoidea
- Family: Geomitridae
- Genus: Helicopsis
- Species: H. lunulata

Binomial name
- Helicopsis lunulata (Krynicki, 1833)

Synonyms
- Helicopsis instabilis (Rossmässler, 1838) (junior synonym); Helix instabilis Rossmässler, 1838; Helix instabilis var. bakowskyana Clessin, 1879 (suspected synonym); Helix lunulata Krynicki, 1833 (original name)

= Helicopsis lunulata =

Species of gastropod

Helicopsis lunulata is a species of air-breathing land snail, terrestrial pulmonate gastropod mollusc in the family Geomitridae from Eastern Europe.

== Taxonomy ==
Before 2020 Helicopsis lunulata was considered to be a synonym of Helicopsis striata and most of its populations were assigned to the latter species, though some large forms were treated as a separate species Helicopsis instabilis (Rossmässler, 1838).

Helicopsis cereoflava (Bielz, 1851) from Romania is probably a synonym of this species.

== Distribution ==
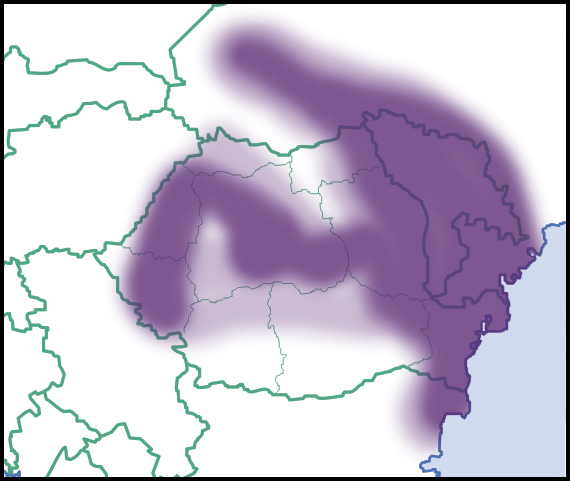
Distribution

This species occurs in following countries:

- Ukraine
- Moldova
- Romania
- Russia
- Poland (probably)
- Germany (invasive, one colony)
