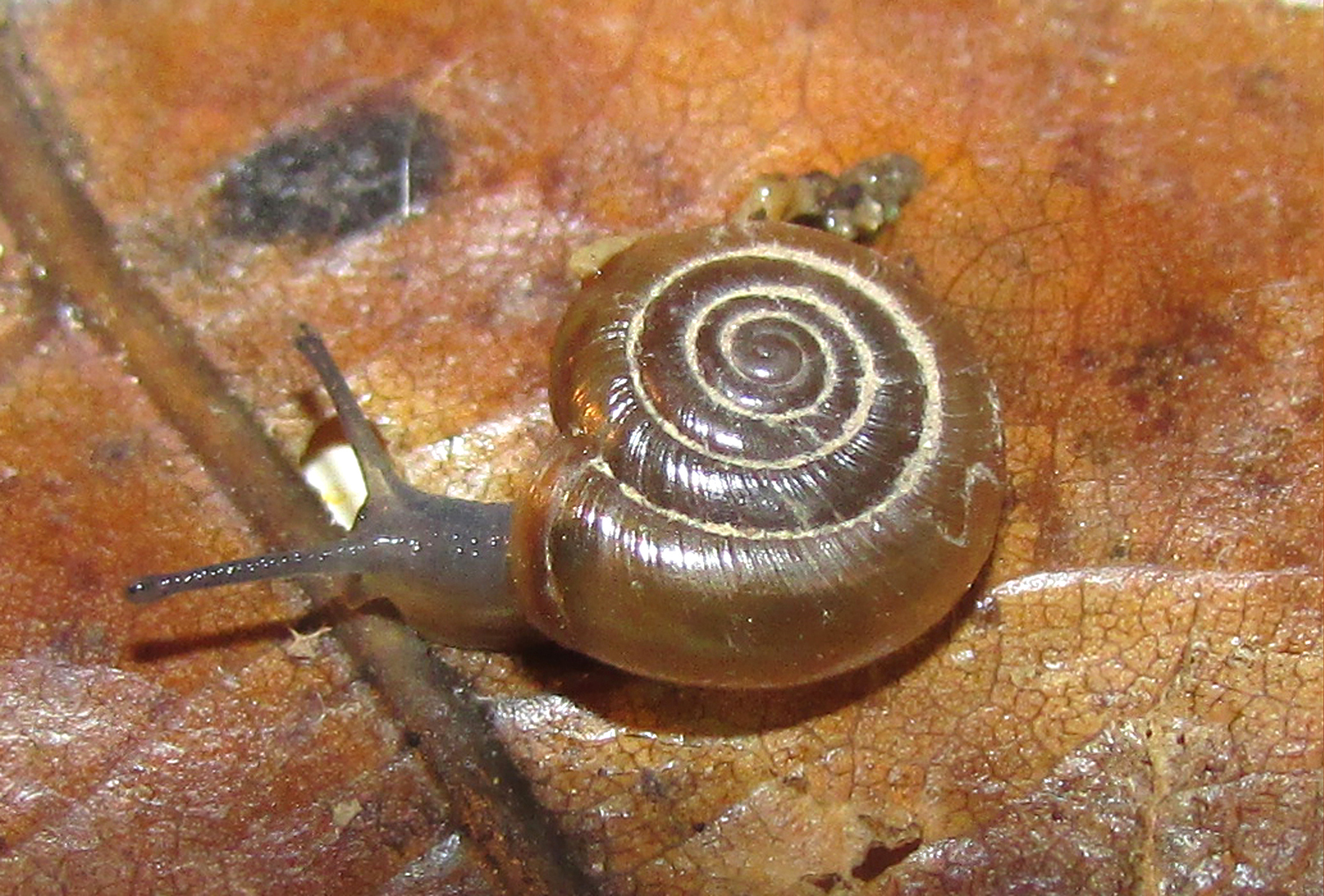
- A live individual of Oxychilus camelinus

Scientific classification
- Kingdom: Animalia
- Phylum: Mollusca
- Class: Gastropoda
- Order: Stylommatophora
- Family: Oxychilidae
- Genus: Oxychilus
- Species: O. camelinus

Binomial name
- Oxychilus camelinus (Bourguignat, 1852)

Synonyms
- Helix camelina Bourguignat, 1852

= Oxychilus camelinus =

Species of gastropod

Oxychilus camelinus is a species of small air-breathing land snail, a terrestrial pulmonate gastropod mollusk in the family Oxychilidae, the glass snails.

== Description ==
This species was described under the name Helix camelina from today's Lebanon by Jules René Bourguignat in 1852.

The shape of the shell is almost flat, and the color is light horn. The shell has up to almost 6 whorls, which slowly increase. The last whorl is not much wider than the previous whorl, and is flat on the lower side. The suture is deep. The shell has distinct radial growth lines. The umbilicus is narrow and 1/8 of the shell diameter. The aperture is obliquely depressed.

The width of the shell is 7.1–11 mm (0.28–0.43 in) and the height of the shell is 4.0–4.5 mm (0.16–0.18 in). The width of the last whorl is 1.9–2.0 mm (0.075–0.079 in); the width of the umbilicus is 0.7–1.1 mm (0.028–0.043 in).

The color of the tentacles, head and neck is light-grey. The color of the sole is white-yellow.

Balcanodiscus frywaldskyanus is a similar species.

== Distribution ==
This species occurs in countries including:

- Lebanon - the type locality is near Baalbek in Lebanon (in Latin: "prope Heliopolim (Baalbek)").
- Israel
- Turkey
- Greece
- Cyprus
- Bulgaria - only two localities are known: Rahat Tepe Hill in Plovdiv city, and in Stara Zagora
- Albania

Some scientists consider this species to be non-indigenous to Europe.

== Ecology ==
Oxychilus camelinus is a synanthropic species which inhabits dry and rocky habitats, often gardens.

After copulation, snails were observed to lay up to a total of 8 eggs, in groups of 1-4 eggs. The size of the eggs was 1.7 mm (0.067 in).

Oxychilus camelinus feeds on green plant matter and on detritus. These snails can be fed in captivity using cucumber, aquarium fish food, and pork meat.
