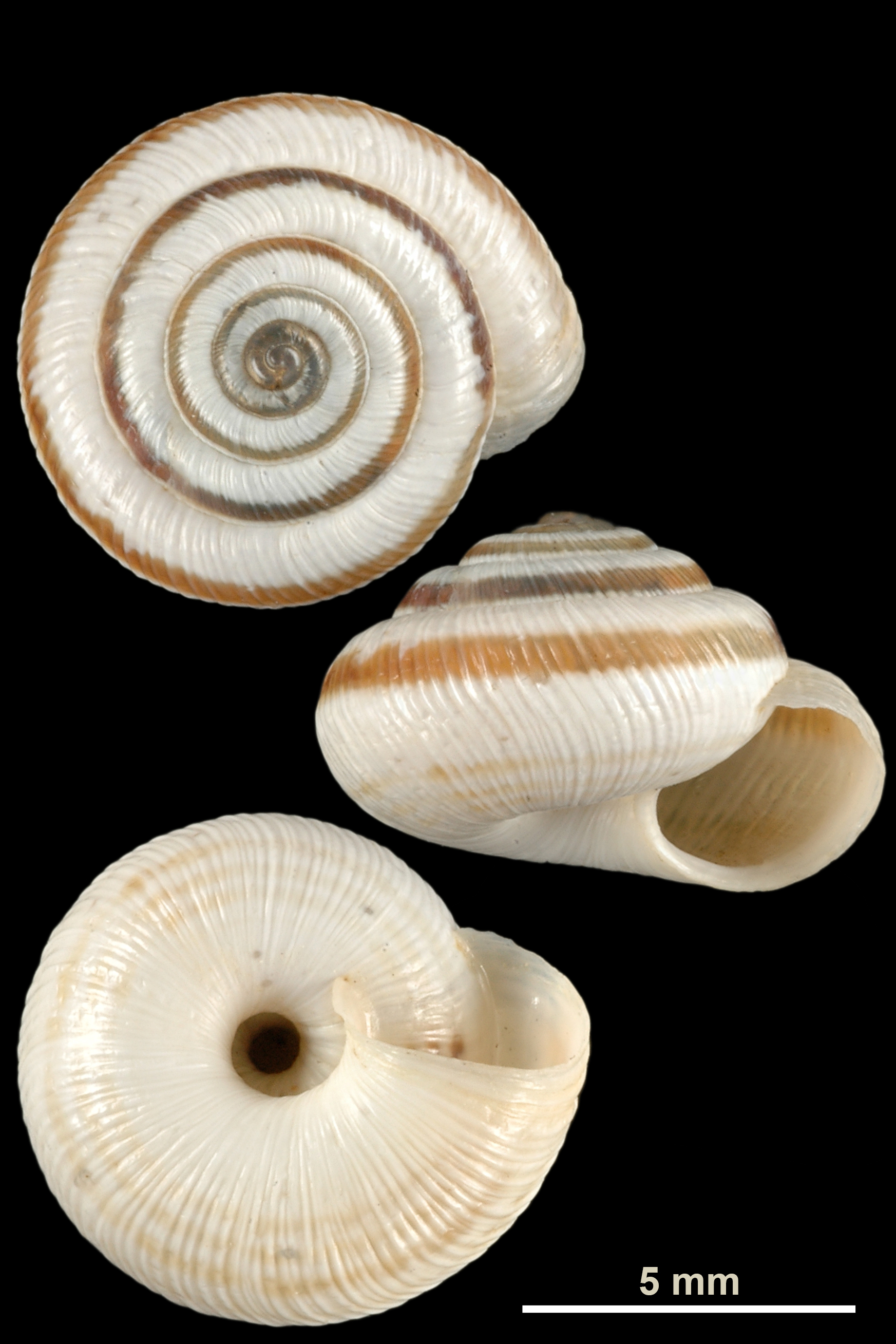
- Shell of Helicopsis striata (specimen at MNHN, Paris)

Conservation status
- Least Concern (IUCN 3.1)

Scientific classification
- Kingdom: Animalia
- Phylum: Mollusca
- Class: Gastropoda
- Order: Stylommatophora
- Family: Geomitridae
- Genus: Helicopsis
- Species: H. striata

Binomial name
- Helicopsis striata (O. F. Müller, 1774)

Synonyms
- Helicopsis (Helicopsis) striata (O. F. Müller, 1774); Helix coelata Vallot, 1801 junior subjective synonym; Helix muehlfeldtiana Rossmässler, 1837; Helix striata O. F. Müller, 1774 (original combination); Xerocrassa muehlfeldtiana (Rossmässler, 1837)

= Helicopsis striata =

Species of gastropod

Helicopsis striata is a species of air-breathing land snail, terrestrial pulmonate gastropod mollusk in the family Geomitridae.

Helicopsis striata is the type species of the genus Helicopsis.

== Subspecies ==
Until 2018 there where three subspecies within this species and they included:

- Helicopsis striata austriacaE. Gittenberger, 1969 - mentioned in annex II of Habitats Directive : synonym of Helicopsis austriaca E. Gittenberger, 1969 (invalid combination)
- Helicopsis striata hungarica: synonym of Helicopsis hungarica (Soós & H. Wagner, 1935) (invalid combination)
- Helicopsis striata striata O. F. Müller, 1774)

Since 2018 H. austriaca and H. hungarica are listed as separate species.

== Distribution ==
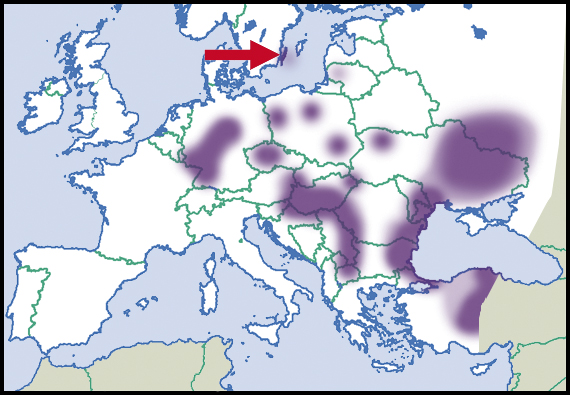
Distribution

This species occurs in Central Europe only, including:

- Germany
- Austria - main distribution in Steinfeld, Lower Austria
- Sweden
- The Czech Republic - Bohemia, locally extinct in Moravia
- Slovakia
- Poland

Populations from Ukraine, Moldova, Romania and Russia that were previously considered to be H. striata are actually representing Helicopsis lunulata (Krynicki, 1833) or in some cases Helicopsis filimargo (Krynicki, 1833).
