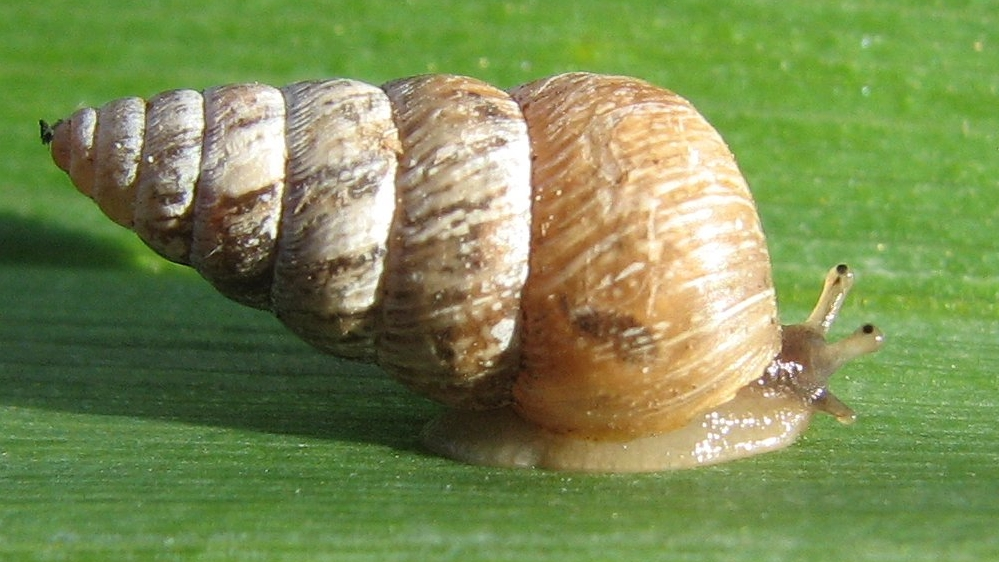
- Cochlicella barbara

Scientific classification
- Kingdom: Animalia
- Phylum: Mollusca
- Class: Gastropoda
- Order: Stylommatophora
- Family: Geomitridae
- Subfamily: Geomitrinae
- Tribe: Cochlicellini; Schileyko, 1972

Genera
- See text

= Cochlicellini =

Tribe of gastropods

Cochlicellini is a tribe of small air-breathing land snails, terrestrial pulmonate gastropod mollusks in the family Geomitridae (superfamily Helicoidea).

According to the taxonomy of the Gastropoda by Bouchet & Rocroi, 2005, it was considered as a separate family, Cochlicellidae, within the superfamily Helicoidea.

== Genera ==
The type genus is Cochlicella. Férussac, 1821

Genera in the tribe Cochlicellini include:

- Cochlicella Férussac, 1821
  - subgenus Prietocella Schileyko & Menkhorst, 1997
- Monilearia Mousson, 1872
- Obelus W. Hartmann, 1842
- Ripkeniella Hutterer & E. Gittenberger, 1998
