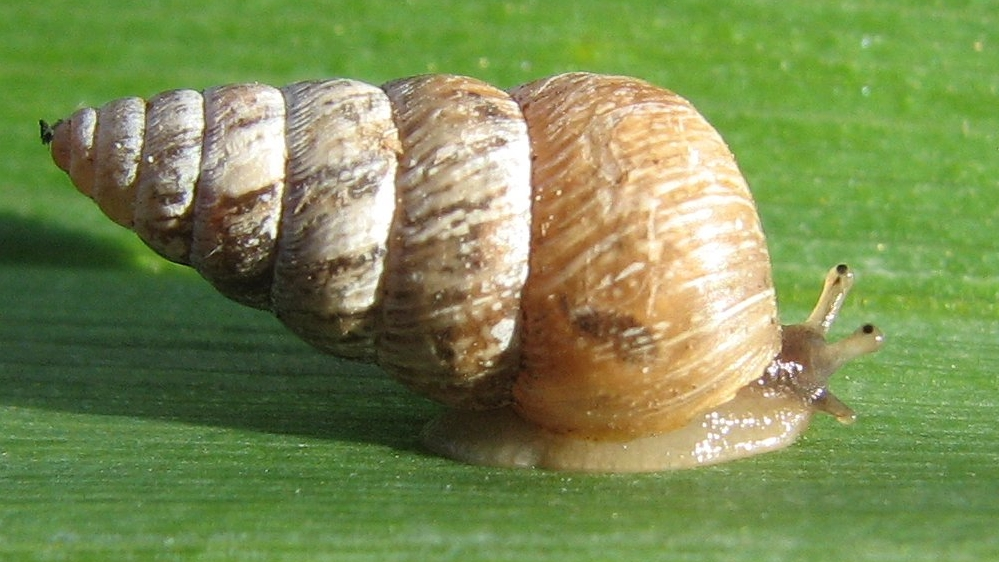
- Cochlicella barbara

Scientific classification
- Kingdom: Animalia
- Phylum: Mollusca
- Class: Gastropoda
- Order: Stylommatophora
- Family: Geomitridae
- Subfamily: Geomitrinae
- Tribe: Cochlicellini
- Genus: Cochlicella; Férussac, 1821

Synonyms
- Cochlicella (Cochlicella) A. Férussac, 1821· accepted, alternate representation; Cochlicella (Prietocella) Schileyko & Menkhorst, 1997· accepted, alternate representation; Cochlicellus H. Beck, 1837 (invalid: unjustified emendation of Cochlicella); Elisma W. Turton, 1831; Helix (Cochlicella) A. Férussac, 1821; Helix (Cochlicelle) [sic] (misspelling); Longaeva Menke, 1828; Prietocella Schileyko & Menkhorst, 1997; Xeroacuta Monterosato, 1892

= Cochlicella =

Genus of gastropods

Cochlicella is a genus of small, narrow-shelled, air-breathing land snails, terrestrial pulmonate gastropod mollusks in the family Geomitridae, previously placed in the Helicidae, Cochlicellidae or Hygromiidae.

This genus has not yet become established in the USA, but it is considered to represent a potentially serious threat as a pest, an invasive species which could negatively affect agriculture, natural ecosystems, human health or commerce. Therefore it has been suggested that this species be given top national quarantine significance in the USA.

== Species ==
Species within the genus Cochlicella include:

- Cochlicella acuta (Müller, 1774)
- Cochlicella barbara (Linnaeus, 1758)
- Cochlicella conoidea (Draparnaud, 1801)

Species brought into synonymy

- Cochlicella bulimoides Moquin-Tandon, 1855: synonym of Cochlicella barbara (Linnaeus, 1758)
- Cochlicella cognata Rossmässler, 1837: synonym of Cochlicella conoidea (Draparnaud, 1801) (junior synonym)
- Cochlicella meridionalis Risso, 1826: synonym of Cochlicella acuta (O. F. Müller, 1774) (junior synonym)
- Cochlicella turricula Risso, 1826: synonym of Cochlicella acuta (O. F. Müller, 1774) (junior synonym)

== Gallery ==
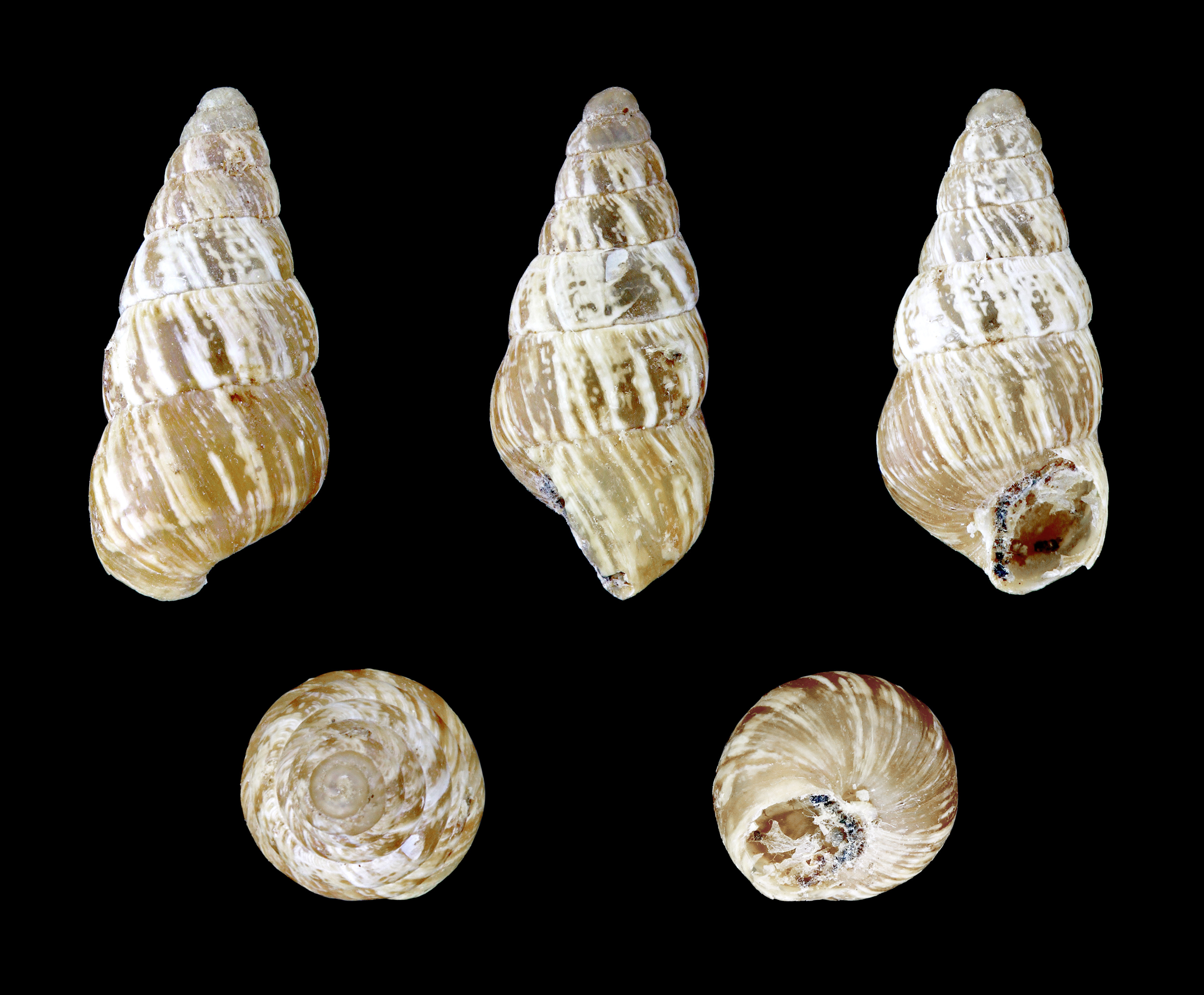
Cochlicella acuta acuta (subadult)

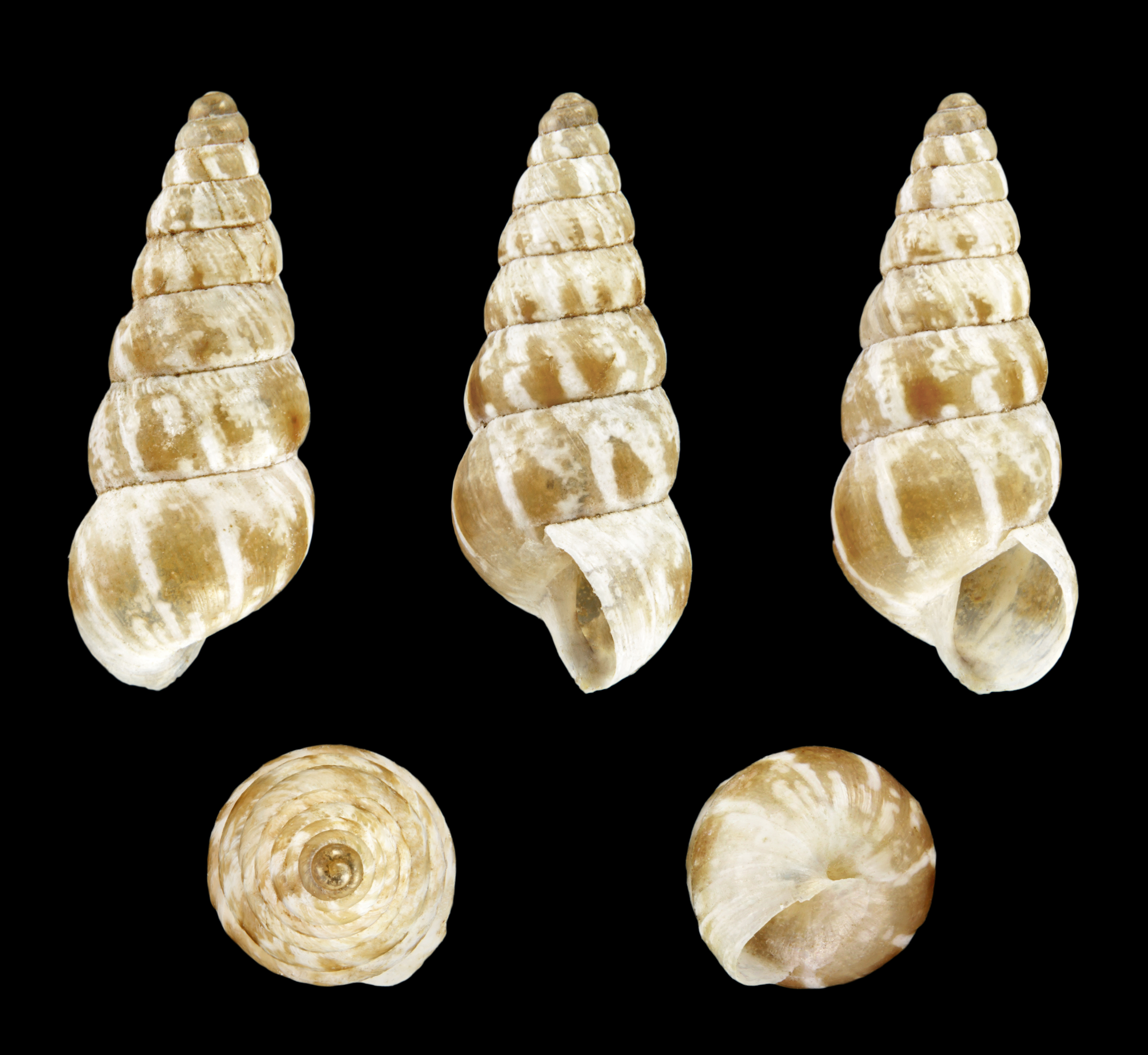
Cochlicella acuta acuta (adult)

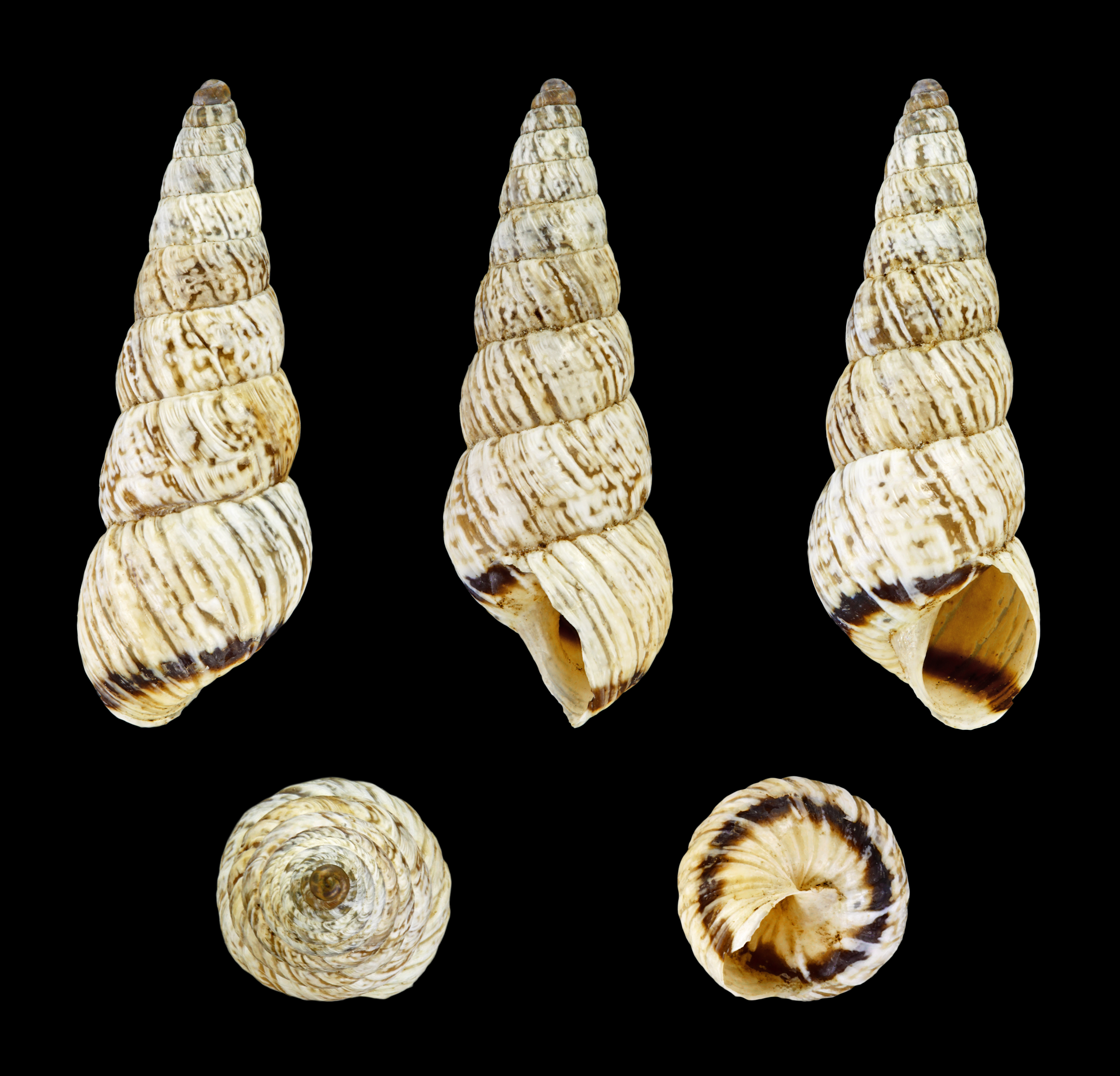
Cochlicella acuta acuta f. gigantea

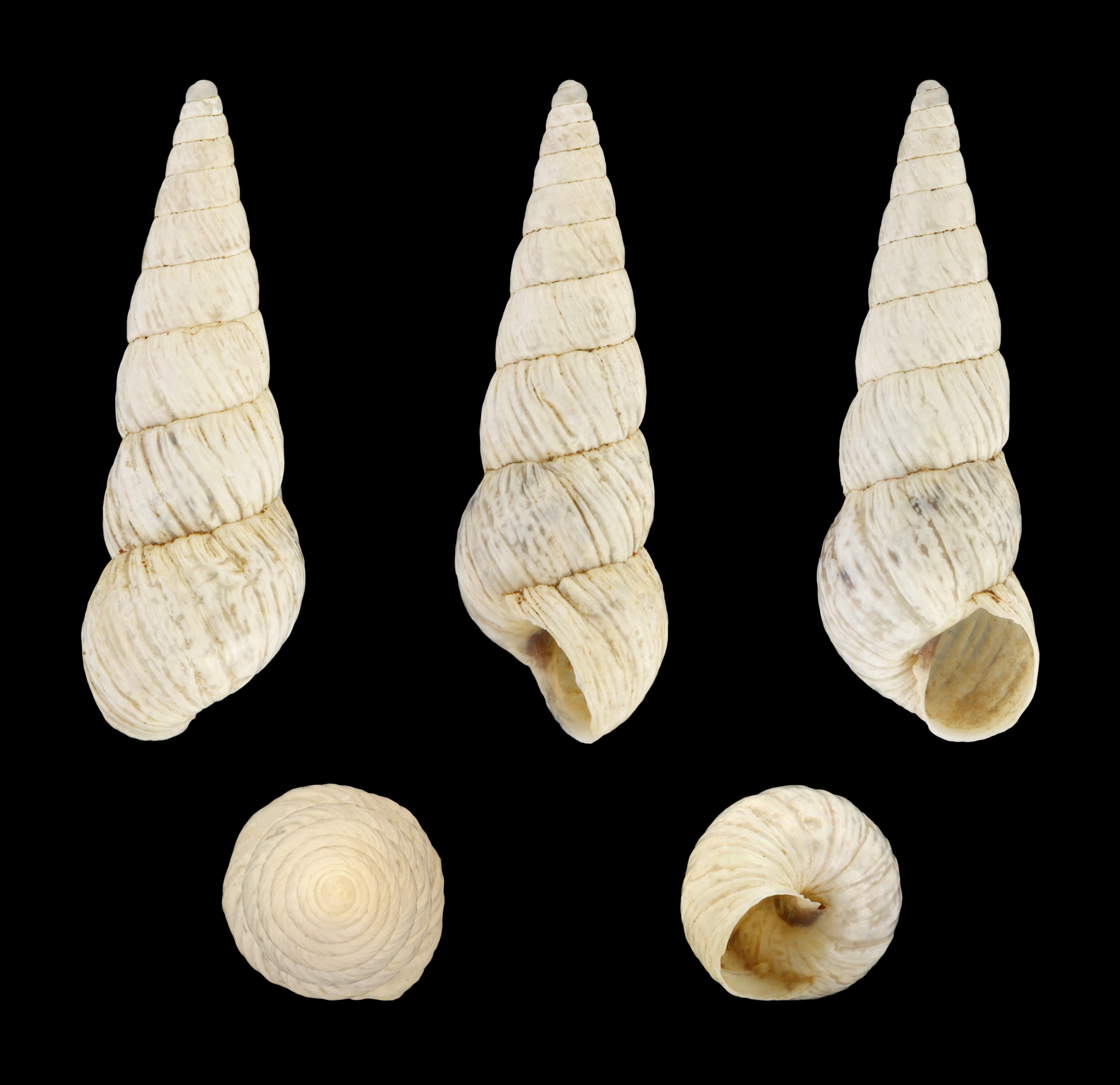
Cochlicella acuta raphidia
(Pale form)

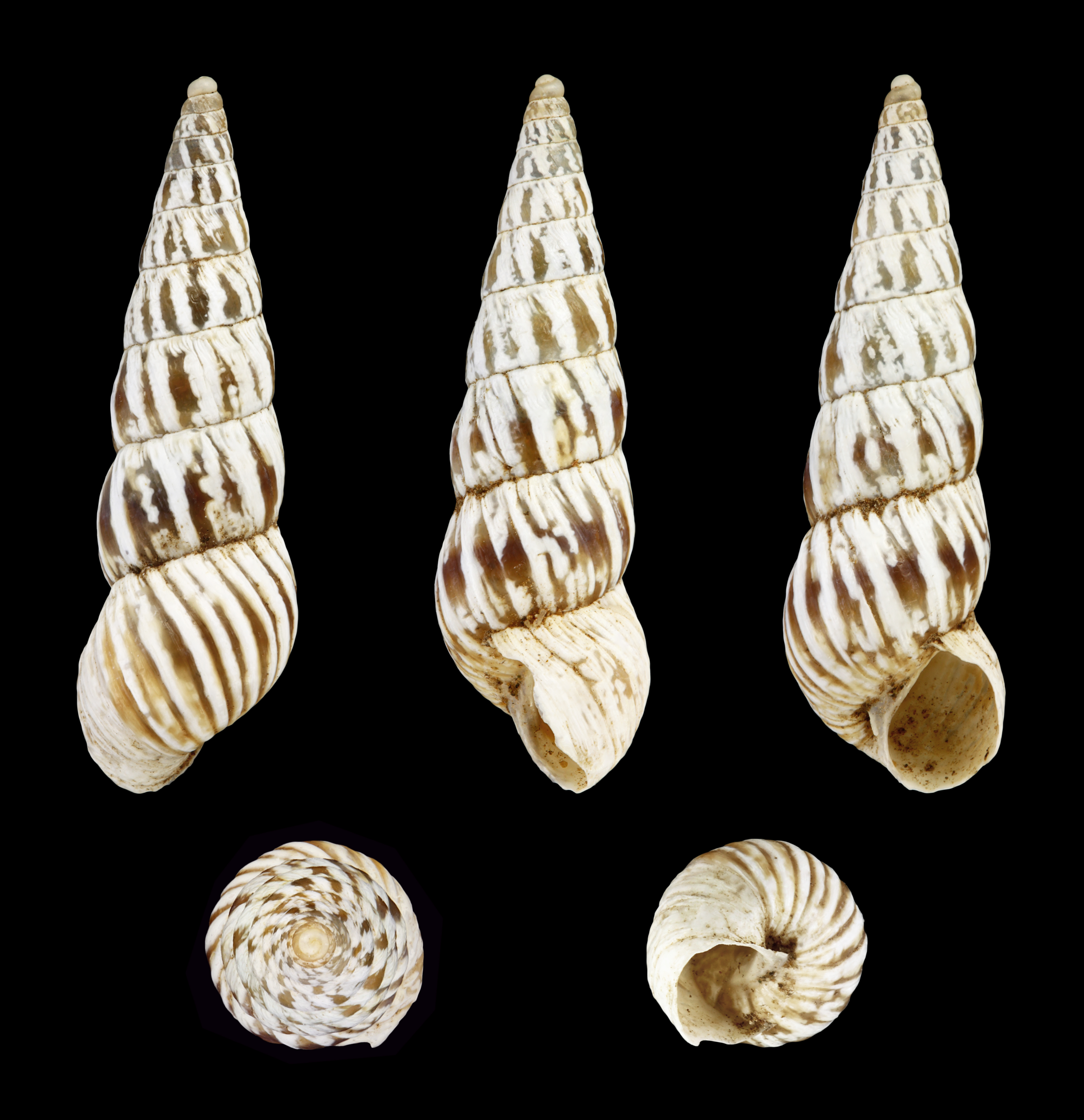
Cochlicella acuta raphidia
(Coloured form)

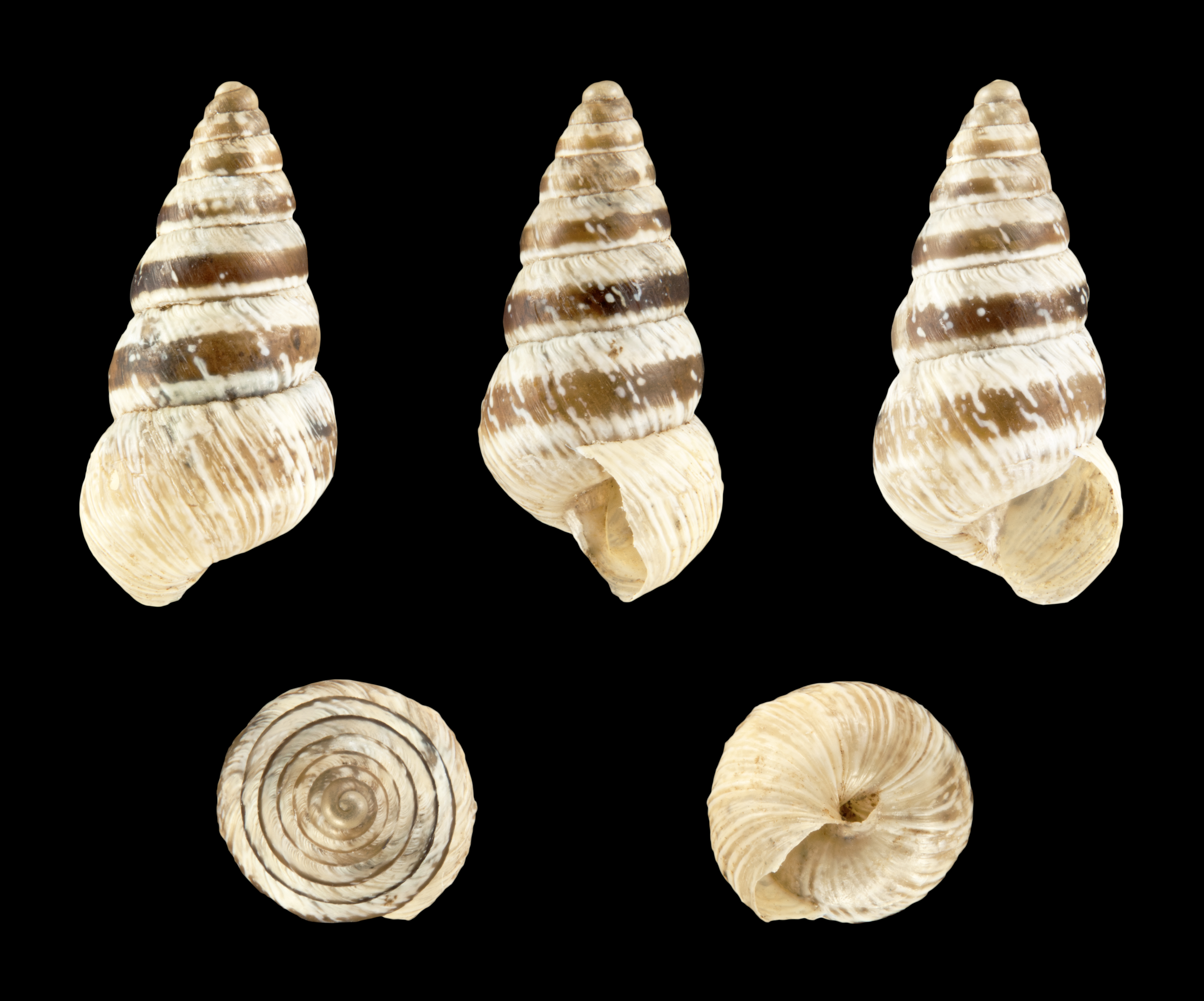
Cochlicella barbara
(Slender form)

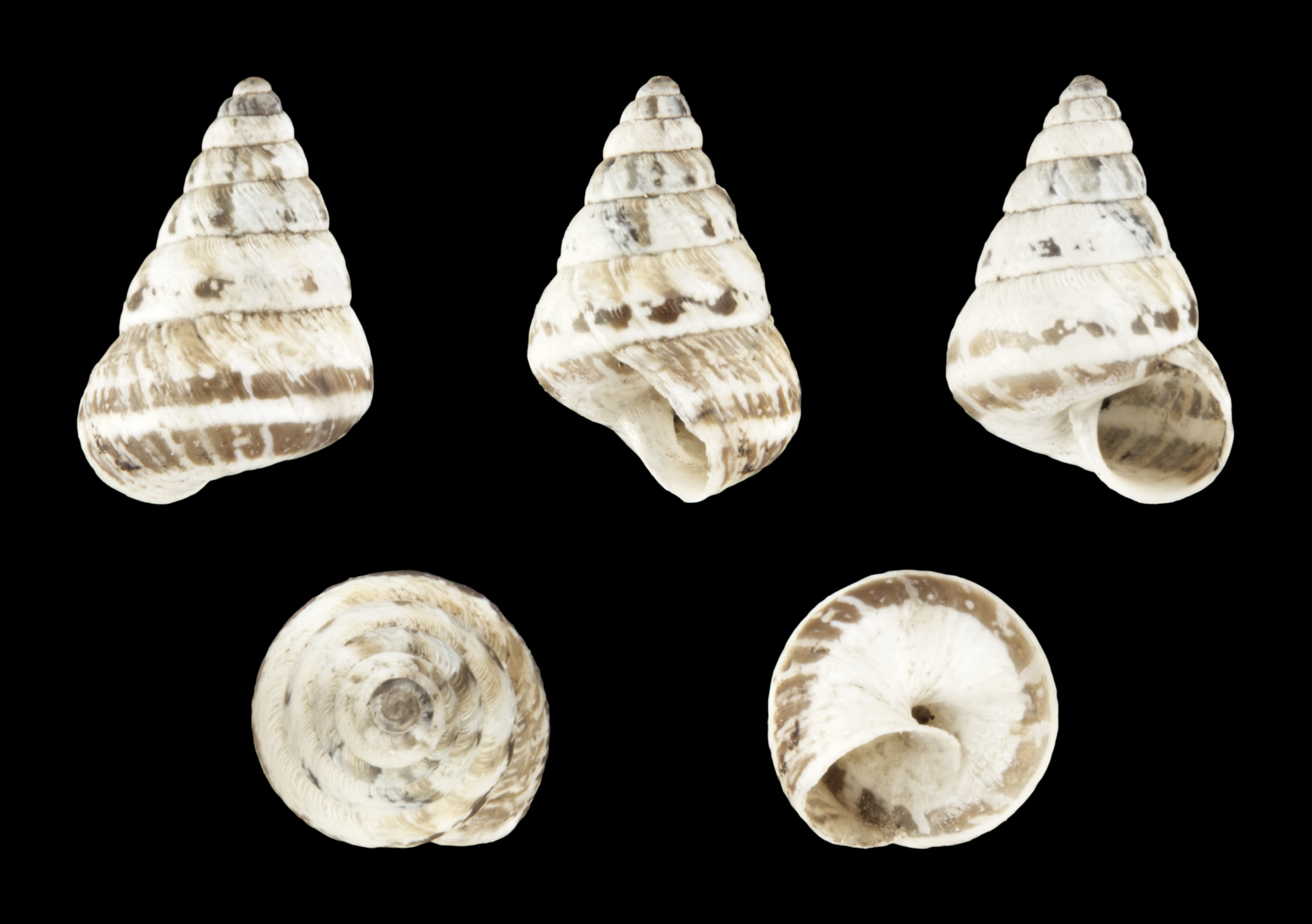
Cochlicella barbara
(Stocky form)
