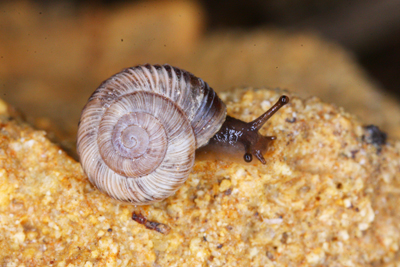
- Living specimen of Helicopsis austriaca in Lower Austria

Conservation status
- Vulnerable (IUCN 3.1)

Scientific classification
- Kingdom: Animalia
- Phylum: Mollusca
- Class: Gastropoda
- Order: Stylommatophora
- Family: Geomitridae
- Genus: Helicopsis
- Species: H. austriaca

Binomial name
- Helicopsis austriaca Gittenberger, 1969

Synonyms
- Helicopsis (Helicopsis) austriaca E. Gittenberger, 1969 (basionym); Helicopsis striata austriaca E. Gittenberger, 1969 (invalid combination)

= Helicopsis austriaca =

Species of gastropod

Helicopsis austriaca is a species of air-breathing land snail, terrestrial pulmonate gastropod mollusc in the family Geomitridae, the hairy snails and their allies.

This species is endemic to Austria.

== Description ==
The right-coiled, semi-globular shell of Helicopsis austriaca is about 2.9-5.2 high and 4.9-8.4 broad, with about 4-4.5 whorls and shows strong ribs. Some individuals, at least 20% of each population, show a slight pronounced keel. The basic colour of the shell is cream-white with some brown colour bands. Like other representatives of the Genus Helicopsis it has four dart sacks, but only two of them contain love darts. The outer shape of the penis resembles a club or ball, the penis itself is very variable in morphology, with partly open penial walls that are occasionally fused with the penis sheath This led to various arrangements of lacunae around the seminal duct. Similar species are H. striata and H. hungarica. The latter one can be unambiguously separated from H. austriaca, as it has bigger shell dimensions. However small shells of H. striata can be confused with those of unkeeled specimens of H. austriaca. In this case a dissection is required, as the internal genital characters of H. austriaca and H. striata are unique for each species.

== Taxonomy ==
H. austriaca was originally described as a new species of Helicopsis, but became later on a subspecies of H. striata. A recent comprehensive survey showed, that both H. austriaca and H. hungarica are not subspecies of H. striata, but separate species. Helicopsis austriaca forms a western subclade within the genus Helicopsis together with both previously mentioned congeners.

== Habitat and protection ==
H. austriaca inhabits two different types of habitat, which represent both primary natural steppe:

- Former river banks in southern parts of the Vienna Basin, characterized by dolomite gravel, where it was described first.
- Boulder fields in the eastern margins of the Northern Calcareous Alps, within natural Austrian pine forests. In this habitat it was discovered recently.

This species occurs only in Lower Austria. Under its former subspecific affiliation Helicopsis striata austriaca it is mentioned in the Annex II of the Habitats Directive.
