= Krynicki (Sas and Korab) =

Sas coat-of-arms

Krynicki (Polish: Kryniccy) is the surname of three Polish noble families of the Sas and Korab coats-of-arms.

== Krynicki (Sas) ==
One Krynicki family of the Sas coat-of-arms is descended from Szandro (Alexander) the Wallachian (Szandro Wołoch) who received the village of Krynica near Lviv (now Stryi Raion, Lviv Oblast) from King Władysław II Jagiełło in 1402. In 1448 King Casimir IV granted knights Daszko (Daniel) and Sienko (Semyon) with the villages of Krynica and Morachwa in Podolia. Their descendants also used the Sas coat-of-arms.

== Krynicki (Korab) ==
Korab coat-of-arms

In 1610 a commoner Jan from Krynica was ennobled by King Sigismund III Vasa with the Korab arms for participation in the war against Muscovy. The origins of the Krynickis of the Korab arms are uncertain. It is believed that Jan Krynicki originated in Krynica-Zdrój. There is a hypothesis that Jan Krynicki was the son of Danko from Miastko (the current village of Tylicz), the first soltys of Krynica, a rich peasant from Wallachia. Nevertheless, Jerzy Krynicki believes he was a burgher. However, Tadeusz M.Trajdos argues there is no certainty as to where Jan Krynicki actually came from. The debate over Jan Krynicki's background is complicated by the fact that in the patent it says his mother hailed from an old Polish noble family, thus a marriage choice for a commoner is questioned. Z. Wąsowicz believes Danko from Miastko was a Polish Catholic instead. Tadeusz Trajdos also points out that there is no record of Jan Krynicki's possible offspring and, thus, no documented connection with the Krynickis who used the Korab coat-of-arms in the 18th century.

== See also ==
- Krynicki (surname)
- Kobyzewicz family
