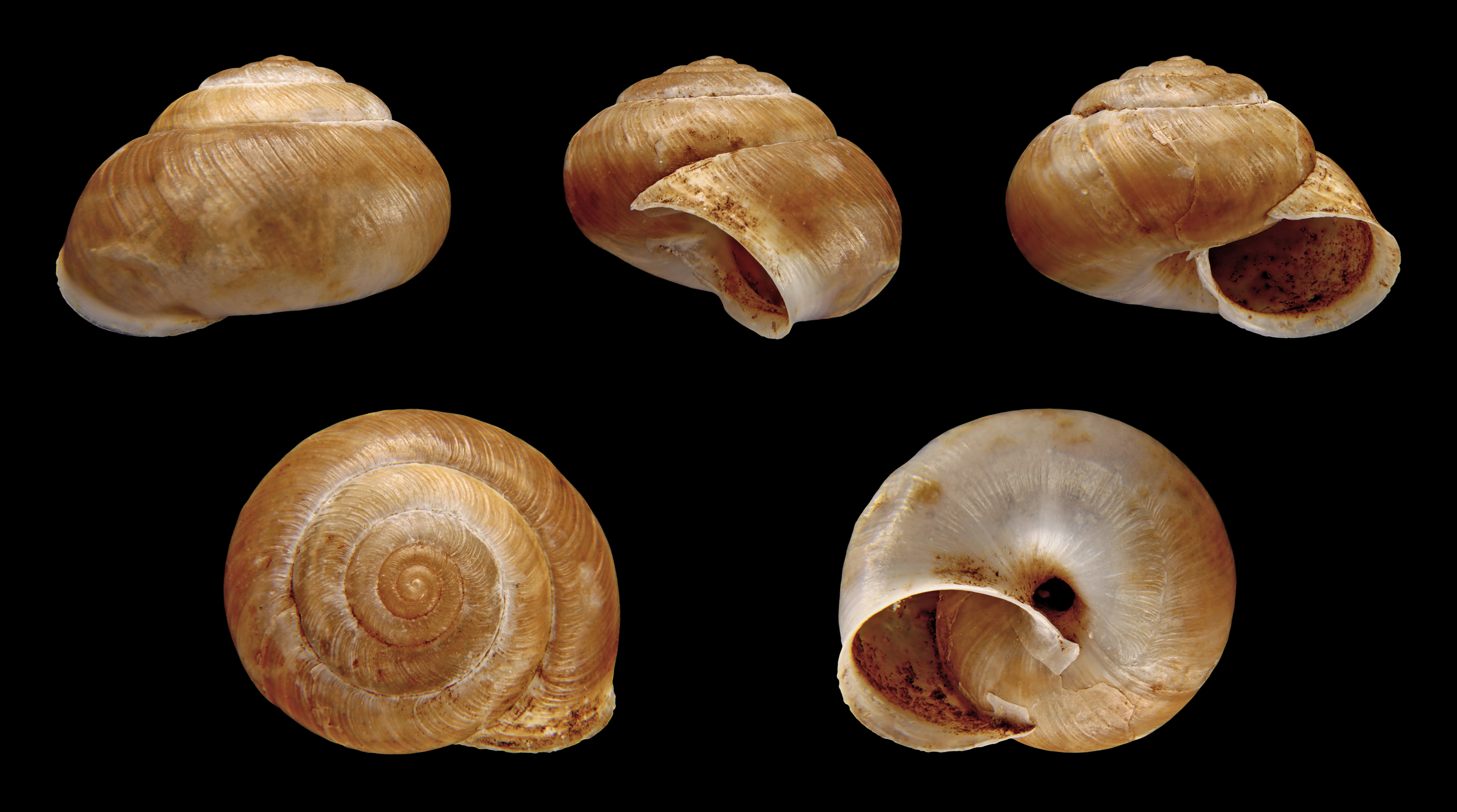
- Metafruticicola redtenbacheri

Scientific classification
- Kingdom: Animalia
- Phylum: Mollusca
- Class: Gastropoda
- Order: Stylommatophora
- Family: Hygromiidae
- Genus: Metafruticicola; Ihering, 1892

= Metafruticicola =

Genus of gastropods

Metafruticicola is a genus of gastropods belonging to the family Hygromiidae.

The species of this genus are found in Mediterranean regions.

Species:

- Metafruticicola andria (E.von Martens, 1889)
- Metafruticicola berytensis (L.Pfeiffer, 1841)
- Metafruticicola coartata Fuchs & Käufel, 1936
- Metafruticicola crassicosta Bank, Gittenberger & Neubert, 2013
- Metafruticicola dedegoelensis Hausdorf, Gümüş & Yıldırım, 2004
- Metafruticicola dictaea (E.von Martens, 1889)
- Metafruticicola genezarethana (Mousson, 1861)
- Metafruticicola hermonensis Forcart, 1981
- Metafruticicola kizildagensis Gümüş & Neubert, 2012
- Metafruticicola maaseni Bank, Gittenberger & Neubert, 2013
- Metafruticicola monticola Bank Gittenberger & Neubert, 2013
- Metafruticicola naxiana (A.Férussac, 1832)
- Metafruticicola nicosiana (Mousson, 1854)
- Metafruticicola noverca (L.Pfeiffer, 1853)
- Metafruticicola occidentalis Subai, 1999
- Metafruticicola oerstani Hausdorf, Gümüş & Yıldırım, 2004
- Metafruticicola ottmari Falkner, 2013
- Metafruticicola pellita (A.Férussac, 1832)
- Metafruticicola pieperi Bank, Gittenberger & Neubert, 2013
- Metafruticicola redtenbacheri (L.Pfeiffer, 1856)
- Metafruticicola rugosissima Bank, Gittenberger & Neubert, 2013
- Metafruticicola schuberti (J.R.Roth, 1839)
- Metafruticicola shileykoi Hudec, 1972
- Metafruticicola sublecta (Maltzan, 1884)
- Metafruticicola uluborluensis Bank, Gittenberger & Neubert, 2013
- Metafruticicola yatagana Schütt, 1985
- Metafruticicola zonella (L.Pfeiffer, 1865)
