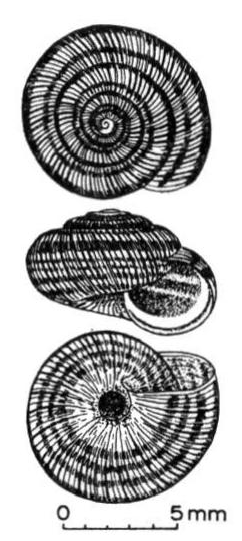
- Drawing of apical, apertural and umbilical view of a shell of Helicopsis striata

Scientific classification
- Kingdom: Animalia
- Phylum: Mollusca
- Class: Gastropoda
- Order: Stylommatophora
- Family: Geomitridae
- Genus: Helicopsis; Fitzinger, 1833

Type species
- Helix striata O. F. Müller, 1774

Diversity
- about 9 species

Synonyms
- Costatella M. Kimakowicz, 1890; Helicella (Striatella) Westerlund, 1876 (junior objective synonym); Helicopsis (Helicopsis) Fitzinger, 1833· accepted, alternate representation; Heliocopsis Fitzinger, 1833 (incorrect subsequent spelling); Martha A. J. Wagner, 1914 (junior synonym); Striatella Westerlund, 1876; Striatinella Clessin, 1876

= Helicopsis =

Genus of gastropods

Helicopsis is a genus of air-breathing land snails, terrestrial pulmonate gastropod mollusks in the subfamily Helicellinae of the family Geomitridae.

== Distribution ==
Distribution of the genus Helicopsis range Central and Eastern Europe to Iran.

== Species ==
The species composition of Helicopsis was largely reviewed after revisions with methods of molecular taxonomy, many of the previously recognized species were shown to be conspecific and many other to be not related with true Helicopsis. After these revisions only 9 or 10 species can be placed into Helicopsis:

- Helicopsis aelleni Hausdorf, 1996 - Northern Iran
- Helicopsis anflousiana (Pallary, 1913)
- Helicopsis austriaca Gittenberger, 1969 - Austria
- Helicopsis buslimiana (Pollonera in Kobelt, 1898) - Libya
- Helicopsis carrossei (Pallary, 1936)
- Helicopsis cereoflava (Bielz, 1851) - Romania, probably a synonym of Helicopsis lunulata
- Helicopsis cypriola (Westerlund, 1889)
- Helicopsis dejecta (Jan, 1832) - Azov Sea
- Helicopsis filimargo (Krynicki, 1833) - Southern and Eastern Ukraine, adjacent regions of Russia, extremely variable, previously treated as several species
- Helicopsis gittenbergeri Hausdorf, 1990 - Greece
- Helicopsis hungarica (Soós & H. Wagner, 1935) - Central Europe and isolated locality in Russia
- Helicopsis larbiana (Pallary, 1928)
- Helicopsis likharevi Schileyko, 1978 - Kopet Dag in Turkmenistan
- Helicopsis lunulata (Krynicki, 1833) - Romania, Moldova, Ukraine, adjacent regions of Russia and probably Poland
- Helicopsis persica Hausdorf & Bössneck, 2016 - Northern Iran
- † Helicopsis phrygostriata (Oppenheim, 1919)
- † Helicopsis piedmontanica Harzhauser, Neubauer & Esu in Harzhauser et al., 2015
- † Helicopsis praecursor (Wenz, 1927)
- Helicopsis striata (O. F. Müller, 1774) - type species, distributed only in Central Europe
- Helicopsis subcalcarata (Nägele, 1903)
- † Helicopsis suevica Gottschick & Wenz, 1927
- Helicopsis teboudensis (Pallary, 1928)
- Helicopsis welschi (Pallary, 1899)
- † Helicopsis wenzi Schütt, 1985

Synonyms that were recognized as species before 21st century:

- Helicopsis altenai Gasull, 1974 accepted as Xerotricha vatonniana (Bourguignat, 1867) (junior synonym)
- Helicopsis arenosa (Krynicki, 1836) accepted as Helicopsis filimargo arenosa (Krynicki, 1836) accepted as Helicopsis filimargo (Krynicki, 1833)
- Helicopsis dejecta (Rossmässler, 1838) - synonym of Helicopsis filimargo
- Helicopsis depulsa (Pintér, 1969): synonym of Xerolenta depulsa (L. Pintér, 1969) (taxon inquirendum)
- Helicopsis gigaxii Haas, 1924 is a synonym of Xerocrassa ripacurcica (Bofill, 1886)
- Helicopsis instabilis (Rossmässler, 1838) - synonym of Helicopsis lunulata
- Helicopsis leptocolpata (Pallary,1923): synonym of Xerosecta leptocolpata (P.M. Pallary, 1923)
- Helicopsis luganica Gural-Sverlova, 2010 accepted as Helicopsis filimargo (Krynicki, 1833) (junior synonym)
- Helicopsis martynovi Gural-Sverlova, 2010 accepted as Helicopsis filimargo (Krynicki, 1833) (junior synonym)
- Helicopsis murcica (A. Schmidt, 1854) accepted as Xerocrassa subrogata (L. Pfeiffer, 1853) (invalid; based on a preoccupied original name)
- Helicopsis paulhessei (Lindholm, 1936) - synonym of Helicopsis filimargo
- Helicopsis retowskii (Clessin, 1883) - synonym of Helicopsis filimargo
- Helicopsis subfilimargo Gural-Sverlova, 2010 accepted as Helicopsis filimargo (Krynicki, 1833) (junior synonym)
- Helicopsis tabulae Chaper, 1855 accepted as Lyrocystis perplicata (Benson, 1851) (synonym)
- Helicopsis turcica (Holten, 1802): synonym of Xeroleuca turcica (Chemnitz, 1795)

Species and synonyms that were placed into Helicopsis, but are not:

- Helicopsis conopsis Morelet, 1876
