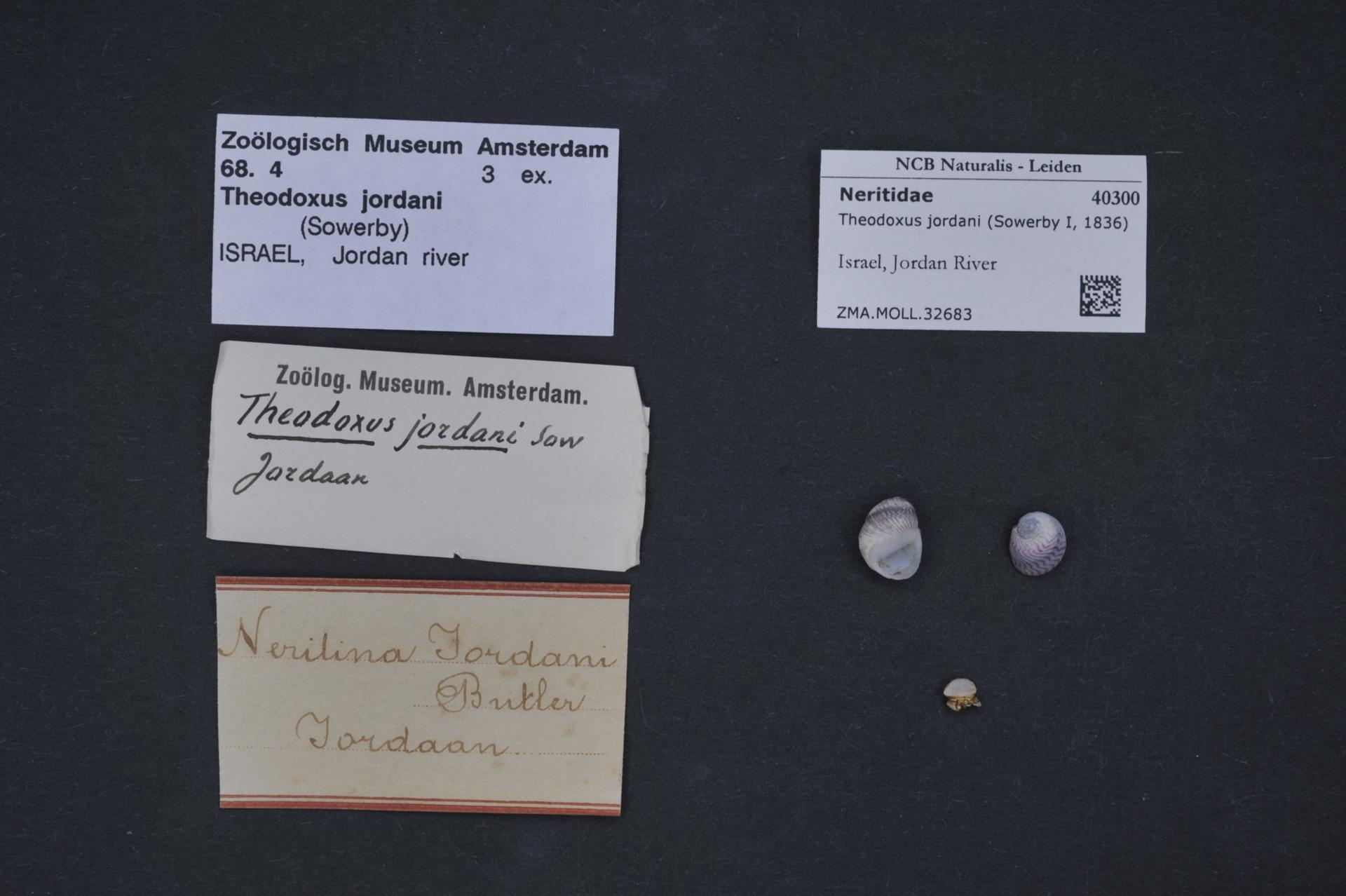

Conservation status
- Least Concern (IUCN 3.1)

Scientific classification
- Kingdom: Animalia
- Phylum: Mollusca
- Class: Gastropoda
- Order: Cycloneritida
- Family: Neritidae
- Genus: Theodoxus
- Species: T. jordani

Binomial name
- Theodoxus jordani (G. B. Sowerby I, 1836) (Note: Various years of description are referred: 1832, 1836, 1844.)

Synonyms
- List: Neritina (Neritaea) gombaulti Pallary, 1939; Neritina (Neritaea) homsensis Pallary, 1939; Neritina (Neritaea) homsensis var. major Pallary, 1939; Neritina (Neritaea) homsensis var. minorPallary, 1939; Neritina (Neritaea) jordani G. B. Sowerby I, 1836; Neritina (Neritaea) jordani var. aberrans Dautzenberg, 1894; Neritina (Neritaea) jordani var. turris Mousson, 1861; Neritina (Neritaea) mesopotamica Mousson, 1874; Neritina (Theodoxia) jordani G. B. Sowerby I, 1836; Neritina (Theodoxia) jordani var. aberrans Dautzenberg, 1894; Neritina anatolica var. mesopotamica E. von Martens, 1874; Neritina bellardii Mousson, 1854; Neritina cinctella Martens, 1874; Neritina elleppenensis G. B. Sowerby II, 1849; Neritina euphratica Mousson, 1874; Neritina jordani G. B. Sowerby I, 1836; Neritina jordani var. turris Mousson, 1861; Neritina karasuna Mousson, 1874; Neritina macrii var. michoni; Neritina meridionalis var. mesopotamica Mousson, 1874; Neritina mesopotamica E. von Martens, 1874; Neritina mesopotamica Mousson, 1874; Neritina michonii Bourguignat, 1852; Neritina nilotica Reeve, 1855; Neritina orontis Blanckenhorn, 1897; Neritina ponsoti Pallary, 1930; Theodoxus (Neritaea) euphraticus (Mousson, 1874); Theodoxus (Neritaea) jordani (G. B. Sowerby I, 1836)·; †Theodoxus (Neritaea) jordani tricarinatus Schütt in Schütt & Ortal, 1993; † Theodoxus (Neritaea) jordani var. bicarinatus Picard, 1934; † Theodoxus (Neritaea) jordani var. unicarinatus Picard, 1934; Theodoxus (Neritaea) octagonus Eichhorst, 2016; † Theodoxus (Neritaea) pliocostulatus Schütt in Schütt & Ortal, 1993; Theodoxus cinctellus (Martens, 1874); Theodoxus euphraticus (Mousson, 1874); Theodoxus niloticus (Reeve, 1855); Theodoxus octagonus Eichhorst, 2016<; Theodoxus orontis (Blanckenhorn, 1897)

= Theodoxus jordani =

Species of gastropod

Theodoxus jordani is a species of freshwater snail with an operculum, an aquatic gastropod mollusk in the family Neritidae, the nerites.

== Distribution ==
This species occurs in:

- Turkey
- Syria
- Lebanon
- Lake Kinneret in Israel
- Palestinian territories
- Yarmouk River in Jordan
- Iraq
- Iran

The type locality is the Jordan Basin.

Shells of this species were also found in Üçağızlı Cave in Turkey, in Upper Paleolithic deposits which probably originated from the Orontes River.

== Parasites ==
Parasites of Theodoxus jordani include two types of trematodes.

== Predators ==
Predators of Theodoxus jordani include:

- fishes Barbus longiceps, Blennius fluviatilis
- crab Potamon potamios
