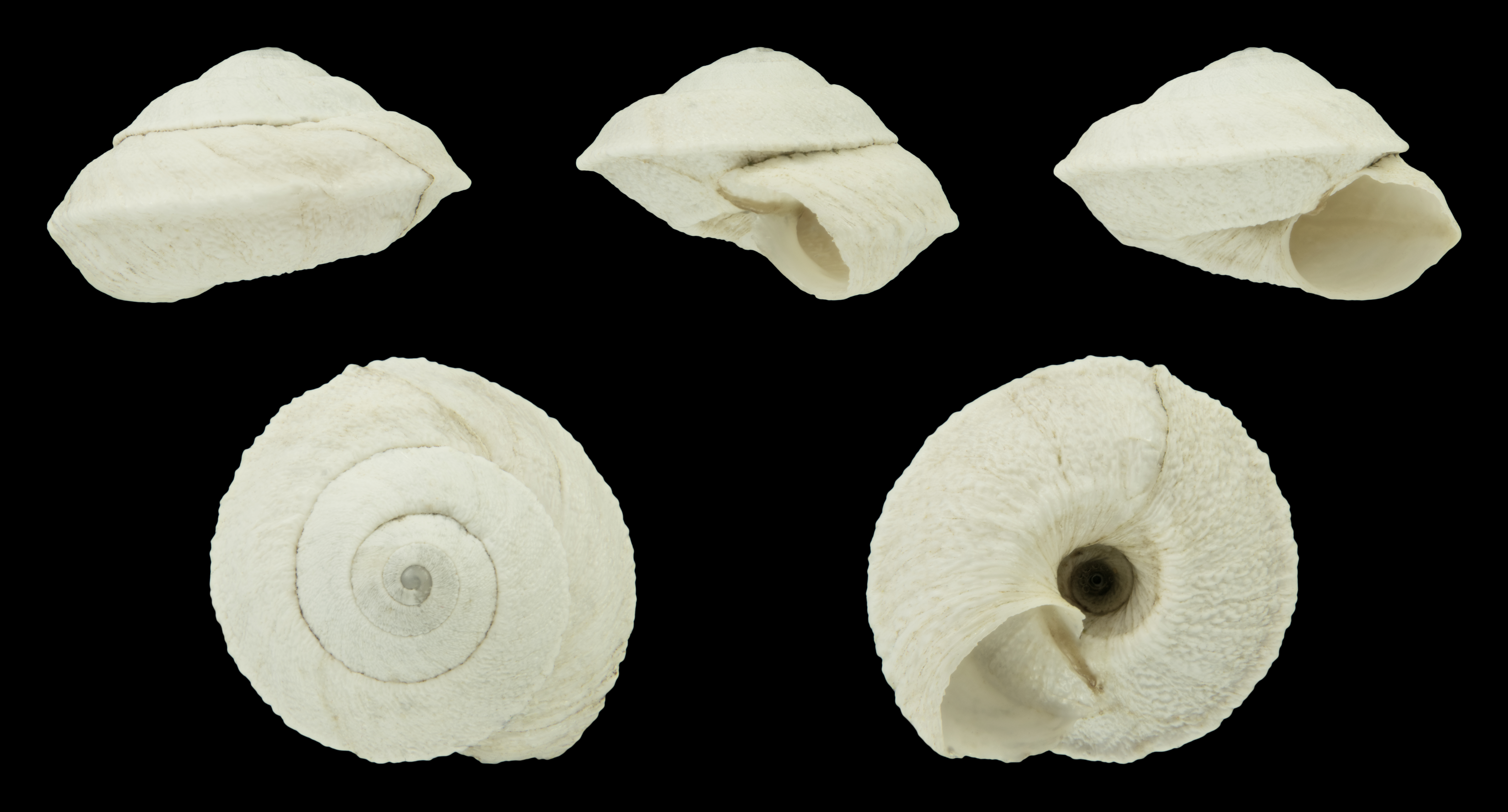

Conservation status
- Near Threatened (IUCN 2.3)

Scientific classification
- Domain: Eukaryota
- Kingdom: Animalia
- Phylum: Mollusca
- Class: Gastropoda
- Order: Stylommatophora
- Family: Geomitridae
- Genus: Helicopsis
- Species: H. conopsis

Binomial name
- Helicopsis conopsis Morelet, 1876

Synonyms
- Helix conopsis Morelet, 1876; Xeroleuca conopsis (Morelet, 1876)

= Helicopsis conopsis =

Species of gastropod

Helicopsis conopsis is a species of air-breathing land snail, terrestrial pulmonate gastropod mollusk in the family Geomitridae, the hairy snails and their allies.

This species is endemic to Morocco.
