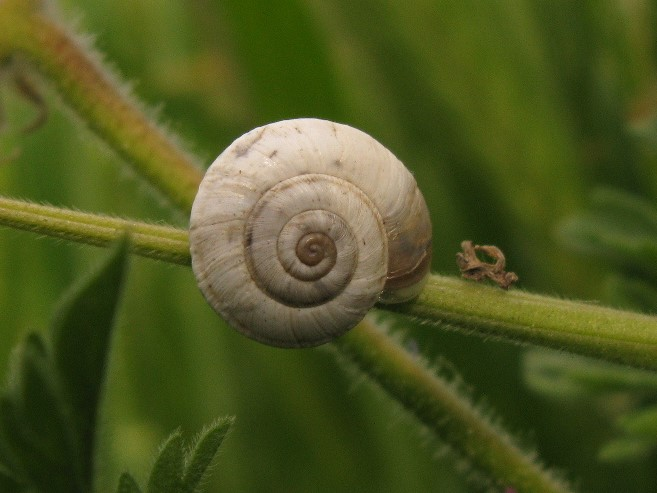

Scientific classification
- Kingdom: Animalia
- Phylum: Mollusca
- Class: Gastropoda
- Order: Stylommatophora
- Superfamily: Helicoidea
- Family: Geomitridae
- Genus: Helicopsis
- Species: H. filimargo

Binomial name
- Helicopsis filimargo (Krynicki, 1833)

Synonyms
- List: Helicella (Jacosta) gireiorum Lindholm, 1926 · (junior synonym); Helicella (Jacosta) lantzi Lindholm, 1926 · (a junior synonym); Helicella paul-hessei Lindholm, 1936 · (original combination); Helicopsis arenosa (Krynicki, 1836); Helicopsis filimargo arenosa (Krynicki, 1836) · (superseded subspecific combination); Helicopsis filimargo filimargo (Krynicki, 1833) · (superseded subspecific combination); Helicopsis luganica Gural-Sverlova, 2010 · (junior synonym); Helicopsis martynovi Gural-Sverlova, 2010 · (junior synonym); Helicopsis paulhessei (Lindholm, 1936) · (junior synonym); Helicopsis retowskii (Clessin, 1883) · (junior synonym); Helicopsis subfilimargo Gural-Sverlova, 2010 · (junior synonym); Helix arenosa Krynicki, 1836 · (junior synonym); Helix dejecta Rossmässler, 1838 · (junior synonym); Helix retowskii Clessin, 1883 · (original combination)

= Helicopsis filimargo =

Species of gastropod

Helicopsis filimargo is a species of air-breathing land snail, terrestrial pulmonate gastropod mollusc in the family Geomitridae from eastern Europe.

== Taxonomy ==
This species is extremely variable and many forms, especially from Crimea, were treated as separate species before a revision using methods of molecular taxonomy was carried out.

== Distribution ==
This species occurs in southern and eastern Ukraine and in the adjacent regions of Russia. Most numerous and diverse populations are in the Crimean Mountains. All reports of H. filimargo outside those regions were referring to various other species of Geomitridae.
