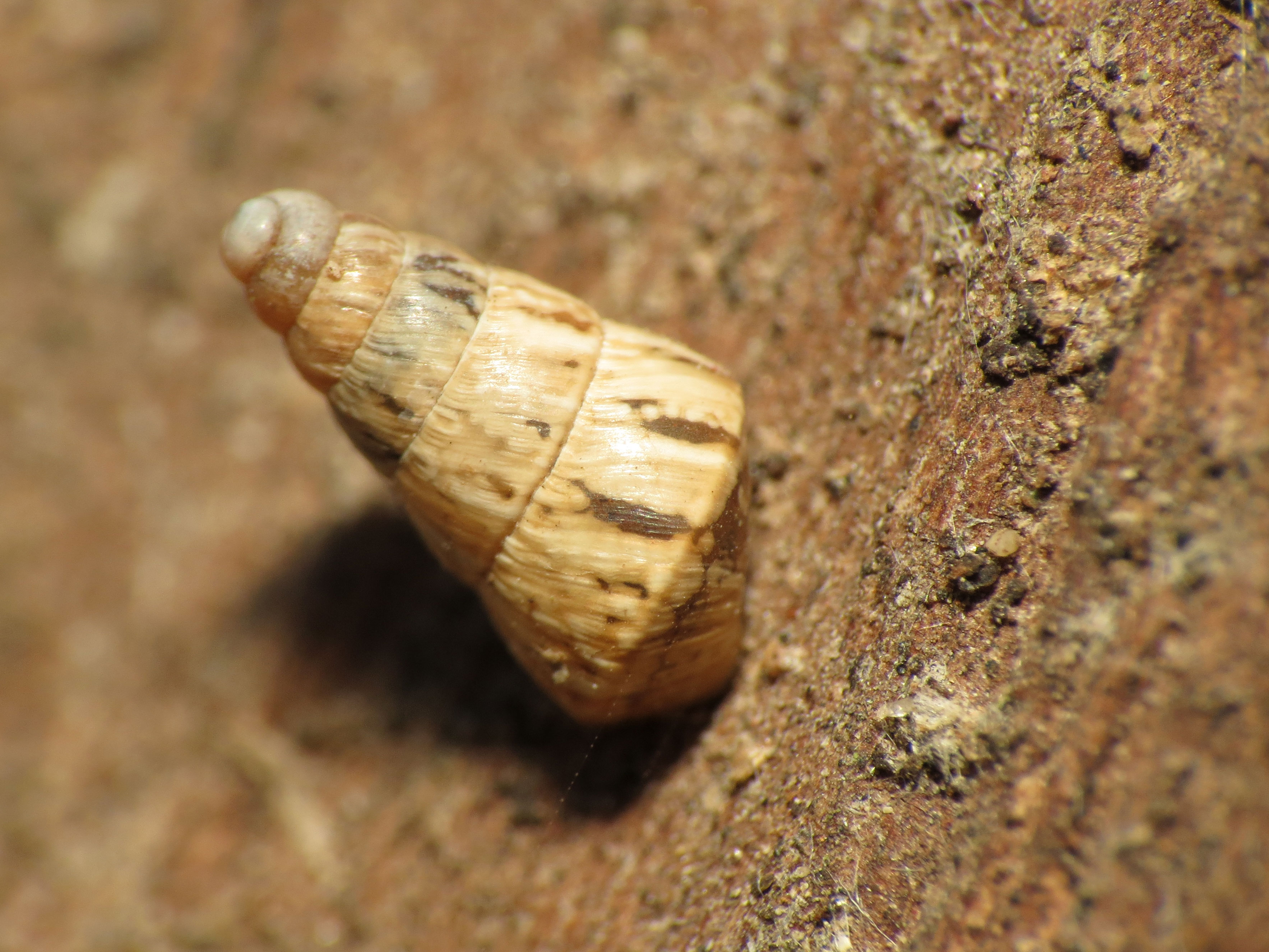

Scientific classification
- Domain: Eukaryota
- Kingdom: Animalia
- Phylum: Mollusca
- Class: Gastropoda
- Order: Stylommatophora
- Family: Geomitridae
- Genus: Cochlicella
- Species: C. acuta

Binomial name
- Cochlicella acuta (O. F. Müller, 1774)

Synonyms
- Cochlicella (Cochlicella) acuta (O. F. Müller, 1774)· accepted, alternate representation; Cochlicella meridionalis Risso, 1826 (junior synonym); Cochlicella turricula Risso, 1826 (junior synonym); Helix acuta O. F. Müller, 1774 (original combination); Helix bifasciata Pulteney, 1799

= Cochlicella acuta =

Species of gastropod

Cochlicella acuta, common name the pointed snail, is a species of small but very high-spired, air-breathing land snail, a pulmonate gastropod mollusk in the family Geomitridae.

== Distribution ==
This species is native to parts of Europe. It inhabits south-western Europe including Spain, Portugal, Italy, and western Europe including France, Belgium, Netherlands and the British Isles.

In the British Isles it lives in dunes, sandhills, and grassy downs close to the sea, chiefly in the south and west of England, Wales, on islands off the west coast of Scotland, and along the Irish coast. It is extremely abundant in some areas.

The species has been introduced in the eastern Mediterranean, including Greece, Israel and Egypt.

It has also been introduced to Australia, where it has become a problematic invasive, or pest species.

=== Habitat ===
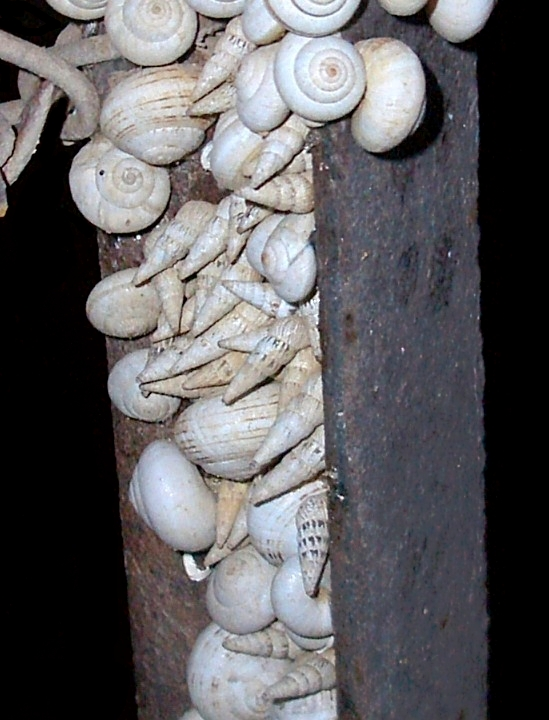
A cluster of Cochlicella acuta (surrounded by larger rounder Theba pisana) aestivating on a fence post in Kadina, Australia.

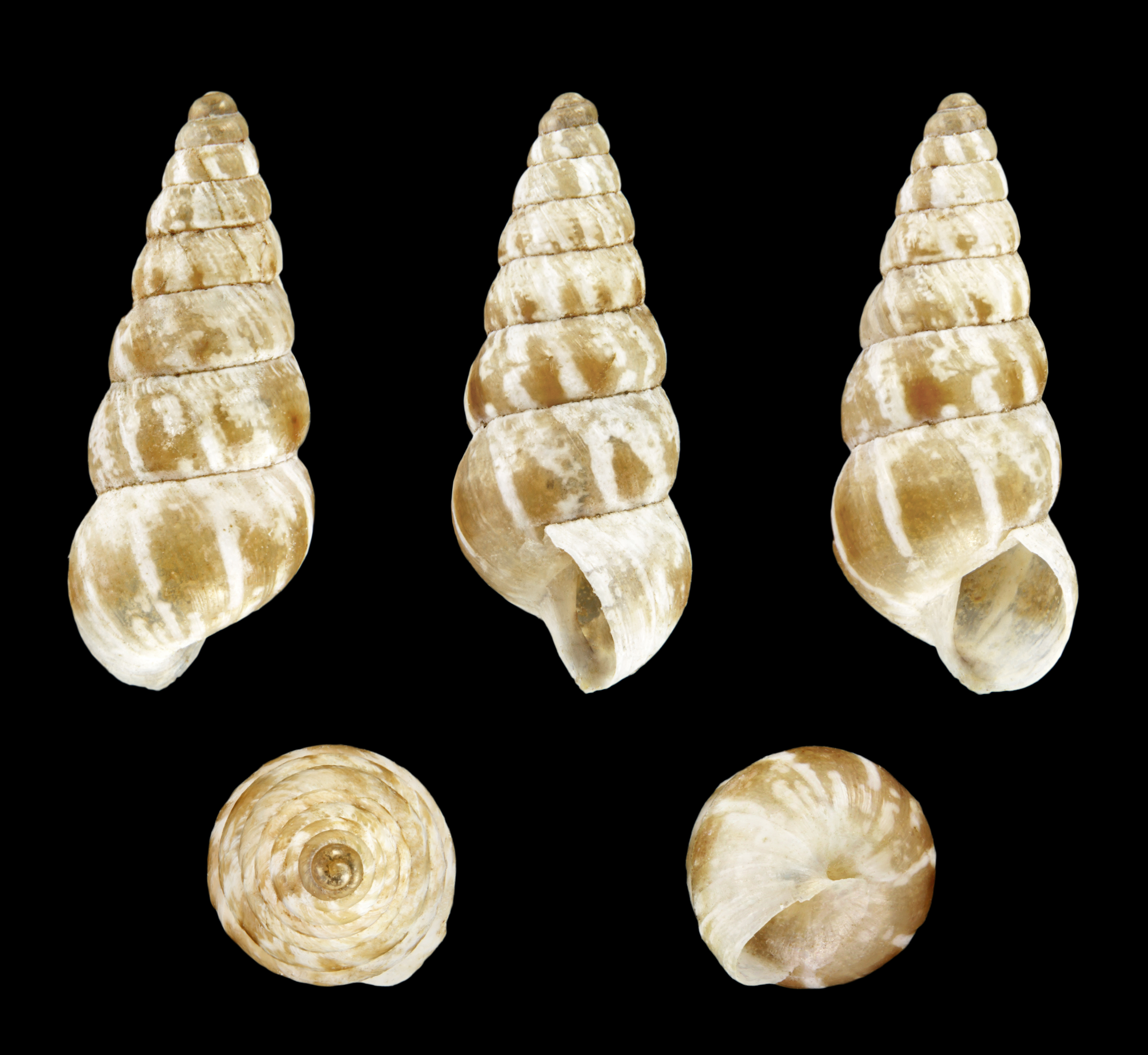
Shell of Cochlicella acuta

This species does well on sandy calcareous soils, and often prefers a coastal setting such as sand dunes. It aestivates by attaching itself to vertical surfaces such as fence posts, tall weeds and so on.

== Shell description ==
The shell of this species is an unusual shape for a helicid, elongatedly conical, 10 to 20 mm high, with a width of only 4 to 7 mm. The spire tapers regularly, but ends in a blunt tip. The oval aperture has a thin lip, and the narrow umbilicus is almost covered.

The shell is very variable in color and markings, often having a cream or off-white background with many pale brown blotches, which are sometimes organized into spiral bands. The shell is often streaked across the whorls with brown. There are sometimes two spiral bands of dark brown or black, which are frequently reduced to only one band, restricted to the body-whorl. Sometimes there are no bands at all.

Welter-Schultes description. For terms see gastropod shell The 9-15 x 4-7 mm shell has 8-11 whorls, in juvenile specimens with a sharp edge. It is evenly white or with brown spots. The shell is less brownish, more slender and higher than the shell of Cochlicella barbara and upper whorls are slightly more rounded in C. acuta (juveniles have a much sharper edge at the periphery of the lowest whorl). The animal is very light yellowish, dorsum with blackish brown pigments, one dark medial line on dorsum, two dark lines (= retractor muscles) from the sides to the upper tentacles.

== Ecology ==
Cochlicella acuta is an intermediate host for the terrestrial trematode parasite Brachylaima cribbi.

== See also ==
- List of invasive species.
