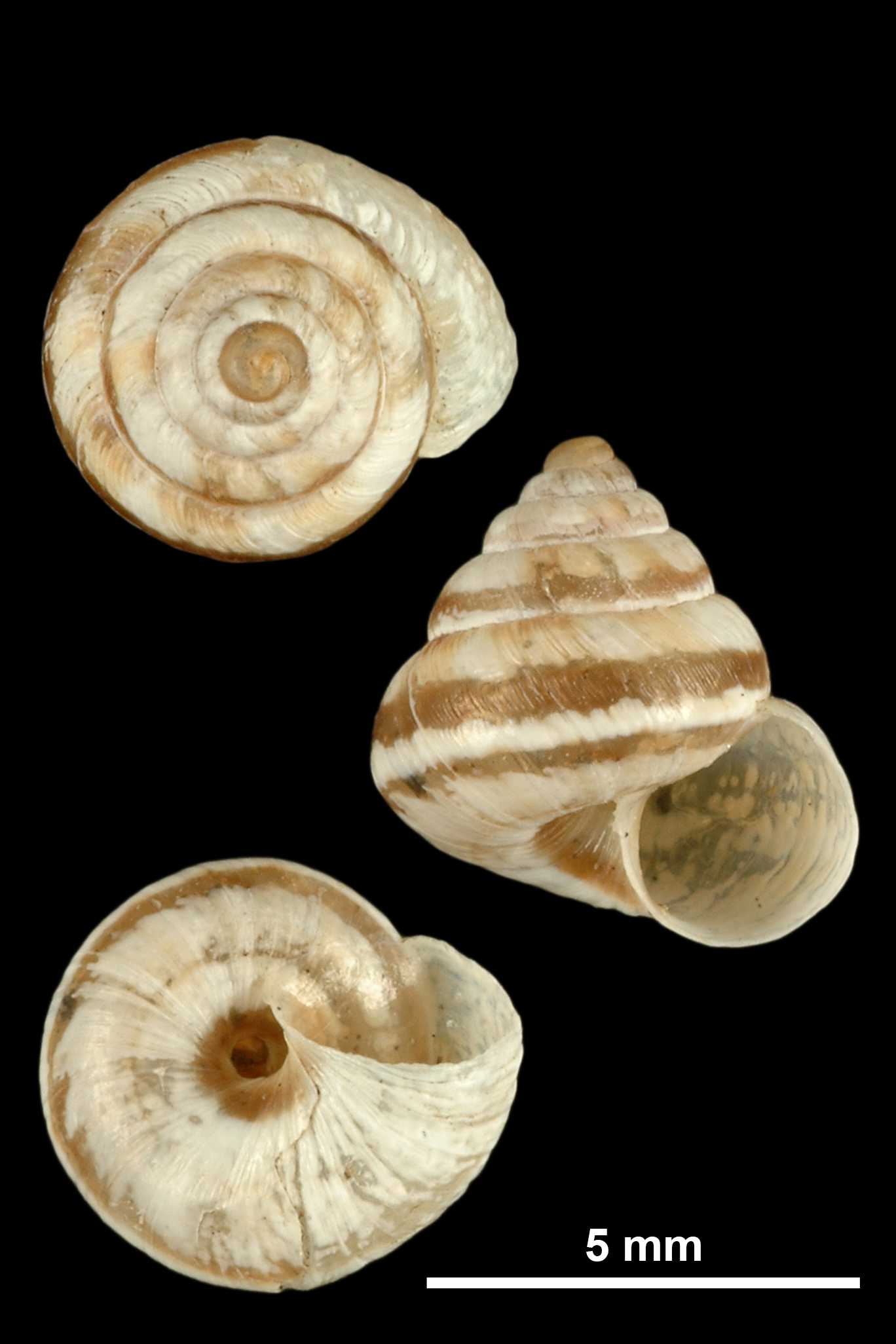

Scientific classification
- Kingdom: Animalia
- Phylum: Mollusca
- Class: Gastropoda
- Order: Stylommatophora
- Family: Geomitridae
- Genus: Cochlicella
- Species: C. conoidea

Binomial name
- Cochlicella conoidea (Draparnaud, 1801)

= Cochlicella conoidea =

Species of gastropod

Cochlicella conoidea is a species of gastropod belonging to the family Geomitridae.

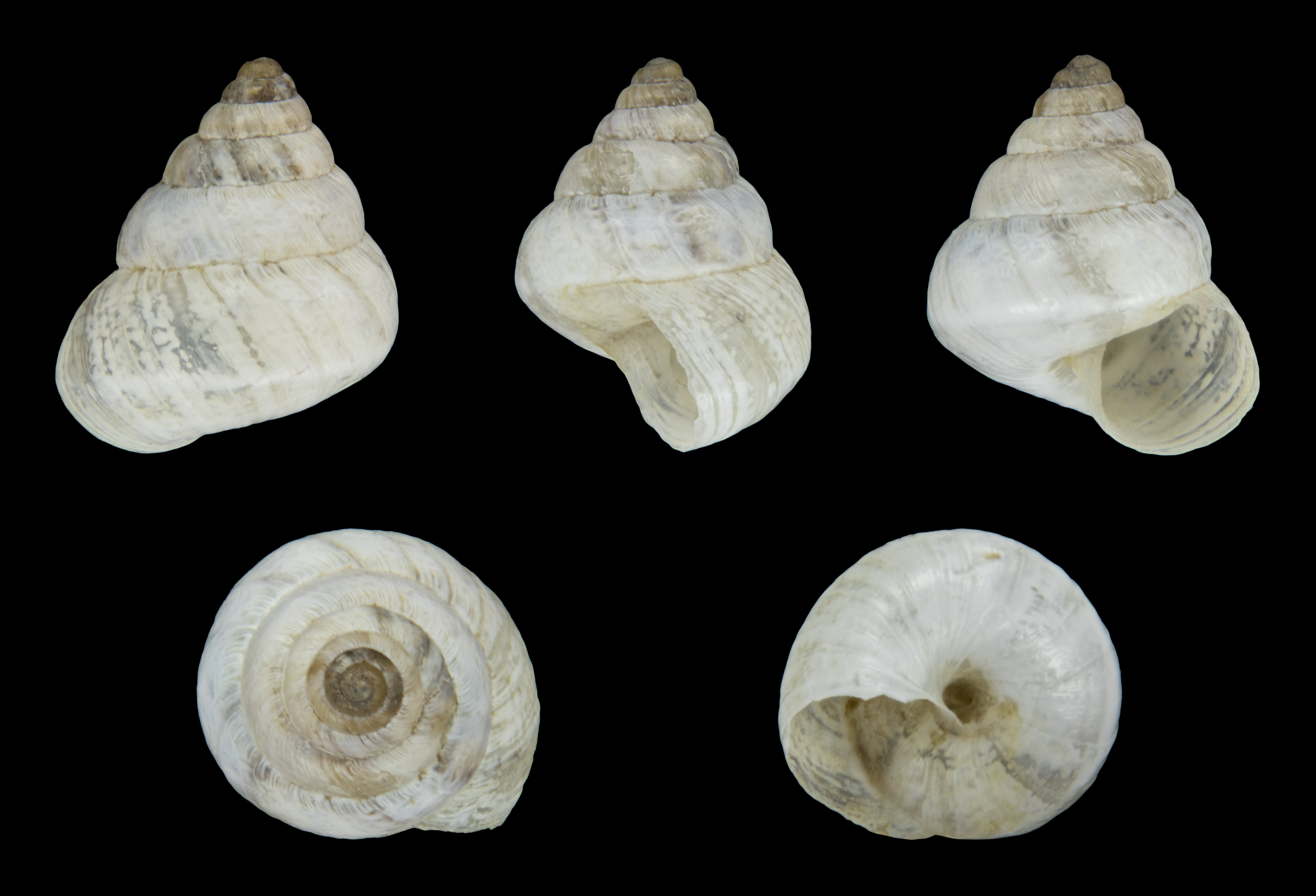
White form

The species is found in western Europe and the Mediterranean.
