= Krynicki =

Krynicki is a surname. Notable people with the surname include:

- Nikifor, also known as Nikifor Krynicki (1895-1968), Lemko naïve painter
- Ryszard Krynicki (born 1943), Polish poet and translator

== See also ==
- Krynicki (Sas and Korab), the surname of three Polish noble families
