= Gyraulus piscinarum =

Conservation status
- Least Concern (IUCN 3.1)

Scientific classification
- Kingdom: Animalia
- Phylum: Mollusca
- Class: Gastropoda
- Superorder: Hygrophila
- Family: Planorbidae
- Genus: Gyraulus
- Species: G. piscinarum

Binomial name
- Gyraulus piscinarum (Bourguignat, 1852)

Synonyms
- Planorbis piscinarum Bourguignat, 1852

Species of gastropod

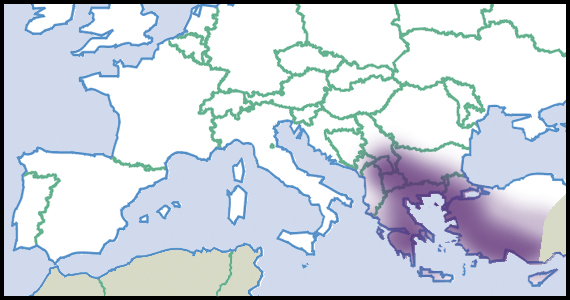
Postulated range in Europe and western Turkey

Gyraulus piscinarum is a species of gastropods belonging to the family Planorbidae.

The species is found in Southeastern Europe (Bulgaria, Turkey) and Western Asia (Turkey, Syria, Lebanon, Israel, Iran). However, the specific range is uncertain because of uncertainty in assigning specific populations to this species.
