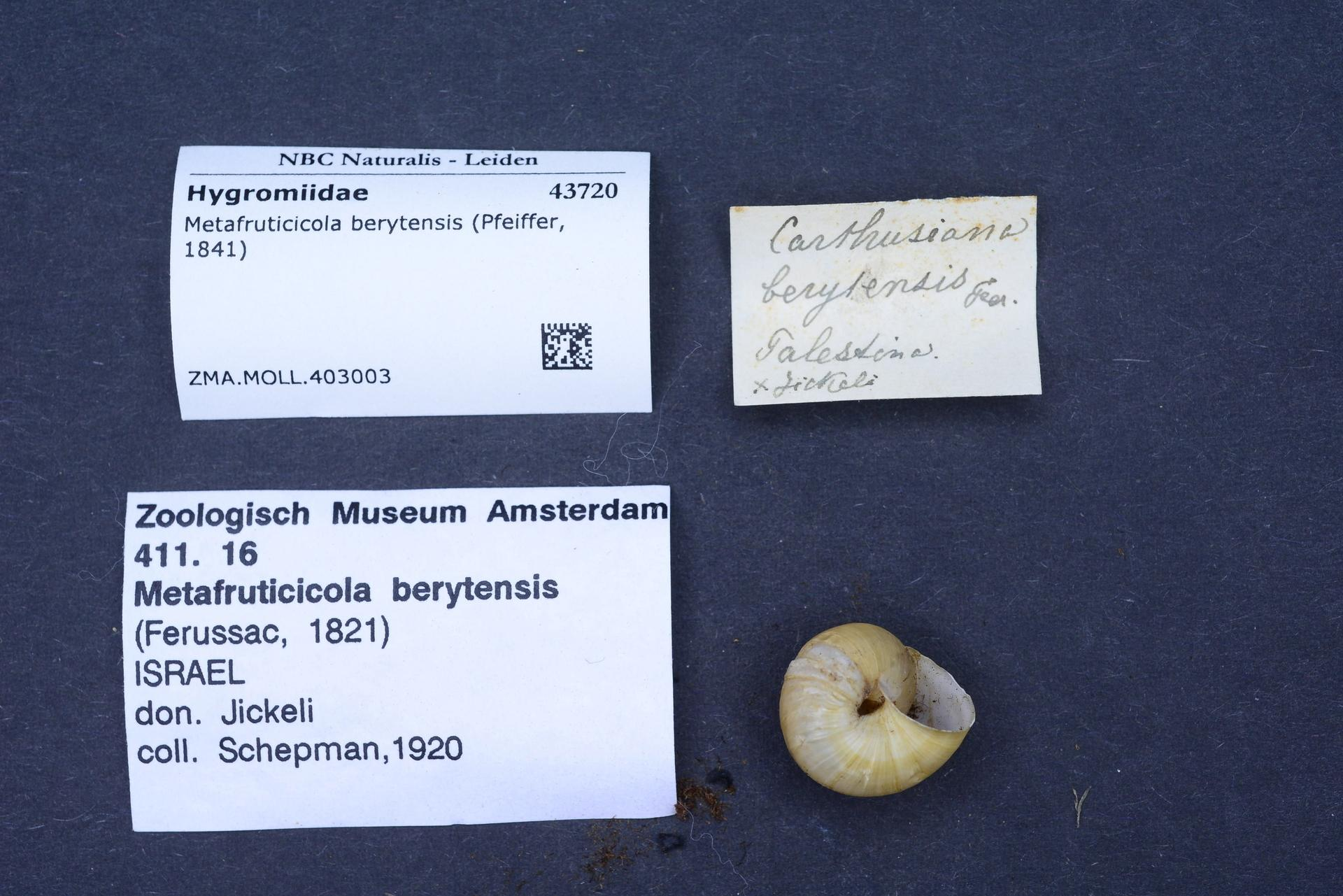

Scientific classification
- Kingdom: Animalia
- Phylum: Mollusca
- Class: Gastropoda
- Order: Stylommatophora
- Family: Hygromiidae
- Genus: Metafruticicola
- Species: M. berytensis

Binomial name
- Metafruticicola berytensis (Pfeiffer, 1841)

= Metafruticicola berytensis =

Species of gastropod

Metafruticicola berytensis is a species of gastropod belonging to the family Hygromiidae.

The species is found in Mediterranean.
