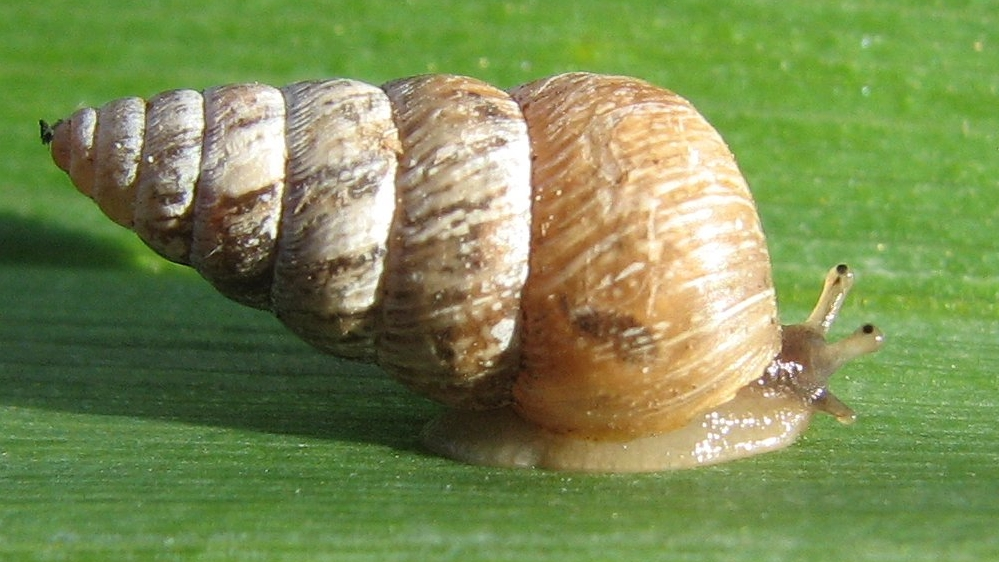
- Cochlicella barbara in NSW, Australia

Conservation status
- Secure (NatureServe)

Scientific classification
- Kingdom: Animalia
- Phylum: Mollusca
- Class: Gastropoda
- Order: Stylommatophora
- Family: Geomitridae
- Genus: Cochlicella
- Species: C. barbara

Binomial name
- Cochlicella barbara (Linnaeus, 1758)

Synonyms
- Bulimus ventricosus Draparnaud, 1801; Cochlicella (Prietocella) barbara (Linnaeus, 1758)· accepted, alternate representation; Cochlicella bulimoides Moquin-Tandon, 1855; Helix (Cochlicella) ventrosa Férussac, 1821; Helix barbara Linnaeus, 1758; Prietocella barbara (Linnaeus, 1758) (invalid combination)

= Cochlicella barbara =

Species of gastropod

Cochlicella barbara, now known as Prietocella barbara, is a species of small but high-spired, air-breathing land snail, a pulmonate gastropod mollusk in the family Geomitridae.

== Distribution ==
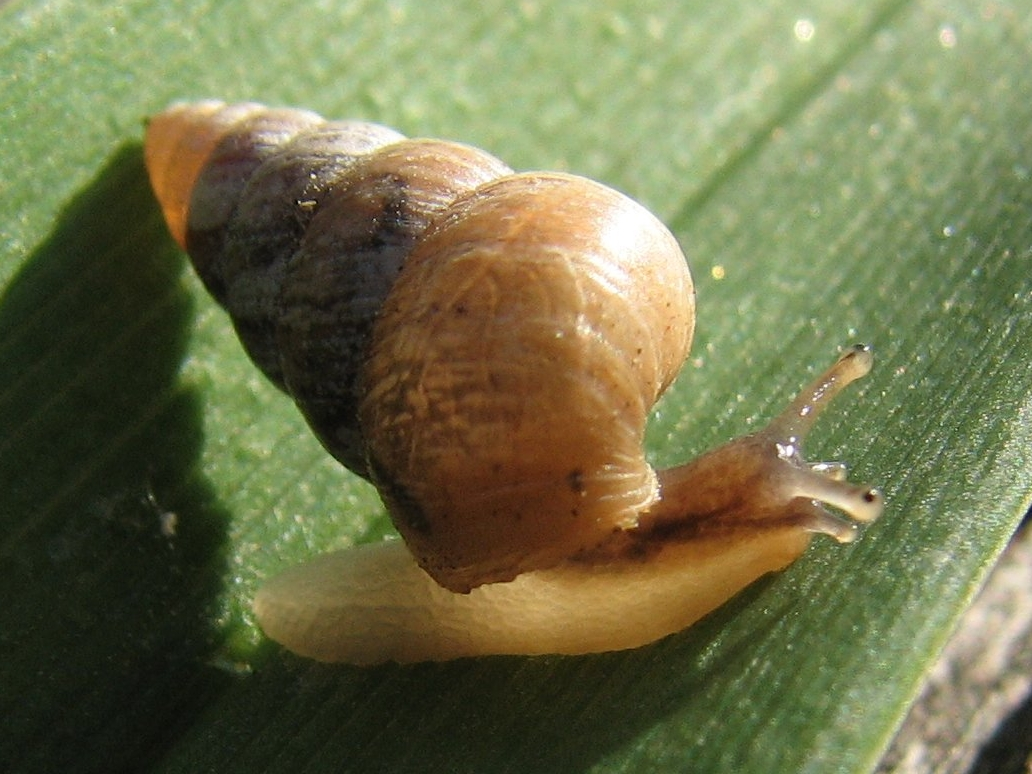
Cochlicella barbara

This species is native to Europe. It occurs, mostly on the coast, from north Portugal to the northwestern Mediterranean area. It has been widely introduced in other countries in the same general area, including England and Wales.

This is also an introduced species in Australia, and South Africa.
