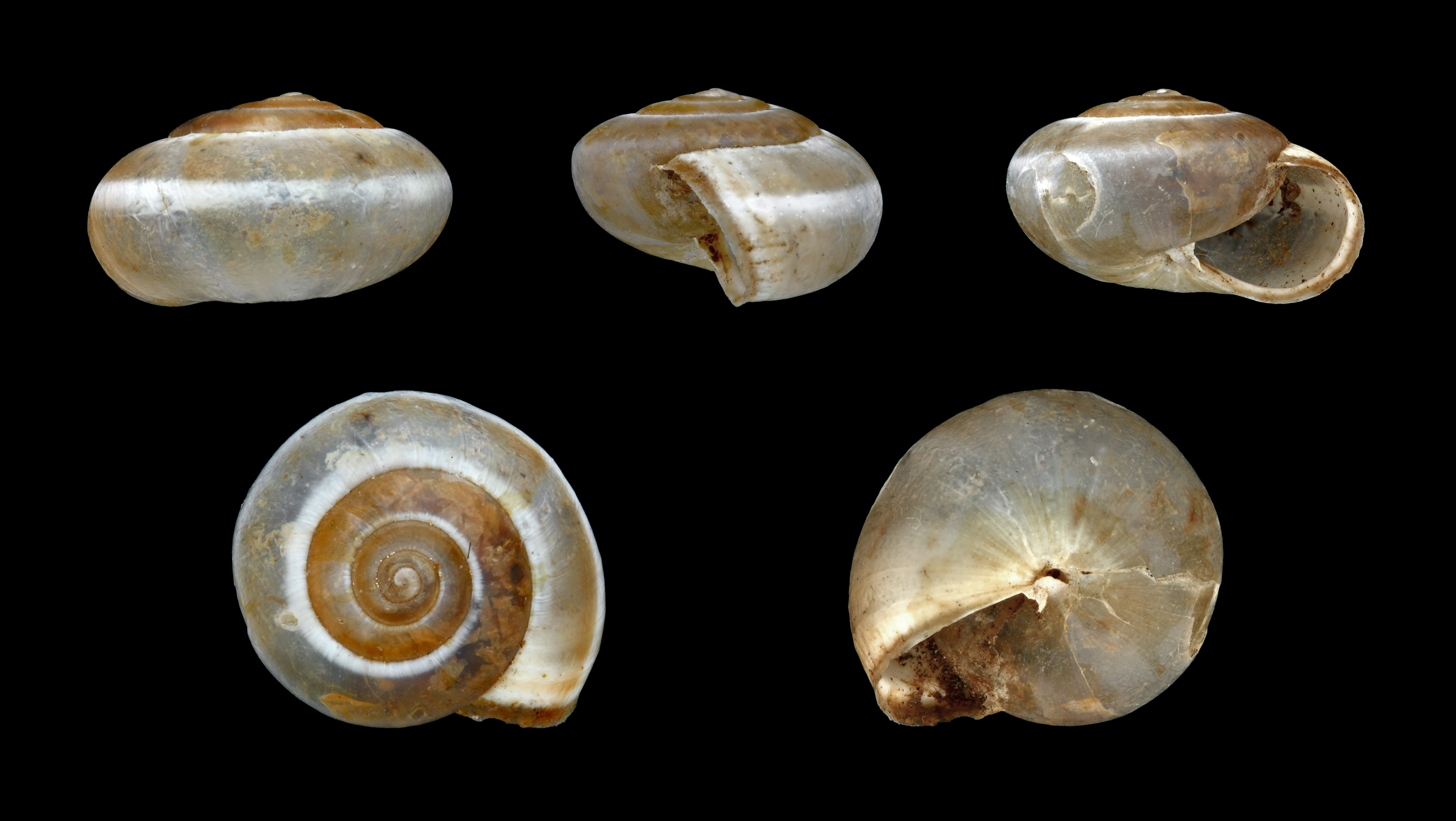

Conservation status
- Secure (NatureServe)

Scientific classification
- Kingdom: Animalia
- Phylum: Mollusca
- Class: Gastropoda
- Order: Stylommatophora
- Family: Hygromiidae
- Genus: Monacha
- Species: M. syriaca

Binomial name
- Monacha syriaca (Ehrenberg, 1831)

= Monacha syriaca =

Species of gastropod

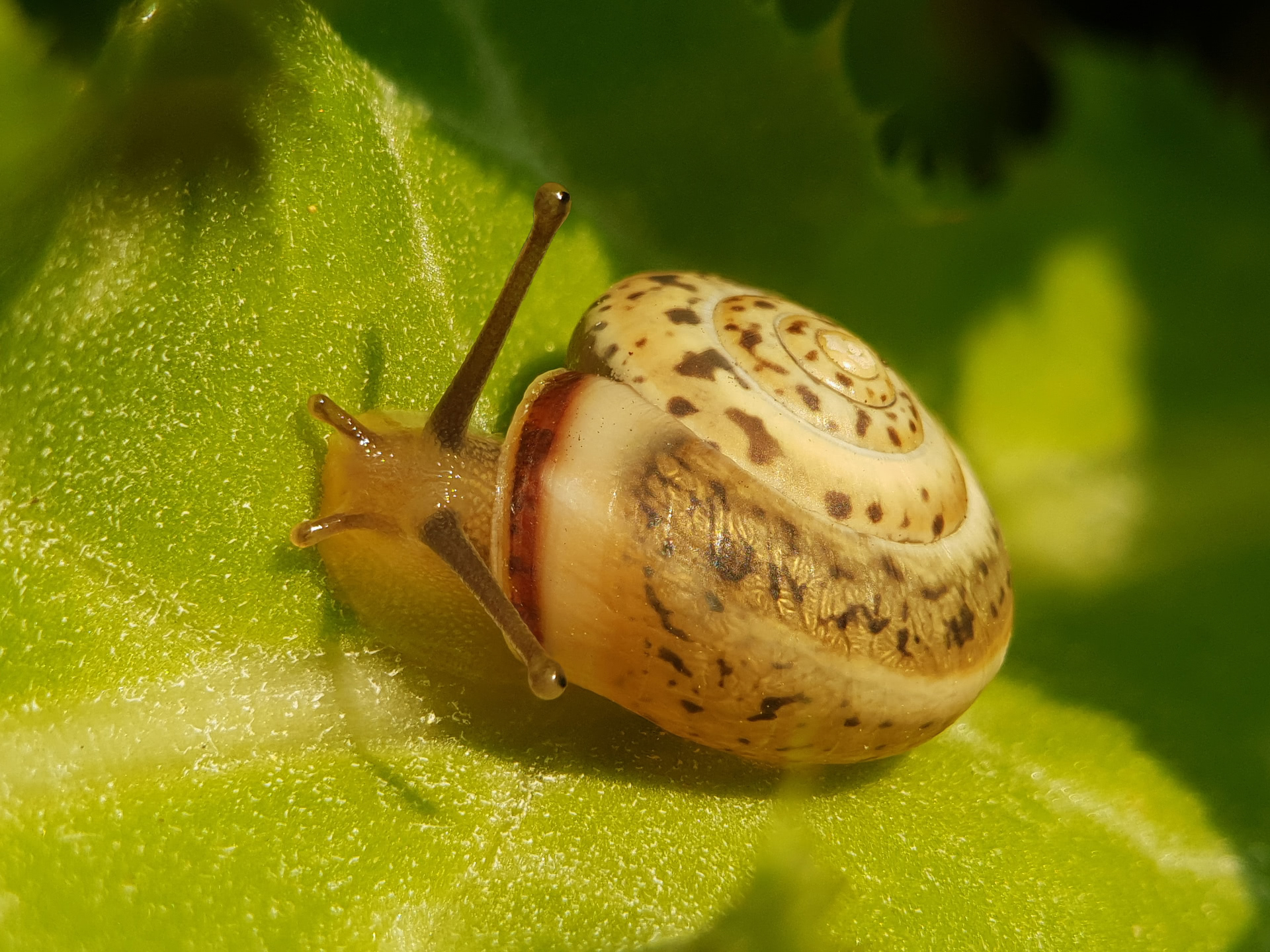

Monacha syriaca is a species of land snail, a terrestrial gastropod in the family Hygromiidae.

The species is found in the Mediterranean area.
