= Ibycus rachelae =

Scientific classification
- Domain: Eukaryota
- Kingdom: Animalia
- Phylum: Mollusca
- Class: Gastropoda
- Order: Stylommatophora
- Family: Helicarionidae
- Genus: Ibycus
- Species: I. rachel

Binomial name
- Ibycus rachel Schilthuizen & Liew, 2008

Species of gastropod

Ibycus rachelae, the long-tailed slug or ninja slug, is a species of air-breathing semi-slugs in the family Helicarionidae.

The common name ninja slug is a result of the ability of the animal to fire "love darts", consisting of calcium carbonate harpoons, at potential mates in order to inject them with hormones. The discoverers initially intended to name the species I. felis from its habit of curling its tail around its neck which looked to them reminiscent of a sleeping cat. But after the love dart behaviour was noticed, they named it I. rachelae instead after Menno Schilthuizen's girlfriend.

Ibycus rachelae is one of well over a hundred new species discovered in Borneo since 2007 and announced in a 2010 World Wide Fund for Nature report.
