= Pachystyla rufozonata =

Conservation status
- Extinct (IUCN 2.3)

Scientific classification
- Kingdom: Animalia
- Phylum: Mollusca
- Class: Gastropoda
- Order: Stylommatophora
- Family: Helicarionidae
- Genus: Pachystyla
- Species: †P. rufozonata

Binomial name
- †Pachystyla rufozonata Adams, 1867

Species of gastropod

Pachystyla rufozonata was a species of small air-breathing land snail, a terrestrial pulmonate gastropod mollusk in the family Euconulidae, the hive snails.

This species was endemic to Mauritius; it is now extinct.
