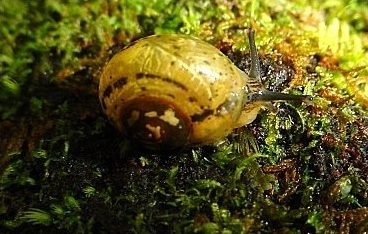
- A live juvenile of Plegma caelatura

Conservation status
- Vulnerable (IUCN 2.3)

Scientific classification
- Kingdom: Animalia
- Phylum: Mollusca
- Class: Gastropoda
- Order: Stylommatophora
- Family: Helicarionidae
- Genus: Plegma
- Species: P. caelatura

Binomial name
- Plegma caelatura (Férussac, 1821)

= Plegma caelatura =

Species of gastropod

Plegma caelatura is a species of small, air-breathing land snail, a terrestrial pulmonate gastropod mollusk in the family Euconulidae. This species is endemic to Réunion.
