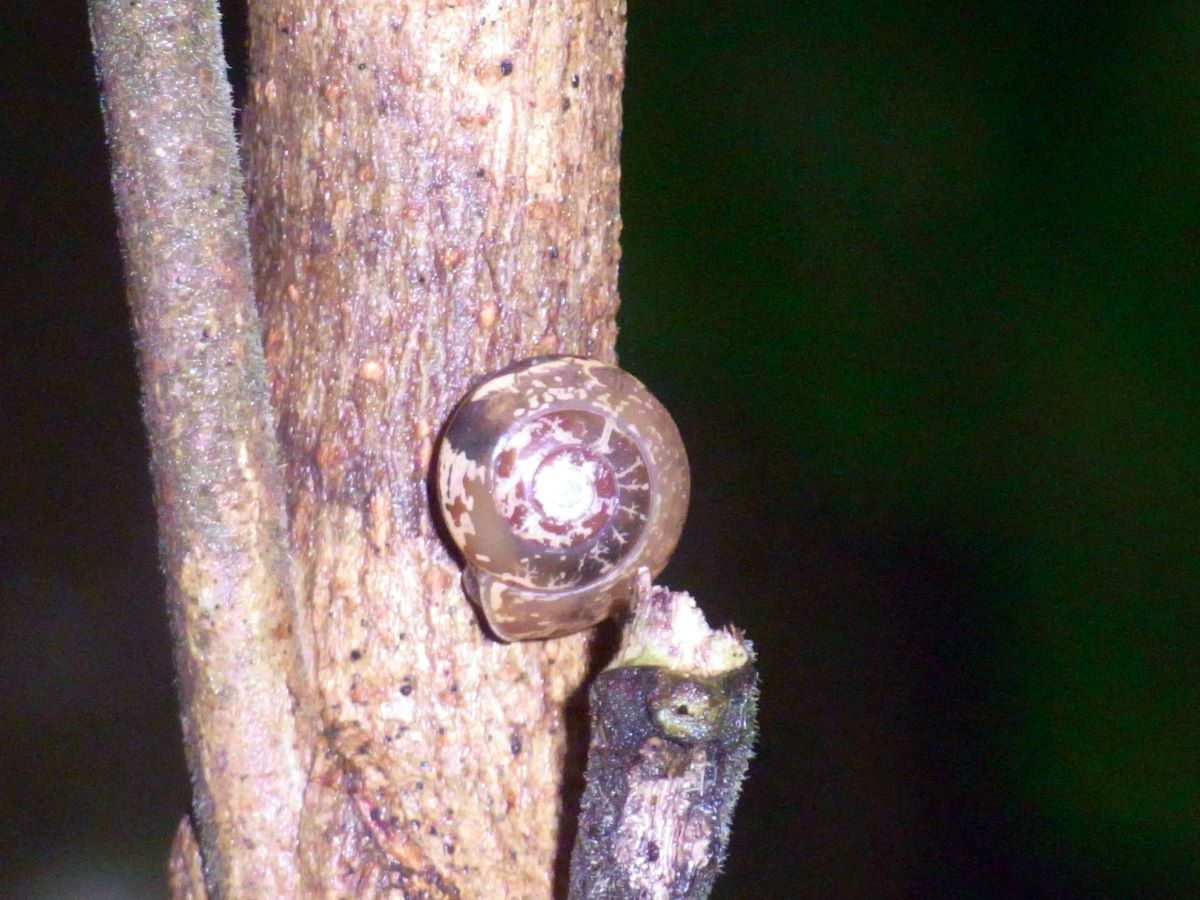
- Nitor medioximus, a rainforest snail, near Dungog, in Australia

Scientific classification
- Kingdom: Animalia
- Phylum: Mollusca
- Class: Gastropoda
- Order: Stylommatophora
- Family: Helicarionidae
- Genus: Nitor
- Species: N. medioximus

Binomial name
- Nitor medioximus Iredale, 1941

= Nitor medioximus =

Species of gastropod

Nitor medioximus is a species of small air-breathing land snail and terrestrial pulmonate gastropod mollusk in the family Helicarionidae. This species is endemic to Australia and grows to about 12 mm in diameter.

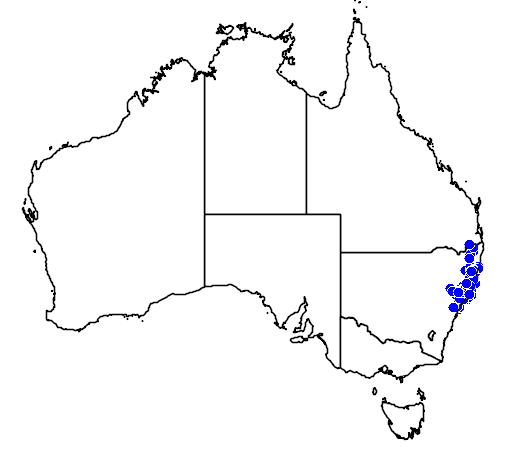
Distribution map of Nitor medioximus
