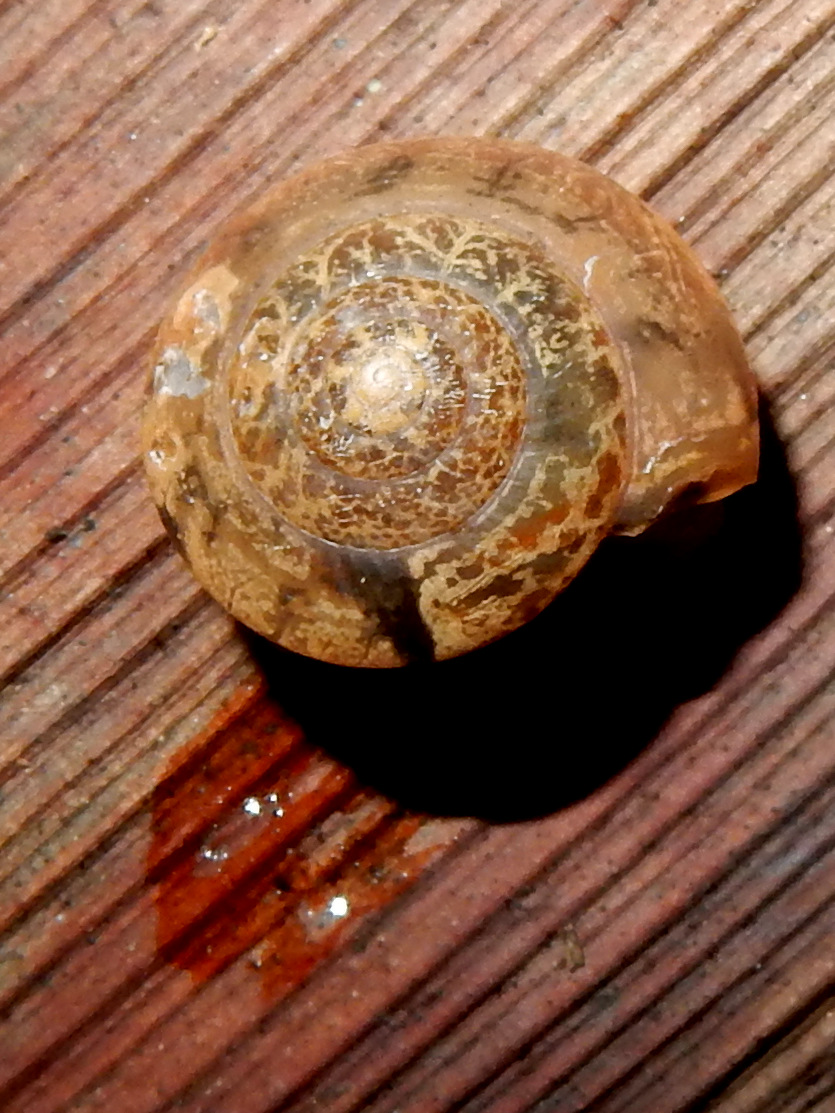
- near Murwillumbah, Australia
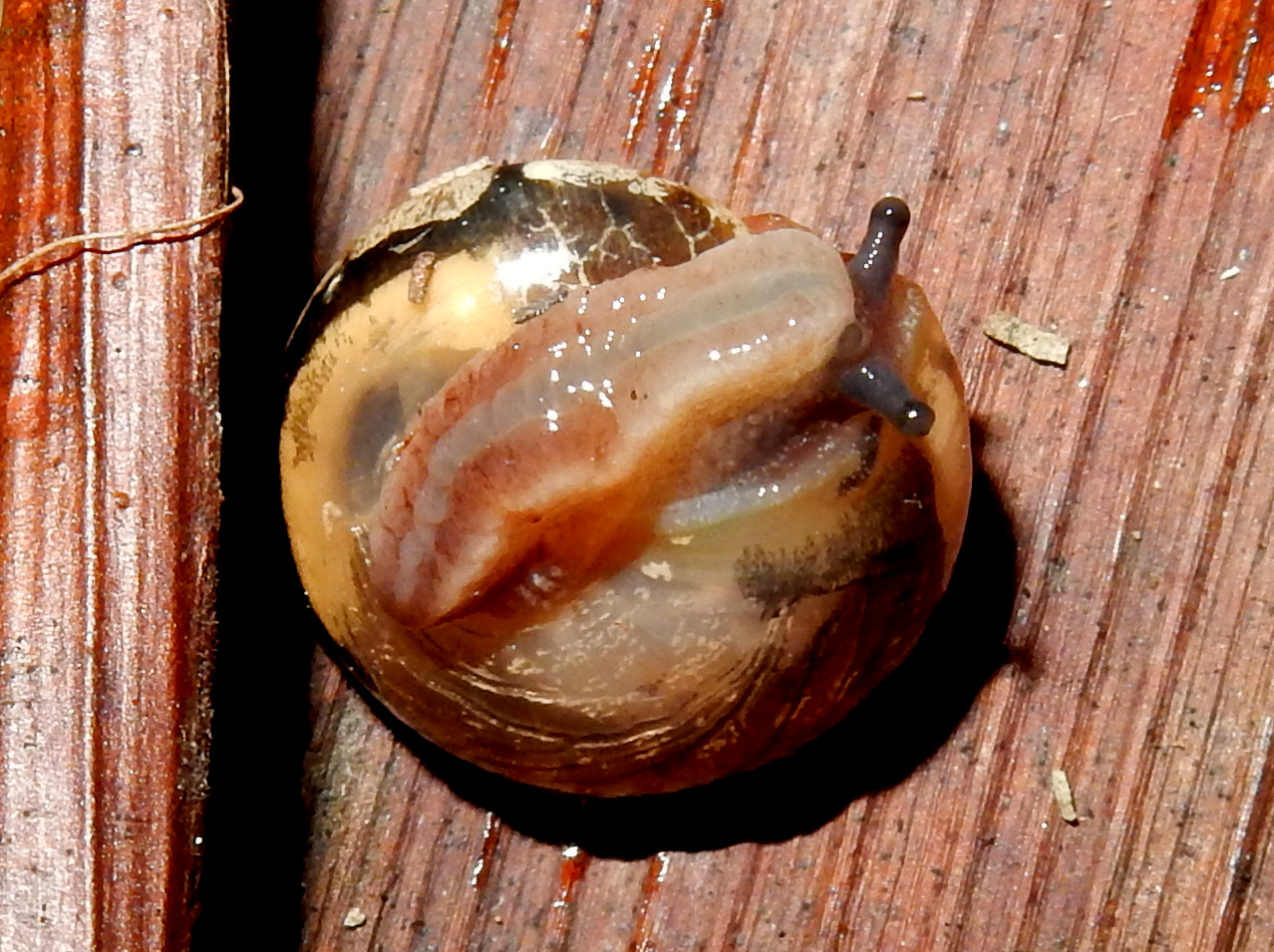

Scientific classification
- Kingdom: Animalia
- Phylum: Mollusca
- Class: Gastropoda
- Order: Stylommatophora
- Family: Helicarionidae
- Genus: Nitor
- Species: N. helmsianus

Binomial name
- Nitor helmsianus Iredale, 1941

= Nitor helmsianus =

Species of gastropod

Nitor helmsianus is a species of small air-breathing land snail, a terrestrial pulmonate gastropod mollusk in the family Helicarionidae. This species is endemic to Australia. It grows to about 12 mm in diameter.
