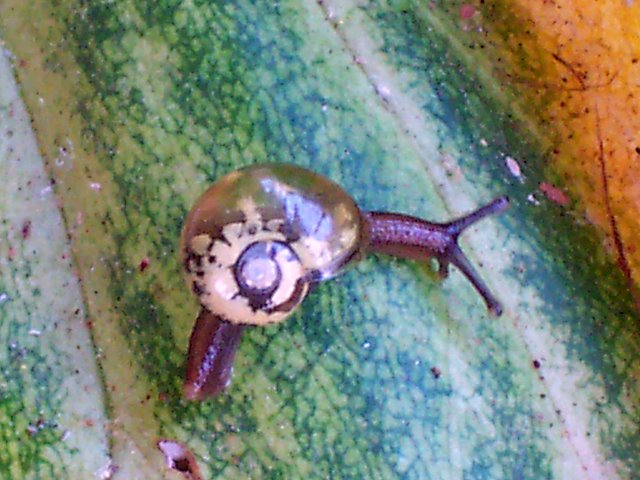
- Mysticarion porrectus from the Tia River, Great Dividing Range, Australia

Conservation status
- Vulnerable (IUCN 2.3)

Scientific classification
- Kingdom: Animalia
- Phylum: Mollusca
- Class: Gastropoda
- Order: Stylommatophora
- Family: Helicarionidae
- Genus: Mysticarion
- Species: M. porrectus

Binomial name
- Mysticarion porrectus Iredale, 1941

Synonyms
- Helicarion porrectus

= Mysticarion porrectus =

Species of snail from Australia

Mysticarion porrectus, also known as Helicarion porrectus, is a tree-dwelling snail in the family Helicarionidae. It is endemic to Australia. This species occurs in and near rainforests at high altitude in eastern Australia. It is associated with Gondwana cool temperate rainforests, with trees such as Antarctic beech, sassafras and pinkwood.

Mysticarion porrectus is found between Mount Dromedary in south east New South Wales up the Great Dividing Range to Mount Superbus, 150 km south west of Brisbane, Queensland

== Description ==
The shell of this snail species is very thin and transparent, so the brightly coloured internal organs are visible through it. The animal has a gland at the end of its tail which is thought to emit pheromones during courtship.

The shell of this Mysticarion species is too small for the soft parts to completely retract into. This gastropod is what is referred to as a "semi-slug": through the course of evolution, the shell has become reduced in size and thickness so that now it mainly offers some protection to the visceral organs. This phenomenon of shell reduction has occurred independently across a number of different families. In some families such as the Athoracophoridae, Cystopeltidae and Limacidae the shell has either completely disappeared or has been so reduced in size as to become a small internal plate – these animals are known as slugs, which are simply snails that have lost their external shell through the course of evolution. It is thought that shell reduction in some families has occurred because of a shortage in calcium carbonate in the local rocks or soil; this calcium carbonate is needed by snails to manufacture their shells.

In the Helicarionidae, shell types range across almost the whole spectrum, from species with large, fully formed shells they can withdraw back into, to those with very reduced ear-shaped or plate-like shells that are partly or almost completely internal, and which sit on their backs like a saddle.

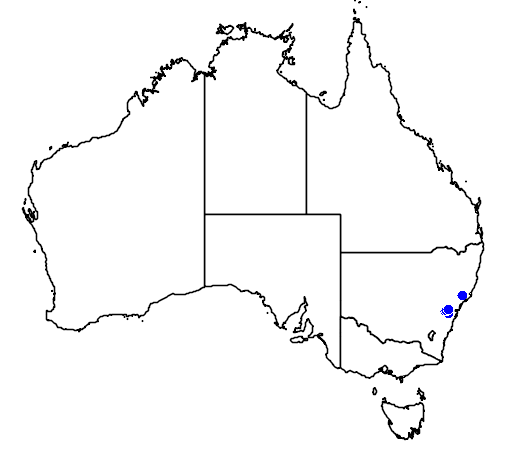
Distribution map of Mysticarion porrectus

== Ecology ==
This species is thought to be a herbivore which scrapes biofilm such as algae and sooty mould off the surface of living leaves.

The snail often rests on leaves of shrubs and saplings, and also on the trunks of larger trees. It usually rests on its side, with the end part of its tail curved back. This tail area can act as a suction cup and because of the snail's habit of resting on leaves, these animals can be accidentally and unknowingly picked up by other animals, or even by cars and human beings, that brush against the foliage. Most arboreal snails have very sticky mucus, and this "hitchhiking" capability may account for the very extensive distributions of some of the smaller species, as they could easily travel on the feet or legs of birds or bats.

== Distribution ==
The Helicarionidae are thought to be a Gondwanan family because they are restricted mainly to parts of the Southern Hemisphere and Southeast Asia, including Oceania and South Africa.

In Australia, most helicarionids are found along the eastern coast and ranges, particularly in the Border Ranges and Wet Tropics bioregions. A few species occur in South Australia, one species occurs in the high rainfall area in the south west of Western Australia and two species are found in the Kimberley region.

== Gallery ==
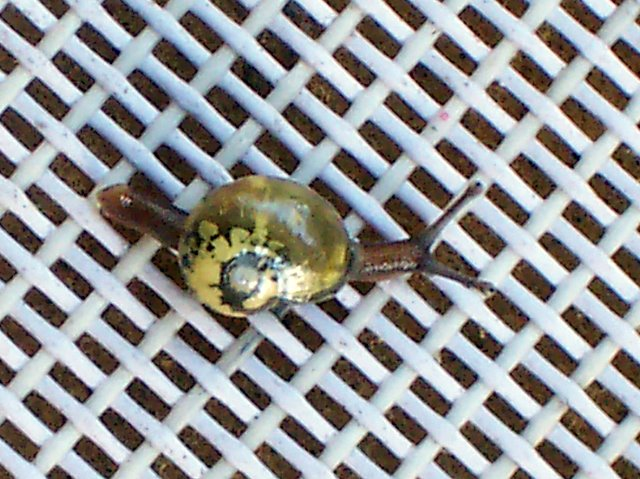
Mysticarion porrectus from the cool temperate rainforest at the Tia River, Australia

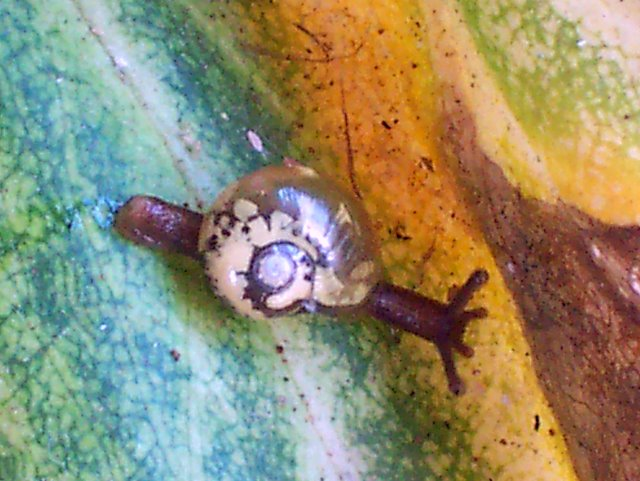
Mysticarion porrectus from the Tia River area

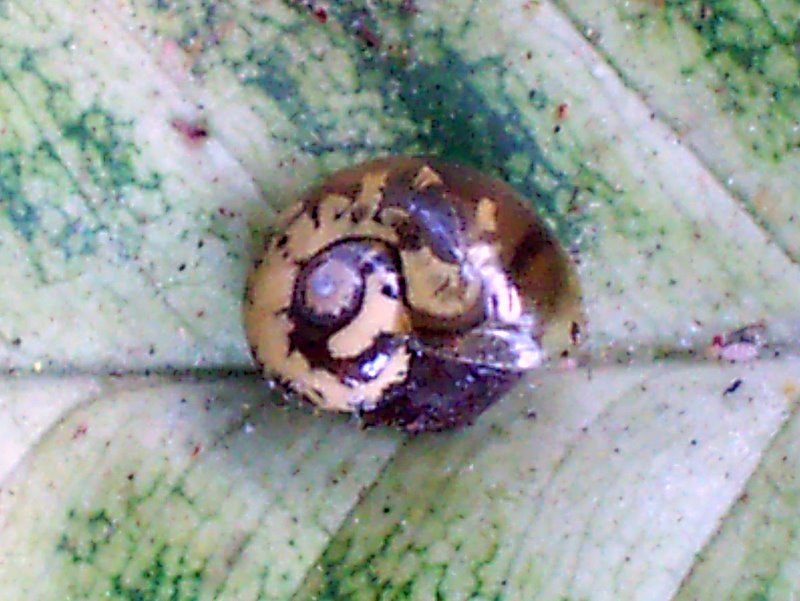
Mysticarion porrectus from the Tia River area, with the body contracted as far as it will go into the shell
