= Pachystyla waynepagei =

Conservation status
- Extinct (IUCN 2.3)

Scientific classification
- Domain: Eukaryota
- Kingdom: Animalia
- Phylum: Mollusca
- Class: Gastropoda
- Order: Stylommatophora
- Family: Helicarionidae
- Genus: Pachystyla
- Species: †P. waynepagei

Binomial name
- †Pachystyla waynepagei Griffiths, 2000

Species of gastropod

Pachystyla waynepagei was a species of small air-breathing land snail, a terrestrial pulmonate gastropod mollusk in the family Euconulidae, the hive snails. This species was native to Mauritius; it is extinct.
