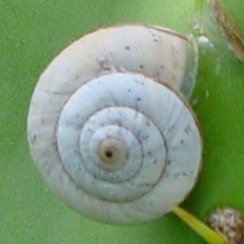

Scientific classification
- Kingdom: Animalia
- Phylum: Mollusca
- Class: Gastropoda
- Order: Stylommatophora
- Family: Helicarionidae
- Genus: Kalidos
- Species: K. mangokyanus

Binomial name
- Kalidos mangokyanus (Fischer-Piette & Salvat, 1965)

= Kalidos mangokyanus =

Species of gastropod

Kalidos mangokyanus is a species of air-breathing land snail, a terrestrial pulmonate gastropod mollusc in the family Helicarionidae.

== Distribution ==
This species occurs in Madagascar.
