= Palmgrove National Park =

National park in Queensland, Australia

- IUCN category Ia (strict nature reserve)
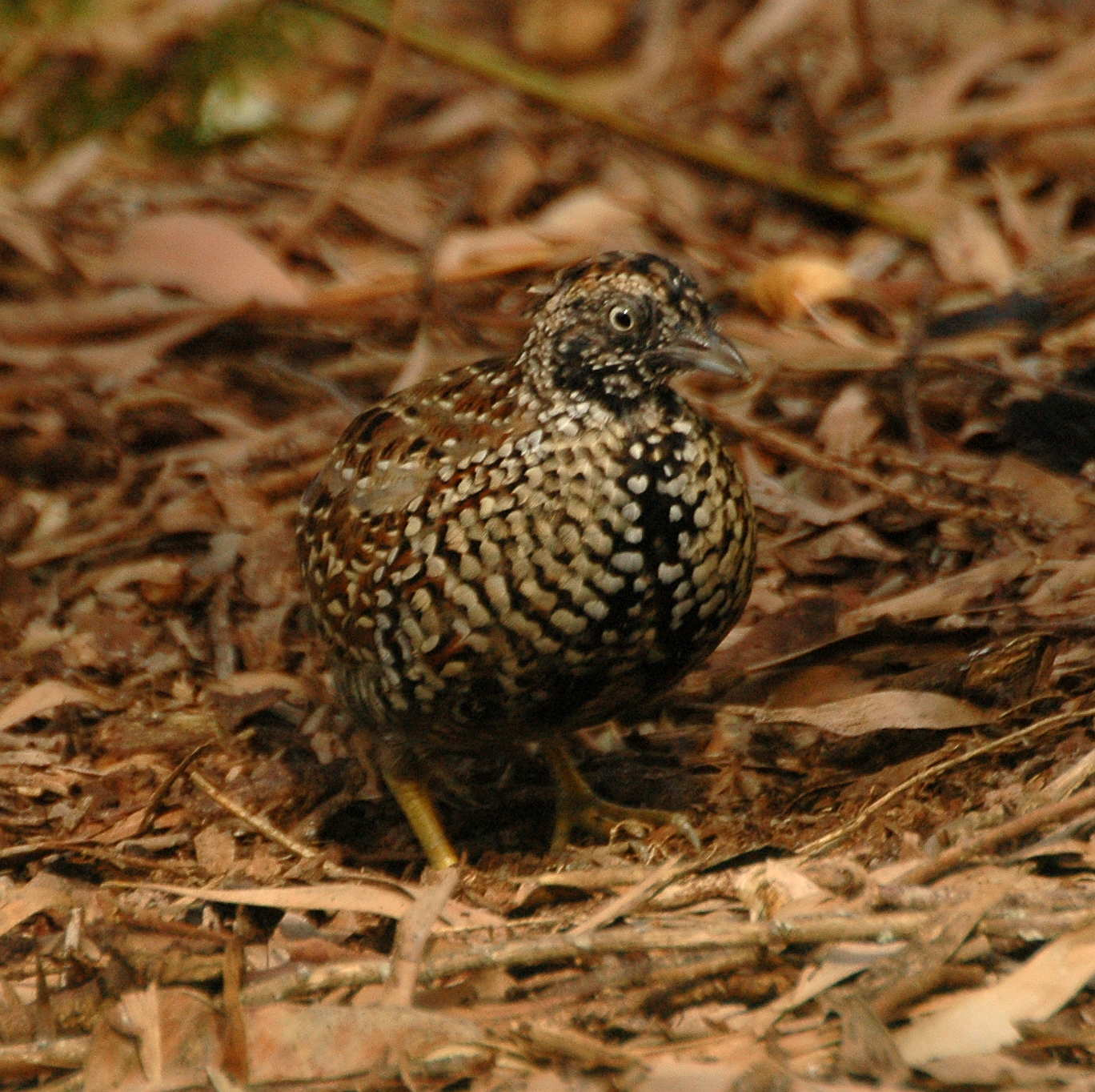
- The park is an important site for black-breasted buttonquails

- Location within Queensland
- Location: Queensland
- Nearest city: Moura
- Coordinates: 24°55′35″S 149°24′56″E
- Area: 256 km^{2} (99 sq mi)
- Established: 1991
- Governing body: Queensland Parks and Wildlife Service

Palmgrove is a national park in south-central Queensland, Australia. It lies about 185 km north-north-east of Roma and 458 km north-west of Brisbane. It is listed as a National Park (Scientific) under the Nature Conservation Act 1992, so giving it the highest level of protection possible under the Act. It was established to protect species and ecosystems of exceptional scientific value. It is located within the Dawson River catchment area.

== Description ==
Palmgrove lies in moderately dry, dissected sandstone country. The vegetation includes a variety of eucalypt woodland and forest communities as well as vine and Acacia thickets. The area is rugged and isolated; access is difficult and the park is not open to the general public.

=== Flora and fauna ===
Threatened ecosystems present in the park include:

- Acacia harpophylla - Eucalyptus cambageana open forest to woodland on fine-grained sedimentary rocks
- Semi-evergreen vine thicket on fine grained sedimentary rocks
- Acacia harpophylla and/or Casuarina cristata open forest on fine-grained sedimentary rocks
- Macropteranthes leichhardtii thicket on fine grained sedimentary rocks
- Semi-evergreen vine thicket in sheltered habitats on medium to coarse-grained sedimentary rocks

Northern quolls have been recorded in the park.

==== Important Bird Area ====
The park has been identified by BirdLife International as an Important Bird Area (IBA) because it supports an isolated, and the westernmost, population (over 10 pairs) of black-breasted buttonquails, listed as vulnerable. The rare and threatened ecosystems contained in the park are buttonquail habitat. Glossy black cockatoos, also considered to be vulnerable, are present.

== See also ==
- Protected areas of Queensland
