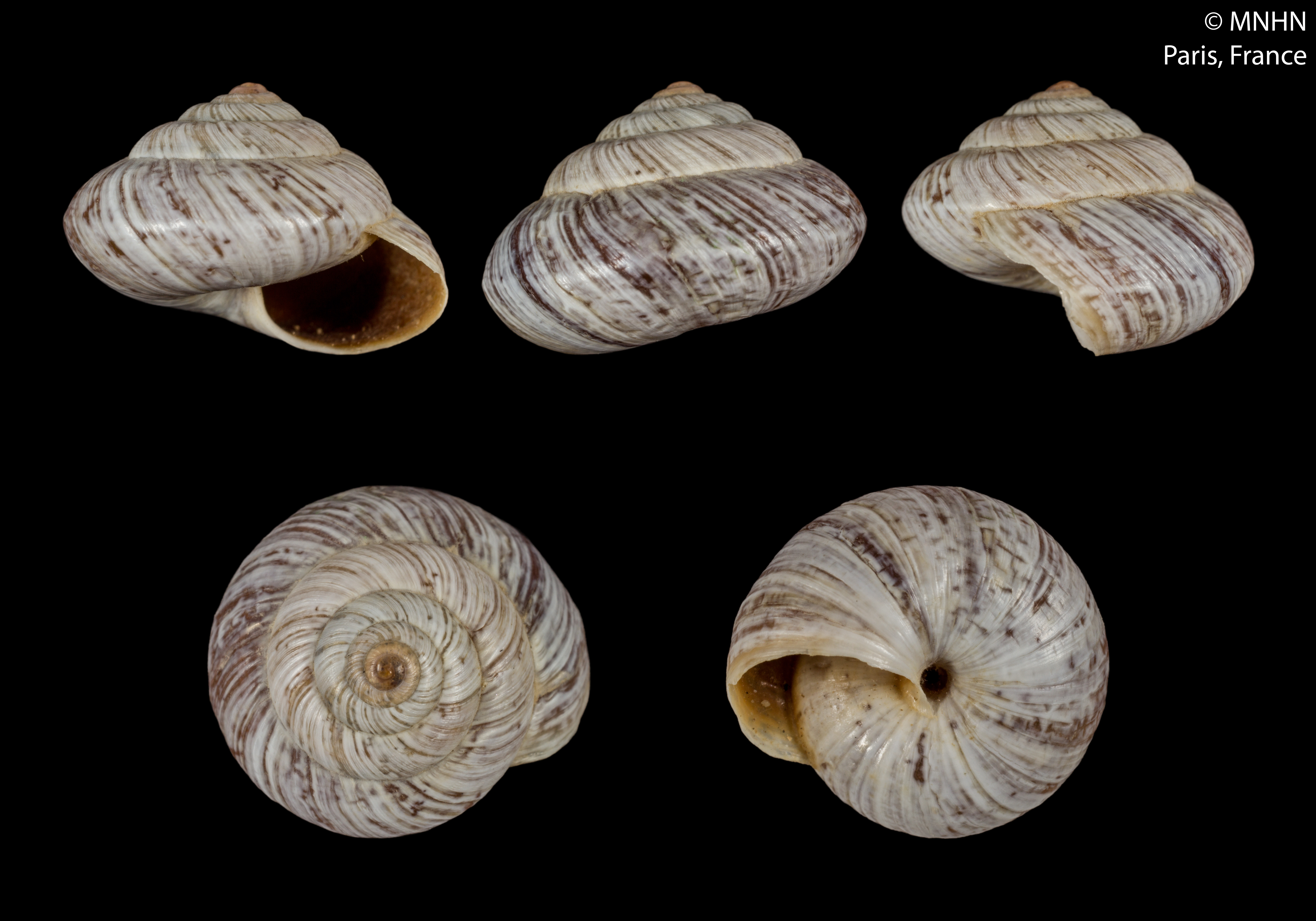
- Shell of Kalidos chastellii (holotype at MNHN, Paris)

Scientific classification
- Kingdom: Animalia
- Phylum: Mollusca
- Class: Gastropoda
- Order: Stylommatophora
- Superfamily: Helicarionoidea
- Family: Helicarionidae
- Genus: Kalidos; Gude, 1911

Type species
- Helix (Nanina) cleamesi E. A. Smith, 1882

Synonyms
- Amphiblema Gude, 1911; Methuenia (incorrect subsequent spelling); Methvenia Robson, 1914 (junior synonym); Propebloyetia Germain, 1913

= Kalidos =

Genus of gastropods

Kalidos is a genus of air-breathing land snail, a terrestrial pulmonate gastropod mollusk in the subfamily Helicarioninae of the family Helicarionidae.

== Description ==
(Original description) The depressed shell is conoid. It is finely striated, and decussated by fine or coarse spirals. The periphery is rounded or angular. The umbilicus is small.

== Distribution ==
This genus occurs in Madagascar.

== Species ==
Species within the genus Kalidos include:

- Kalidos aequivocus (Robson, 1914)
- Kalidos ambatoensis Emberton & Griffiths, 2009
- Kalidos ambilensis Fischer & Bedoucha, 1966
- Kalidos ambrae Emberton, 2007
- Kalidos amicus Fischer Blanc Salvat 1975
- Kalidos analamerae Emberton, 2007
- Kalidos anceyianus Fischer-P & Salvat, 1966
- Kalidos andapaensis Fischer Blanc Salvat, 1975
- Kalidos angulorchidus Emberton, 2007
- Kalidos anobrachis (Dohrn, 1882)
- Kalidos antsepokensis Fischer Blanc Vukad., 1974
- Kalidos avanalamerae Emberton, 2007
- Kalidos balstoni (Angas, 1877)
- Kalidos bathensis (Robson, 1914)
- Kalidos bathiei (Fischer-P & Salvat, 1965)
- Kalidos beambrae Emberton, 2007
- Kalidos benardi Fischer Blanc Salvat, 1994
- Kalidos betsaratae Emberton, 2007
- Kalidos boriambrae Emberton, 2007
- Kalidos bournei Robson, 1914
- Kalidos briandi Fischer Blanc Salvat, 1994
- Kalidos cachani Fischer Blanc Salvat, 1994
- Kalidos calculus Fischer & Bedoucha, 1966
- Kalidos capdambrae Emberton, 2007
- Kalidos capestensis Emberton & Griffiths, 2009
- Kalidos capuroni Fischer Blanc Salvat, 1975
- Kalidos chastellii (Ferussac, 1832)
- Kalidos cleamesi (Smith, 1882)
- Kalidos conorchidus Emberton, 2007
- Kalidos dautzenbergianus (Ancey, 1902)
- Kalidos decaryi Fischer Blanc Salvat, 1975
- Kalidos dupuyi Verdcourt, 2006
- Kalidos ekongensis (Angas, 1877)
- Kalidos etiambrae Emberton, 2007
- Kalidos eos (Dohrn, 1882)
- Kalidos eucharis (Deshayes, 1840)
- Kalidos fallax Fischer Blanc Salvat, 1975
- Kalidos feneriffensis (Adams & Angas, 1876)
- Kalidos fenni Emberton & Pearce, 2000
- Kalidos fisakambrae Emberton, 2007
- Kalidos fisakus Emberton, 2007
- Kalidos foitra Emberton, 2007
- Kalidos fuscoluteus (Grateloup, 1840)
- Kalidos gallorum Emberton, 2007
- Kalidos galokoae Emberton, 2007
- Kalidos germodi Fischer Blanc Salvat, 1994
- Kalidos gervaisi Fischer Blanc Salvat, 1994
- Kalidos ginoi (Falconieri, 1995)
- Kalidos glessi Fischer Blanc Salvat, 1975
- Kalidos globosus Emberton, 2007
- Kalidos gora Emberton et al., 2010
- Kalidos granosculptus (Ancey, 1902)
- Kalidos griffithshauchleri Emberton, 2002
- Kalidos guernesti Fischer Blanc Salvat, 1994
- Kalidos helleri Fischer Blanc Salvat, 1994
- Kalidos hildebrandti (Dohrn, 1882)
- Kalidos hova (Odhner, 1919)
- Kalidos humbloti (Ancey, 1902)
- Kalidos josephinae Emberton & Griffiths, 2009
- Kalidos ketronambrae Emberton, 2007
- Kalidos kosugei Falconieri, 1995
- Kalidos lamenni Fischer Blanc Salvat, 1994
- Kalidos lamyi Fischer & Bedoucha, 1966
- Kalidos lapillus Fischer & Bedoucha, 1966
- Kalidos liardi Fischer Blanc Salvat, 1994
- Kalidos loucoubeensis Fischer Blanc Salvat, 1994
- Kalidos luroni Fischer Blanc Salvat, 1994
- Kalidos mandamus Emberton, 2007
- Kalidos mangokyanus (Fischer-P & Salvat, 1965)
- Kalidos manotrika Emberton et al., 2010
- Kalidos manta Emberton et al., 2010
- Kalidos manumboensis Emberton, 1994
- Kalidos marojezianus Fischer Blanc Salvat, 1994
- Kalidos maryannae Griffiths & Herbert, 2013
- Kalidos matoatoa Emberton, 2007
- Kalidos menani Fischer Blanc Salvat, 1993
- Kalidos merschardti Fischer Blanc Salvat, 1975
- Kalidos microlamyi Fischer Blanc Vukad., 1974
- Kalidos milloti Fischer Blanc Salvat, 1966
- Kalidos minangulorchidus Emberton, 2007
- Kalidos minorchidus Emberton, 2007
- Kalidos montis Fischer & Bedoucha, 1966
- Kalidos nelamni Fischer Blanc Salvat, 1994
- Kalidos oleatus (Ancey, 1902)
- Kalidos orchidus Emberton, 2007
- Kalidos oxyacme (Ancey, 1902)
- Kalidos pendutsaratae Emberton, 2007
- Kalidos piperatus (Fulton, 1901)
- Kalidos platorchidus Emberton, 2007
- Kalidos prenanti Fischer Blanc Salvat, 1994
- Kalidos profugus (Ancey, 1902)
- Kalidos prominens Fischer-P & Salvat, 1966
- Kalidos propeanobrachis Fischer & Bedoucha, 1966
- Kalidos prunelli Fischer Blanc Salvat, 1994
- Kalidos ramesi Fischer Blanc Salvat, 1994
- Kalidos richardi Emberton & Pearce, 2000
- Kalidos rioui Fischer Blanc Salvat, 1994
- Kalidos rudolfi Fischer Blanc Salvat, 1994
- Kalidos rufescens (Grateloup, 1840)
- Kalidos secans Fischer Blanc Salvat, 1975
- Kalidos severini Fischer Blanc Salvat, 1994
- Kalidos striaspiralis Emberton & Pearce, 2000
- Kalidos suarezensis (Dautzenberg, 1894)
- Kalidos ternieri Fischer Blanc Salvat, 1994
- Kalidos thalia (Dohrn, 1882)
- Kalidos toisuarezensis Emberton, 2007
- Kalidos torfani Fischer Blanc Salvat, 1994
- Kalidos tranomarensis Fischer Blanc Vukad., 1974
- Kalidos tsarabe Emberton & Griffiths, 2009
- Kalidos tsaratananensis Fischer-P & Salvat, 1966
- Kalidos tsialangiensis Fischer Blanc Vukad., 1974
- Kalidos vasihae Emberton & Pearce, 2000
- Kalidos vavaboriborius Emberton, 2007
- Kalidos zahamenensis Fischer Blanc Salvat, 1994

Species brought into synonymy

- Kalidos acutus Fischer-Piette & Salvat, 1966: synonym of Sitala acuta (Fischer-Piette & Salvat, 1966) (original combination)
- Kalidos culminis Fischer-Piette & Salvat, 1966: synonym of Sitala culminis (Fischer-Piette & Salvat, 1966) (original combination)
- Kalidos delphini Fischer-Piette, Blanc, F. & Vukadinovic, 1974: synonym of Sitala delphini (Fischer-Piette, Blanc, F. & Vukadinovic, 1974) (original combination)
- Kalidos elevatus Fischer-Piette & Salvat, 1966: synonym of Sitala elevata (Fischer-Piette & Salvat, 1966) (original combination)
- Kalidos huberi Thach, 2018: synonym of Kalidos chastellii (Deshayes in Férussac, 1832) (junior synonym)
- Kalidos tenebricus Fischer-Piette, Blanc, F. & Salvat, 1975: synonym of Kalidos anceyianus Fischer-Piette & Salvat, 1966 (junior synonym)
- Kalidos tulearensis Fischer-Piette & Salvat, 1966: synonym of Trochonanina tulearensis (Fischer-Piette & Salvat, 1966) (original combination)
