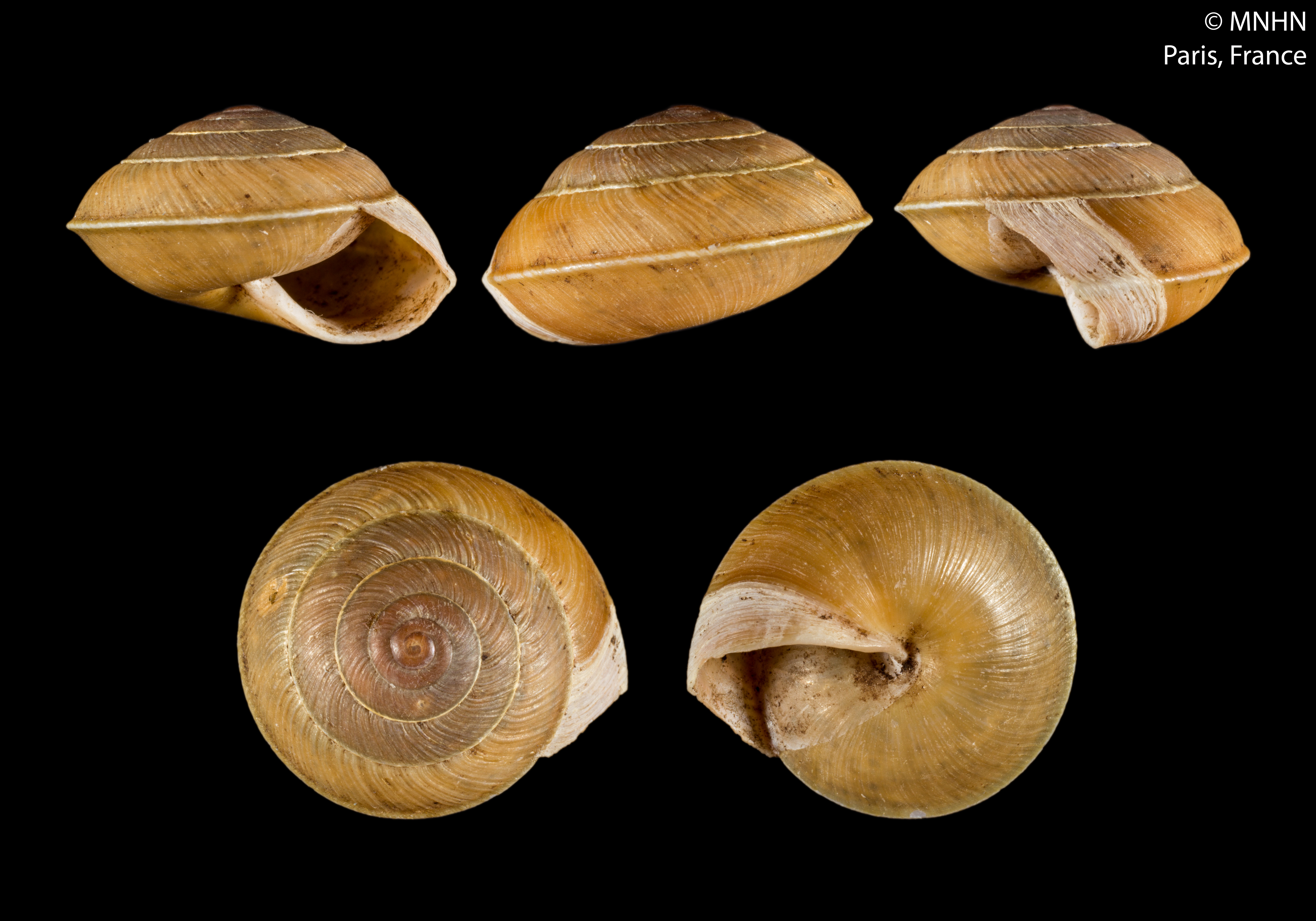
- Shell of Pachystyla bicolor (syntype at MNHN, Paris)

Scientific classification
- Kingdom: Animalia
- Phylum: Mollusca
- Class: Gastropoda
- Order: Stylommatophora
- Infraorder: Limacoidei
- Superfamily: Helicarionoidea
- Family: Helicarionidae
- Genus: Pachystyla; Moerch, 1852

Synonyms
- Pachystyla (Caelatura)· accepted, alternate representation

= Pachystyla =

Genus of gastropods

Pachystyla is a genus of small air-breathing land snails, terrestrial pulmonate gastropod mollusks in the family Helicarionidae.

== Distribution ==
These terrestrial species occur in Mauritius.

== Species ==
Species within the genus Pachystyla include:

- Pachystyla bicolor (Lamarck, 1822)
- Pachystyla rufozonata (H. Adams, 1869)
- Pachystyla waynepagei Griffiths, 2000

Species brought into synonymy

- Pachystyla inversicolor (Férussac, 1822): synonym of Pachystyla bicolor (Lamarck, 1822)
- Pachystyla leucostyla (L. Pfeiffer, 1855): synonym of Pachystyla bicolor (Lamarck, 1822)
- Pachystyla scalpta E. von Martens, 1878: synonym of Dancea semifusca (Deshayes, 1832) (junior synonym)
