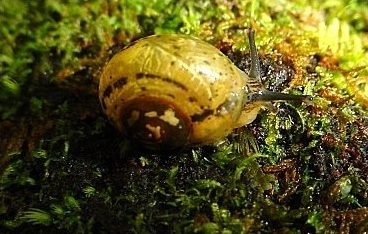
- A live juvenile of Plegma caelatura

Scientific classification
- Kingdom: Animalia
- Phylum: Mollusca
- Class: Gastropoda
- Order: Stylommatophora
- Family: Helicarionidae
- Genus: Plegma; Gude, 1911

Synonyms
- Ariocaelatura Germain, 1921 Coelatura L. Pfeiffer, 1877

= Plegma =

Genus of gastropods

Plegma is a genus of minute, air-breathing land snails, terrestrial pulmonate gastropod mollusks in the family Helicarionidae.

== Species ==
Species within the genus Plegma include:

- Plegma caelatura (Férussac, 1821)
- Plegma duponti (Morelet, 1866)
