= Dancea rodriguezensis =

Conservation status
- Endangered (IUCN 2.3)

Scientific classification
- Kingdom: Animalia
- Phylum: Mollusca
- Class: Gastropoda
- Order: Stylommatophora
- Family: Euconulidae
- Genus: Dancea
- Species: D. rodriguezensis

Binomial name
- Dancea rodriguezensis (Crosse, 1873)

Species of gastropod

Dancea rodriguezensis is a species of air-breathing land snail, a terrestrial pulmonate gastropod mollusk in the family Euconulidae, the hive snails. This species is endemic to Mauritius.
