= Eurychlamys =

Scientific classification
- Kingdom: Animalia
- Phylum: Mollusca
- Class: Gastropoda
- Order: Stylommatophora
- Family: Helicarionidae
- Genus: Eurychlamys; Godwin-Austen, 1899

Synonyms
- Nanina (Thysanota) Albers, 1860; Queridomus Iredale, 1937

Genus of land snails

Eurychlamys is a genus of air-breathing land snails, terrestrial pulmonate gastropod mollusks in the family Helicarionidae. These snails are restricted to Western Ghats of India and Sri Lanka.

Three species are recognized.

== Species ==
- Eurychlamys platychlamys (Blanford, 1881)
- Eurychlamys todarum (W. T. Blanford & H. F. Blanford, 1861)
- Eurychlamys vilipensa (Benson, 1853)
