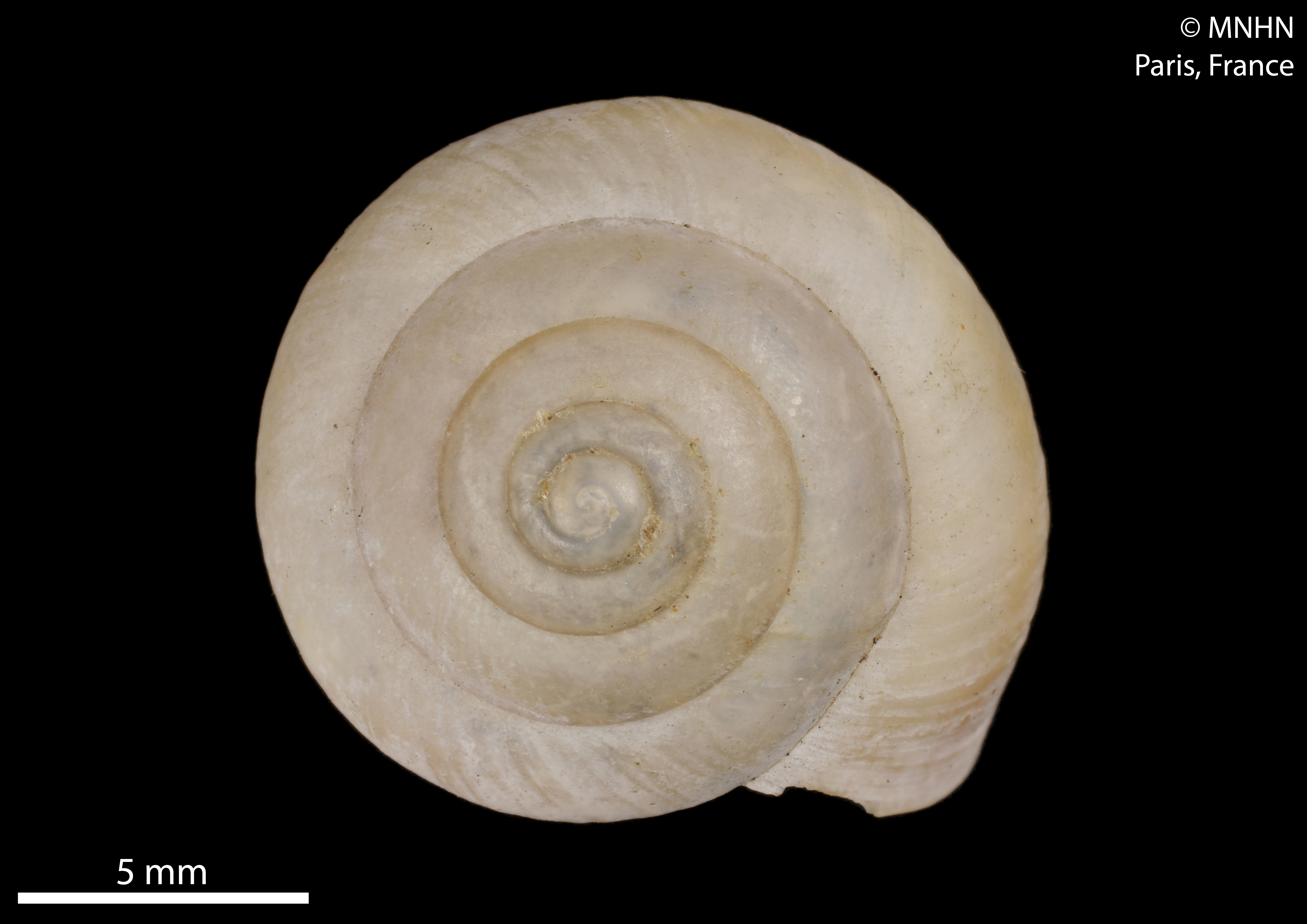
- Shell of Quirosella coultasi (specimen at MNHN, Paris)

Scientific classification
- Kingdom: Animalia
- Phylum: Mollusca
- Class: Gastropoda
- Order: Stylommatophora
- Infraorder: Limacoidei
- Superfamily: Helicarionoidea
- Family: Helicarionidae
- Genus: Quirosella; Clench, 1958

Type species
- Quirosella coultasi Clench, 1958

= Quirosella =

Genus of land snails

Quirosella is a genus of glass snails that is endemic to Rennell Island, Solomon Islands.

== Species ==
- Quirosella coultasi Clench, 1958
- Quirosella knudseni Clench, 1958
- Quirosella wolffi Clench, 1958
