= Browns Field (New South Wales) =

- other
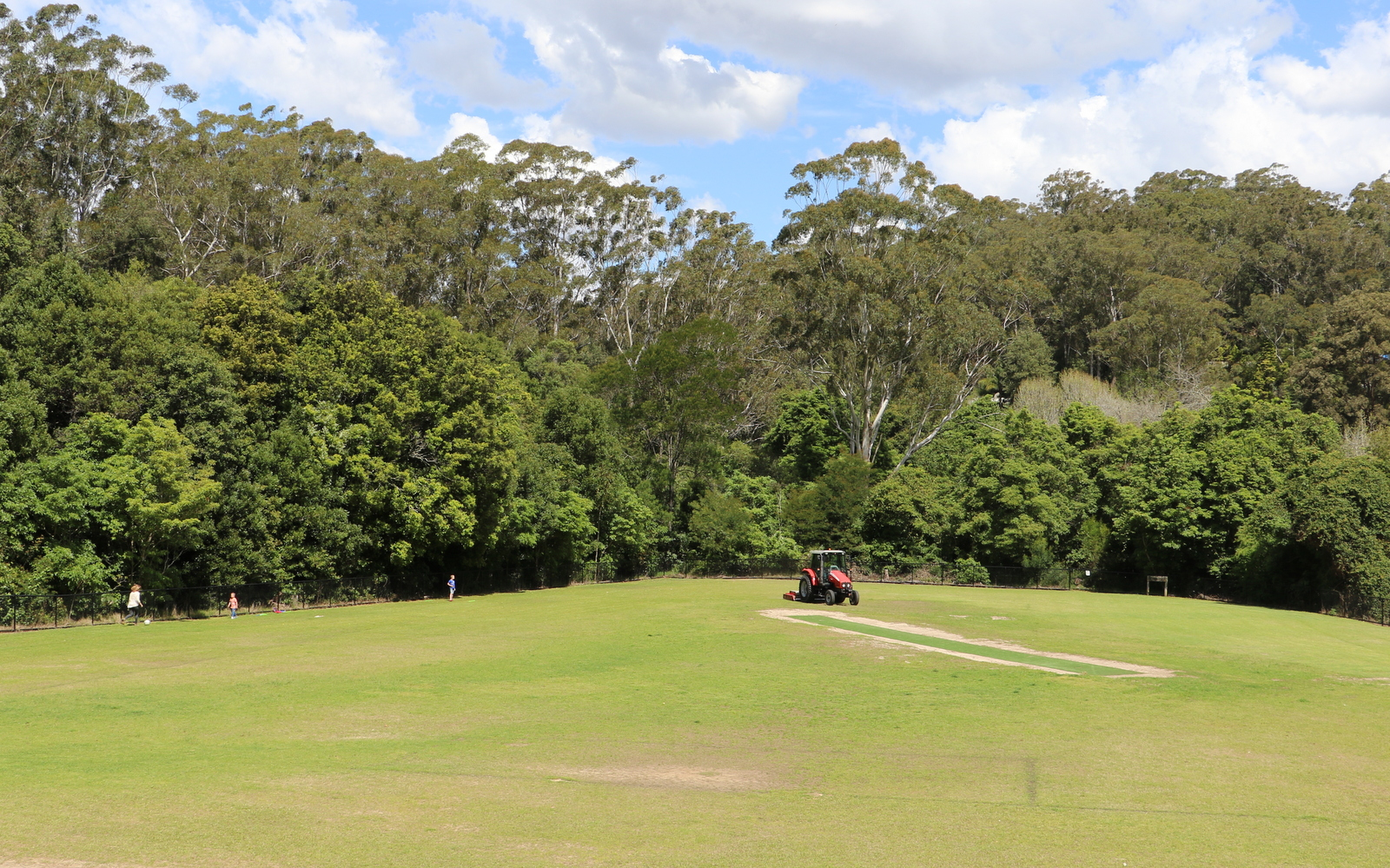
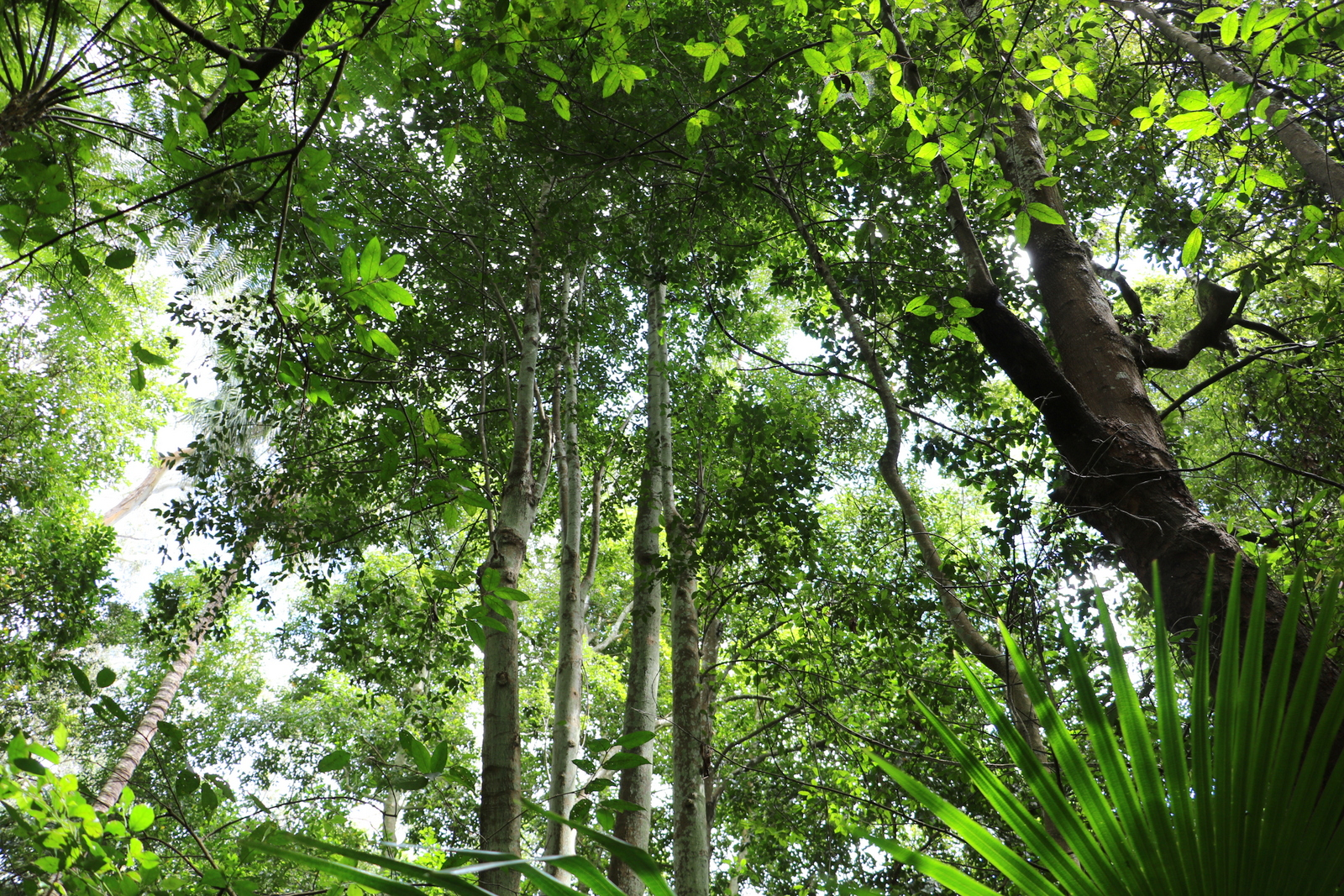
- Rainforest at Browns Field

- Coordinates: 33°44′2.8″S 151°06′30.45″E
- Country: Australia
- State: New South Wales
- Website: Browns Field (New South Wales)

Browns Field is located in Fox Valley Wahroonga, 17 km (11 mi) north-west from Sydney, in the state of New South Wales, Australia. It contains a small sporting ground and a bushland reserve. A unique rainforest grows nearby, due to enriched soils from ancient volcanic activity.

== Geology ==
Browns Field is situated on a maar-diatreme. It was around 200 metres in diameter. The mafic soils are a typical dark colour. The diatreme occurred in the early Jurassic, around 200 million years ago. The volcanic explosion erupted through the local Hawkesbury sandstone. Much of the rock formed by the diatreme is buried under soil cover, as well as landfill that helped create the sports oval at Browns Field. The soil is a mixture of organic material, and a soil horizon made up of weathered regolith particles. Rocky evidence of the diatreme is not obviously seen.

== History ==
The local indigenous Australian people, the Kuringgai occupied this area for thousands of years. The emancipated convict Thomas Hyndes settled the nearby area in 1822. In 1838, Governor Darling made a 259 hectare land grant to Hyndes. He worked the land with convict labour supplying timber to the colony of New South Wales. In 1854 the area was sold to John Brown, a merchant and timber getter. He also planted orchards nearby. Locally known as 'Squire Brown', he owned of a square mile of land. At his peak, he employed one hundred pairs of pit-sawyers. These were used for various projects, including the supply of timber for the Pyrmont and Glebe Island Bridges. The area currently used as a sporting field was once indigenous forest, and later, a rubbish tip.

== Recreation ==
The oval is used for various activities such as football and cricket. A bushwalking track starts near the field.

== Flora ==
Many rainforest plants unusual to the Sydney area are present. Such as golden sassafras, jackwood, wild quince, giant maidenhair, fishbone water fern, strap water fern, and the sub tropical rainforest tree, the koda. A population of the critically endangered scrub turpentine persists at Browns Field. The paucity of fire, dark volcanic soils and high rainfall, contribute to rainforest vegetation. The average annual rainfall is 1,400 mm (55 in) at the nearby Kissing Point Road weather station.

== Fauna ==
Ring-tail possums, brushtail possums and grey-headed flying foxes are common. Many bird species live nearby, such as rainbow lorikeets, Australian king parrots, crimson rosellas, currawongs, koel and the tawny frogmouth. The powerful owl is known to nest in the reserve. A population of the iridescent semi-slug occurs in the rainforest.

== Bush regeneration ==
Forest conservation work is in progress. The weeds trad and privet being particularly troublesome.
