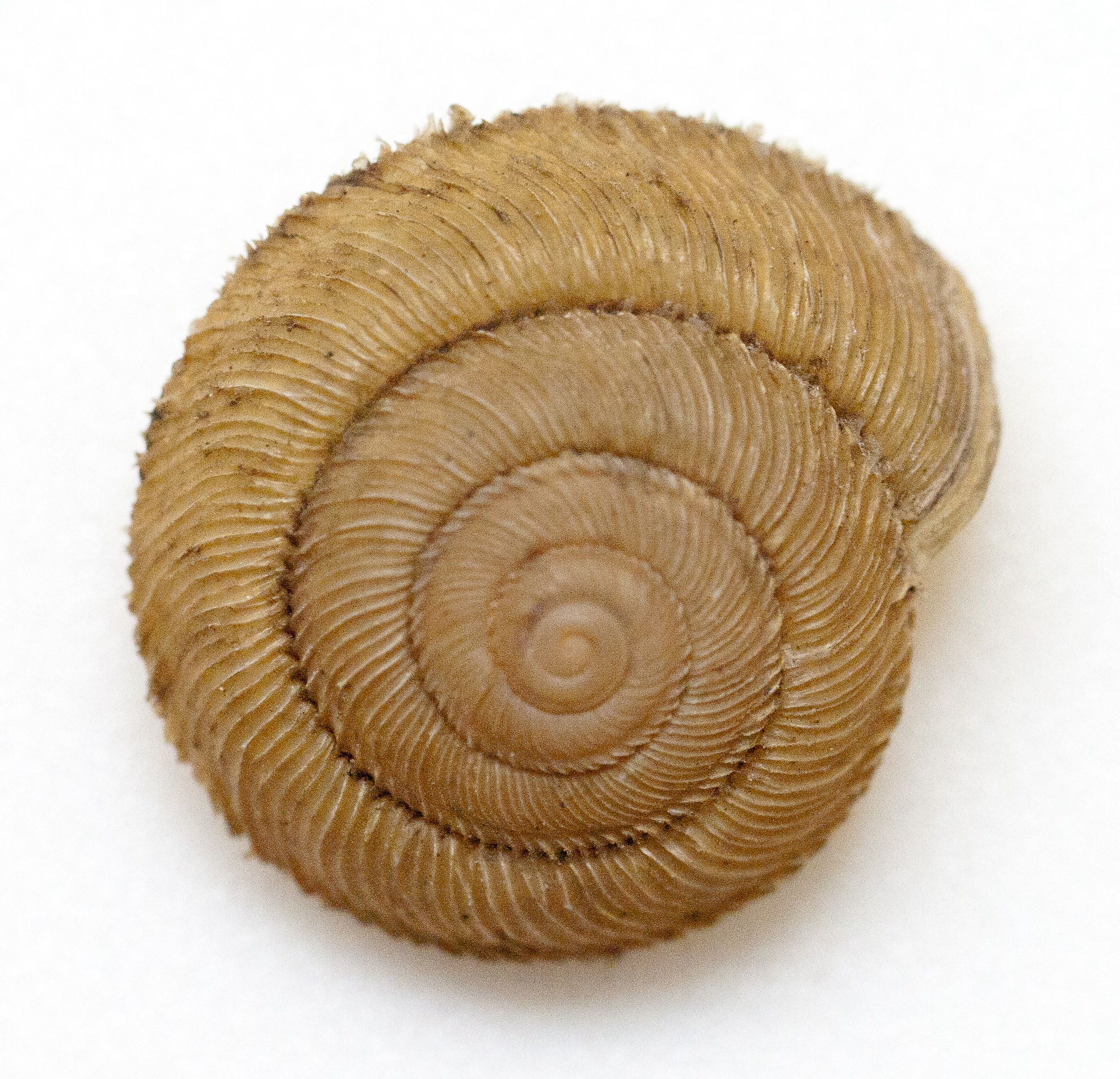

Scientific classification
- Domain: Eukaryota
- Kingdom: Animalia
- Phylum: Mollusca
- Class: Gastropoda
- Order: Stylommatophora
- Family: Helicarionidae
- Subfamily: Helicarioninae
- Genus: Epiglypta; Pilsbry, 1893
- Species: E. howeinsulae

Binomial name
- Epiglypta howeinsulae (Cox, 1873)

Synonyms
- Genus synonymy: Nanina (Epiglypta) Pilsbry, 1893; Species synonymy: Helix howeinsulae Cox, 1873

= Epiglypta =

Genus of land snails

Epiglypta is a monotypic genus of glass snails that is endemic to Australia’s Lord Howe Island in the Tasman Sea. The species is Epiglypta howeinsulae, also known as the ribbed glass snail; it has not been collected since 1920 and may be extinct due to rat predation.

== Description ==
The shell of adult snails is 17–21 mm in height, with a diameter of 31.9–34.8 mm, subglobose with a moderately raised spire, with rounded whorls, impressed sutures and closely spaced radial ribs. It is yellowish-brown in colouration. The umbilicus is narrowly open in juveniles, closed by reflection in adults. The aperture is ovately lunate. It is identifiable by its large and distinctly ribbed shell.

== Distribution and habitat ==
The snail's distribution was limited to the vicinity of the summits of the southern mountains of the island, where it was found beneath stones and on wet rock faces.
