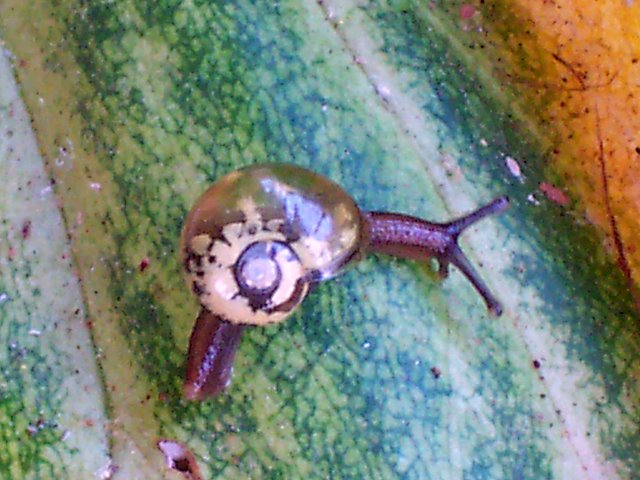
- Mysticarion porrectus from the Tia River, Great Dividing Range, Australia

Scientific classification
- Kingdom: Animalia
- Phylum: Mollusca
- Class: Gastropoda
- Order: Stylommatophora
- Infraorder: Limacoidei
- Superfamily: Helicarionoidea
- Family: Helicarionidae
- Genus: Mysticarion; Iredale, 1941

Type species
- Mysticarion leucospira insuetus Iredale, 1941

= Mysticarion =

Genus of gastropods

Mysticarion is a genus of air-breathing, tree-dwelling land snails, terrestrial arboreal pulmonate gastropod molluscs in the subfamily Helicarioninae of the family Helicarionidae.

== Species ==
Species within the genus Mysticarion include:

- Mysticarion hyalinus (L. Pfeiffer, 1855)
- Mysticarion insuetus - the type subspecies
- Mysticarion leucospira (Pfeiffer, 1857) - type species
- Mysticarion obscurior Hyman, Lamborena & Köhler, 2017
- Mysticarion porrectus (Iredale, 1941)

Species brought into synonymy

- Mysticarion huberi Thach, 2016: synonym of Megaustenia huberi (Thach, 2016) (original combination)
- Mysticarion leucospira (L. Pfeiffer, 1857) : synonym of Microkerkus leucospira (L. Pfeiffer, 1857) (superseded combination)
