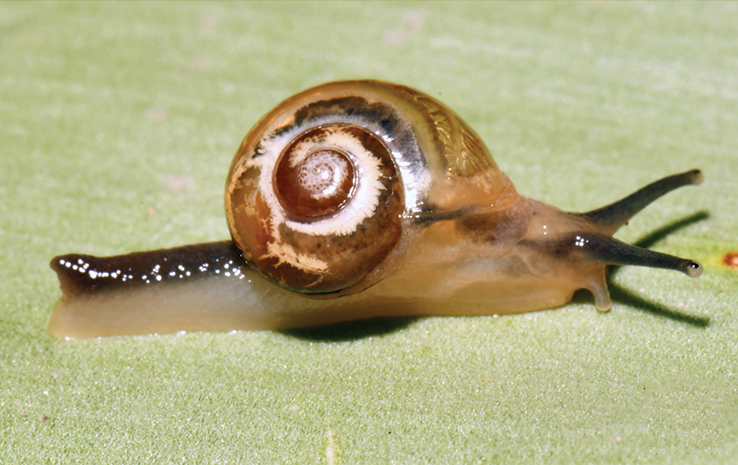
- A snail of Durgella russeola

Scientific classification
- Kingdom: Animalia
- Phylum: Mollusca
- Class: Gastropoda
- Order: Stylommatophora
- Family: Helicarionidae
- Subfamily: Durgellinae
- Tribe: Durgellini
- Genus: Durgella; W. T. Blanford, 1863

Type species
- Helix levicula W. H. Benson, 1859

Species
- See text

Synonyms
- Macrochlamys (Durgella) W. T. Blanford, 1863; Nanina (Durgella) W. T. Blanford, 1863

= Durgella =

Genus of land snails

Durgella is a genus of glass snails in the subfamily Durgellinae of the family Helicarionidae.

== Description ==
The Additional and Principal Characters of the Genus Durgella (description by H.H. Godwin-Austen)

1. The right and left mantle-lobes moderate, the shell-lobes very ample; the right shell-lobe extends from the anal aperture (close to the upper angle of the shell-aperture) to the columellar margin, and spreads away over the shell in a broad triangular tongue; the left shell-lobe is reflected slightly over the edge of the shell in front, from near the respiratory orifice, and becomes wider on the lower margin as it approaches the umbilicus, and is also of triangular shape when extended. A large portion of the shell is always exposed.

2. The mucous pore is well developed, with a large overhanging lobe.

3. The jaw is very thin, membranaceous, almost straight on the margin, with a very slight central projection.

4, The odontophore is broader than long, with a central minute, tricuspid tooth; the lateral teeth all similar, minutely 6-cuspid or pectiniform, on a curved edge, very closely set together and exceedingly numerous. 170—1—170+.

5. In generative organs, an amatorial organ present in the Burmese form is absent in the Indian.

6. Shell thin or membranaceous, globose or depressedly conoid; polished, very closely perforate, the columellar margin having no solidity.

== Distribution ==
Species of this genus have been found in Southeast Asia.

== Species ==
- Durgella aborense Godwin-Austen, 1916
- Durgella assamica Gondwin-Austen, 1881
- Durgella christianae (Theobald, 1864)
- Durgella densestriata Vermeulen, T.-S. Liew & Schilthuizen, 2015
- Durgella dwipana (Gude, 1903)
- Durgella edeana Godwin-Austen, 1910
- Durgella erratica (Godwin-Austen, 1888)
- Durgella hosei Godwin-Austen, 1891
- Durgella khasiaca Godwin-Austen, 1883
- Durgella kumahensis (Theobald & Stoliczka, 1872)
- Durgella levicula (W. H. Benson, 1859)
- Durgella libas Solem, 1966
- Durgella mairangensis Godwin-Austen, 1898
- Durgella naharaniensis Godwin-Austen, 1914
- Durgella nulla Pholyotha & Panha, 2024
- Durgella pentata Pholyotha & Panha, 2024
- Durgella rhaphiellus (E. von Martens, 1867)
- Durgella rogersi Godwin-Austen, 1907
- Durgella russeola (Morelet, 1865)
- Durgella salius (W. H. Benson, 1859)
- Durgella seposita (W. H. Benson, 1859)
- Durgella siamensis Möllendorff, 1902
- Durgella sundana B. Rensch, 1930

Synonyms

- Durgella dekhanensis Godwin-Austen, 1898: synonym of Satiella dekhanensis (Godwin-Austen, 1898) (original combination)
- Durgella levidensis Godwin-Austen, 1898: synonym of Satiella levidensis (Godwin-Austen, 1898) (original combination)
- Durgella pusilla (E. von Martens, 1867): synonym of Durgella dwipana (Gude, 1903) (invalid; based on preoccupied original name)
- Durgella sumbaensis Godwin-Austen, 1898: synonym of Helicarion sumbaensis (Godwin-Austen, 1898) (original combination)
