= Ibycus (gastropod) =

Scientific classification
- Domain: Eukaryota
- Kingdom: Animalia
- Phylum: Mollusca
- Class: Gastropoda
- Order: Stylommatophora
- Family: Helicarionidae
- Subfamily: Durgellinae
- Tribe: Durgellini
- Genus: Ibycus; Heynemann, 1863

Synonyms
- Girasia (Ibycus) Heynemann, 1863; Helicarion (Leptodontarion) P. Sarasin & F. Sarasin, 1899 (junior synonym); Leptodontarion P.Sarasin & F.Sarasin, 1899

Genus of molluscs

Ibycus is a genus of air-breathing semi-slugs, in the family Helicarionidae.

== Species ==
- Ibycus albacuminatus (P. Sarasin & F. Sarasin, 1899)
- Ibycus cingulatus (B.Rensch, 1930)
- Ibycus coriaceus (P. Sarasin & F. Sarasin, 1899)
- Ibycus fissidens Heynemann, 1863
- Ibycus hiraseanus (Pilsbry, 1906)
- Ibycus minutus (Godwin-Austen, 1876)
- Ibycus papuanus I. Rensch, 1932
- Ibycus perakensis (Godwin-Austen, 1909)
- Ibycus rachelae Schilthuizen & Liew, 2008
- Ibycus siamensis Cockerell, 1891
