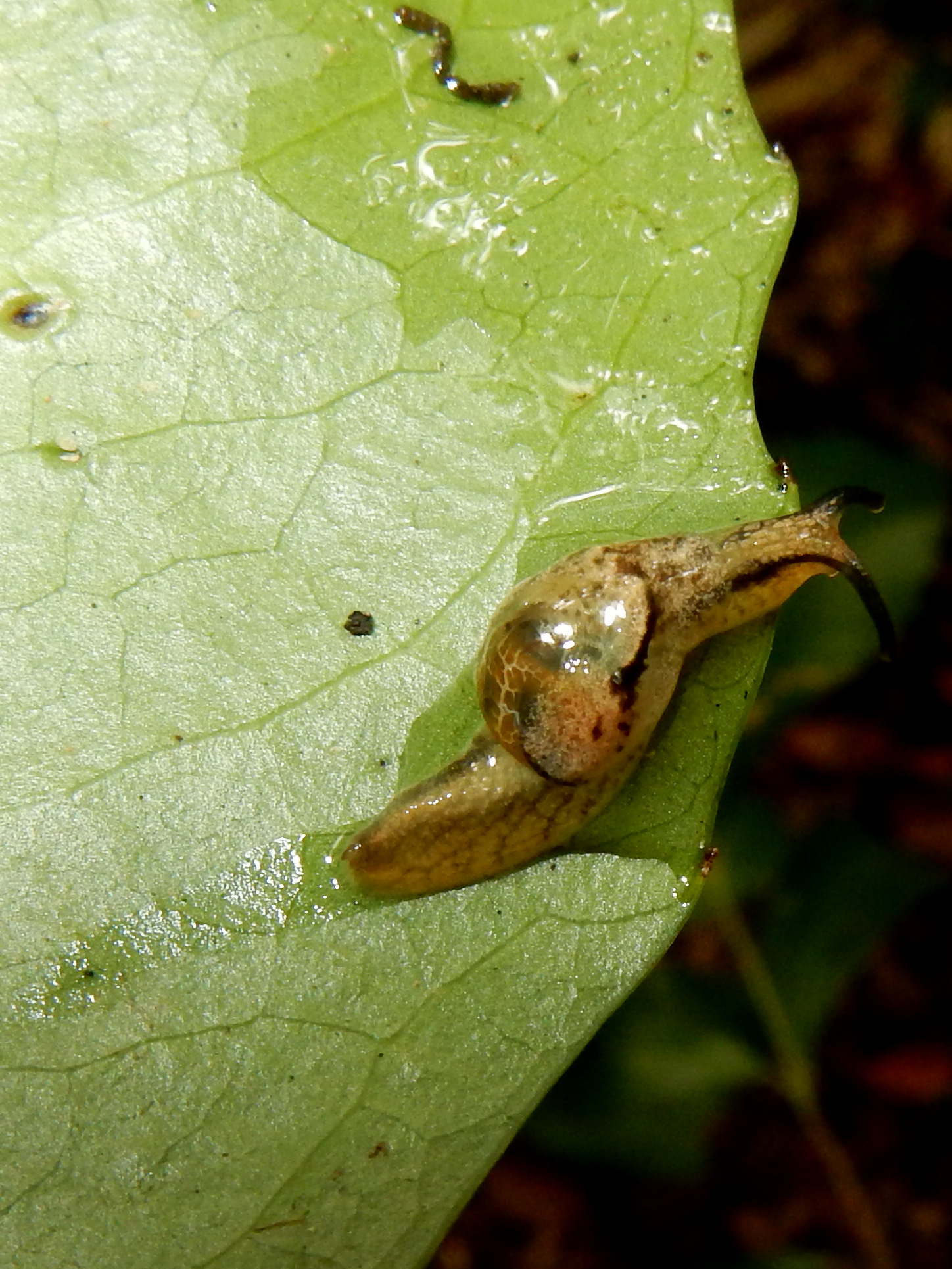
- Ubiquitarion iridis at Browns Field

Scientific classification
- Kingdom: Animalia
- Phylum: Mollusca
- Class: Gastropoda
- Order: Stylommatophora
- Family: Helicarionidae
- Genus: Ubiquitarion; Hyman, Lamborena & Köhler, 2017
- Species: U. iridis

Binomial name
- Ubiquitarion iridis (Hyman, 2007)

Synonyms
- Peloparion iridis Hyman, 2007

= Ubiquitarion =

Species of mollusc

Ubiquitarion iridis, the iridescent semi-slug, is a tree-dwelling snail in the family Helicarionidae. It is the only species in the genus Ubiquitarion.

It is endemic to Australia. This species occurs in and near rainforests in north eastern New South Wales and south eastern Queensland. Accidentally introduced to Sydney and the Central Coast of New South Wales.
