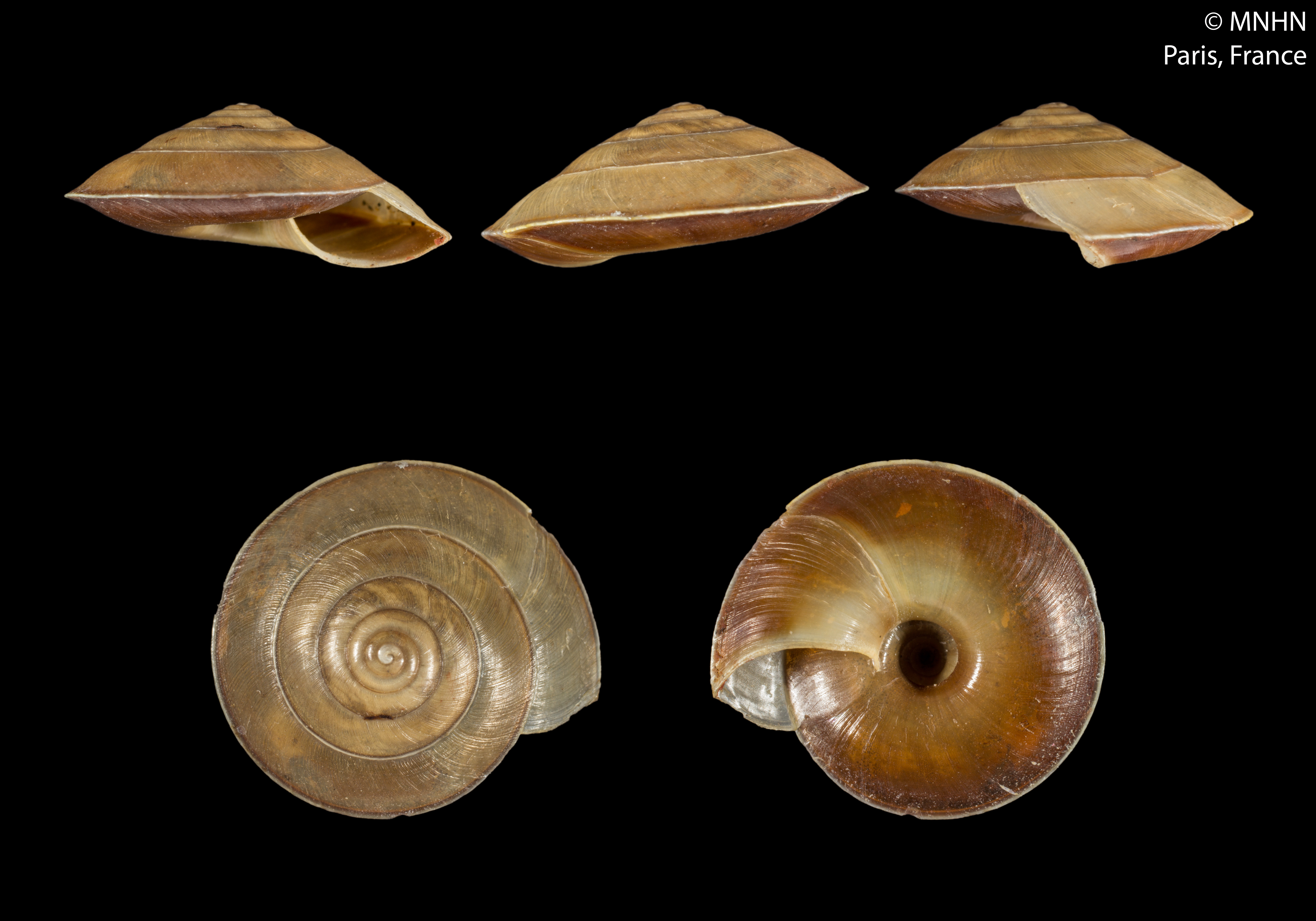
- Shell of Sivella albofilosa (syntype at MNHN, Paris)

Scientific classification
- Kingdom: Animalia
- Phylum: Mollusca
- Class: Gastropoda
- Order: Stylommatophora
- Infraorder: Limacoidei
- Superfamily: Helicarionoidea
- Family: Helicarionidae
- Genus: Sivella; W. T. Blanford, 1863

Type species
- Helix castra Benson, 1852

Synonyms
- Helix (Sivella) W. T. Blanford, 1863 (original rank); Trochomorpha (Sivella) W. T. Blanford, 1863 (superseded combination)

= Sivella =

Genus of gastropods

Sivella is a genus of air-breathing land snails, terrestrial pulmonate gastropod mollusks in the subfamily Durgellinae of the family Helicarionidae.

== Species ==
- Sivella albofilosa (Bavay & Dautzenberg, 1909)
- Sivella bagoensis (Hidalgo, 1890)
- Sivella billeana (Mörch, 1872)
- Sivella bintuanensis (Hidalgo, 1890)
- Sivella castra (Benson, 1852)
- Sivella cerea (Möllendorff, 1898)
- Sivella costellifera (Möllendorff, 1890)
- Sivella crossei (Hidalgo, 1890)
- Sivella decipiens (Quadras & Möllendorff, 1898)
- Sivella galerus (Benson, 1856)
- Sivella granulosa (Möllendorff, 1888)
- Sivella heptogyra (Quadras & Möllendorff, 1894)
- Sivella hyptiocyclos (Benson, 1863)
- Sivella latior (Bavay & Dautzenberg, 1909)
- Sivella loocensis (Hidalgo, 1887)
- Sivella luteobrunnea (Möllendorff, 1890)
- Sivella mindoroana (Quadras & Möllendorff, 1895)
- Sivella montana (Möllendorff, 1901)
- Sivella platysma (Quadras & Möllendorff, 1896)
- Sivella pseudosericina (Möllendorff, 1898)
- Sivella rufa (Möllendorff, 1888)
- Sivella sericata (Möllendorff, 1898)
- Sivella sericina (Möllendorff, 1893)
- Sivella splendens (C. Semper, 1873)
- Sivella splendidula (Möllendorff, 1890)
- Sivella subtaeniata (Quadras & Möllendorff, 1896)
- Sivella suturalis (Quadras & Möllendorff, 1894)

Synonym

- Sivella paviei (Morlet, 1885): synonuym of Trochomorpha paviei (Morlet, 1885)
