= Nitor pudibunda =

Scientific classification
- Kingdom: Animalia
- Phylum: Mollusca
- Class: Gastropoda
- Order: Stylommatophora
- Family: Helicarionidae
- Genus: Nitor
- Species: N. pudibunda

Binomial name
- Nitor pudibunda Cox, 1868

Synonyms
- Helix pudibunda

Species of gastropod

Nitor pudibunda is a species of air-breathing land snail, a terrestrial pulmonate gastropod mollusk in the family Helicarionidae. This species is endemic to Australia.

== Description ==
Cox's description of the shell of a specimen of N. pudibunda, published in A Monograph of Australian Land Shells, 1868.^{α}

Shell perforated, depressly-turbinate, thin and transparent, very smooth, showing under the lens very faint curved lines, and traces of still fainter spiral lines, shining, pinkish or flesh coloured; spire broadly conical, rather acute; 6 whorls, flatly convex, last not descending in front, the periphery shewing nearly obsolete traces of a keel, below convex, glossy, generally opaquely milky-white about the umbilicus, which is minute and shallow; aperture diagonal, somewhat squarely-lunar, pearly within; peristome simple, acute, columellar margin very slightly triangularly dilated and reflected above. In old age, white and callous.

Diameter 0.65[1.651cm]; height 0.55[1.397cm] of an inch.

Habitat. Richmond River.— MacGillivray. Moreton Bay.— Masters.

The smoothness, want of carina, pinkish colour, and callous columella are the chief points of distinction between this and H. Moretonensis and H. subrugata.^{β}

== Distribution ==
The species is found in eastern Australia, most commonly along the coasts of Queensland and New South Wales, from Cooloola to Lismore.

== Notes and references ==
=== Notes ===
^α Text contains some minor corrections and updates; no spaces before semicolons, showing instead of shewing, "." as decimal mark instead of "·", etc...
^β In the publication Cox refers to Helix subrugata and Helix Moretonensis, meaning Nitor subrugata and Nitor moretonensis respectively. Helix subrugata and Helix moretonensis are accepted synonyms.
