= Ctenoglypta newtoni =

Conservation status
- Extinct (IUCN 2.3)

Scientific classification
- Kingdom: Animalia
- Phylum: Mollusca
- Class: Gastropoda
- Order: Stylommatophora
- Family: Euconulidae
- Genus: Ctenoglypta
- Species: †C. newtoni

Binomial name
- †Ctenoglypta newtoni Nevill, 1871

Species of gastropod

Ctenoglypta newtoni was a species of small air-breathing land snails, terrestrial pulmonate gastropod mollusks in the family Euconulidae, the hive snails. This species was endemic to Mauritius. It is now extinct.
