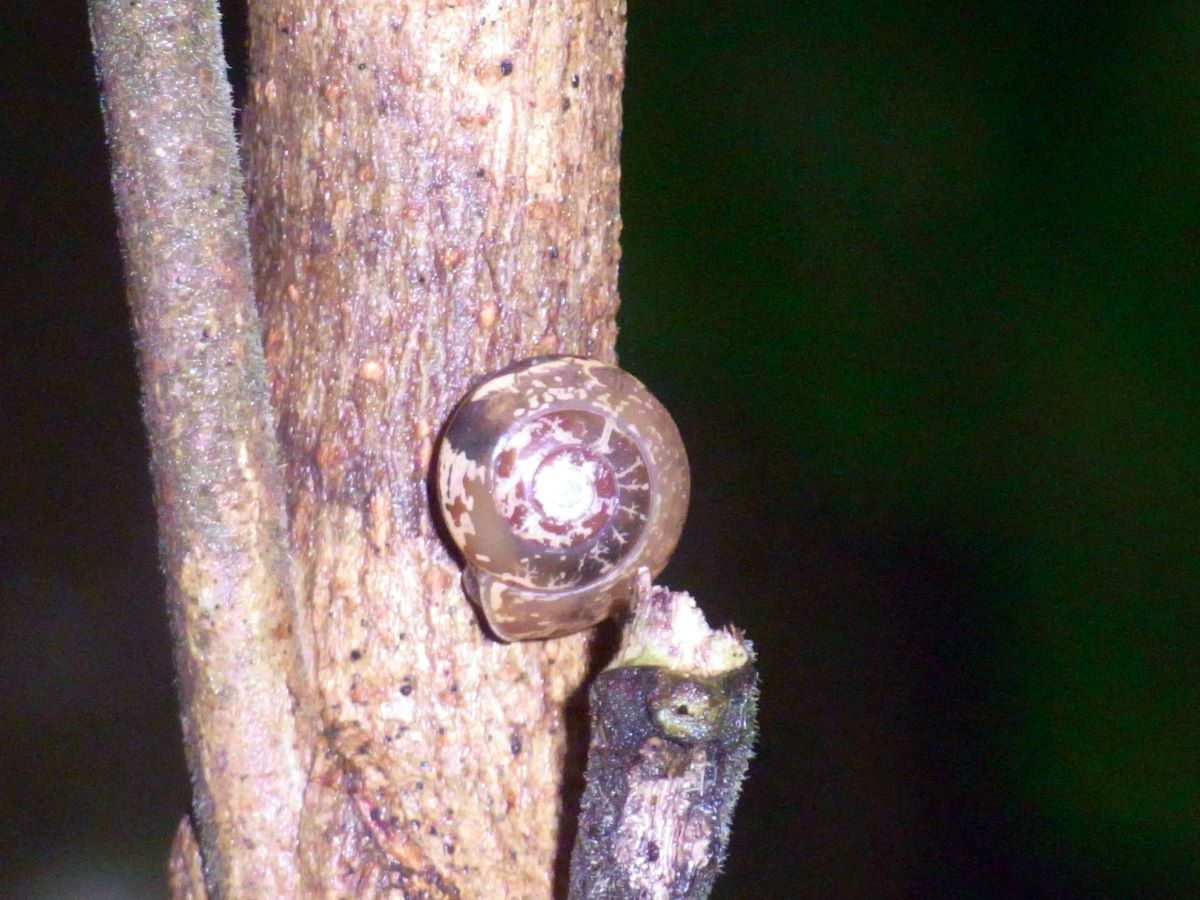
- Nitor medioximus, a rainforest snail, near Dungog, in Australia

Scientific classification
- Kingdom: Animalia
- Phylum: Mollusca
- Class: Gastropoda
- Order: Stylommatophora
- Family: Helicarionidae
- Genus: Nitor; Gude, 1911

= Nitor =

Genus of gastropods

Nitor is a genus of air-breathing land snails, terrestrial pulmonate gastropod molluscs in the family Helicarionidae.

== Species ==
Species within the genus Nitor include:

- Nitor circumcincta
- Nitor helmsianus Iredale, 1941
- Nitor medioximus Iredale, 1941
- Nitor moretonensis - Moreton land snail
- Nitor pudibunda (Cox, 1868)
- Nitor subrugata (Reeve, 1852)
- Nitor wiangariensis Hyman, 2007 - Wiangarie Forest Glass Snail
