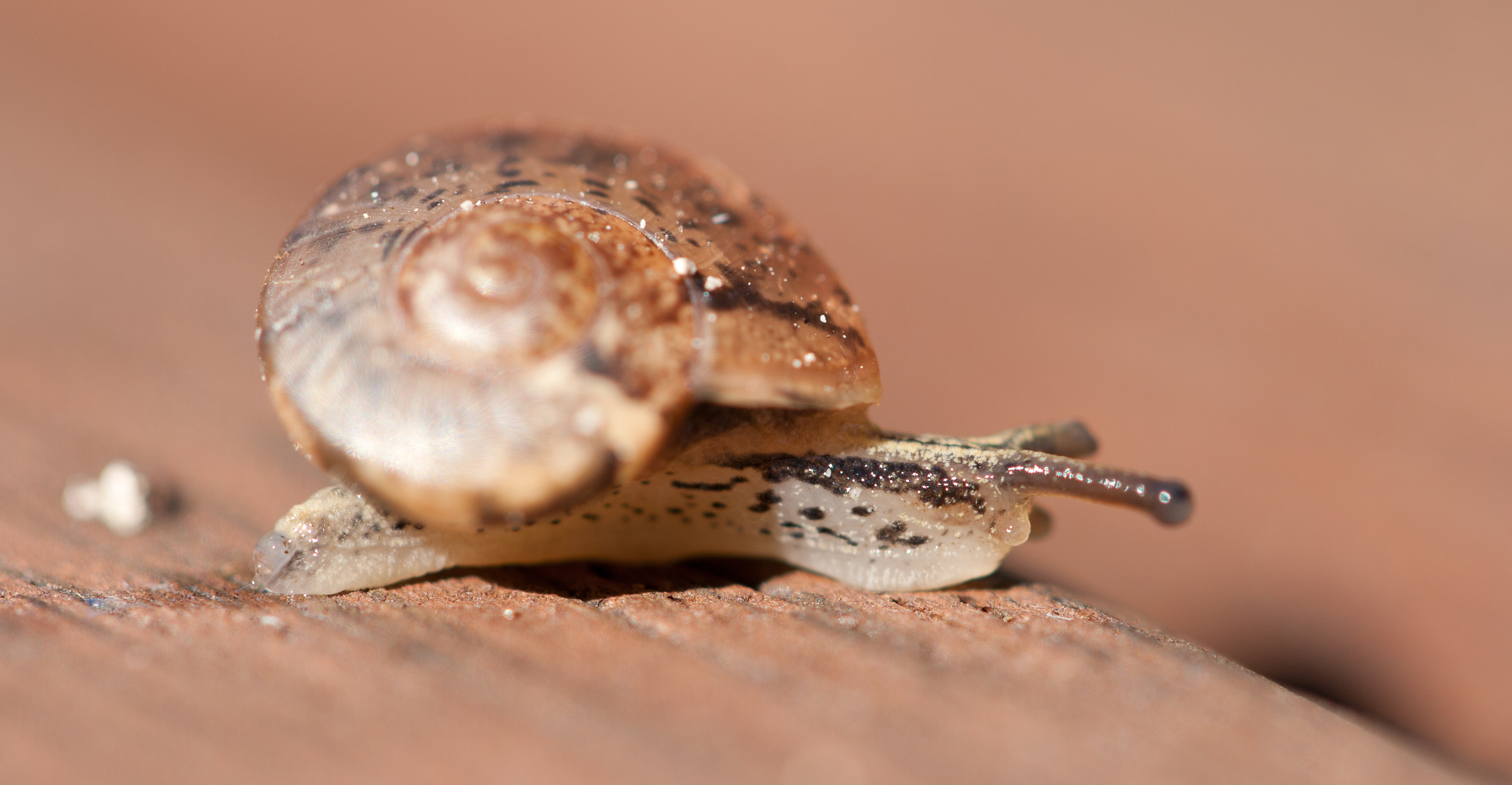
- Gudeoconcha sophiae - juvenile snail

Scientific classification
- Domain: Eukaryota
- Kingdom: Animalia
- Phylum: Mollusca
- Class: Gastropoda
- Order: Stylommatophora
- Infraorder: Limacoidei
- Superfamily: Helicarionoidea
- Family: Helicarionidae
- Genus: Gudeoconcha; Iredale, 1944
- Species: G. sophiae

Binomial name
- Gudeoconcha sophiae (Reeve, 1854)

Synonyms
- Helix sophiae Reeve, 1854

= Gudeoconcha =

Genus of land snails

Gudeoconcha is a genus of glass snails that is endemic to Australia’s Lord Howe Island in the Tasman Sea. The single species is G. sophiae (Reeve, 1854). It has four subspecies, two of which are extinct:

- G. s. sophiae (Reeve, 1854), also known as the Lord Howe Island glass snail
- G. s. magnifica Iredale, 1944, also known as the magnificent glass snail or magnificent helicarionid land snail. It is Australia's largest helicarionid snail and is listed as Critically Endangered under Australia's Environment Protection and Biodiversity Conservation Act 1999.
- G. s. conica (Brazier, 1889) (extinct – described from Blackburn Island and last collected in 1912)
- G. s. intermedia Hyman & Ponder, 2016 (Pleistocene subfossil)

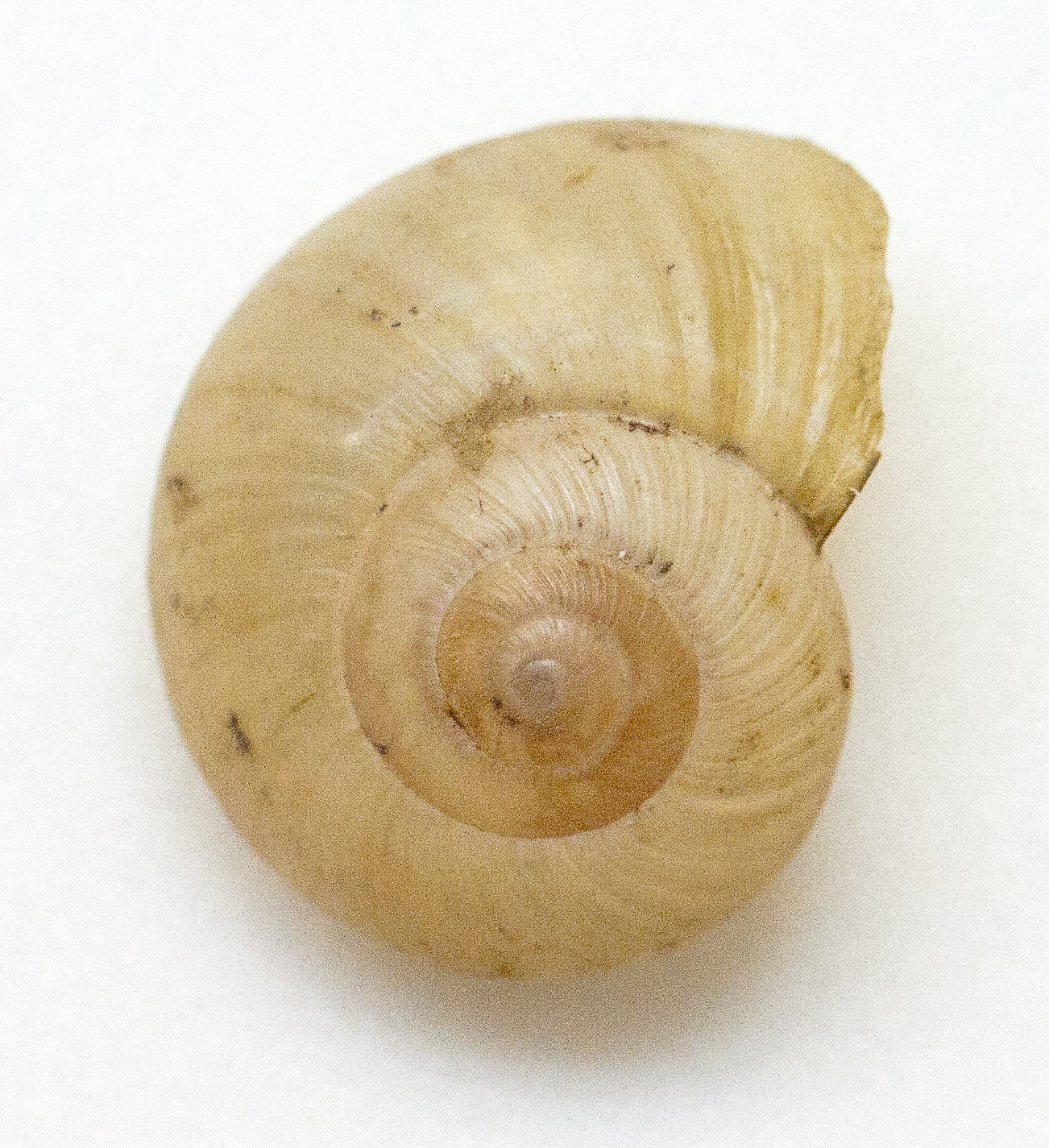
Shell from above

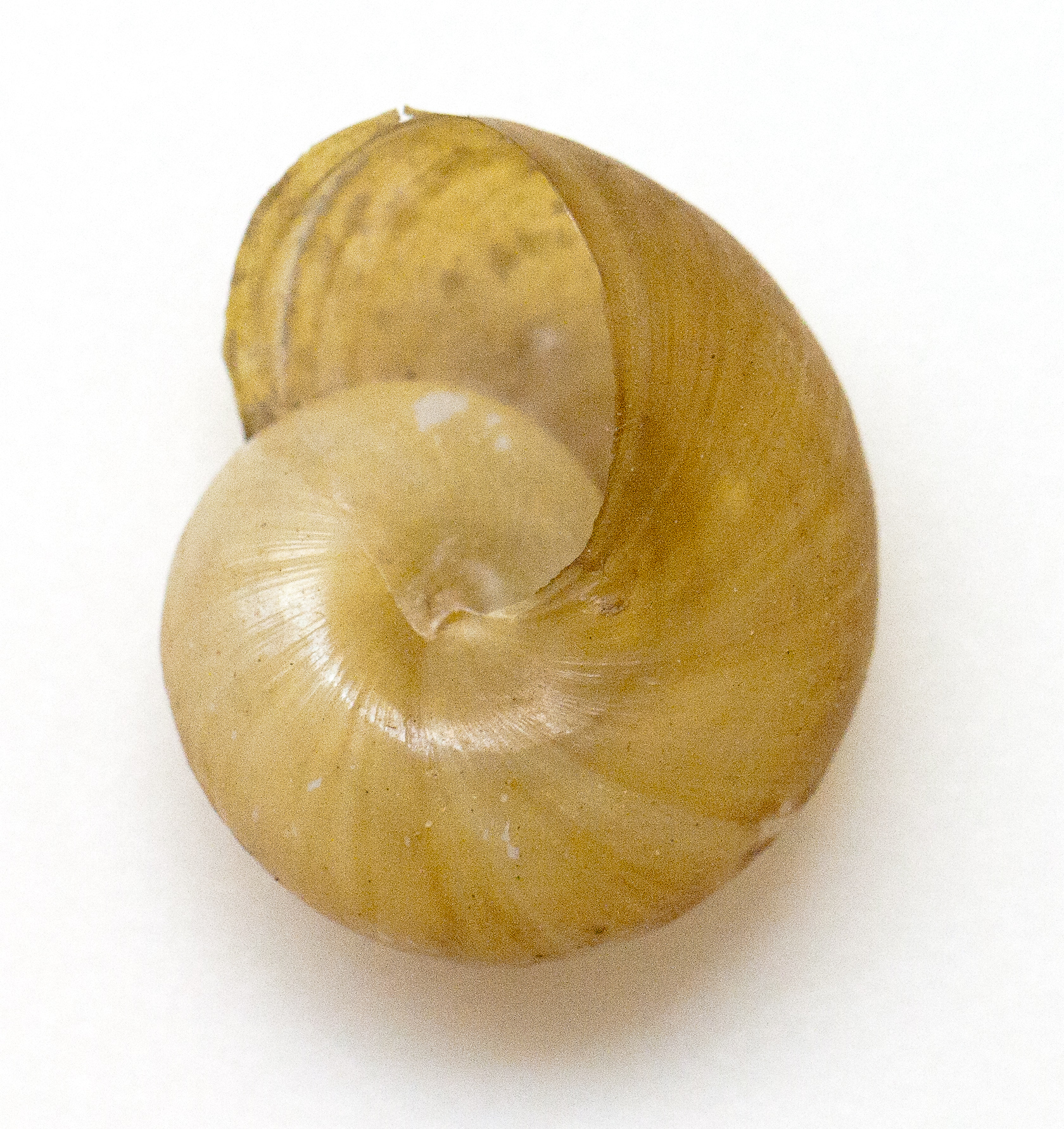
Shell from below

== Description ==
The shell of adult snails is 14.4–21.4 mm in height, with a diameter of 24.4–38.4 mm, depressedly turbinate with an angular whorl profile, sculptured with microscopic grooves and radial growth lines. It is yellowish-brown in colouration. The umbilicus is closed by reflection of the columella. The aperture is ovately lunate. The animal is yellow-brown to dark brown with spots on the side of the tail, dark bands on the neck and a small caudal horn.

== Distribution and habitat ==
The snails are found in leaf litter throughout the island, with the nominate subspecies in the lowlands and C. s. magnifica on the summits and upper slopes of the southern mountains.
