= Ctenoglypta =

Scientific classification
- Domain: Eukaryota
- Kingdom: Animalia
- Phylum: Mollusca
- Class: Gastropoda
- Order: Stylommatophora
- Family: Euconulidae
- Genus: Ctenoglypta; Ancey, 1904

Genus of gastropods

Ctenoglypta is a genus of small air-breathing land snails, terrestrial pulmonate gastropod mollusks in the family Euconulidae, the hive snails.

== Species ==
Species within the genus Ctenoglypta include:

- † Ctenoglypta newtoni
