= Menno Schilthuizen =

Dutch evolutionary biologist

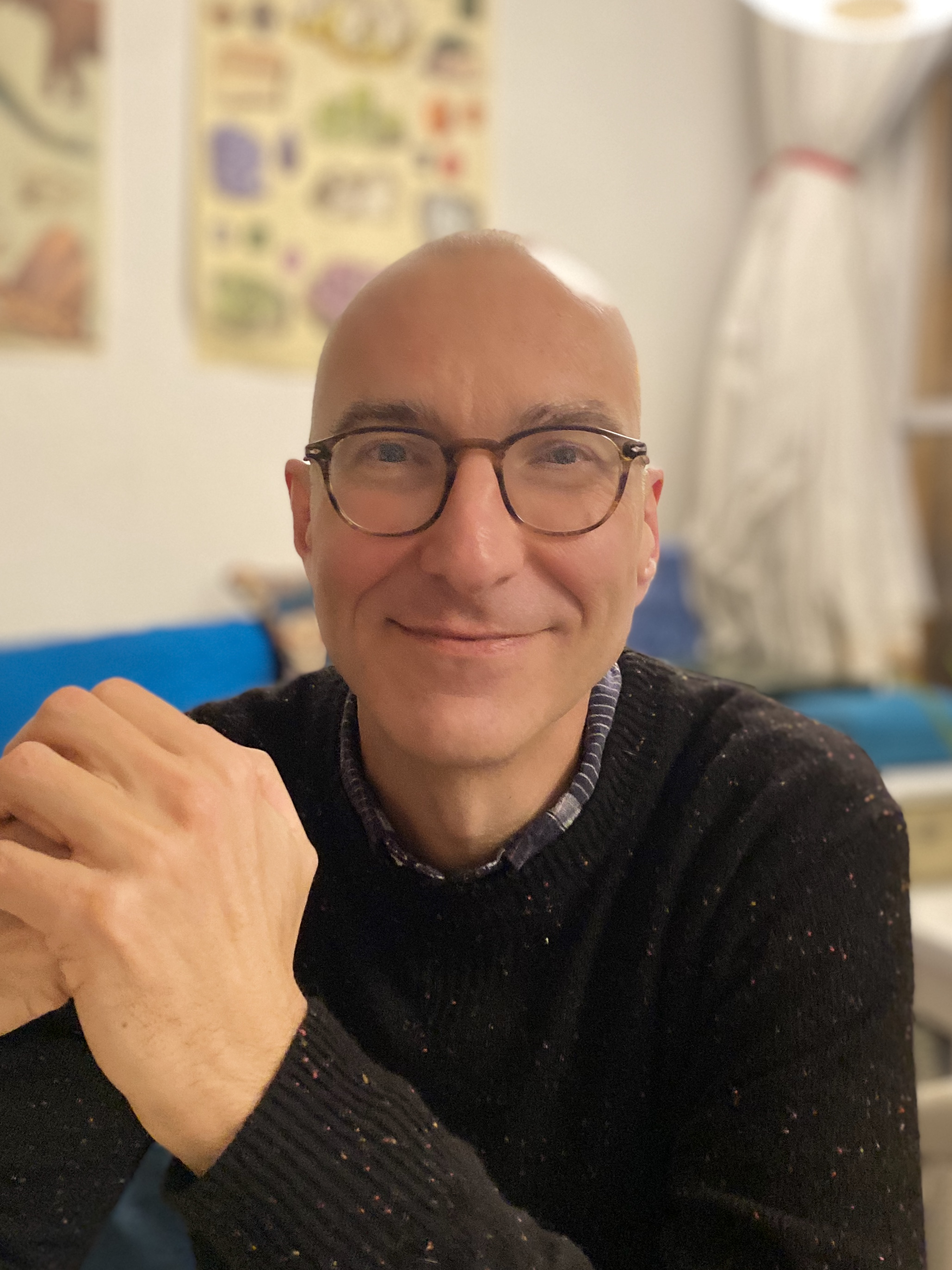
- Menno Schilthuizen in 2020
- Born: 1965 (age 60–61); Vlaardingen, Netherlands
- Citizenship: Dutch
- Education: Leiden University
- Scientific career
- Workplaces: Wageningen University, Leiden University, University of Groningen, Naturalis Biodiversity Center

Menno Schilthuizen (born 1965, Vlaardingen) is a Dutch evolutionary biologist, ecologist, and permanent research scientist at Naturalis Biodiversity Center in Leiden and a professor of evolution and biodiversity at Leiden University.

He has published numerous articles about evolution and ecology and six popular science books. In particular, his studies have concerned land snails and beetles. His Nature's Nether Regions, on the evolution of genitalia, was published by Penguin in May 2014. Translations have appeared in Dutch, German, Chinese, Greek, Japanese, French and Italian. His book, Darwin Comes to Town, is on "urban evolution", evolutionary adaptation in cities, and has appeared in 2018 in English (with Quercus [UK] and Picador [USA]), and also in Chinese, Dutch, German, Greek, Italian, Japanese, Korean, Norwegian, Polish, Russian, and Spanish. French and Turkish translations are in preparation.

Besides his academic positions, Schilthuizen works as an independent science communicator via his own company, Studio Schilthuizen. Recently, together with biospeleologist Iva Njunjić, he has begun the organisation Taxon Expeditions (and its nonprofit, Taxon Foundation), which organise field courses for citizen scientists to Borneo, Montenegro, Panama and other wild places, but also to urban centres like Amsterdam, and allows non-biologists to be involved in the discovery and naming of new species.

== Education and career ==
Menno Schilthuizen graduated from and received his PhD at Leiden University. From 1995 to 2000 he worked at Wageningen University. From 2000 to 2006 he worked at the Institute for Tropical Biology and Conservation in Sabah, Malaysian Borneo, where he studied land snail ecology and evolution in tropical forests, caves, and limestone habitats. In January 2007 he became deputy director of research at Naturalis Museum, Leiden. He stayed at this post for one and a half years, and then became permanent research scientist there. From 2007 to 2012, he was honorary professor of insect biodiversity at University of Groningen. He now holds a professorship in Character Evolution and Biodiversity at Leiden University.

== Books ==
- Frogs Flies & Dandelions: The Making of Species, 2002. Oxford University Press. 254 pages. ISBN 978-0-19-850392-7
- The Loom of Life: Unravelling Ecosystems, 2008. Springer. 168 pages. ISBN 978-3-540-68051-2
- Nature's Nether Regions: What the Sex Lives of Bugs, Birds, and Beasts Tell Us About Evolution, Biodiversity, and Ourselves. 2014. Viking / Penguin. 256 pages. ISBN 978-0-67-078591-9
- Darwin Comes to Town, 2018. Quercus Books
- Wie Wat Bewaart, 2020. Unieboek Het Spectrum. (in Dutch, with Freek Vonk)
- The Urban Naturalist, 2025. MIT Press

== Selected articles ==
- Schilthuizen et al., 2020. Craspedotropis gretathunbergae, a new species of Cyclophoridae (Gastropoda: Caenogastropoda), discovered and described on a field course to Kuala Belalong rainforest, Brunei. Biodiversity Data Journal, 8: e47484.
- Kerstes, N.A.G., T. Breeschoten, V. Kalkman & M. Schilthuizen, 2019. Snail shell colour evolution in urban heat islands detected via citizen science. Communications Biology, 2: 264.
- Merckx et al., 2015. Evolution and endemism on a young tropical mountain. Nature, 524: 347-350.
- Schilthuizen, M., 2005. 'On the origin of reproductive isolation'. BioEssays, 27: 669-670.
- Schilthuizen, M., 2000. 'Dualism and conflicts in understanding speciation'. BioEssays, 22: 1134-1141.
