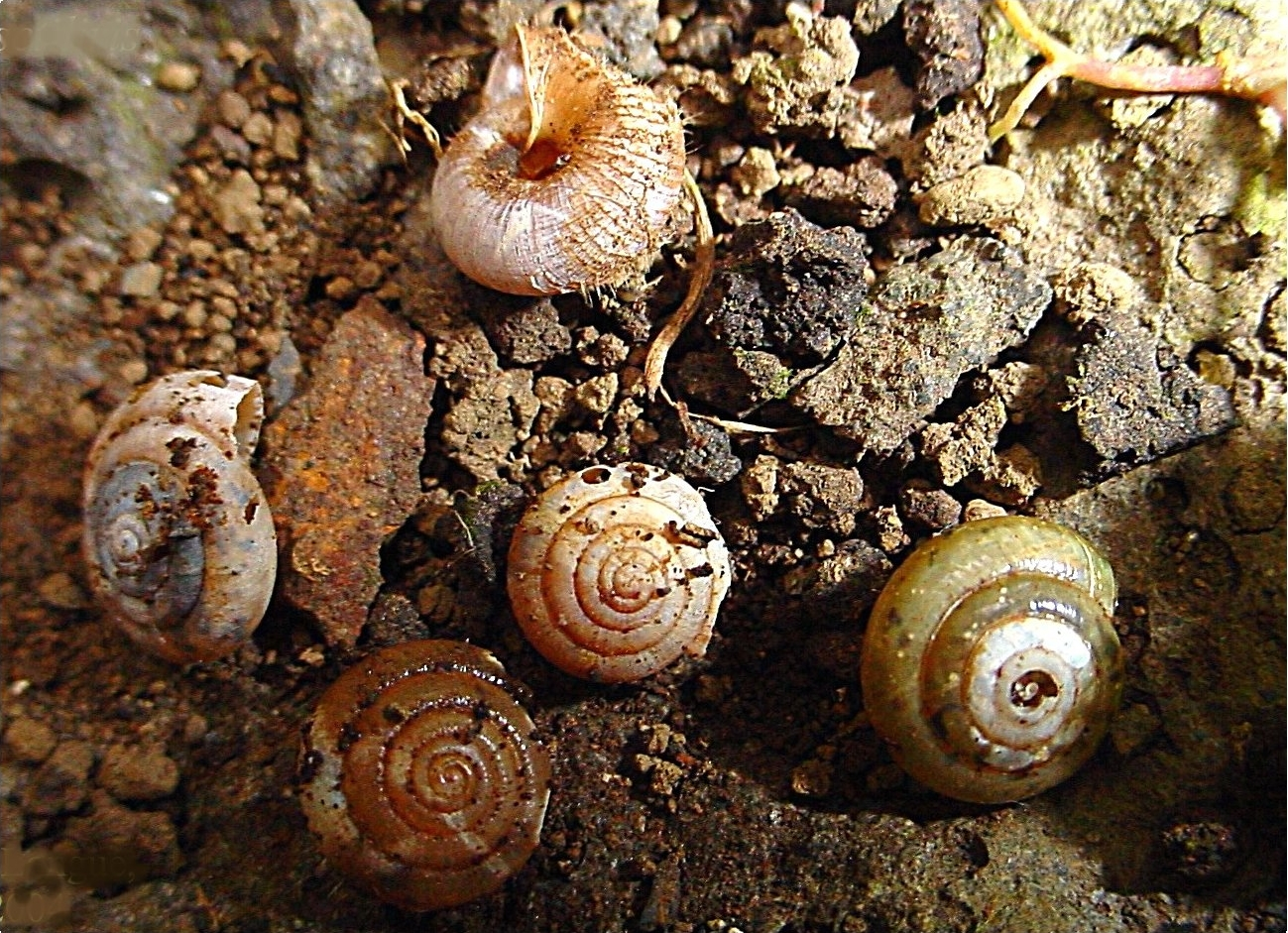
- Five worn shells of Erepta setiliris in the family Helicarionidae, at Réunion island

Scientific classification
- Kingdom: Animalia
- Phylum: Mollusca
- Class: Gastropoda
- Order: Stylommatophora
- Suborder: Helicina
- Infraorder: Limacoidei
- Superfamily: Helicarionoidea
- Family: Helicarionidae; Bourguignat, 1877

= Helicarionidae =

Family of land snails

Helicarionidae is a family of air-breathing land snails or semi-slugs, terrestrial pulmonate gastropod mollusks in the superfamily Helicarionoidea.

== Distribution ==
The distribution of Helicarionidae includes the eastern Palearctic, Malagasy, India, south-eastern Asia, Hawaii, and Australia.

== Anatomy ==
Species of snails within this family make and use love darts made of chitin.

In this family, the number of haploid chromosomes lies between 21 and 30 (according to the values in this table).

== Taxonomy ==
The family Helicarionidae is nested within the limacoid clade, as shown in the following cladogram :

- limacoid clade
  - Staffordioidea
    Staffordiidae
  - - - Dyakioidea
        Dyakiidae
      - Gastrodontoidea
        - Pristilomatidae
        - - Chronidae
          - - Euconulidae
            - Trochomorphidae
          - - Gastrodontidae
            - Oxychilidae
    - - Parmacelloidea
        - Trigonochlamydidae
        - Parmacellidae
        - Milacidae
      - - - Zonitoidea
            Zonitidae
          - Helicarionoidea
            - Helicarionidae
            - - Ariophantidae
              - Urocyclidae
        - Limacoidea
          - Vitrinidae
          - - Boettgerillidae
            - - Limacidae
              - Agriolimacidae

=== Genera ===
The following genera are recognised in the family Helicarionidae:

Subfamily Helicarioninae

- Amenixesta Iredale, 1941
- Antiquarion J. Stanisic, 2010
- Attenborougharion Hyman & Köhler, 2017
- Bathia G.C. Robson, 1914
- Brevisentis Hyman, 2007
- Burnettia J.Stanisic, 2010
- Caldwellia H. Adams, 1873
- Chalepotaxis Ancey, 1887
- Colmanarion Stanisic, 2010
- Ctenoglypta Ancey, 1904
- Ctenophila Ancey, 1882
- Cucullarion Stanisic, 1998
- Dancea Zilch, 1960
- Delinitesta Iredale, 1933
- Dendrolamellaria Preston, 1913
- Dendronitor Iredale, 1933
- Dupontia Godwin-Austen, 1908
- Echonitor Iredale, 1937
- Eddiella Stanisic, 2010
- Einasleighana Stanisic, 2010
- Elatonitor Stanisic, 2010
- Ellarion Iredale, 1941
- Epiglypta Pilsbry, 1893
- Erepta Albers, 1850
- Eufretum H.B. Baker, 1941
- Expocystis Iredale, 1937
- Fastosarion Iredale, 1933
- Fenestrarion Stanisic, 2010
- Fijia Gude, 1913
- Gudeoconcha Iredale, 1944
- Harmogenanina Germain, 1918
- Helicarion Férussac, 1821
- Howearion Iredale, 1944
- Irenella Gude, 1913
- Kalidos Gude, 1911
- Laconia Gray, 1855
- Laocaia Kuzminykh, 1999
- Levidens Hyman, 2007
- Limpidarion Hyman & Köhler, 2020
- Luinarion Iredale, 1933
- Mistarion Iredale, 1941
- Montanocystis Stanisic, 2010
- Mysticarion Iredale, 1941
- Nesonanina C.R. Boettger, 1918
- Nitor Gude, 1911
- Pachystyla Mörch, 1852
- Palmervillea Stanisic, 2010
- Parmacochlea E.A. Smith, 1884
- Parmavitrina Iredale, 1937
- Parmella H. Adams, 1867
- Parmellops Iredale, 1944
- Peloparion Iredale, 1937
- Periclocystis Iredale, 1937
- Petalochlamys Godwin-Austen, 1907
- Plegma Gude, 1911
- Pravonitor Iredale, 1937
- Pseudophasis Germain, 1918
- Pseudosaphtia de Winter, 2008
- Pseudosesara Solem, 1962
- Quirosella Clench, 1958
- Saphtia de Winter, 2008
- Sheaia Hyman, 2007
- Sigaloeista Shea & O. L. Griffiths, 2010
- Sitalarion H.B. Baker, 1941
- Stanisicarion Hyman & Ponder, 2010
- Tarocystis Iredale, 1937
- Thularion Stanisic, 1993
- Torrecystis Stanisic, 2010
- Tropicystis Stanisic, 2010
- Urazirochlamys Habe, 1946
- Vanmolia de Winter, 2008
- Westracystis Iredale, 1939
- Zagmena Iredale, 1941

Subfamily Durgellinae Godwin-Austen, 1888

- tribe Durgellini Godwin-Austen, 1888
  - Aenigmatoconcha C. Tumpeesuwan & S. Tumpeesuwan, 2017
  - Austenia G. Nevill, 1878
  - Cryptaustenia Cockerell, 1891
  - Durgella Blanford, 1863 - type genus of the subfamily Durgellinae
  - Eurychlamys Godwin-Austen, 1899
  - Holkeion Godwin-Austen, 1908
  - Ibycus Heynemann, 1863
  - Muangnua Solem, 1966
  - Nesaecia Gude, 1911
  - Pseudaustenia Cockerell, 1891
  - Rasama Laidlaw, 1932
  - Rhyssotopsis Ancey, 1887
  - Rotungia Godwin-Austen, 1918
  - Satiella W. T. Blanford & Godwin-Austen, 1908
  - Sitala H. Adams, 1865
  - Sivella W.T. Blanford, 1863
  - Sophina Benson, 1859
  - Teraia Solem, 1966
- tribe Girasiini
  - Girasia Gray, 1855 - type genus of the tribe Girasiini
- Burmochlamys Pholyotha & Panha, 2022

Unplaced genera

- Advena Gude, 1913
- Apothapsia D. T. Holyoak & G. A. Holyoak, 2020
- Kermarion Iredale, 1944
- Ovachlamys Habe, 1946
- Pittoconcha Preston, 1913
- Ubiquitarion Hyman, Lamborena & Köhler, 2017
