= List of endangered molluscs =

- Extinct in the wild (EW): 13 species
- Critically endangered (CR): 581 species
- Endangered (EN): 507 species
- Vulnerable (VU): 879 species
- Near threatened (NT, LR/cd): 535 species
- Least concern (LC): 2,437 species
- Data deficient (DD): 1,988 species
Mollusc species (IUCN, 2020.1)
- 6941 extant species have been evaluated
- 4953 of those are fully assessed (Note: excludes data deficient evaluations.)
- 2972 are not threatened at present
- 1967 to 3955 are threatened (Note: Threatened comprises CR, EN and VU. Upper estimate additionally includes DD.)
- 324 to 441 are extinct or extinct in the wild:
  - 311 extinct (EX) species (Note: Chart omits extinct (EX) species)
  - 13 extinct in the wild (EW)
  - 117 possibly extinct [CR(PE)]
  - 0 possibly extinct in the wild [CR(PEW)]

Endangered (EN) species are considered to be facing a very high risk of extinction in the wild.

In September 2016, the International Union for Conservation of Nature (IUCN) listed 507 endangered mollusc species. Of all evaluated mollusc species, 7.0% are listed as endangered. The IUCN also lists nine mollusc subspecies as endangered.

No subpopulations of molluscs have been evaluated by the IUCN.

For a species to be considered endangered by the IUCN it must meet certain quantitative criteria which are designed to classify taxa facing "a very high risk of extinction". An even higher risk is faced by critically endangered species, which meet the quantitative criteria for endangered species. Critically endangered molluscs are listed separately. There are 1088 mollusc species which are endangered or critically endangered.

Additionally 1988 mollusc species (27% of those evaluated) are listed as data deficient, meaning there is insufficient information for a full assessment of conservation status. As these species typically have small distributions and/or populations, they are intrinsically likely to be threatened, according to the IUCN. While the category of data deficient indicates that no assessment of extinction risk has been made for the taxa, the IUCN notes that it may be appropriate to give them "the same degree of attention as threatened taxa, at least until their status can be assessed".

This is a complete list of endangered mollusc species and subspecies evaluated by the IUCN.

== Gastropods ==
There are 448 species and seven subspecies of gastropod assessed as endangered.

=== Stylommatophora ===
Stylommatophora is a very diverse group that includes the majority of land snails and slugs. There are 187 species and two subspecies in the order Stylommatophora assessed as endangered.

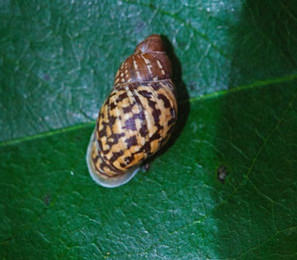
A shell of Eua zebrina

A live specimen of Samoa diaphana

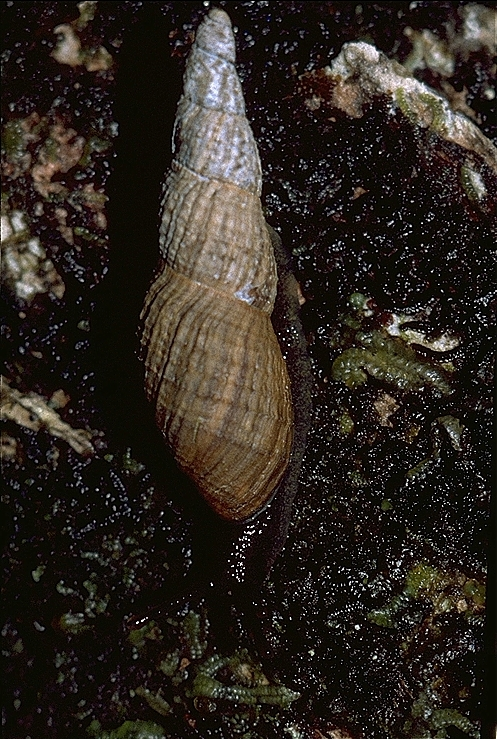
A live specimen of Newcombia cumingi

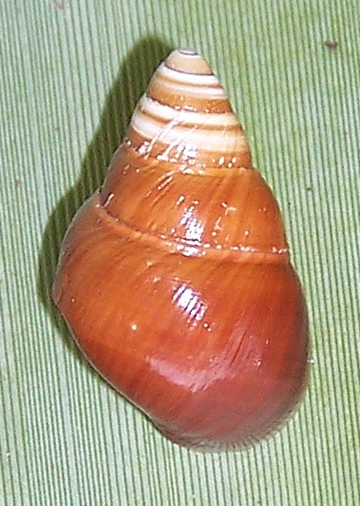
A shell of Partulina variabilis

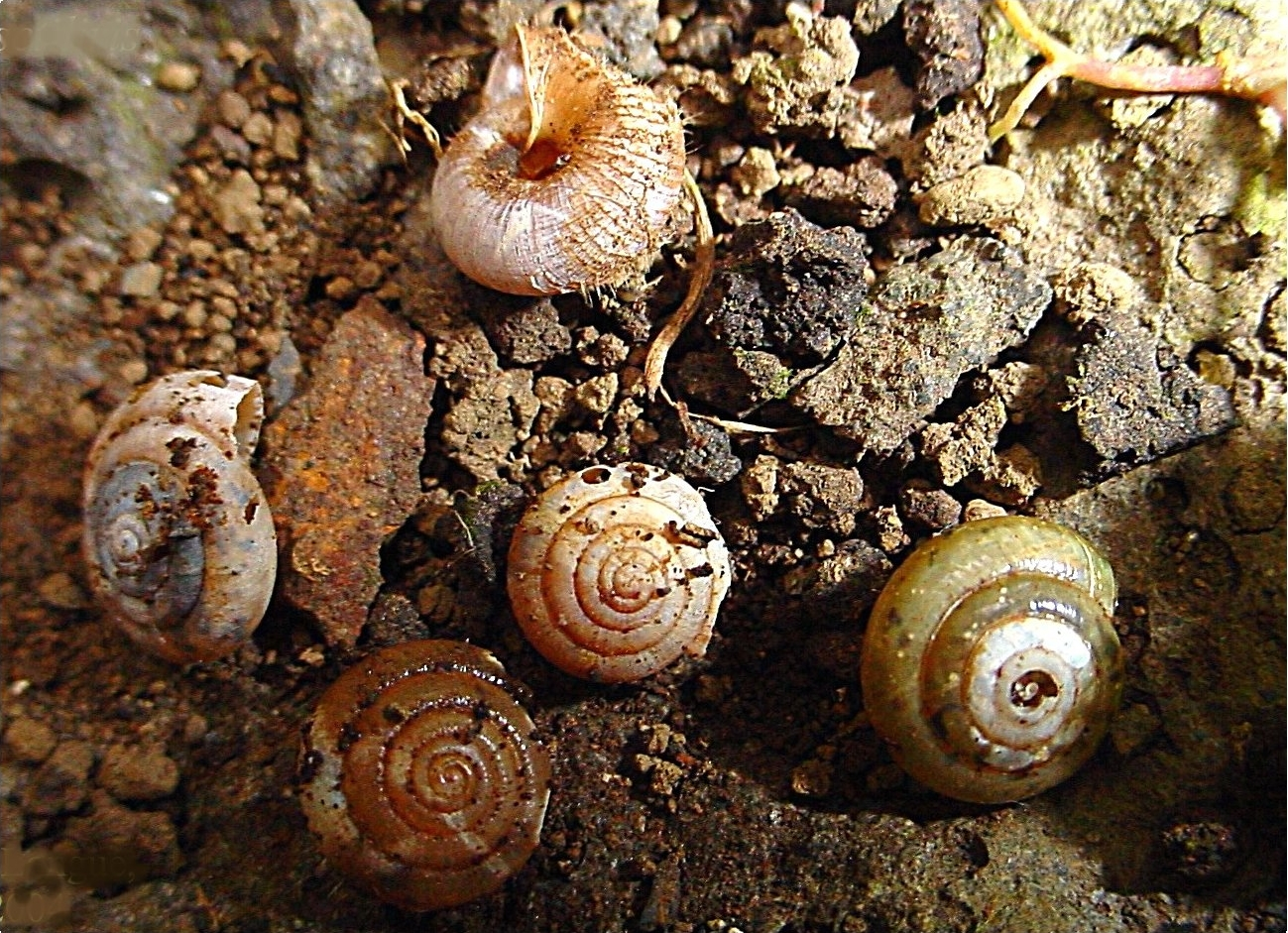
A gathering of live specimens of Ctenophila setiliris in Réunion

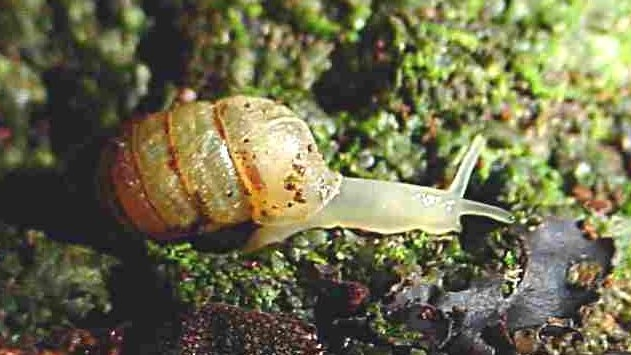
A live individual of Gonospira uvula

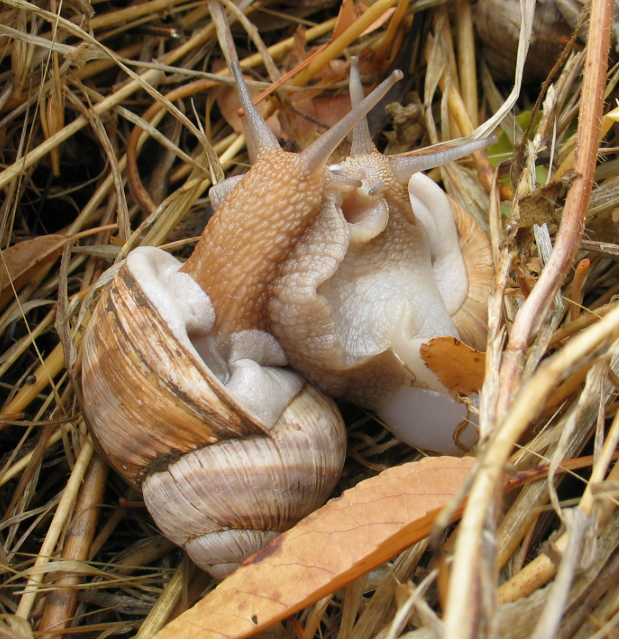
Live individuals of Helix texta

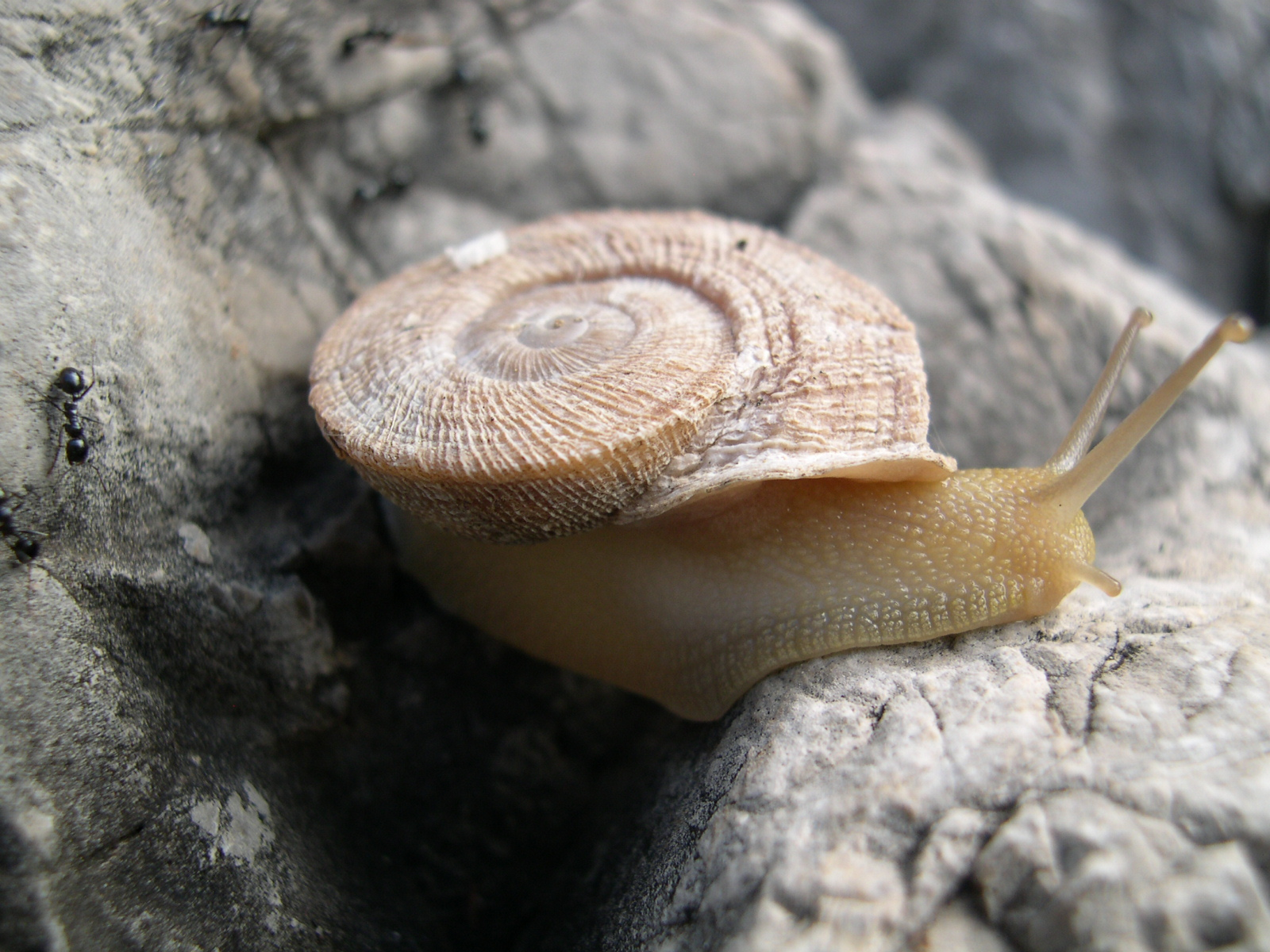
A live specimen Iberus gualtieranus

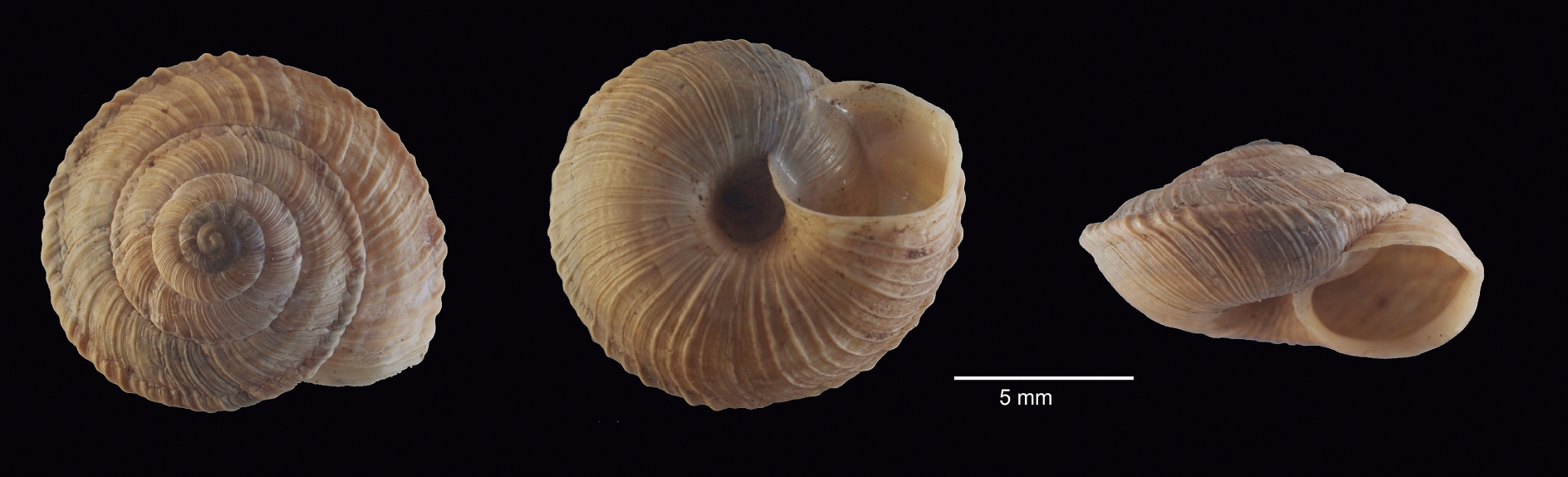
Different views of a shell of Xerocrassa montserratensis

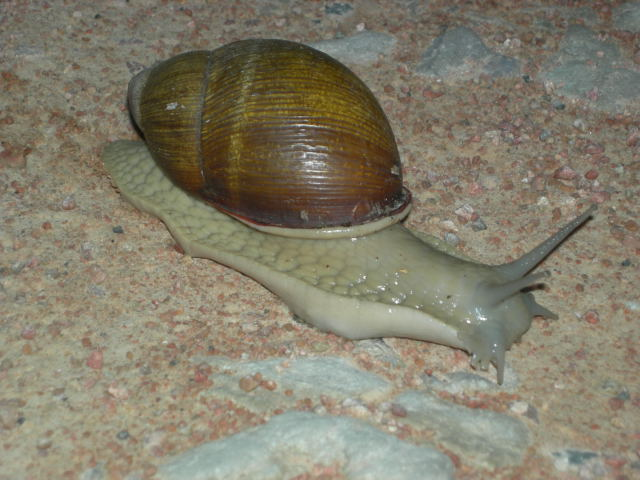
A live individual of Megalobulimus parafragilior

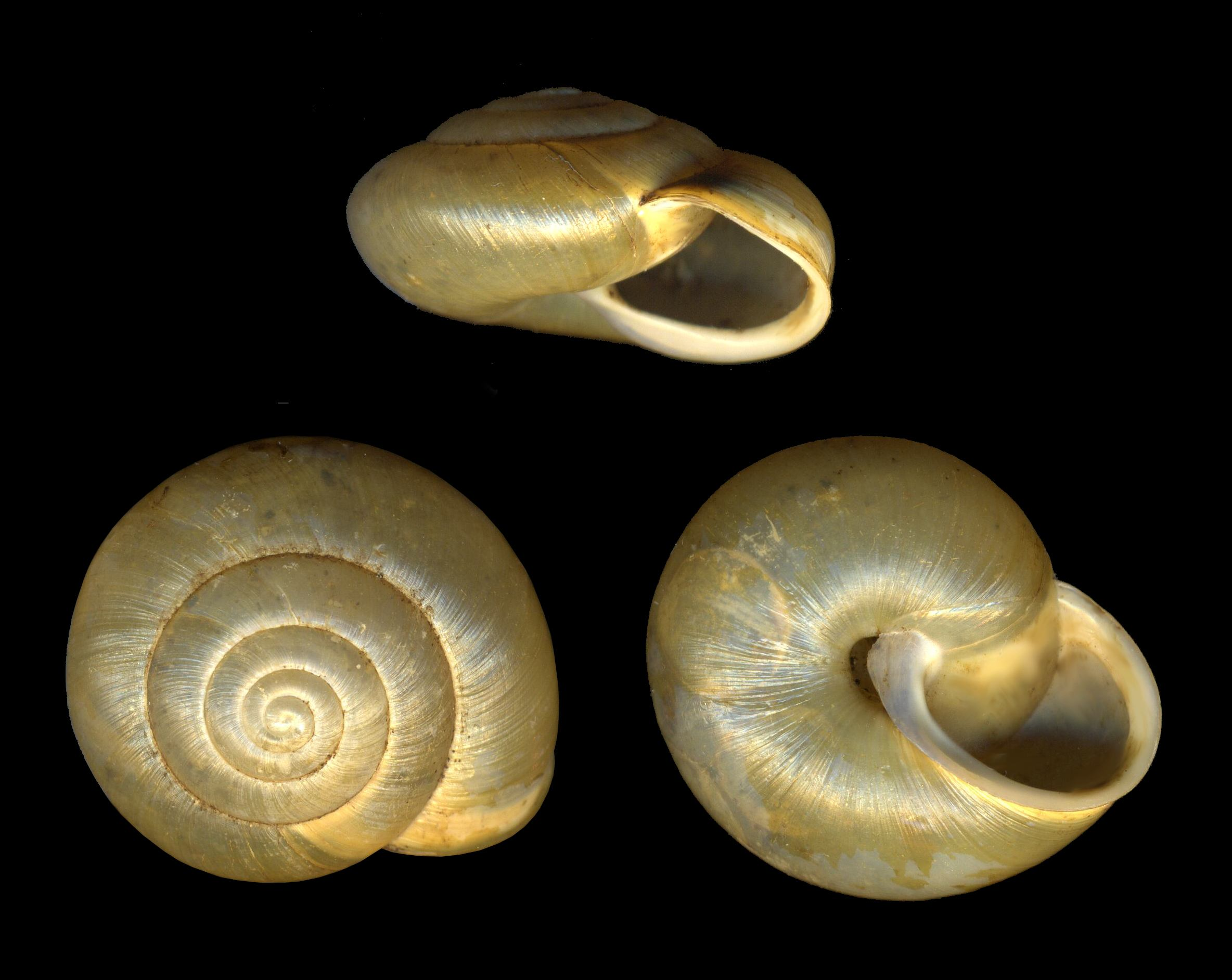
Different views of a shell of Patera clenchi

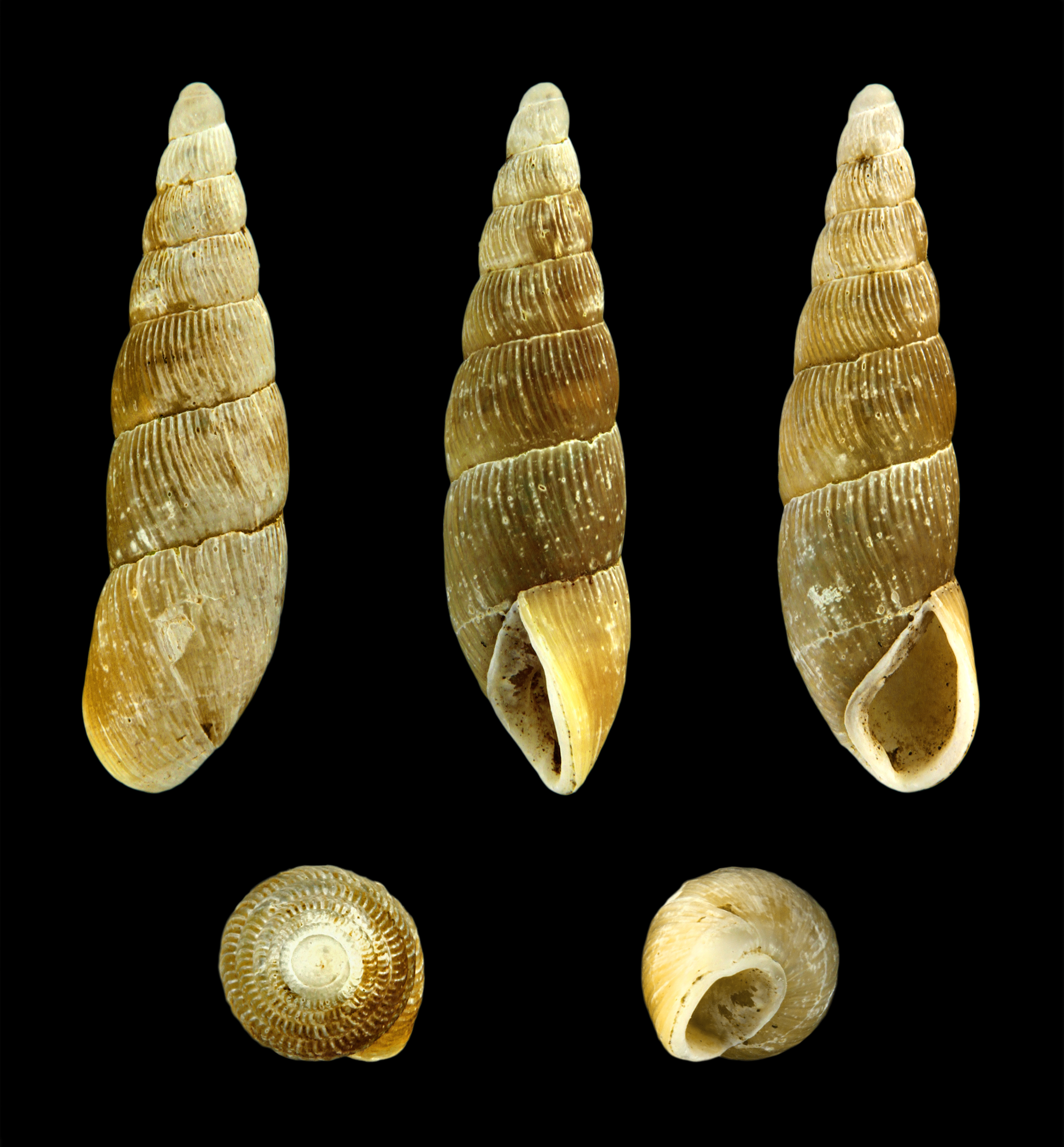
Different views of a shell of Sculptiferussacia clausiliaeformis

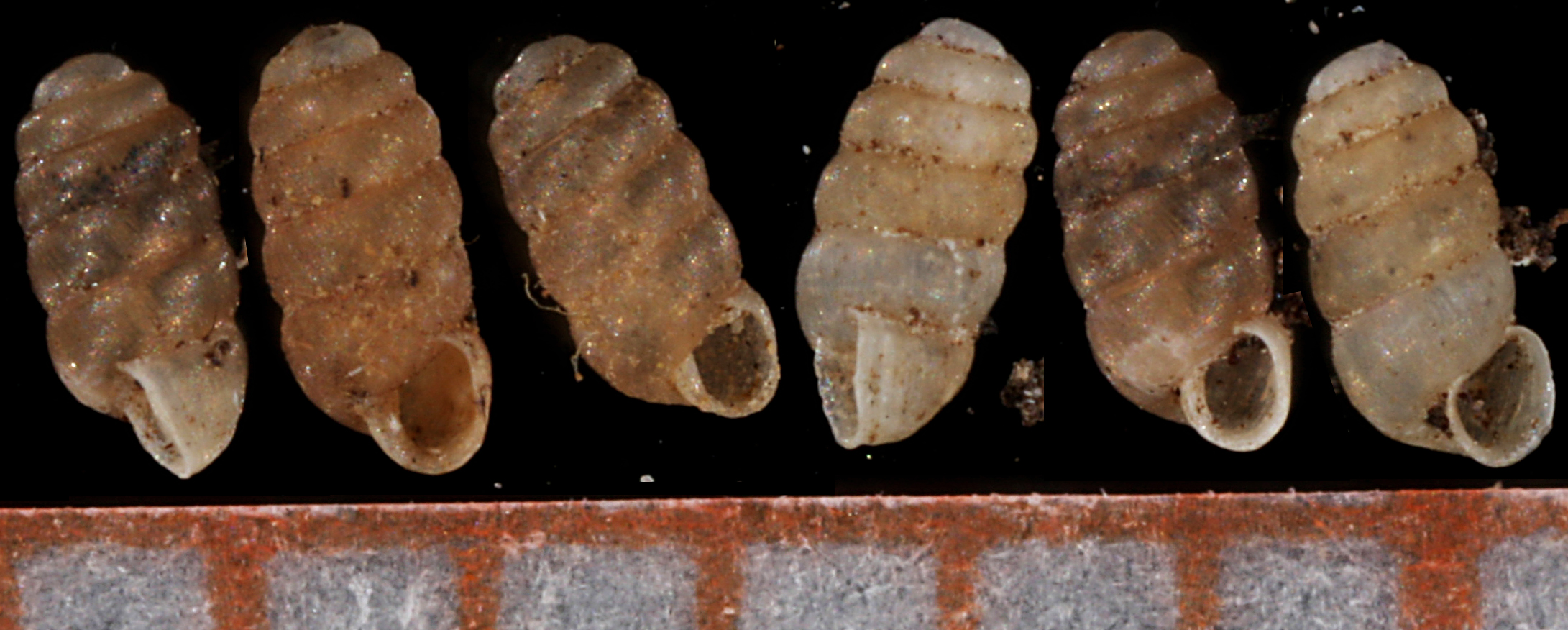
Several empty shells of Truncatellina arcyensis

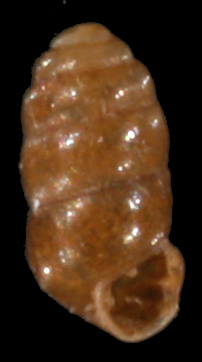
A shell of Vertigo heldi

==== Partulids ====
- Eua zebrina
- Partula auraniana
- Partula thetis
- Samoana conica
- Samoana diaphana
- Samoana thurstoni

==== Achatinellids ====
- Elasmias ovatulum
- Newcombia canaliculata
- Newcombia cumingi
- Newcombia lirata
- Newcombia perkinsi
- Newcombia pfeifferi
- Newcombia sulcata
- Partulina mighelsiana
- Partulina perdix
- Partulina physa
- Partulina proxima
- Partulina redfieldi
- Partulina semicarinata
- Partulina splendida (splendid partulina)
- Partulina tappaniana
- Partulina tessellata
- Partulina variabilis
- Perdicella helena

==== Cerastids ====
- Pachnodus becketti
- Pachnodus fregatensis
- Pachnodus kantilali
- Pachnodus niger
- Pachnodus ornatus

==== Endodontids ====
- Aaadonta constricta
- Aaadonta fuscozonata
- Hirasea acutissima
- Hirasea chichijimana
- Hirasea diplomphalus
- Hirasea insignis
- Hirasea operculina
- Thaumatodon hystricelloides
- Thaumatodon subdaedalea

==== Charopids ====
- Ba humbugi
- Orangia cookei
- Orangia sporadica
- Pilula mahesiana
- Ptychodon schuppi
- Radioconus riochcoensis
- Radiodiscus amdenus
- Semperdon uncatus
- Sinployea princei
- Sinployea rotumana
- Trachycystis haygarthi

==== Helicarionids ====
- Advena charon
- Dolapex amiculus
- Erepta odontina
- Kaliella aldabra
- Lutilodix imitratrix
- Mathewsoconcha belli

==== Orthalicids ====
Species

- Boninena callistoderma
- Boninena hiraseana
- Boninena ogasawarae
- Bothriembryon perobesus
- Bothriembryon praecelcus
- Bulimulus cinerarius
- Bulimulus cucullinus
- Bulimulus nux
- Bulimulus olla
- Bulimulus perspectivus
- Bulimulus planospira
- Bulimulus rugulosus
- Placostylus graeffei
- Placostylus guanensis
- Placostylus hoyti
- Placostylus kantavuensis
- Placostylus ochrostoma
- Placostylus seemanni

Subspecies

- Orthalicus reses reses (Stock Island tree snail)

==== Euconulids ====
- Ctenophila caldwelli
- Ctenophila setiliris
- Dancea rodriguezensis
- Dupontia perlucida
- Hacrochlamys lineolatus
- Lamprocystis hahajimana

==== Streptaxids ====
Species

- Careoradula perelegans
- Edentulina moreleti
- Glabrennea gardineri
- Gonospira deshayesi
- Gonospira uvula
- Gulella antelmeana
- Gulella aprosdoketa
- Gulella claustralis
- Gulella taitensis
- Imperturbatia constans
- Imperturbatia violescens
- Microstrophia modesta

Subspecies

- Tayloria urguessensis subangulata

==== Helicids ====
- Arianta chamaeleon
- Codringtonia codringtonii (rock snail)
- Cornu mazzullii
- Helix godetiana
- Helix texta
- Helix valentini
- Hemicycla pouchadan
- Iberus gualtieranus
- Lampadia webbiana
- Marmorana nebrodensis
- Tacheocampylaea acropachia
- Tacheocampylaea cyrniaca
- Tacheocampylaea tacheoides
- Theba grasseti

==== Hygromiids ====
- Actinella carinofausta
- Canariella eutropis
- Canariella huttereri
- Candidula grovesiana
- Candidula setubalensis
- Caseolus calvus
- Cernuella rugosa
- Discula pulvinata
- Discula tectiformis
- Geomitra moniziana
- Geomitra tiarella
- Helicella stiparum
- Leptaxis caldeirarum
- Leptaxis minor
- Leptaxis wollastoni
- Monacha auturica
- Pyrenaearia organiaca
- Serratorotula coronata
- Trochulus biconicus
- Xerocrassa edmundi
- Xerocrassa montserratensis
- Xerocrassa moraguesi
- Xerosecta adolfi
- Xerotricha gasulli
- Xerotricha pavida

==== Other stylommatophoran species ====
- Ampelita fulgurata
- Ampelita julii
- Purcell's hunter slug (Chlamydephorus purcelli)
- Cryptazeca kobelti
- Eucobresia pegorarii
- Euonyma curtissima
- Helicodonta wilhelminae
- Kern shoulderband (Helminthoglypta callistoderma)
- Lampedusa imitatrix
- Leiostyla concinna
- Leiostyla falknerorum
- Leptachatina lepida
- Macrochlamys sp. 'White, umbilicate'
- Megalobulimus fragilion
- Megalobulimus lopesi
- Megalobulimus parafragilior
- Clench's middle-toothed land snail (Mesodon clenchi)
- Microcystina sp. 'Kien Luong'
- Napaeus doliolum
- Napaeus myosotis
- Napaeus nanodes
- Obelus discogranulatus
- Occirhenea georgiana
- Ouagapia perryi
- Parmacella tenerifensis
- Quickia aldabrensis
- Sculptiferussacia clausiliaeformis
- Stylodonta studeriana
- Subuliniscus arambourgi
- Succinea piratarum
- Succinea quadrasi
- Thapsia buraensis
- Thapsia snelli
- Kaputar pink slug (Triboniophorus sp. 'Kaputar')
- Trochomorpha albostriata
- Trochomorpha apia
- Trochomorpha tavinniensis
- Trochomorpha transarata
- Truncatellina arcyensis
- Vallonia suevica
- Vertigo heldi
- Victaphanta compacta
- Videna oleacina
- Zonitoides jaccetanicus

=== Littorinimorpha ===
There are 147 littorinimorph species and three subspecies assessed as endangered.

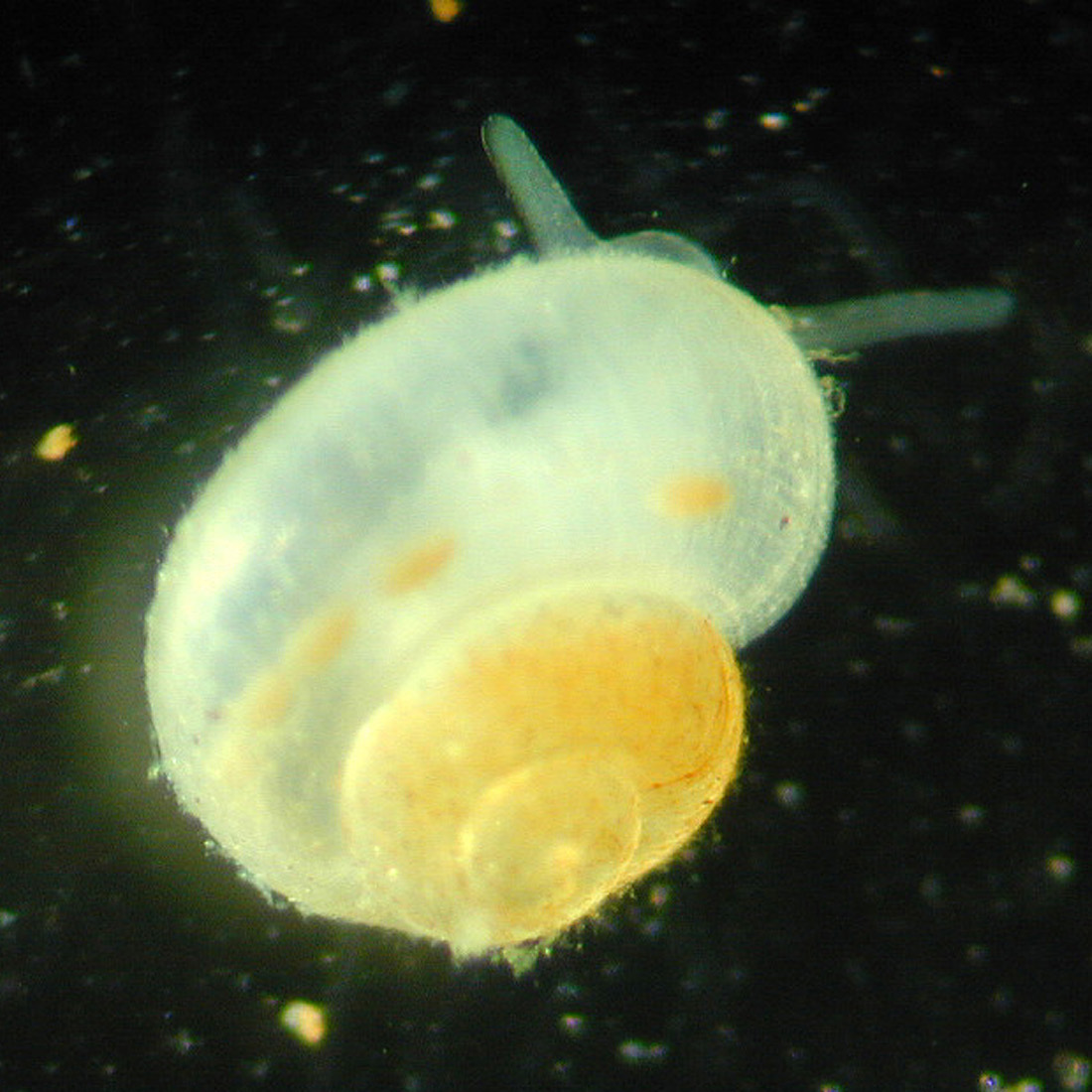
A live individual of Antrobia culveri

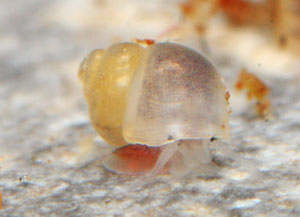
A live specimen of Belgrandiella wawrai

==== Hydrobiids ====
- Alzoniella asturica
- Alzoniella delmastroi
- Alzoniella edmundi
- Alzoniella finalina
- Antrobia culveri (Tumbling Creek cavesnail)
- Beddomeia capensis
- Beddomeia fallax
- Belgrandia conoidea
- Belgrandia lusitanica
- Belgrandiella adsharica
- Belgrandiella aulaei
- Belgrandiella wawrai
- Boetersiella sturmi
- Bracenica spiridoni
- Bythinella bavarica
- Bythinella carinulata
- Bythinella viridis
- Bythinella zyvionteki
- Bythiospeum bormanni
- Bythiospeum clessini
- Bythiospeum elseri
- Bythiospeum klemmi
- Bythiospeum labiatum
- Bythiospeum lamperti
- Bythiospeum nocki
- Bythiospeum noricum
- Bythiospeum sterkianum
- Bythiospeum taxisi
- Daphniola exigua
- Falsipyrgula barroisi
- Falsipyrgula pfeiferi
- Fonscochlea aquatica
- Fonscochlea billakalina
- Giustia bodoni
- Giustia gofasi
- Giustia janai
- Giustia midarensis
- Graecoanatolica dinarica
- Graecoanatolica lacustristurca
- Graecoanatolica pamphylica
- Graecoanatolica tenuis
- Graziana cezairensis
- Graziana klagenfurtensis
- Graziana provincialis
- Graziana trinitatis
- Hadopyrgus anops
- Hadopyrgus brevis
- Hauffenia jadertina
- Hauffenia kerschneri
- Hauffenia nesemanni
- Hauffenia wienerwaldensis
- Heideella knidirii
- Heideella sp. 'salahi'
- Hemistomia pusillior
- Heterocyclus perroquini
- Heterocyclus petiti
- Horatia sp. 'aghbalensis'
- Horatia sp. 'haasei'
- Hydrobia guyenoti
- Hydrobia maroccana
- Hydrobia plena
- Hydrobia schoutedeni
- Iglica bagliviaeformis
- Islamia henrici
- Islamia pallida
- Jardinella acuminata
- Jardinella exigua
- Jardinella jesswiseae
- Jardinella pallida
- Jardinella zeidlerorum
- Leiorhagium montfaouense
- Leiorhagium ruali
- Leptopyrgus manneringi
- Lyhnidia gjorgjevici
- Maroccopsis agadirensis
- Ocmulgee marstonia (Marstonia agarhecta)
- Mercuria meridionalis
- Mercuria vindilica
- Meridiopyrgus murihiku
- Moominia willii
- Narentiana vjetrenicae
- Ohridohauffenia depressa
- Ohridohauffenia rotonda
- Ohridohauffenia sanctinaumi
- Ohridohoratia carinata
- Ohrigocea karevi
- Ohrigocea miladinovorum
- Ohrigocea ornata
- Ohrigocea samuili
- Ohrigocea stankovici
- Parabythinella macedonica
- Paxillostium nanum
- Pezzolia radapalladis
- Plagigeyeria deformata
- Plagigeyeria zetaprotogona
- Pseudamnicola geldiayana
- Pseudamnicola lucensis
- Pseudamnicola solitaria
- Pyrgohydrobia prespaensis
- Duckwater pyrg (Pyrgulopsis aloba)
- San Bernardino springsnail (Pyrgulopsis bernardina)
- Transverse grand pyrg (Pyrgulopsis cruciglans)
- Naegele springsnail (Pyrgulopsis metcalfi)
- Salenthydrobia ferrerii
- Sardohoratia islamioides
- Saxurinator montenegrinus
- Sipun cave water snail (Saxurinator sketi)
- Spathogyna fezi
- Tarraconia rolani
- Tongapyrgus subterraneus
- Trochidrobia inflata
- Vinodolia fiumana
- Vinodolia fluviatilis
- Vinodolia gluhodolica
- Vinodolia scutarica

==== Bithyniids ====
Species

- Bithynia pesicii
- Bithynia prespensis
- Bithynia skadarskii
- Bithynia zeta
- Funduella incisa
- Gabbiella barthi
- Gabbiella spiralis
- Gabbiella tchadiensis
- Gabbiella verdcourti
- Liminitesta sulcata
- Pseudobithynia levantica
- Pseudobithynia trichonis

Subspecies

- Gabbiella humerosa alberti
- Gabbiella humerosa edwardi
- Gabbiella humerosa kyogae

==== Assimineids ====
- Pecos assiminea (Assiminea pecos)
- Cape Leeuwin snail (Austroassiminea letha)
- Eussoia inopina
- Omphalotropis hieroglyphica
- Omphalotropis subsoluta

==== Pomatiopsids ====
- Fenouilia kreitneri
- Pachydrobia zilchi
- Tomichia differens
- Tomichia ventricosa
- Tomichia zwellendamensis

==== Other Littorinimorpha species ====
- Cremnoconchus carinatus
- Cremnoconchus syhadrensis
- Heleobia foxianensis
- Paladilhia gloeeri
- Spiralix valenciana
- Stenothyra huaimoi
- Tropidophora articulata
- Tropidophora deburghiae
- Tropidophora gardineri
- Devil tryonia (Tryonia diaboli)

=== Sorbeoconcha ===
- Bathanalia howesi
- Brotia pageli
- Cleopatra athiensis
- Cleopatra mweruensis
- Cleopatra pilula
- Cleopatra rugosa
- Walnut elimia (Elimia bellula)
- Hirthia littorina
- Spiny river snail (Io fluvialis)
- Juga occata
- Painted rocksnail (Leptoxis taeniata)
- Melanoides crawshayi
- Melanoides kinshassaensis
- Melanoides wagenia
- Melanopsis dircaena
- Melanopsis etrusca
- Melanopsis letourneuxi
- Melanopsis magnifica
- Melanopsis mourebeyensis
- Melanopsis scalaris
- Paludomus ajanensis
- Paludomus messageri
- Rough hornsnail (Pleurocera foremani)
- Potadoma angulata
- Potadoma nyongensis
- Potadoma ponthiervillensis
- Potadoma trochiformis
- Potadoma zenkeri
- Potadomoides pelseneeri
- Pseudocleopatra bennikei
- Semisulcospira morii

=== Architaenioglossa ===
Species

- Adelopoma stolli
- Anulotaia forcarti
- Arinia biplicata
- Arinia streptaxiformis
- Bellamya contracta
- Bellamya crawshayi
- Bellamya phthinotropis
- Bellamya robertsoni
- Boucardicus carylae
- Boucardicus culminans
- Boucardicus curvifolius
- Boucardicus delicatus
- Boucardicus divei
- Boucardicus esetrae
- Boucardicus magnilobatus
- Boucardicus mahermanae
- Boucardicus randalanai
- Boucardicus victorhernandezi
- Cipangopaludina dianchiensis
- Cyathopoma picardense
- Cyclophorus sp. 'cave'
- Cyclophorus sp. 'Periomphalic furrow'
- Diplommatina inflatula
- Diplommatina pyramis
- Fijiopoma liberata
- Gonatorhaphe intercostata
- Gonatorhaphe stricta
- Heterogen longispira
- Hungerfordia pelewensis
- Lanistes alexandri
- Lanistes nyassanus
- Lanistes solidus
- Macropalaina pomatiaeformis
- Margarya bicostata
- Margarya mansuyi
- Margarya melanoides
- Notopala sublineata
- Opisthostoma dormani
- Opisthostoma simplex
- Palaina taviensis
- Palaina wilsoni
- Tulotoma (Tulotoma magnifica)

Subspecies

- Bellamya unicolor abyssinicus
- Maizania hildebrandti thikensis

=== Cycloneritimorpha ===
- Helicina rostrata
- Black nerite (Theodoxus prevostianus)
- Metkovich cave nerite (Theodoxus subterrelictus)
- Striped nerite (Theodoxus transversalis)

=== Hygrophila species ===
There are 22 Hygrophila species assessed as endangered.

==== Planorbids ====
- Africanogyrus rodriguezensis
- Africanogyrus starmuehlneri
- Ancylus lapicidus
- Ancylus tapirulus
- Biomphalaria tchadiensis
- Bulinus camerunensis
- Bulinus succinoides
- Ceratophallus concavus
- Ferrissia kavirondica
- Ferrissia toroensis
- Gyraulus cockburni
- Gyraulus crenophilus
- Gyraulus fontinalis
- Gyraulus meierbrooki
- Gyraulus stankovici
- Gyraulus trapezoides
- Planorbis macedonicus

==== Lymnaeids ====
- Lymnaea maroccana
- Radix pinteri
- Radix skutaris
- Shortspire pondsnail (Stagnicola idahoensis)
- Stagnicola kayseris

=== Neogastropoda ===
- Conus ateralbus
- Conus belairensis
- Conus bruguieresi
- Conus cloveri
- Conus crotchii
- Conus cuneolus
- Conus echinophilus
- Conus fernandesi
- Conus hybridus
- Conus mercator
- Conus unifasciatus

=== Other gastropod species ===
- Pinto abalone (Haliotis kamtschatkana)
- Caterpillar slug (Laevicaulis haroldi)
- Valvata klemmi
- Valvata montenegrina

== Bivalvia ==
There are 57 species and two subspecies in the class Bivalvia assessed as endangered.

=== Unionida ===
There are 54 species and two subspecies in the order Unionoida assessed as endangered.

==== Margaritiferids ====
- Spectacle case pearly mussel (Cumberlandia monodonta)
- Margaritifera homsensis
- Margaritifera laosensis
- Freshwater pearl mussel (Margaritifera margaritifera)
- Alabama pearl shell (Margaritifera marrianae)

==== Unionids ====
Species

- Altamaha arcmussel (Alasmidonta arcula)
- Cumberland elktoe (Alasmidonta atropurpurea)
- Southern elktoe (Alasmidonta triangulata)
- Anodonta pseudodopsis
- Wheeler's pearly mussel (Arcidens wheeleri)
- Coelatura stagnorum
- Cristaria truncata
- Salina mucket (Disconaias salinasensis)
- Chipola slabshell (Elliptio chipolaensis)
- Altamaha spinymussel (Elliptio spinosa)
- Oyster mussel (Epioblasma capsaeformis)
- Fine-rayed pigtoe pearly mussel (Fusconaia cuneolus)
- Narrow pigtoe (Fusconaia escambia)
- Triangle pigtoe (Fusconaia lananensis)
- Atlantic pigtoe (Fusconaia masoni)
- Finelined pocketbook (Hamiota altilis)
- Lamprotula contritus
- Lamprotula ponderosa
- Yellow lampmussel (Lampsilis cariosa)
- Higgins' eye pearly mussel (Lampsilis higginsii)
- Arkansas fatmucket (Lampsilis powellii)
- Neosho mucket (Lampsilis rafinesqueana)
- Alabama moccasinshell (Medionidus acutissimus)
- Coosa moccasinshell (Medionidus parvulus)
- Modellnaia siamensis
- Round ebonyshell (Obovaria rotulata)
- Oxynaia diespiter
- Oxynaia micheloti
- Sheepnose (Plethobasus cyphyus)
- Southern clubshell (Pleurobema decisum)
- Oval pigtoe (Pleurobema pyriforme)
- Heavy pigtoe (Pleurobema taitianum)
- Slab-sided pearly mussel (Pleuronaia dolabelloides)
- Texas heelsplitter (Potamilus amphichaenus)
- Inflated heelsplitter (Potamilus inflatus)
- Potomida littoralis
- Prisodontopsis aviculaeformis
- Protunio messageri
- Pseudodon resupinatus
- Triangular kidneyshell (Ptychobranchus greenii)
- Cumberland monkeyface pearly mussel (Quadrula intermedia)
- Unio abyssinicus
- Thick shelled river mussel (Unio crassus)
- Unio durieui
- Bean mussel (Villosa fabalis)

Subspecies

- Catspaw (Epioblasma obliquata obliquata)
- Rough rabbitsfoot (Quadrula cylindrica strigillata)

==== Other Unionida species ====
- Diplodon dunkerianus
- Diplodon fontaineanus
- Mutela langi
- Pseudomulleria dalyi

=== Venerida ===
- Corbicula possoensis
- Pisidium edlaueri
- Pisidium maasseni

== Cephalopods ==
- Cirroctopus hochbergi
- Opisthoteuthis mero

== See also ==
- Lists of IUCN Red List endangered species
- List of least concern molluscs
- List of near threatened molluscs
- List of vulnerable molluscs
- List of critically endangered molluscs
- List of recently extinct molluscs
- List of data deficient molluscs
