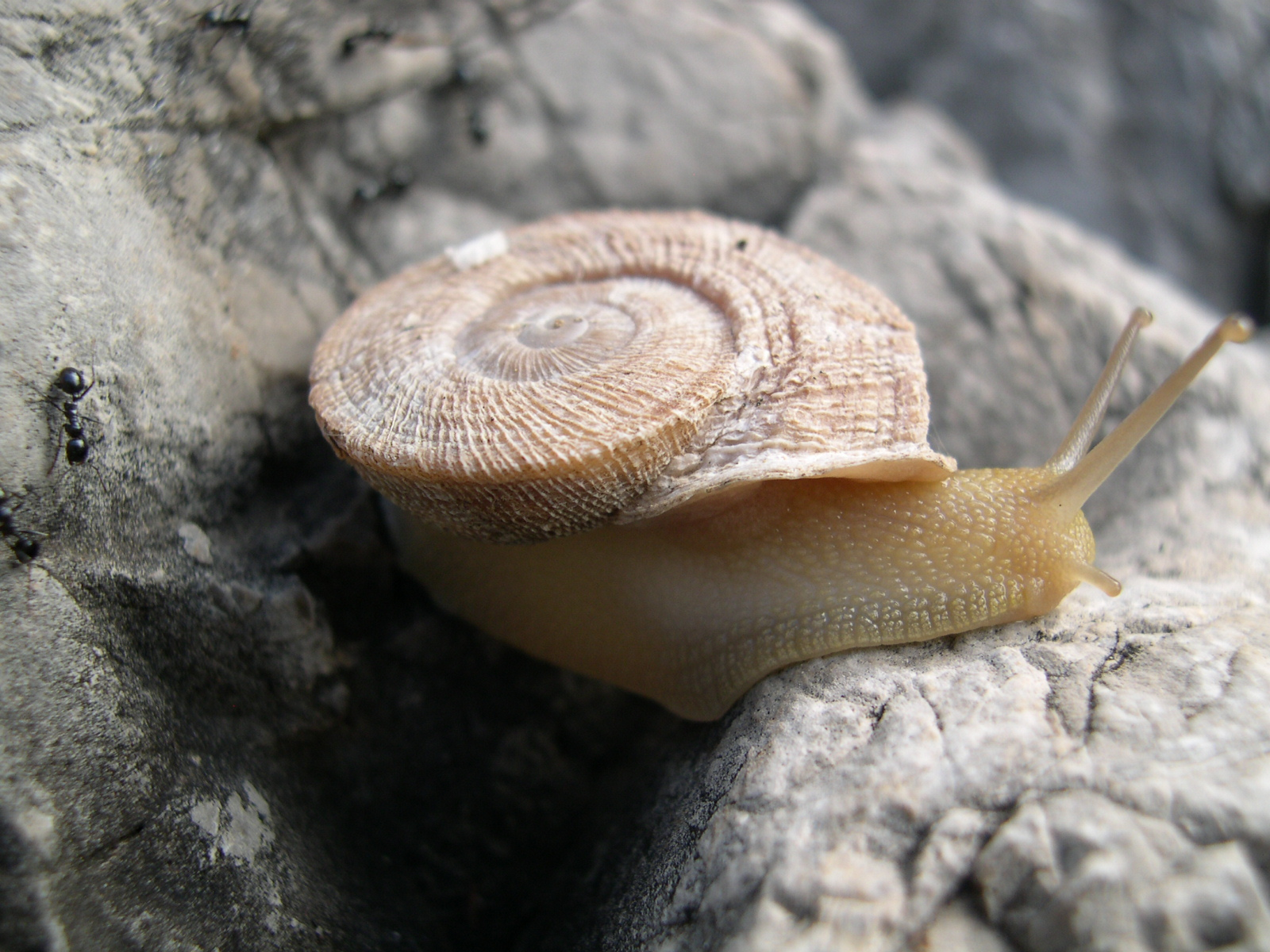
- Iberus gualtieranus

Scientific classification
- Kingdom: Animalia
- Phylum: Mollusca
- Class: Gastropoda
- Order: Stylommatophora
- Family: Helicidae
- Subfamily: Helicinae
- Tribe: Allognathini
- Genus: Iberus; Montfort, 1810

Type species
- Helix gualtierana Linnaeus, 1758

Synonyms
- Euiberus Westerlund, 1889; Helix (Iberus) Montfort, 1810; Ibernus Hall, 1867; Transiberus Monterosato, 1894

= Iberus =

Genus of gastropods

Iberus is a genus of air-breathing land snails, terrestrial pulmonate gastropod mollusks in the subfamily Helicinae of the family Helicidae.

This genus was considered to be endemic to the Iberian Peninsula. However, recently, Pseudotachea was synonymised with Iberus.

== Species and subspecies ==
According to the Fauna Europaea this genus contains the following species and subspecies:

- Iberus alonensis (A. Férussac, 1821)
- Iberus angustatus (Rossmässler, 1854)
- Iberus calaensis Ahuir, 2013
- Iberus campesinus (L. Pfeiffer, 1846)
- Iberus candoni Ahuir, 2021
- Iberus carthaginiensis (Rossmässler, 1853)
- † Iberus delgadoi (Roman, 1907)
- Iberus gualtieranus (Linnaeus, 1758)

Iberus gualtieranus alonensis
Iberus gualtieranus campesinus
Iberus gualtieranus carthaginiensis
Iberus gualtieranus gualterianus
Iberus gualtieranus mariae
Iberus gualtieranus posthumus
Iberus gualtieranus rhodopeplus

- Iberus guiraoanus (L. Pfeiffer, 1853)
- Iberus marmoratus (A. Férussac, 1821)

Iberus marmoratus alcarazanus
Iberus marmoratus cobosi
Iberus marmoratus guiraoanus
Iberus marmoratus loxanus
Iberus marmoratus marmoratus
Iberus marmoratus rositai

- Iberus ortizi García San Nicolás, 1957
- Iberus serpentinae Ahuir, 2020

Species inquirendum

- † Iberus balatonicus Stoliczka, 1862

Species brought into synonymy

- Iberus circejus Kobelt, 1903: synonym of Marmorana serpentina circeja (Kobelt, 1903) (objective synonym and secondary homonym )
- Iberus massyloe (Morelet, 1851): synonym of Massylaea massylaea (Morelet, 1851)
- Iberus melii Kobelt, 1903: synonym of Marmorana serpentina circeja (Kobelt, 1903) (objective junior synonym of Helix (Iberus) melii Kobelt, 1903)
