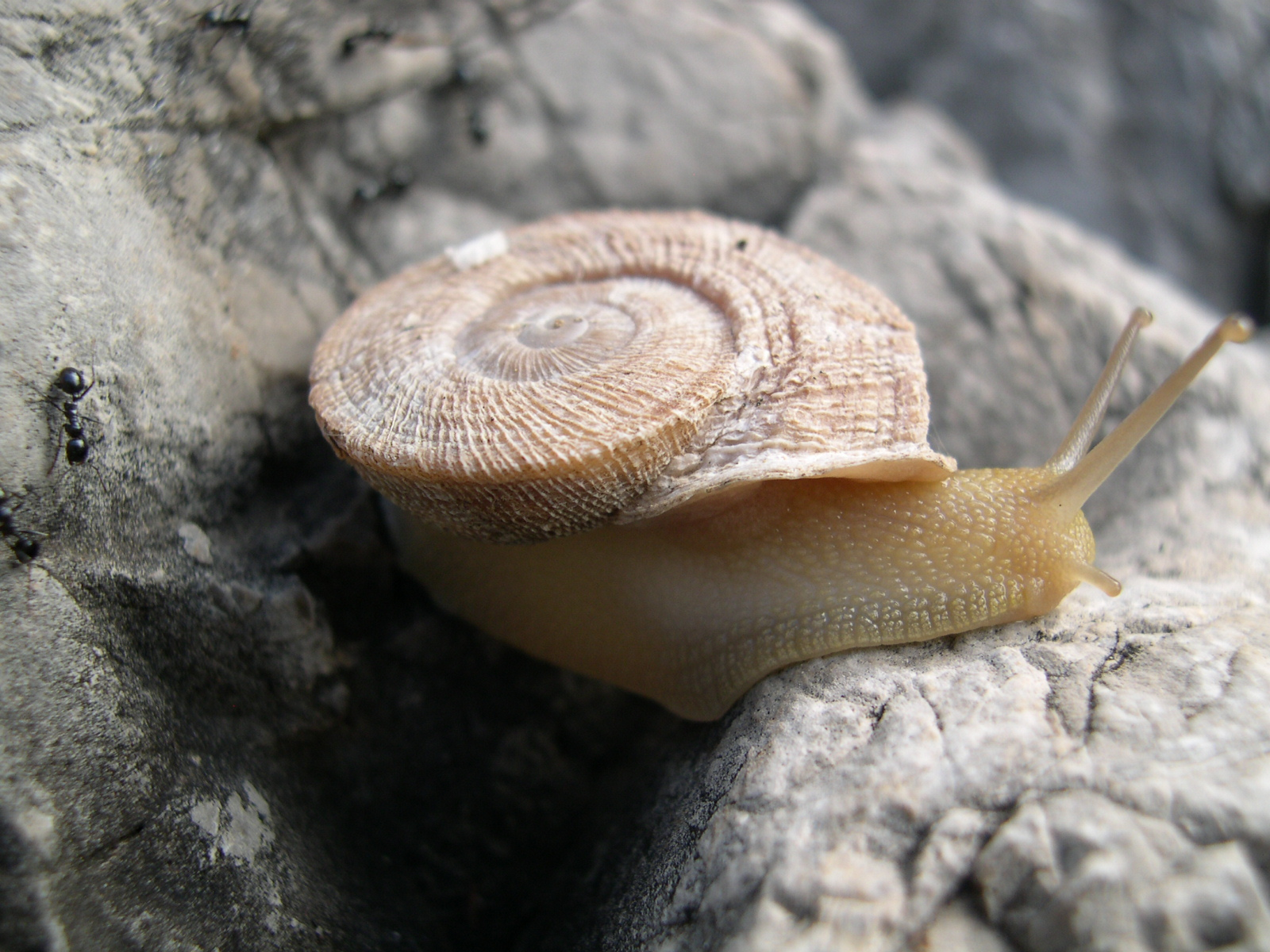
- Iberus gualtieranus

Conservation status
- Endangered (IUCN 3.1)

Scientific classification
- Kingdom: Animalia
- Phylum: Mollusca
- Class: Gastropoda
- Order: Stylommatophora
- Family: Helicidae
- Genus: Iberus
- Species: I. gualtieranus

Binomial name
- Iberus gualtieranus (Linnaeus, 1758)

Synonyms
- Helix gualtierana Linnaeus, 1758; Helix gualtieranus Linnaeus, 1758; Iberus qualtieranus (Linnaeus, 1758) [orthographic error]

= Iberus gualtieranus =

Species of gastropod

Iberus gualtieranus is a species of air-breathing land snail, a terrestrial pulmonate gastropod mollusk in the family Helicidae, the typical snails.

Iberus gualtieranus is the type species of the genus Iberus.

This species is endemic to the southeastern Iberian Peninsula, Spain.

== Subspecies ==
Sometimes up to seven subspecies are recognized:

- Iberus gualtieranus alonensis
- Iberus gualtieranus campesinus
- Iberus gualtieranus carthaginiensis
- Iberus gualtieranus gualterianus
- Iberus gualtieranus mariae
- Iberus gualtieranus posthumus
- Iberus gualtieranus rhodopeplus

However, other studies consider Iberus alonensis, Iberus campesinus, and Iberus carthaginiensis as full species, explicitly recognizing only the following subspecies (Iberus gualtieranus sensu stricto):

- Iberus gualtieranus gualterianus
- Iberus gualtieranus mariae
- Iberus gualtieranus ornatissimus

The latter is the classification followed by IUCN.

== Shell description ==
The shell is keeled and flattened, with marked ornamentation of spiral and radial costulae. In contrast, Iberus alonensis and Iberus campesinus have more rounded shells.

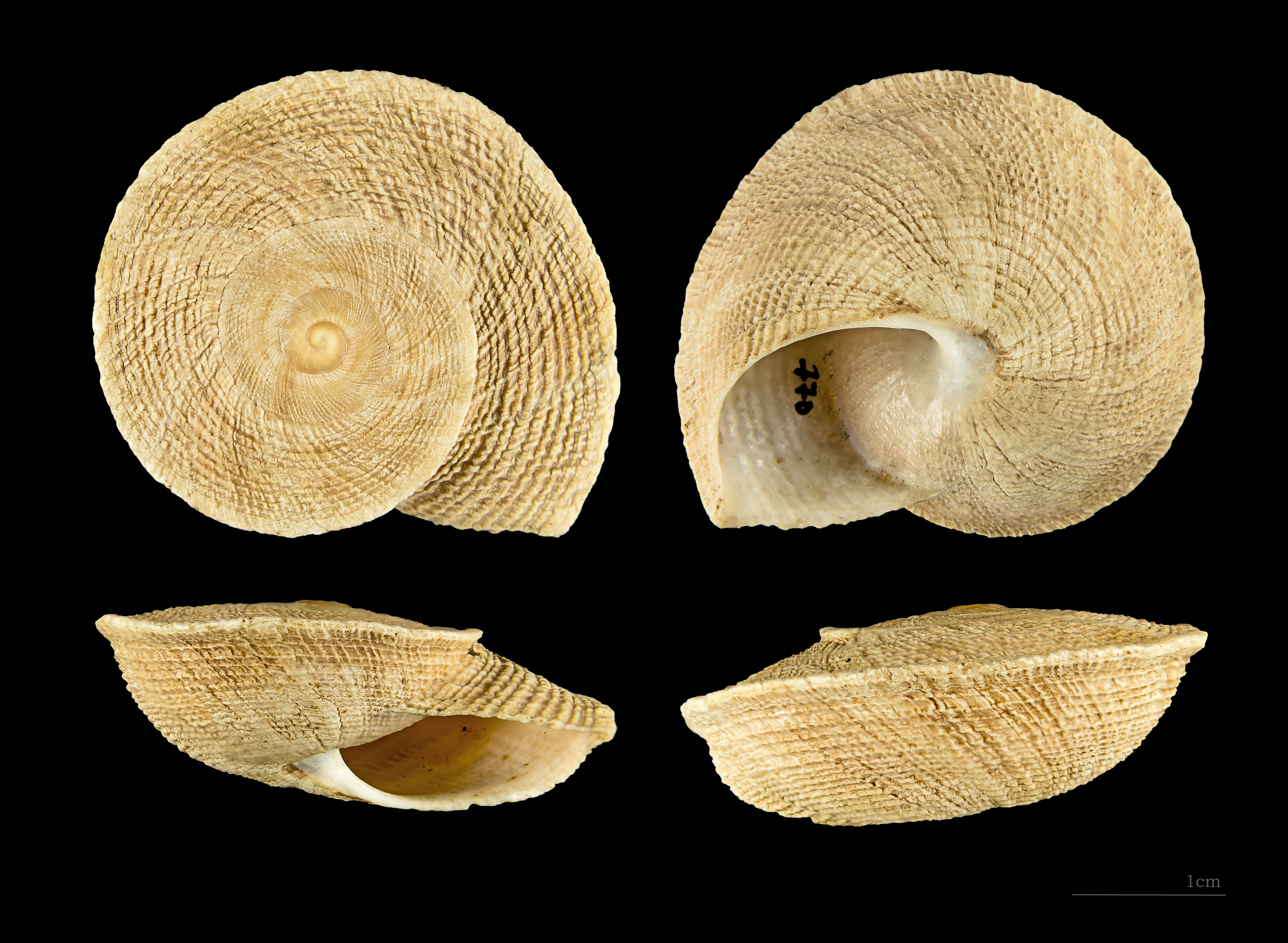
Iberus gualtieranus gualterianus

== Habitat ==
Iberus gualtieranus occurs in limestone mountain areas of rocky substrate and sun exposure sub-desert environments with sparse vegetation. It sometimes also occurs in areas with more vegetation cover. It is primarily active in spring and specially in autumn, when it is not too cold nor too hot and dry.

== Conservation ==
Iberus gualtieranus is threatened by fires and by road construction that fragments its habitat. It is also collected for human consumption and has a high market value, encouraging collection despite its rarity.
