= Leptaxis furva =

Conservation status
- Vulnerable (IUCN 3.1)

Scientific classification
- Kingdom: Animalia
- Phylum: Mollusca
- Class: Gastropoda
- Order: Stylommatophora
- Family: Hygromiidae
- Genus: Leptaxis
- Species: L. furva

Binomial name
- Leptaxis furva (R.T. Lowe, 1831)

Species of gastropod

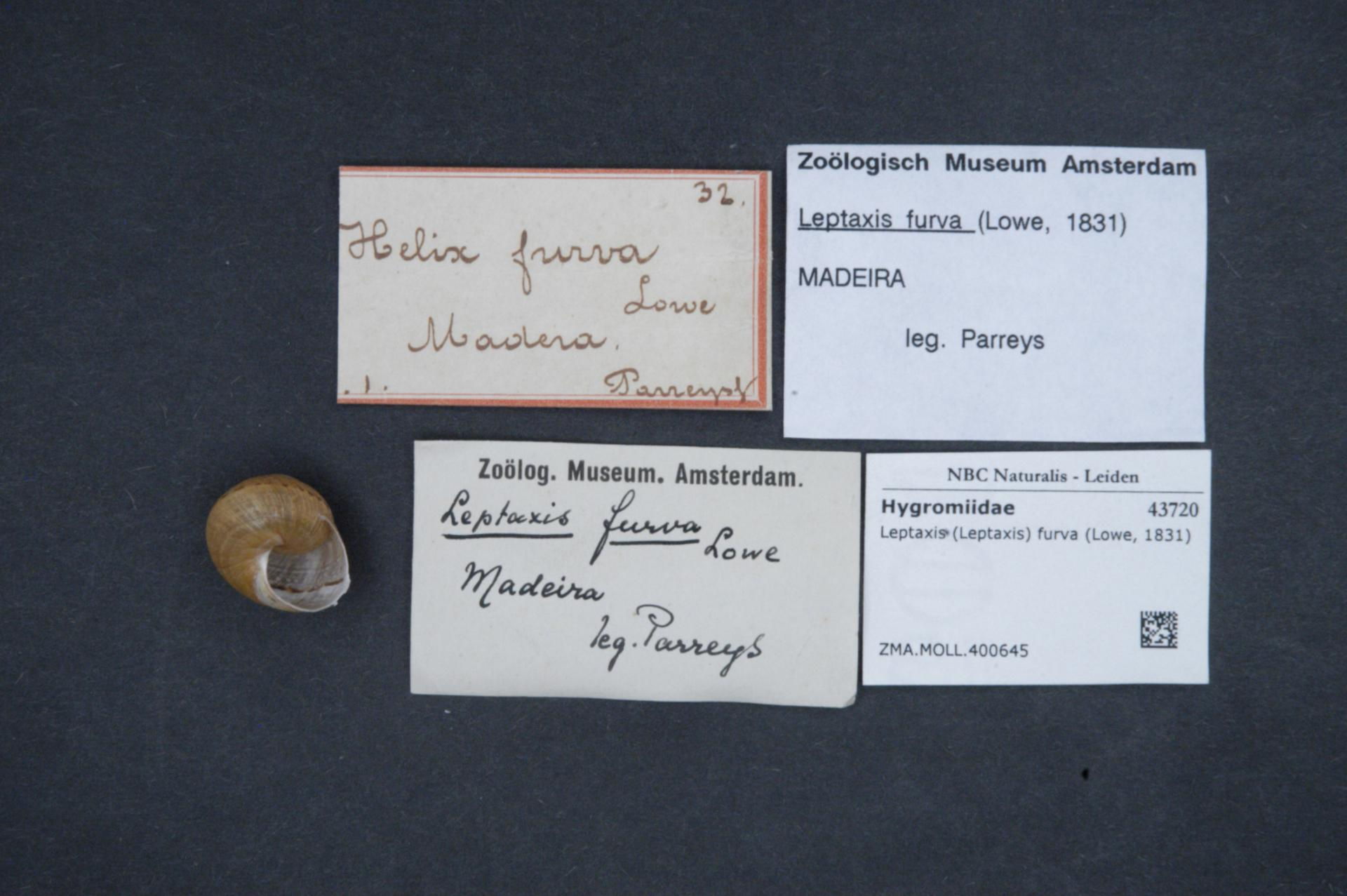
Leptaxis (Leptaxis) furva (Lowe, 1831)

Leptaxis furva is a species of air-breathing land snail, a terrestrial pulmonate gastropod mollusc in the family Helicidae, the typical snails. This species is endemic to Madeira, Portugal.
