= Fametesta =

Scientific classification
- Kingdom: Animalia
- Phylum: Mollusca
- Class: Gastropoda
- Order: Stylommatophora
- Superfamily: Punctoidea
- Family: Charopidae
- Subfamily: Thysanotinae
- Genus: Fametesta; Pilsbry, 1902

Type species
- Hirasea (Fametesta) mirabilis Pilsbry, 1902

Synonyms
- Hirasea (Fametesta) Pilsbry, 1902

Genus of gastropods

Fametesta is a genus of gastropods belonging to the subfamily Thysanotinae of the family Charopidae.

The species of this terrestrial genus are found in Japan.

== Species ==
- † Fametesta katoi (Habe, 1973)
- Fametesta mirabilis (Pilsbry, 1902)
- Fametesta operculina (Gould, 1859)
