= Cyathopoma nishinoi =

Conservation status
- Data Deficient (IUCN 2.3)

Scientific classification
- Kingdom: Animalia
- Phylum: Mollusca
- Class: Gastropoda
- Subclass: Caenogastropoda
- Order: Architaenioglossa
- Family: Cyclophoridae
- Genus: Cyathopoma
- Species: C. nishinoi

Binomial name
- Cyathopoma nishinoi Minato, 1980

Species of gastropod

Cyathopoma nishinoi is a species of land snail with an operculum, a terrestrial gastropod mollusc in the family Cyclophoridae. This species is endemic to Japan.
