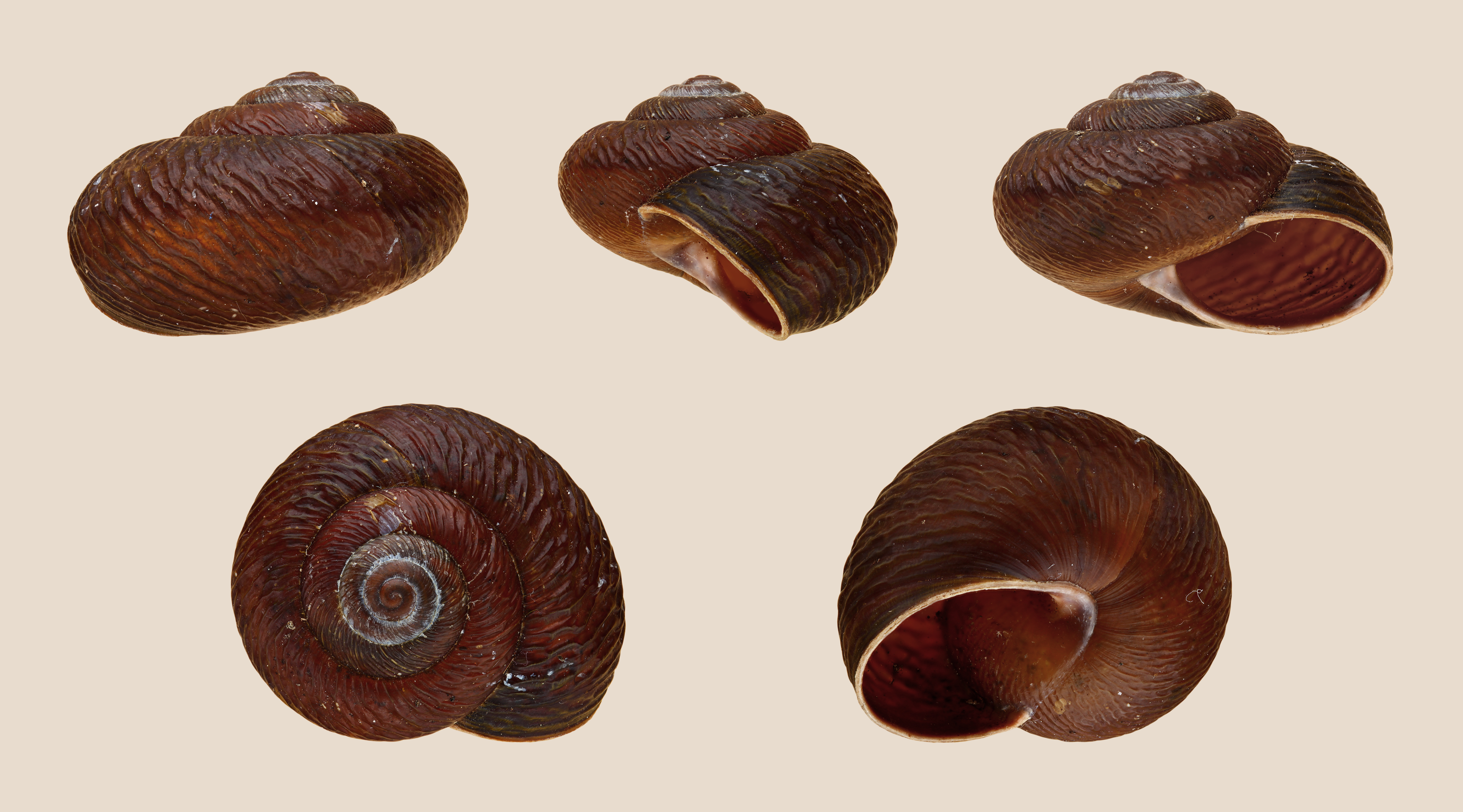
- Leptaxis groviana (Férussac, 1832)

Scientific classification
- Domain: Eukaryota
- Kingdom: Animalia
- Phylum: Mollusca
- Class: Gastropoda
- Order: Stylommatophora
- Infraorder: Helicoidei
- Superfamily: Helicoidea
- Family: Hygromiidae
- Genus: Leptaxis; Lowe, 1852

Synonyms
- Helix (Cryptaxis) R. T. Lowe, 1855; Helix (Katostoma) R. T. Lowe, 1855 (basionym); Helix (Leptaxis) R. T. Lowe, 1852; Leptaxis (Cryptaxis) R. T. Lowe, 1855· accepted, alternate representation; Leptaxis (Helixena) Backhuys, 1975· accepted, alternate representation; Leptaxis (Katostoma) R. T. Lowe, 1855· accepted, alternate representation; Leptaxis (Leptaxis) R. T. Lowe, 1852· accepted, alternate representation

= Leptaxis =

Genus of gastropods

Leptaxis is a genus of air-breathing land snails, terrestrial pulmonate gastropod mollusks in the family Hygromiidae, the typical snails.

Species within this genus of snails create and use love darts as part of their mating behavior.

== Species ==
Species within the genus Leptaxis include:

- Leptaxis azorica Albers, 1852
- Leptaxis bollei (Albers, 1856)
- Leptaxis caldeirarum (Morelet & Drouët, 1857) (uncertain status)
- † Leptaxis chrysomela (L. Pfeiffer, 1846)
- Leptaxis drouetiana (Morelet, 1860)
- Leptaxis erubescens Lowe, 1831
- † Leptaxis fluctuosa (R. T. Lowe, 1852)
- Leptaxis furva (R. T. Lowe, 1831)
- Leptaxis groviana (A. Férussac, 1832)
- † Leptaxis isambertoi Teixeira & Groh, 2019
- Leptaxis membranacea (R. T. Lowe, 1852)
- Leptaxis minor Backhuys, 1975 (uncertain status)
- Leptaxis nivosa (G. B. Sowerby I, 1824)
- † Leptaxis orzolae Gittenberger & Ripken, 1985
- † Leptaxis psammophora (R. T. Lowe, 1852)
- Leptaxis sanctaemariae (Morelet & Drouët, 1857)
- Leptaxis simia (A. Férussac, 1832)
- Leptaxis terceirana (Morelet, 1860) (uncertain status)
- Leptaxis undata (Lowe, 1831)
- Leptaxis vetusa (Morelet & Drouët, 1857)
- Leptaxis wollastoni (R. T. Lowe, 1852)
