= Mathewsoconcha =

Scientific classification
- Kingdom: Animalia
- Phylum: Mollusca
- Class: Gastropoda
- Order: Stylommatophora
- Family: Helicarionidae
- Genus: Mathewsoconcha; Preston, 1913

Genus of gastropods

Mathewsoconcha is a genus of air-breathing land snails or semislugs, terrestrial pulmonate gastropod mollusks in the family Helicarionidae.

== Species ==
Species within the genus Mathewsoconcha include:

- Mathewsoconcha belli
