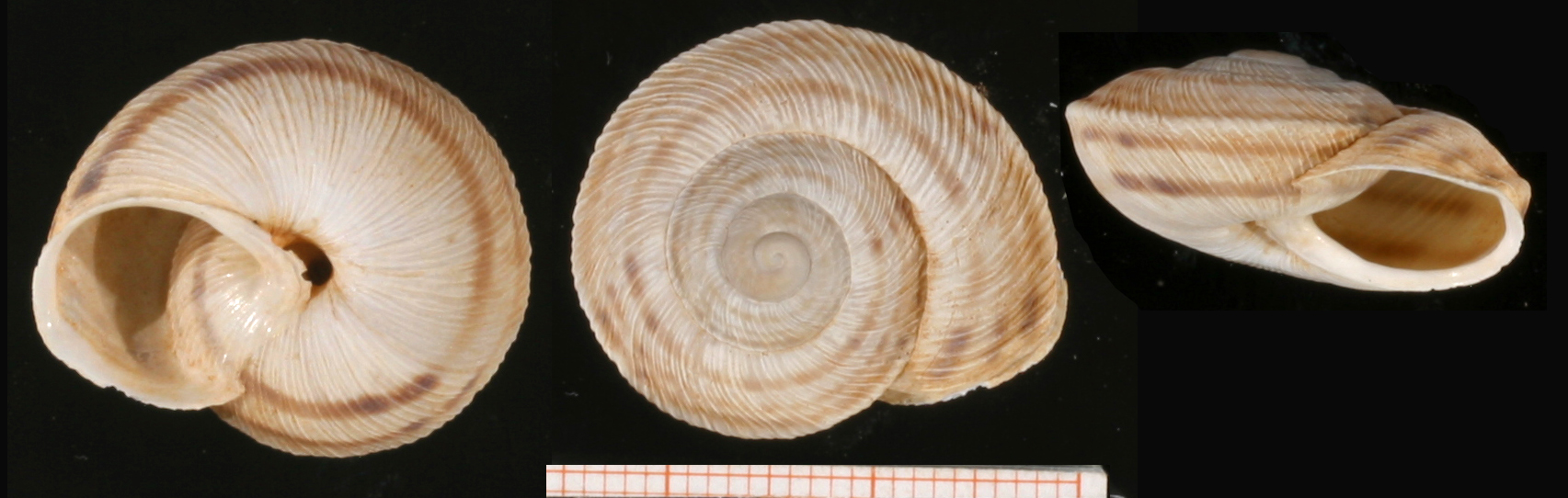
- Shells of Iberus marmoratus rositai

Conservation status
- Least Concern (IUCN 3.1)

Scientific classification
- Kingdom: Animalia
- Phylum: Mollusca
- Class: Gastropoda
- Order: Stylommatophora
- Family: Helicidae
- Genus: Iberus
- Species: I. marmoratus

Binomial name
- Iberus marmoratus (Férussac, 1821)

= Iberus marmoratus =

Species of gastropod

Iberus marmoratus, commonly named cabrilla de sierra, is a species of air-breathing land snail, a terrestrial pulmonate gastropod mollusk in the family Helicidae, the typical snails. It is endemic to southern Spain.

== Subspecies ==
Subspecies of Iberus marmoratus include:

Iberus marmoratus alcarazanus
Iberus marmoratus cobosi Ibáñez & Alonso, 1978
Iberus marmoratus guiraoanus
Iberus marmoratus loxanus (A. Schmidt, 1853)
Iberus marmoratus marmoratus (A. Férussac, 1821)
Iberus marmoratus rositai de Fez, 1950
