= Hovorbis coretus =

Scientific classification
- Domain: Eukaryota
- Kingdom: Animalia
- Phylum: Mollusca
- Class: Gastropoda
- Superorder: Hygrophila
- Family: Planorbidae
- Genus: Hovorbis
- Species: H. coretus

Binomial name
- Hovorbis coretus (de Blainville, 1826)

Synonyms
- Africanogyrus coretus (de Blainville, 1826); Planorbis coretus de Blainville, 1826

Species of gastropod

Hovorbis coretus is a species of gastropods belonging to the family Planorbidae.

The species is found across Africa.
