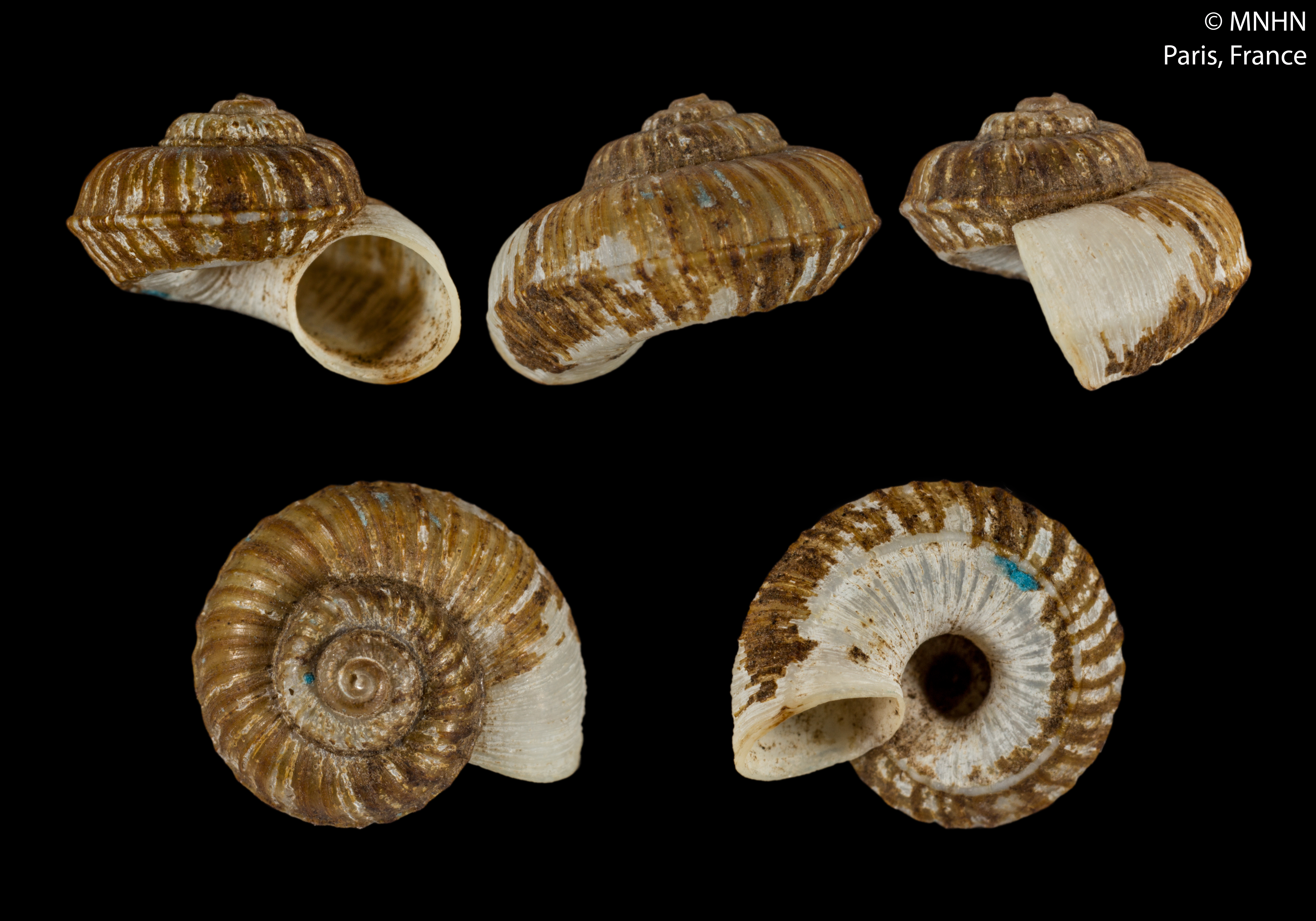
- Shell of Cyathopoma huberi (holotype at MNHN, Paris)

Scientific classification
- Kingdom: Animalia
- Phylum: Mollusca
- Class: Gastropoda
- Subclass: Caenogastropoda
- Order: Architaenioglossa
- Superfamily: Cyclophoroidea
- Family: Cyclophoridae
- Genus: Cyathopoma; Blanford, 1861

Type species
- Cyclostoma filocinctum Benson, 1851

Synonyms
- Cyathopoma (Cyathopoma) W. T. Blanford & H. F. Blanford, 1861· accepted, alternate representation; Cyathopoma (Jerdonia) W.T. Blanford & H.F. Blanford, 1861 (junior synonym); Cyathopoma (Pseudojerdonia) Kobelt, 1902· accepted, alternate representation; Jerdonia W. T. Blanford & H. F. Blanford, 1861; Pseudojerdonia Kobelt, 1902 (unaccepted rank)

= Cyathopoma =

Genus of gastropods

Cyathopoma is a genus of land snails with an operculum, a terrestrial gastropod mollusks in the family Cyclophoridae.

== Species ==
Species within the genus Cyathopoma include:

- Cyathopoma africanum Pilsbry, 1919
- Cyathopoma album Beddome, 1875
- Cyathopoma ambanianae Emberton, 2003
- Cyathopoma ambatovakiae Emberton, 2003
- Cyathopoma ambrense Emberton, 2003
- Cyathopoma anamallayanum Beddome, 1875
- Cyathopoma andapae Emberton, 2003
- Cyathopoma anjombona K. C. Emberton, Slapcinsky, Campbell, Rakotondrazafy, Andriamiarison & J. D. Emberton, 2010
- Cyathopoma antsirarakaense ( Fischer-Piette, Blanc, C.P., Blanc, F. & Salvat, 1993)
- Cyathopoma artatum Sykes, 1897
- Cyathopoma atrosetosum Beddome, 1875
- Cyathopoma avoa Emberton, 2003
- Cyathopoma azaniense Verdcourt, 1978
- Cyathopoma beampingaratrae Emberton, 2003
- Cyathopoma beddomeanum Nevill, 1881
- Cyathopoma bemahalevonae Emberton, 2003
- Cyathopoma bemarahae Emberton, 2003
- Cyathopoma betamponae Emberton, 2003
- Cyathopoma bevavatsotra Emberton, 2003
- Cyathopoma biangulatum Emberton, 2003
- Cyathopoma bikatsara Emberton, 2003
- Cyathopoma blanfordi H. Adams, 1868
- Cyathopoma camerunense de Winter, 2002
- Cyathopoma celestinae Emberton, 2003
- Cyathopoma ceylanicum Beddome, 1875
- Cyathopoma chirindae (van Bruggen, 1986)
- Cyathopoma colleti Sykes, 1898
- Cyathopoma conoideum Sykes, 1898
- Cyathopoma coonoorense W. T. Blanford, 1868
- Cyathopoma cornu Möllendorff, 1891
- Cyathopoma damoclesi Emberton, 1994
- Cyathopoma deccanense W. T. Blanford, 1868
- Cyathopoma delicatum Emberton, 2003
- Cyathopoma dickoyense (Beddome, 1875)
- Cyathopoma diegoense Fischer-Piette, Blanc, F. & Vukadinovic, 1974
- Cyathopoma duboisi Fischer-Piette, Blanc, C.P., Blanc, F. & Salvat, 1993
- Cyathopoma elatum Beddome, 1875
- Cyathopoma faravoriae Emberton, 2003
- Cyathopoma filocinctum (Benson, 1851)
- Cyathopoma franzhuberi Thach, 2020
- Cyathopoma garoense Godwin-Austen, 1876
- Cyathopoma griffithsi Emberton, 2003
- Cyathopoma hoditra K. C. Emberton, Slapcinsky, Campbell, Rakotondrazafy, Andriamiarison & J. D. Emberton, 2010
- Cyathopoma huberi Thach, 2018
- Cyathopoma imperforatum Nevill, 1881
- Cyathopoma inexspectatum G. Holyoak & D. Holyoak, 2020
- Cyathopoma innocens Sykes, 1899
- Cyathopoma iridescens K. C. Emberton, Slapcinsky, Campbell, Rakotondrazafy, Andriamiarison & J. D. Emberton, 2010
- Cyathopoma iva Emberton, 2003
- Cyathopoma jawaiense Godwin-Austen, 1876
- Cyathopoma josephinae Emberton, 2003
- Cyathopoma kalryenense (W. T. & H. F. Blanford, 1861)
- Cyathopoma kelirusteri Emberton, 2003
- Cyathopoma kianjavatoae Emberton, 2003
- Cyathopoma kolamulliense (W. T. & H. F. Blanford, 1861)
- Cyathopoma lasavava Emberton, 2003
- Cyathopoma latilabre Beddome, 1875
- Cyathopoma lava Emberton, 2003
- Cyathopoma lavabea Emberton, 2003
- Cyathopoma leptomitum Sykes, 1898
- Cyathopoma madio K. C. Emberton, Slapcinsky, Campbell, Rakotondrazafy, Andriamiarison & J. D. Emberton, 2010
- Cyathopoma magnificum Emberton, 2003
- Cyathopoma mahafinaritra Emberton, 2003
- Cyathopoma mahagaga Emberton, 2003
- Cyathopoma mahalevonae Emberton, 2003
- Cyathopoma maherivava Emberton, 2003
- Cyathopoma majungae ( Fischer-Piette, Blanc, C.P., Blanc, F. & Salvat, 1993)
- Cyathopoma malabaricum (W. T. Blanford & H. F. Blanford, 1860)
- Cyathopoma mariae Jousseaume, 1894
- Cyathopoma marojejiae Emberton, 2003
- Cyathopoma masoalae Emberton, 2003
- Cyathopoma matsoko K. C. Emberton, Slapcinsky, Campbell, Rakotondrazafy, Andriamiarison & J. D. Emberton, 2010
- Cyathopoma meredithae (van Bruggen, 1983)
- Cyathopoma miakatra Emberton, 2003
- Cyathopoma miaranoniae Emberton, 2003
- Cyathopoma michellae Emberton, 2003
- Cyathopoma micronicum Yen, 1948
- Cyathopoma mirehareda Emberton, 2003
- Cyathopoma molotra Emberton, 2003
- Cyathopoma natalicium Godwin-Austen, 1895
- Cyathopoma nevilli Godwin-Austen, 1876
- Cyathopoma nishinoi Minato, 1980
- Cyathopoma nitidum Beddome, 1875
- Cyathopoma nosymangabe Emberton, 2003
- Cyathopoma ogdenianum Preston, 1909
- Cyathopoma onjavava Emberton, 2003
- Cyathopoma orchida Emberton, 2003
- Cyathopoma ovatum Beddome, 1875
- Cyathopoma pauliani Salvat, 1968
- Cyathopoma pearcei Emberton, 2003
- Cyathopoma peilei Preston, 1903
- Cyathopoma pembense Rowson, 2010
- Cyathopoma perconoideum Preston, 1909
- Cyathopoma picardense Gerlach, 2006
- Cyathopoma picbobyi Emberton, 2003
- Cyathopoma planorboides Yen, 1948
- Cyathopoma platorchida Emberton, 2003
- Cyathopoma prestoni Sykes, 1897
- Cyathopoma procerum W. T. Blanford, 1868
- Cyathopoma pygmaeum Emberton, 2003
- Cyathopoma randalana Emberton & Pearce, 1999
- Cyathopoma ranomafanae Emberton, 1994
- Cyathopoma rusteri Fischer-Piette, Blanc, C.P., Blanc, F. & Salvat, 1993
- Cyathopoma ruthae Emberton, 2003
- Cyathopoma sahalalava Emberton, 2003
- Cyathopoma saintemariae Emberton, 2003
- Cyathopoma serendibense Preston, 1903
- Cyathopoma shevaroyanum Beddome, 1875
- Cyathopoma sivagherrianum Beddome, 1875
- Cyathopoma straeleni Fischer-Piette, Blanc, C.P., Blanc, F. & Salvat, 1993
- Cyathopoma taiwanicum Pilsbry & Hirase, 1905
- Cyathopoma tataka Emberton, 2003
- Cyathopoma tignarium Benson, 1863
- Cyathopoma travancoricum Beddome, 1875
- Cyathopoma tres van Bruggen, 2008
- Cyathopoma trochlea van Bruggen, 2008
- Cyathopoma tsaratananae Emberton, 2003
- Cyathopoma turbinatum Sykes, 1897
- Cyathopoma uncopercula (Emberton, 1994)
- Cyathopoma uvaense Preston, 1909
- Cyathopoma vasoloae Emberton, 2003
- Cyathopoma vavatsotra Emberton, 2003
- Cyathopoma vitreum Beddome, 1875
- Cyathopoma waterloti Fischer-Piette, Blanc, F. & Vukadinovic, 1974
- Cyathopoma wynaadense W. T. Blanford, 1868
