= Fonscochlea accepta =

Conservation status
- Vulnerable (IUCN 2.3)

Scientific classification
- Kingdom: Animalia
- Phylum: Mollusca
- Class: Gastropoda
- Subclass: Caenogastropoda
- Order: Littorinimorpha
- Family: Tateidae
- Genus: Fonscochlea
- Species: F. accepta

Binomial name
- Fonscochlea accepta Ponder, Hershler & Jenkins 1989

Species of gastropod

Fonscochlea accepta is a species of small freshwater snails with an operculum, aquatic gastropod molluscs or micromolluscs in the family Hydrobiidae. This species is endemic to Australia.
