= Radioconus =

Scientific classification
- Domain: Eukaryota
- Kingdom: Animalia
- Phylum: Mollusca
- Class: Gastropoda
- Order: Stylommatophora
- Family: Charopidae
- Genus: Radioconus; Baker, 1927

Genus of gastropods

Radioconus is a genus of small air-breathing land snails, terrestrial pulmonate gastropod mollusks in the family Charopidae.

== Species ==
Species within the genus Radioconus include:

- Radioconus goeldi
- Radioconus riochcoensis
