= Hovorbis =

Scientific classification
- Domain: Eukaryota
- Kingdom: Animalia
- Phylum: Mollusca
- Class: Gastropoda
- Superorder: Hygrophila
- Family: Planorbidae
- Tribe: Planorbini
- Genus: Hovorbis; D.S. Brown & Mandahl-Barth, 1973

Diversity
- 4 species

Synonyms
- Africanogyrus Özdikmen & Darilmaz, 2007; Afrogyrus D. S. Brown & Mandahl-Barth, 1973; Afrogyrus (Afrogyrus) D. S. Brown & Mandahl-Barth, 1973; Afrogyrus (Hovorbis) D. S. Brown & Mandahl-Barth, 1973

Genus of gastropods

Hovorbis is a genus of air-breathing freshwater snails in the family Planorbidae, the ram's horn snails and their allies.

== Species ==
- Hovorbis coretus (de Blainville, 1826)
- Hovorbis crassilabrum (Morelet, 1860)
- Hovorbis rodriguezensis (Crosse, 1873)
- Hovorbis starmuehlneri (Brown, 1980)
