= Radioconus goeldi =

Conservation status
- Critically Endangered (IUCN 2.3)

Scientific classification
- Kingdom: Animalia
- Phylum: Mollusca
- Class: Gastropoda
- Order: Stylommatophora
- Family: Charopidae
- Genus: Radioconus
- Species: R. goeldi

Binomial name
- Radioconus goeldi Thiele, 1927

Species of gastropod

Radioconus goeldi is a species of small air-breathing land snails, terrestrial pulmonate gastropod mollusks in the family Charopidae. This species is endemic to Brazil.
