= Fametesta mirabilis =

Conservation status
- Data Deficient (IUCN 2.3)

Scientific classification
- Kingdom: Animalia
- Phylum: Mollusca
- Class: Gastropoda
- Order: Stylommatophora
- Family: Charopidae
- Genus: Fametesta
- Species: F. mirabilis

Binomial name
- Fametesta mirabilis (Pilsbry, 1902)

Synonyms
- Hirasea mirabilis Pilsbry, 1902

Species of gastropod

Fametesta mirabilis is a species of air-breathing land snail, a small terrestrial pulmonate gastropod mollusc in the family Charopidae.

This is an endangered species.

== Distribution ==
This species (and indeed the whole genus) is endemic to Japan.
