= Leptaxis vetusta =

Conservation status
- Extinct (IUCN 3.1)

Scientific classification
- Kingdom: Animalia
- Phylum: Mollusca
- Class: Gastropoda
- Order: Stylommatophora
- Family: Hygromiidae
- Genus: Leptaxis
- Species: †L. vetusta

Binomial name
- †Leptaxis vetusta (Morelet & Drouët, 1857)

Species of gastropod

Leptaxis vetusta was a species of air-breathing land snail, a terrestrial pulmonate gastropod mollusc in the family Helicidae, the typical snails.

This species was endemic to the Azores, Portugal, but is now thought to be extinct. Besides its shell, its anatomy is unknown. The type locality of the species is the south and southeast slopes of Pico do Facho, Santa Maria Island.
