= Fonscochlea =

Scientific classification
- Kingdom: Animalia
- Phylum: Mollusca
- Class: Gastropoda
- Subclass: Caenogastropoda
- Order: Littorinimorpha
- Family: Tateidae
- Genus: Fonscochlea; Ponder, Hershler & Jenkins, 1989

Type species
- Fonscochlea accepta Ponder, Hershler & Jenkins, 1989 Ponder, Hershler & Jenkins, 1989

Genus of gastropods

Fonscochlea is a genus of minute freshwater snails with an operculum, aquatic gastropod molluscs or micromolluscs in the family Tateidae. The genus is endemic to mound springs in the Lake Eyre supergroup of South Australia.

== Species ==
Species within the genus Fonscochlea include:

subgenus Fonscochlea

- Fonscochlea accepta Ponder, Hershler & Jenkins, 1989 - type species
- Fonscochlea aquatica Ponder, Hershler & Jenkins, 1989
- Fonscochlea billakalina Ponder, Hershler & Jenkins 1989
- Fonscochlea conica Ponder, Hershler & Jenkins 1989
- Fonscochlea variabilis Ponder, Hershler & Jenkins, 1989

subgenus Wolfgangia Ponder, Hershler & Jenkins 1989

- Fonscochlea zeidleri Ponder, Hershler & Jenkins 1989 - type species of the subgenus Wolfgangia
