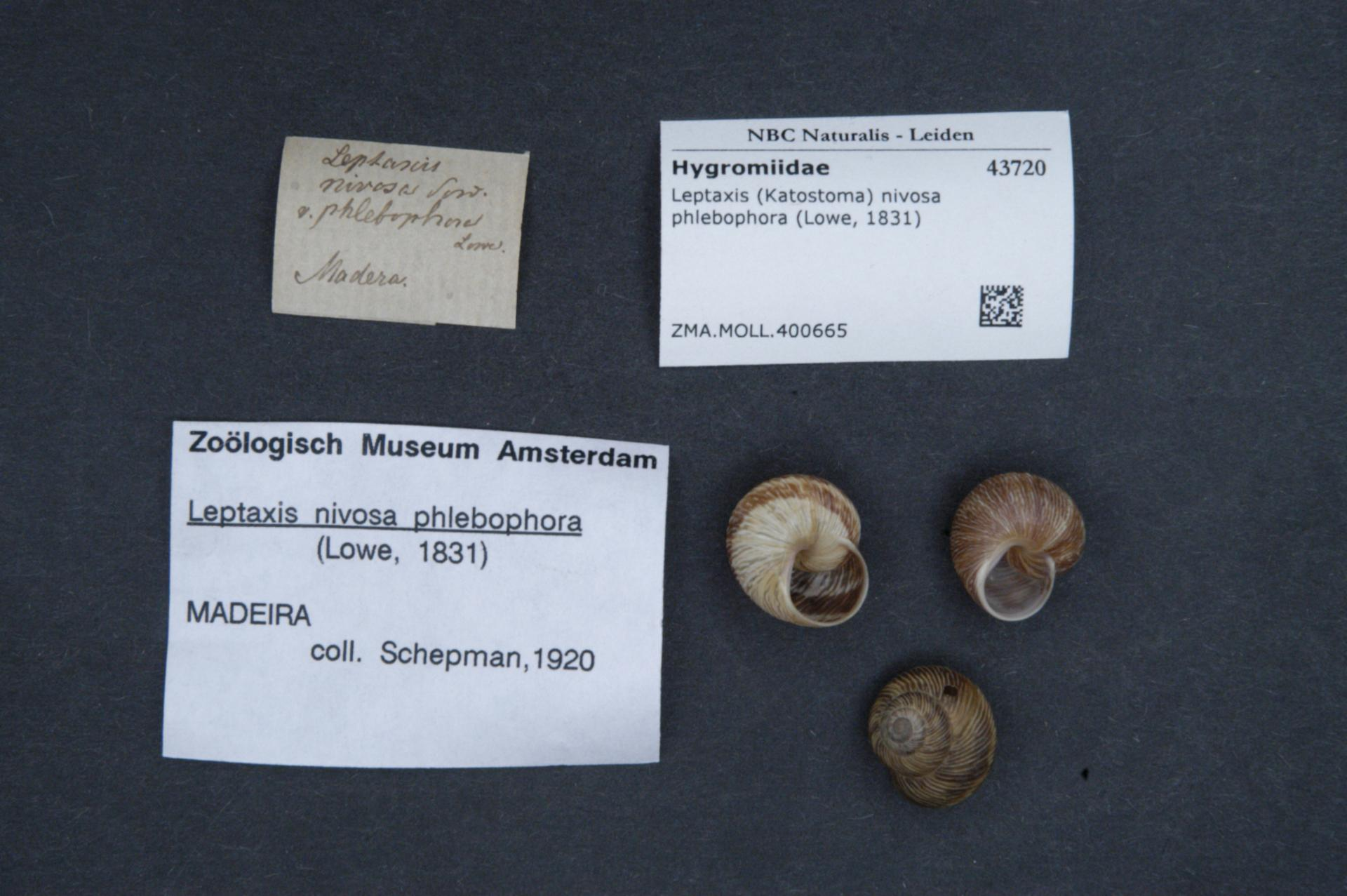
- Leptaxis (Katostoma) nivosa shells

Scientific classification
- Domain: Eukaryota
- Kingdom: Animalia
- Phylum: Mollusca
- Class: Gastropoda
- Order: Stylommatophora
- Family: Hygromiidae
- Genus: Leptaxis
- Species: L. nivosa

Binomial name
- Leptaxis nivosa Lowe, 1831

= Leptaxis nivosa =

Species of gastropod

Leptaxis nivosa is a species of air-breathing land snail, a terrestrial pulmonate gastropod mollusc in the family Helicidae, the typical snails. It is endemic to Madeira.

== Anatomy ==
These snails create and use love darts as part of their mating behavior.
