= Leptaxis undata =

Scientific classification
- Domain: Eukaryota
- Kingdom: Animalia
- Phylum: Mollusca
- Class: Gastropoda
- Order: Stylommatophora
- Family: Hygromiidae
- Genus: Leptaxis
- Species: L. undata

Binomial name
- Leptaxis undata (Lowe,1831)

Species of gastropod

Leptaxis undata is a species of air-breathing land snail, a terrestrial pulmonate gastropod mollusc in the family Helicidae, the typical snails.

== Anatomy ==
These snails create and use love darts as part of their mating behavior.
