= Leptaxis terceirana =

Conservation status
- Least Concern (IUCN 3.1)

Scientific classification
- Kingdom: Animalia
- Phylum: Mollusca
- Class: Gastropoda
- Order: Stylommatophora
- Family: Hygromiidae
- Genus: Leptaxis
- Species: L. terceirana

Binomial name
- Leptaxis terceirana Morelet, 1860

Species of gastropod

Leptaxis terceirana is a species of land snail in the family Helicidae, the typical snails. It is endemic to the Azores.

This species is known only from Graciosa and Terceira Islands in the Azores. It lives in a variety of habitat types, including disturbed areas, such as roadside walls. It is not considered to be threatened and no specific conservation measures are in place.
