= Cyathopoma randalana =

Conservation status
- Vulnerable (IUCN 2.3)

Scientific classification
- Kingdom: Animalia
- Phylum: Mollusca
- Class: Gastropoda
- Subclass: Caenogastropoda
- Order: Architaenioglossa
- Family: Cyclophoridae
- Genus: Cyathopoma
- Species: C. randalana

Binomial name
- Cyathopoma randalana Emberton & Pearce, 1999

Species of gastropod

Cyathopoma randalana is a species of land snail with an operculum, a terrestrial gastropod mollusk in the family Cyclophoridae.

This species is endemic to Madagascar. Its natural habitat is subtropical or tropical dry forests.
