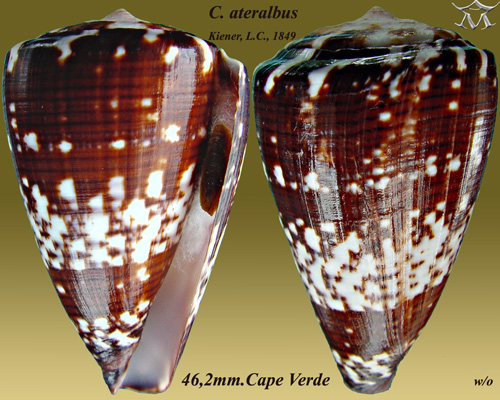
- Apertural and abapertural views of shell of Conus ateralbus Kiener, L.C., 1849
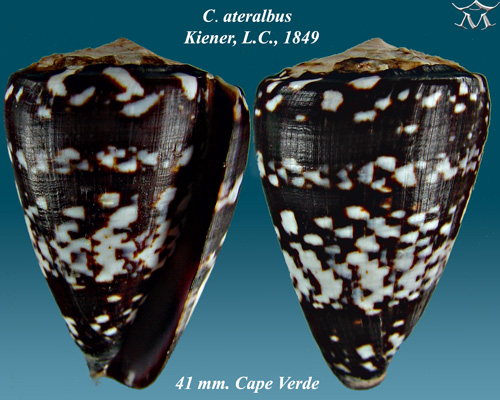

Conservation status
- Endangered (IUCN 3.1)

Scientific classification
- Kingdom: Animalia
- Phylum: Mollusca
- Class: Gastropoda
- Subclass: Caenogastropoda
- Order: Neogastropoda
- Superfamily: Conoidea
- Family: Conidae
- Genus: Conus
- Species: C. ateralbus

Binomial name
- Conus ateralbus (Kiener, 1845)

Synonyms
- Conus (Kalloconus) ateralbus Kiener, 1850 · accepted, alternate representation; Trovaoconus ateralbus Kiener, L.C., 1845

= Conus ateralbus =

Species of sea snail

Conus ateralbus is a species of sea snail, a marine gastropod mollusk in the family Conidae, the cone snails and their allies.

These snails are predatory and venomous. They are capable of stinging humans, therefore live ones should be handled carefully or not at all.

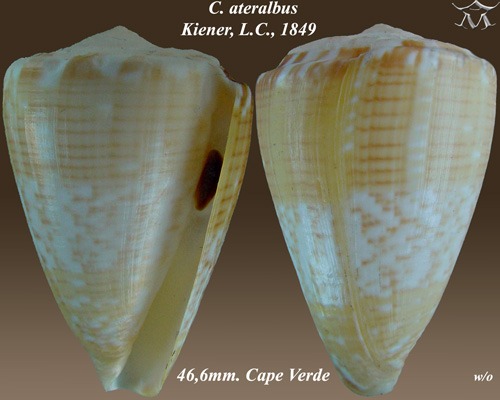
Conus ateralbus Kiener, L.C., 1849

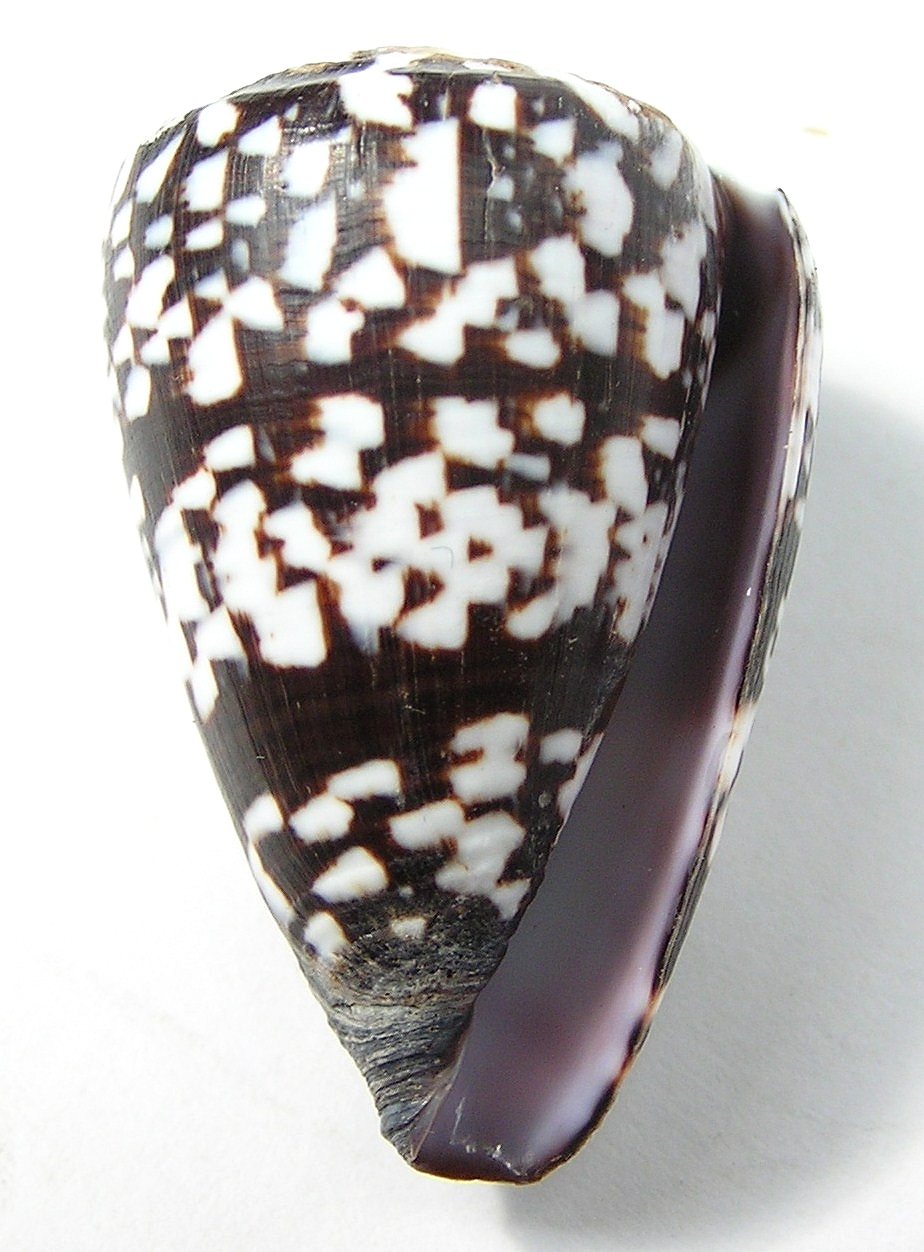
Apertural view of Conus ateralbus

== Description ==
The size of an adult shell varies between 29 mm and 48 mm.

== Distribution ==
This marine species occurs in the Atlantic Ocean, where it is restricted to the coast of the island of Sal, Cape Verde.
