= Hovorbis rodriguezensis =

Conservation status
- Vulnerable (IUCN 3.1)

Scientific classification
- Kingdom: Animalia
- Phylum: Mollusca
- Class: Gastropoda
- Superorder: Hygrophila
- Family: Planorbidae
- Genus: Hovorbis
- Species: H. rodriguezensis

Binomial name
- Hovorbis rodriguezensis (Crosse, 1873)

Synonyms
- Africanogyrus rodriguezensis (Crosse, 1873); Afrogyrus rodriguezensis (Crosse, 1873); Planorbis rodriguezensis Crosse, 1873 (original combination)

Species of gastropod

Hovorbis rodriguezensis is a species of air-breathing freshwater snail, an aquatic pulmonate gastropod mollusc in the family Planorbidae, the ram's horn snails and their allies.

== Distribution ==
This species is endemic to Mauritius.

This species' generic name was first changed to Africanogyrus in 2007.
