= Mathewsoconcha belli =

Conservation status
- Endangered (IUCN 2.3)

Scientific classification
- Kingdom: Animalia
- Phylum: Mollusca
- Class: Gastropoda
- Order: Stylommatophora
- Family: Helicarionidae
- Genus: Mathewsoconcha
- Species: M. belli

Binomial name
- Mathewsoconcha belli Preston, 1913

Species of gastropod

Mathewsoconcha belli is a species of air-breathing land snails or semislugs, terrestrial pulmonate gastropod mollusks in the family Helicarionidae. This species is endemic to Norfolk Island.
