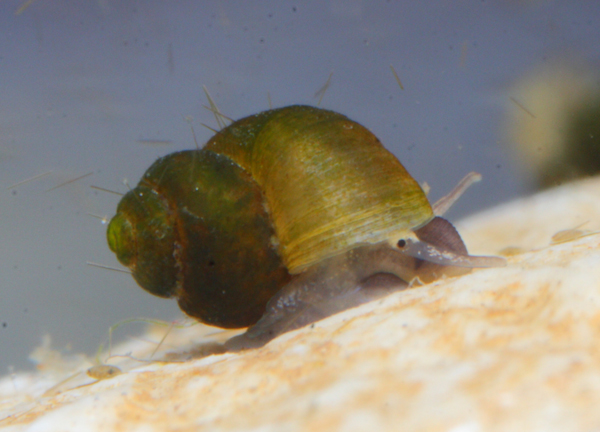
- Alzoniella edmundi, Sóller, Mallorca

Conservation status
- Endangered (IUCN 3.1)

Scientific classification
- Kingdom: Animalia
- Phylum: Mollusca
- Class: Gastropoda
- Subclass: Caenogastropoda
- Order: Littorinimorpha
- Family: Hydrobiidae
- Genus: Alzoniella
- Species: A. edmundi

Binomial name
- Alzoniella edmundi (Boeters, 1984)

Synonyms
- Alzoniella (Alzoniella) edmundi (Boeters, 1984) · alternate representation; Belgrandiella edmundi Boeters, 1984

= Alzoniella edmundi =

Species of gastropod

Alzoniella edmundi is a species of spring snail, an aquatic gastropod in the family Hydrobiidae.

This species is endemic to Mallorca.
