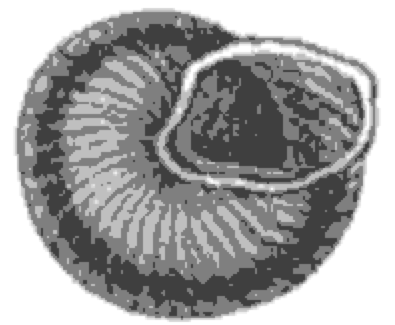
- Illustration of the shell of Leptaxis wollastoni

Conservation status
- Endangered (IUCN 3.1)

Scientific classification
- Kingdom: Animalia
- Phylum: Mollusca
- Class: Gastropoda
- Order: Stylommatophora
- Family: Hygromiidae
- Genus: Leptaxis
- Species: L. wollastoni

Binomial name
- Leptaxis wollastoni Lowe, 1852

= Leptaxis wollastoni =

Species of gastropod

Leptaxis wollastoni is an endangered species of air-breathing land snail, a terrestrial pulmonate gastropod mollusc in the family Helicidae, the typical snails. This species is endemic to Madeira (Porto Santo and Ilhéu de Fora).
