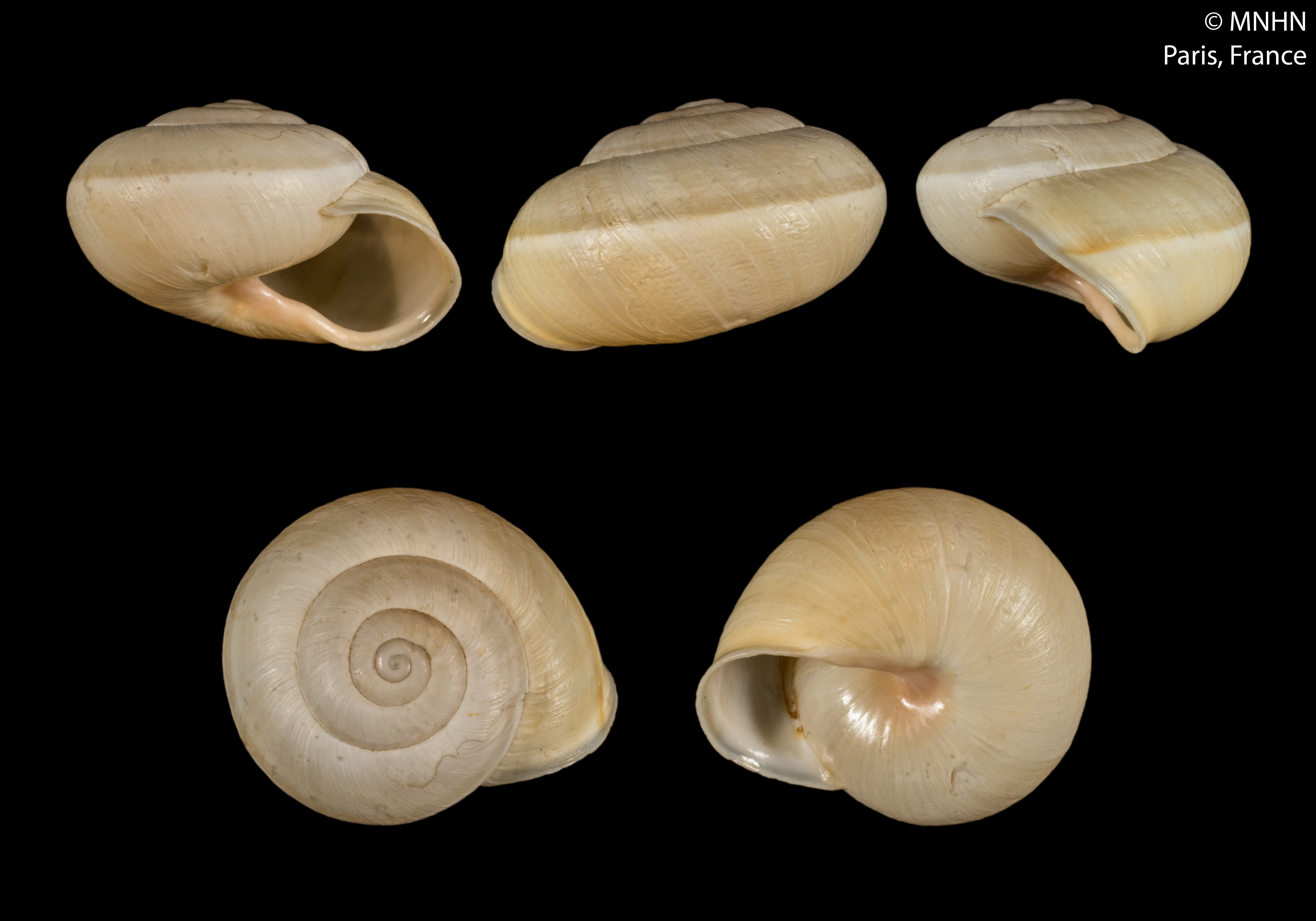
- Shell of Pseudotachea liturata (syntype at MNHN, Paris)

Scientific classification
- Domain: Eukaryota
- Kingdom: Animalia
- Phylum: Mollusca
- Class: Gastropoda
- Order: Stylommatophora
- Family: Helicidae
- Subfamily: Helicinae
- Tribe: Allognathini
- Genus: Pseudotachea; C. R. Boettger, 1909

Type species
- Helix splendida Draparnaud, 1801

Synonyms
- Helix (Pseudotachea) C. R. Boettger, 1909

= Pseudotachea =

Genus of gastropods

Pseudotachea is a genus of medium-sized air-breathing land snails, terrestrial pulmonate gastropod mollusks in the subfamily Helicinae of the family Helicidae.

Like many Helicidae, this genus of snails create and use love darts.

== Species ==
- Pseudotachea liturata (L. Pfeiffer, 1851)
- Pseudotachea splendida (Draparnaud, 1801)

Species inquirendum

- † Pseudotachea torresi (Roman, 1907)

Species brought into synonymy

- Pseudotachea cotteri (Roman, 1907) †: synonym of Megalotachea cotteri (Roman, 1907) †
- Pseudotachea ogerieni (Delafond & Depéret, 1893) †: synonym of Frechenia ogerieni (Delafond & Depéret, 1893) †
- Pseudotachea tersannensis (Locard, 1878) †: synonym of Megalotachea delphinensis (Fontannes, 1876) † (junior synonym)
