= Palaopartula thetis =

Palau Pandanus tree snail

Conservation status
- Endangered (IUCN 3.1)

Scientific classification
- Kingdom: Animalia
- Phylum: Mollusca
- Class: Gastropoda
- Order: Stylommatophora
- Family: Partulidae
- Genus: Palaopartula
- Species: P. thetis

Binomial name
- Palaopartula thetis Semper, 1865

Synonyms
- Partula thetis

Species of gastropod

Palaopartula thetis is a species of air-breathing tropical land snail, a terrestrial pulmonate gastropod mollusc in the family Partulidae. This species is endemic to Palau.
