= Radioconus riochcoensis =

Conservation status
- Endangered (IUCN 2.3)

Scientific classification
- Kingdom: Animalia
- Phylum: Mollusca
- Class: Gastropoda
- Order: Stylommatophora
- Family: Charopidae
- Genus: Radioconus
- Species: R. riochcoensis

Binomial name
- Radioconus riochcoensis Crawford, 1939

Species of gastropod

Radioconus riochcoensis is a species of small air-breathing land snails, terrestrial pulmonate gastropod mollusks in the family Charopidae. This species is endemic to Brazil.
