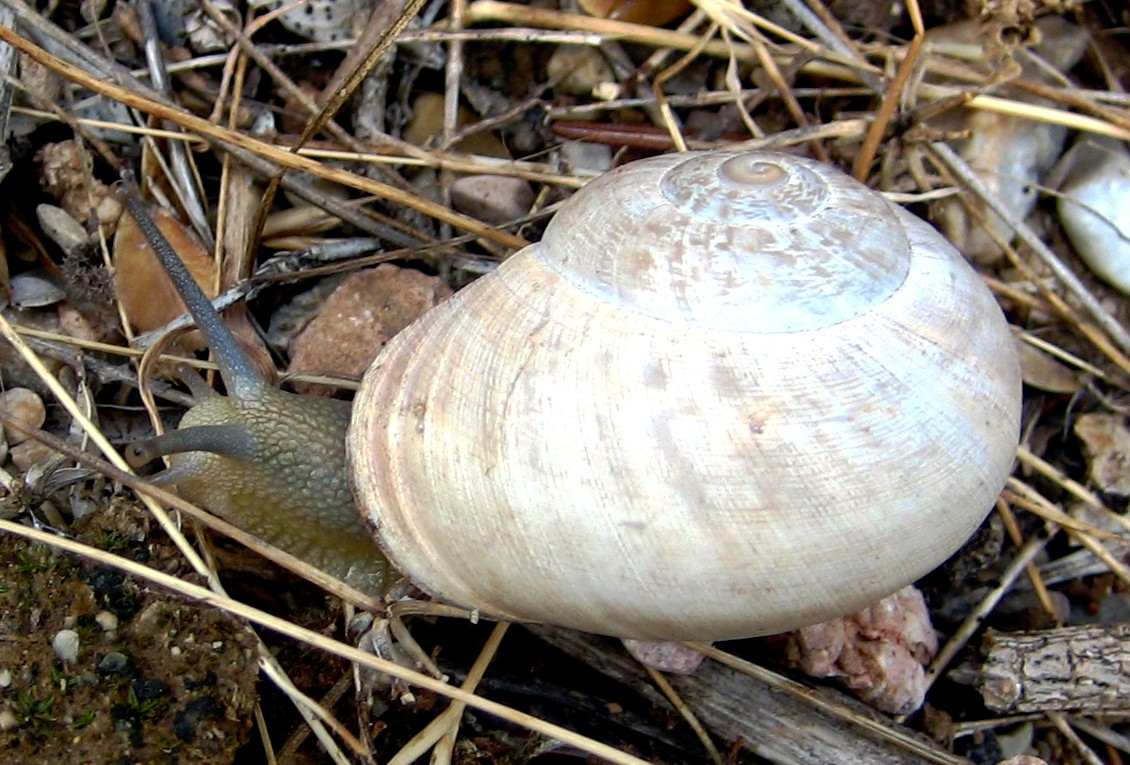

Conservation status
- Near Threatened (IUCN 3.1)

Scientific classification
- Kingdom: Animalia
- Phylum: Mollusca
- Class: Gastropoda
- Order: Stylommatophora
- Family: Helicidae
- Genus: Iberus
- Species: I. alonensis

Binomial name
- Iberus alonensis (Férussac, 1821)

= Iberus alonensis =

Species of gastropod

Iberus alonensis is a species of gastropods belonging to the family Helicidae.

The species is found in Spain.
