= Advena charon =

Conservation status
- Endangered (IUCN 2.3)

Scientific classification
- Kingdom: Animalia
- Phylum: Mollusca
- Class: Gastropoda
- Order: Stylommatophora
- Family: Helicarionidae
- Genus: Advena
- Species: A. charon

Binomial name
- Advena charon Preston, 1913

Species of gastropod

Advena charon is a species of air-breathing land snail or semi-slug, a terrestrial pulmonate gastropod mollusc in the family Helicarionidae. This species is endemic to Norfolk Island, an Australian territory.
