= Cyathopoma picardense =

Conservation status
- Endangered (IUCN 3.1)

Scientific classification
- Kingdom: Animalia
- Phylum: Mollusca
- Class: Gastropoda
- Subclass: Caenogastropoda
- Order: Architaenioglossa
- Family: Cyclophoridae
- Genus: Cyathopoma
- Species: C. picardense

Binomial name
- Cyathopoma picardense Gerlach, 2006

Species of gastropod

Cyathopoma picardense is a species of land snail in the family Cyclophoridae. It is an endangered species endemic to the Aldabra atoll of Seychelles.

== Taxonomy and history ==
Cyathopoma picardense was named and identified as a distinct taxon by several authors in the 20th century, however, this name could not be considered valid under the International Code of Zoological Nomenclature until a formal scientific description was published by Justin Gerlach in 2006. The specific epithet picardense refers to the type locality, Picard Island.

== Distribution and habitat ==
Cyathopoma picardense is found only on the islands of Picard, Malabar, and Grande Terre in the Aldabra atoll of the Seychelles. It inhabits coastal scrubland and woodlands from sea level to 6 m (20 ft) above sea level.

== Conservation status ==
Cyathopoma picardense is listed as endangered on the International Union for the Conservation of Nature Red List under critera B2ab(iii), based on its limited distribution and high risk of habitat loss. Though the entire population occurs within a protected area, the Aldabra Special Reserve, the population is believed to be declining. This species is particularly threatened by sea level rise resulting from climate change, with the majority of the population found at less than 2 m (6 ft 7 in) above sea level.
