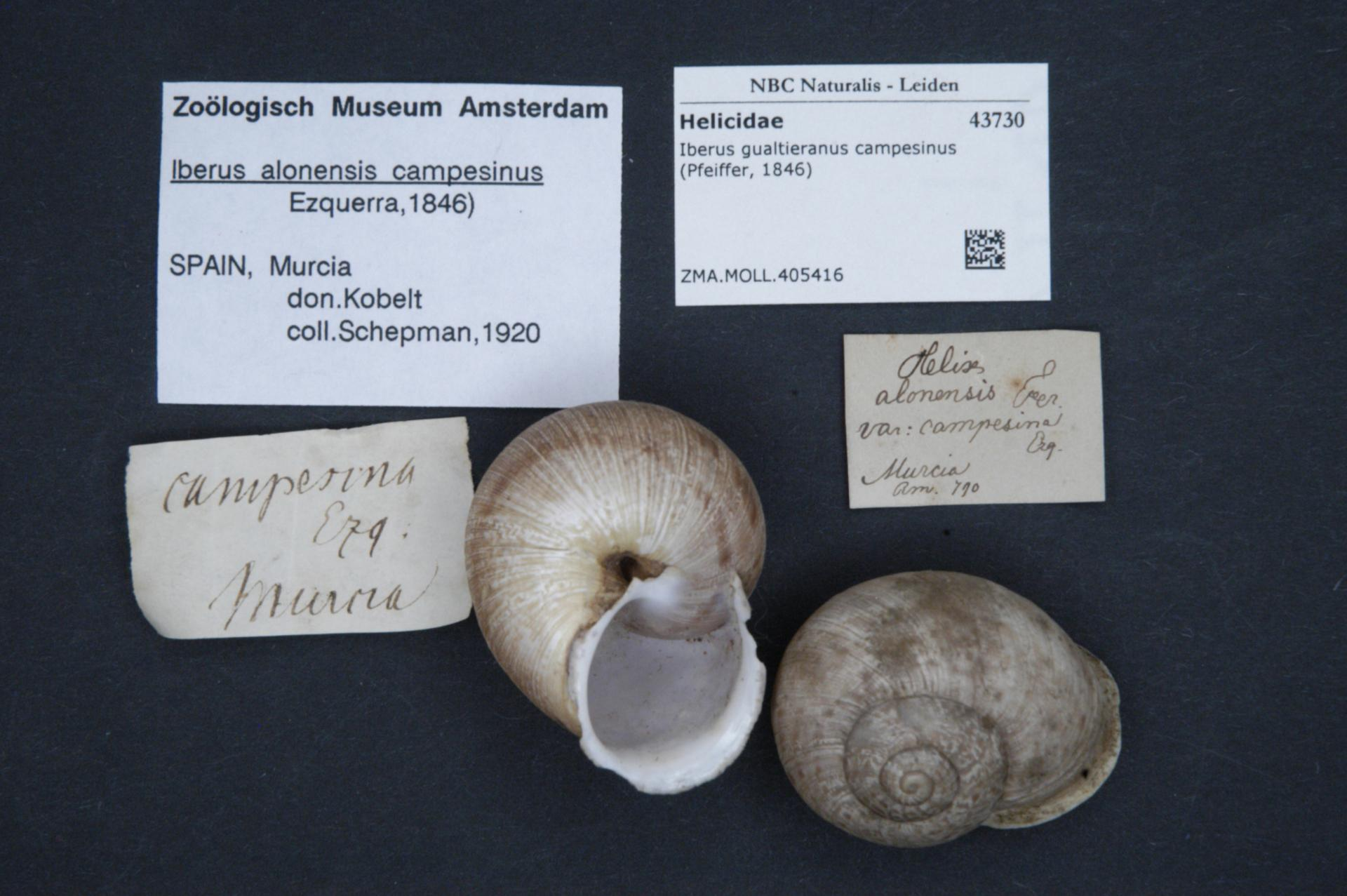
- Iberus gualtieranus campesinus

Scientific classification
- Kingdom: Animalia
- Phylum: Mollusca
- Class: Gastropoda
- Order: Stylommatophora
- Family: Helicidae
- Genus: Iberus
- Species: I. campesinus

Binomial name
- Iberus campesinus (Pfeiffer, 1846)

= Iberus campesinus =

Species of gastropod

Iberus campesinus is a species of gastropods belonging to the family Helicidae.

The species is found in Spain.

Per IUCN, the species has the status "vulnerable".
