= Fonscochlea aquatica =

Conservation status
- Endangered (IUCN 3.1)

Scientific classification
- Kingdom: Animalia
- Phylum: Mollusca
- Class: Gastropoda
- Subclass: Caenogastropoda
- Order: Littorinimorpha
- Family: Tateidae
- Genus: Fonscochlea
- Species: F. aquatica

Binomial name
- Fonscochlea aquatica Ponder, Hershler & Jenkins 1989

Species of gastropod

Fonscochlea aquatica is a species of small freshwater snails with an operculum, aquatic gastropod molluscs or micromolluscs in the family Hydrobiidae. This species is endemic to Australia.
