= Hacrochlamys lineolatus =

Conservation status
- Endangered (IUCN 2.3)

Scientific classification
- Kingdom: Animalia
- Phylum: Mollusca
- Class: Gastropoda
- Order: Stylommatophora
- Family: Euconulidae
- Genus: Hacrochlamys
- Species: H. lineolatus

Binomial name
- Hacrochlamys lineolatus Pilsbry & Hirase

Species of gastropod

Hacrochlamys lineolatus is a species of small air-breathing land snails, terrestrial pulmonate gastropod mollusks in the family Euconulidae, the hive snails.

This species is endemic to Japan. Its survival is endangered.
