= Hovorbis starmuehlneri =

Conservation status
- Endangered (IUCN 3.1)

Scientific classification
- Kingdom: Animalia
- Phylum: Mollusca
- Class: Gastropoda
- Superorder: Hygrophila
- Family: Planorbidae
- Genus: Hovorbis
- Species: H. starmuehlneri

Binomial name
- Hovorbis starmuehlneri (Brown, 1980)

Synonyms
- Afrogyrus starmuehlneri (Brown, 1980)

Species of gastropod

Hovorbis starmuehlneri is a species of air-breathing freshwater snail, an aquatic pulmonate gastropod mollusc in the family Planorbidae the ram's horn snails and their allies.

== Distribution ==
This species is endemic to Madagascar.

The original generic name was first changed to Africanogyrus in 2007.
