= Peleliua oleacina =

Conservation status
- Endangered (IUCN 3.1)

Scientific classification
- Kingdom: Animalia
- Phylum: Mollusca
- Class: Gastropoda
- Order: Stylommatophora
- Superfamily: Trochomorphoidea
- Family: Trochomorphidae
- Genus: Peleliua
- Species: P. oleacina

Binomial name
- Peleliua oleacina (C. Semper, 1873)

Synonyms
- Peleliua (Periryua) oleacina (C. Semper, 1873) · alternate representation; Trochomorpha oleacina C. Semper, 1873 · (original combination)

Species of gastropod

Peleliua oleacina is a species of terrestrial pulmonate gastropod mollusk in the family Trochomorphidae.

This species is endemic to Palau.
