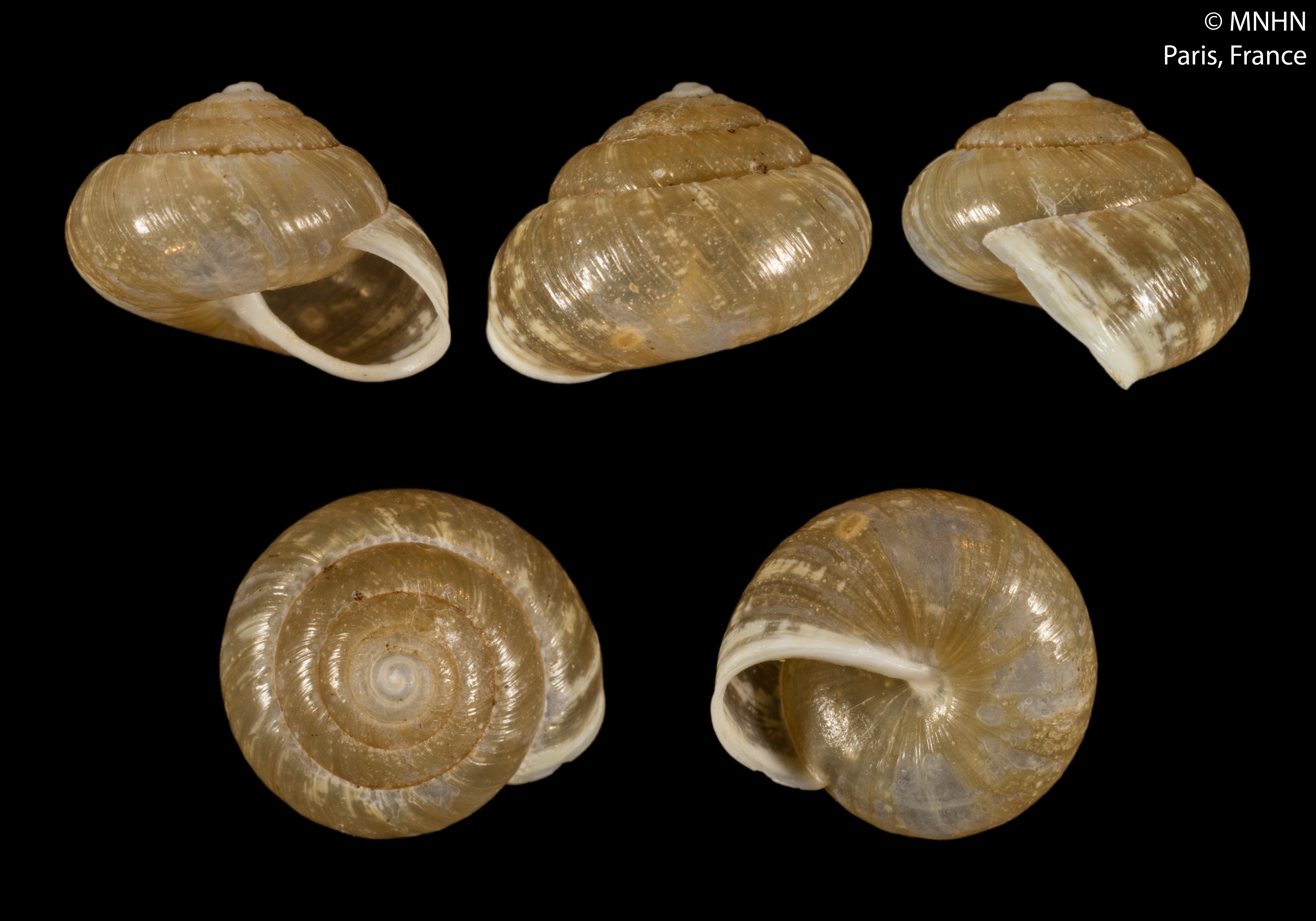

Conservation status
- Endangered (IUCN 3.1)

Scientific classification
- Kingdom: Animalia
- Phylum: Mollusca
- Class: Gastropoda
- Order: Stylommatophora
- Family: Hygromiidae
- Genus: Leptaxis
- Species: L. caldeirarum

Binomial name
- Leptaxis caldeirarum Morelet & Drouet, 1857

= Leptaxis caldeirarum =

Species of gastropod

Leptaxis caldeirarum is an endangered species of air-breathing land snail, a terrestrial pulmonate gastropod mollusc in the family Helicidae, the typical snails.

The status of this species is uncertain, although it is in the Red List.

This species is endemic to Portugal.

== Description ==
The length of the shell attains 10.4 mm.

== Distribution ==
The population of this species is restricted to the Sete Cidades volcanic complex, in the western tip if the São Miguel island in the Azores. This species is extremely rare and lives around the Sete Cidades crater.

== Habitat ==
Leptaxis caldeirarum lives in secondarily forested areas and native vegetation.
