= Fametesta operculina =

Conservation status
- Endangered (IUCN 2.3)

Scientific classification
- Kingdom: Animalia
- Phylum: Mollusca
- Class: Gastropoda
- Order: Stylommatophora
- Family: Charopidae
- Genus: Fametesta
- Species: F. operculina

Binomial name
- Fametesta operculina (Gould, 1859)

Synonyms
- Hirasea operculina Gould, 1859

Species of gastropod

Fametesta operculina is a species of air-breathing land snail, a small terrestrial pulmonate gastropod mollusc in the family Endodontidae.

This is an endangered species.

== Distribution ==
This species (and the whole genus) is endemic to Japan.
