= List of non-marine molluscs of Morocco =

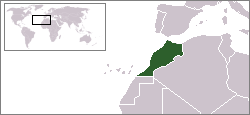
Location of Morocco

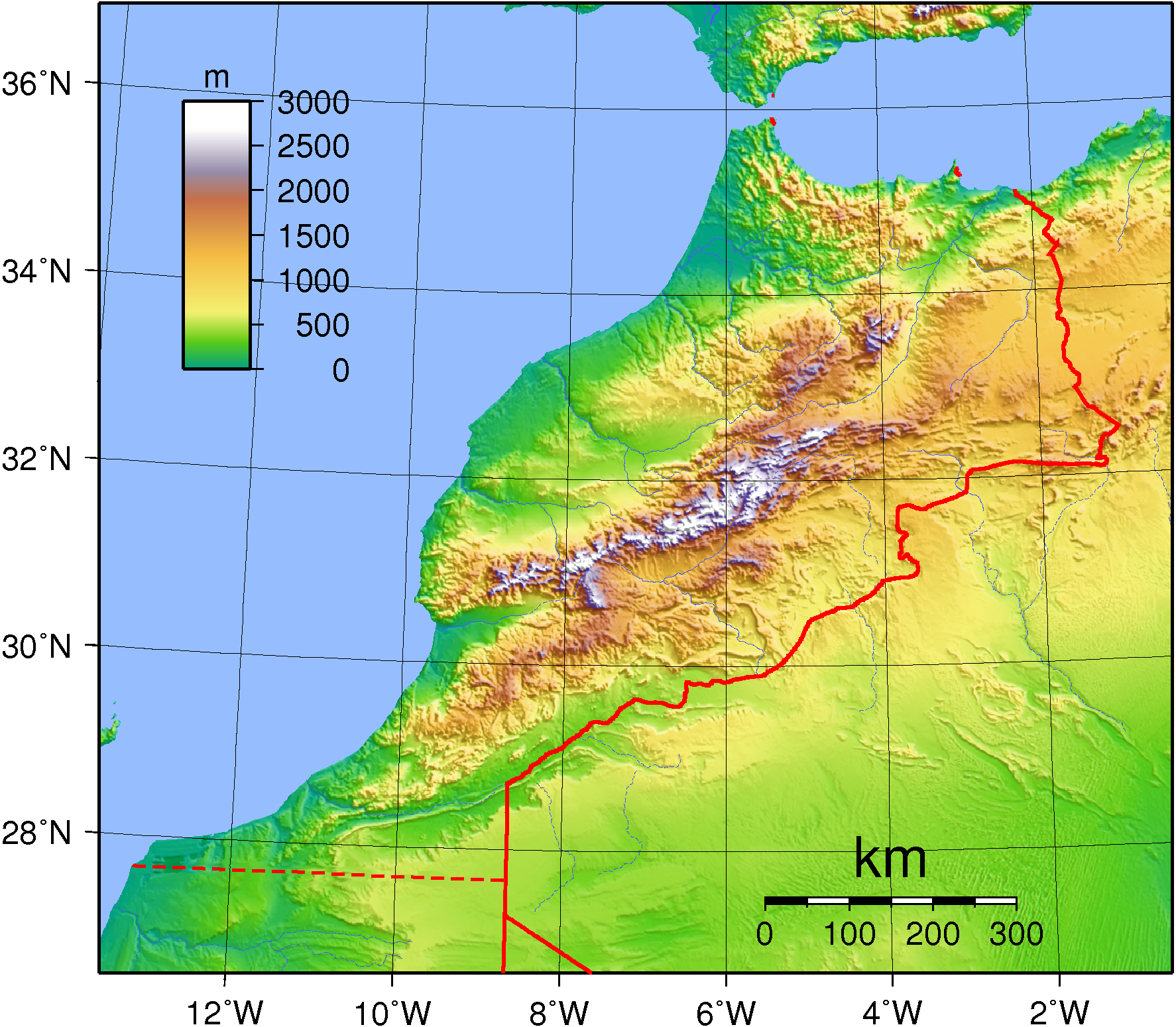
Topography of Morocco.

The non-marine molluscs of Morocco are a part of the molluscan fauna of Morocco (Wildlife of Morocco).

A number of species of non-marine molluscs are found in the wild in Morocco.

== Freshwater gastropods ==
Thiaridae

- Melanoides tuberculata (Müller, 1774)

Hydrobiidae

- Aghbalia aghbalensis Glöer, Mabrouki & Taybi, 2020
- Ainiella zahredini Taybi, Glöer & Mabrouki, 2022
- Atebbania bernasconi Ghamizi, Bodon, Boulal & Giusti, 1999
- Belgrandia wiwanensis Ghamizi (1998)
- Ecrobia vitrea (Risso, 1826)
- Fessia aouintii Glöer, Mabrouki & Taybi, 2020
- Giustia bodoni Ghamizi, 1998
- Giustia costata Ghamizi, 1998
- Giustia gofasi Ghamizi, 1998
- Giustia janai Ghamizi, 1998
- Giustia mellalensis Ghamizi, 1998
- Giustia midarensis Ghamizi, 1998
- Giustia saidai Ghamizi, 1998
- Heideella andreae Backhyus & Boeters, 1974
- Heideella knidirii Ghamizi, 1998
- Heideella makhfamensis Bodon, Ghamizi & Giusti, 1999
- Heideella salahi Ghamizi (1998)
- Horatia aghbalensis Ghamizi (1998)
- Horatia haasei Ghamizi (1998)
- Hydrobia gracilis Morelet, 1880
- Hydrobia recta (Mousson, 1874)
- Idrisiella bourkaizensis Mabrouki, Glöer & Taybi, 2022
- Ifrania zerroukansis Glöer, Mabrouki & Taybi, 2020
- Islamia karawiyiensis Glöer, Mabrouki & Taybi, 2021 - endemic to Morocco
- Islamia tifertiensis Glöer, Mabrouki & Taybi, 2020
- Mercuria atlasica Glöer, Mabrouki & Taybi, 2021 - endemic to Morocco
- Mercuria bakeri Glöer, Boeters & Walther, 2015 - endemic to Morocco
- Mercuria confusa (Frauenfeld, 1838)
- Mercuria gauthieri Glöer, Bouzid & Boeters, 2010
- Mercuria halouii Taybi, Glöer & Mabrouki, 2022
- Mercuria midarensis Boulaassafer, Ghamizi & Delicado, 2018 - endemic to Morocco
- Mercuria nadorensis Taybi, Glöer & Mabrouki, 2022
- Mercuria targouasensis Glöer, Boeters & Walther, 2015 - endemic to Morocco
- Mercuria tensiftensis Boulaassafer, Ghamizi & Delicado, 2018 - endemic to Morocco
- Mercuria tingitana Glöer, Boeters & Walther, 2015 - endemic to Morocco
- Pikasia smenensis Taybi, Glöer & Mabrouki, 2021
- Pseudamnicola berrahoui Taybi, Glöer & Mabrouki, 2022
- Pseudamnicola bouhaddiouii Taybi, Glöer & Mabrouki, 2022
- Pseudamnicola dupotetiana (Forbes, 1838)
- Pseudamnicola leprevieri (Pallary, 1926)
- Pseudamnicola luteola (Küster, 1852)
- Pseudamnicola pallaryi Ghamizi, Vala & Bouka, 1997
- Pseudamnicola skourensis Taybi, Glöer & Mabrouki, 2022
- Pseudamnicola tafoughaltensis Taybi, Glöer & Mabrouki, 2022
- Rifia yacoubii Ghamizi, 2020
- Peringia ulvae (Pennant, 1777)
- Corrosella pallaryi (Ghamizi, Vala & Bouka, 1997)

Moitessieriidae

- Iglica seyadi Backhyus & Boeters, 1974
- Iglica soussensis Ghamizi & Boulal, 2017

Neritidae

- Neritina tingitana (Pallary, 1899) - endemic
- Theodoxus numidicus (Recluz, 1841)
- Theodoxus maresi (Bourguignat, 1864)
- Theodoxus fluviatilis (Linnaeus, 1758)
- Theodoxus marteli (Pallary, 1918)

Bulinidae

- Bulinus truncatus (Audouin, 1827)

Tateidae

- Potamopyrgus antipodarum (J.E. Gray, 1843)

Melanopsidae

- Melanopsis cariosa (Linné, 1767)
- Melanopsis tingitana (Morelet, 1864) - endemic
- Melanopsis tricarinata (Bruguière, 1789)
- Melanopsis praemorsa (Linnaeus, 1758)
- Melanopsis magnifica (Bourguignat, 1884) - endemic
- Melanopsis letourneuxi (Bourguignat, 1884) - endemic
- Melanopsis mourebeyensis (Pallary, 1901) - endemic
- Melanopsis edrissiana (Pallary, 1918) - endemic
- Melanopsis buccinoidea (Olivier, 1801)
- Melanopsis brevicula (Pallary, 1918) - endemic
- Melanopsis mellalensis (Pallary, 1928) - endemic
- Melanopsis ricardi (Pallary, 1918) - endemic
- Melanopsis marteli (Pallary, 1920) - endemic
- Melanopsis amabilis (Pallary, 1928) - endemic
- Melanopsis foleyi (Pallary, 1920) - endemic
- Melanopsis douttei (Pallary, 1911) - endemic
- Melanopsis gracilenta (Pallary, 1911) - endemic
- Melanopsis fasensis (Pallary, 1920) - endemic
- Melanopsis excoriata (Pallary, 1920) - endemic
- Melanopsis mogadorensis (Pallary, 1911) - endemic
- Melanopsis barbini (Pallary, 1911)
- Melanopsis scalaris (Gassies, 1856)
- Melanopsis laevigata (Lamarck, 1816)
- Melanopsis scalaris (Gassies, 1856)
- Melanopsis algerica (Pallary, 1904)
- Melanopsis pseudoferussaci (Pallary, 1899)

Planorbidae

- Bulinus truncatus (Audouin, 1827)
- Gyraulus marocana Youness, Glöer & Taybi, 2022
- Ancylus fluviatilis (Müller, 1774)
- Planorbarius metidjensis (Forbes, 1838)

Lymnaeidae

- Galba truncatula (O. F. Müller, 1774)
- Lymnaea peregra (Müller, 1774)
- Lymnaea stagnalis (Linnaeus, 1758)
- Radix labiata (Rossmässler, 1835)
- Stagnicola palustris (Müller, 1774)

Physidae

- Physella acuta (Draparnaud, 1805)

== Land gastropods ==
Land gastropods in Morocco include:

Achatinidae

- Rumina decollata (Linnaeus, 1758)
- Rumina saharica (Pallary, 1901)

Chondrinidae

- Chondrina marmouchana (Pallary, 1928) - endemic

Geomitridae

- Cochlicella acuta (O.F.Müller, 1774)
- Cochlicella conoidea (Draparnaud, 1801)
- Xeroleuca conopsis (Morelet, 1876) - endemic
- Xeroleuca degenerans (Mousson, 1873)
- Xeroleuca turcica (Holten, 1802)
- Xeroleuca mograbina (Morelet, 1852) - endemic
- Xeroleuca brulardi (Pallary, 1913) - endemic
- Xeroplexa intersecta (Poiret, 1801)
- Xerotricha apicina (Lamarck, 1822)
- Xerotricha conspurcata (Draparnaud, 1801)
- Xerotricha vatonniana (Bourguignat, 1867)
- Obelus pumilio (Dillwyn, 1817)
- Cernuella virgata (Da Costa, 1778)

Ferussaciidae

- Ferussacia atlasica (Pallary, 1915) - endemic
- Ferussacia folliculus (Gmelin, 1791)
- Ferussacia folliculum (Schröter, 1784)

Chondrinidae

- Chondrina calpica (Westerlund, 1872)

Trissexodontidae

- Oestophora dorotheae (P.Hesse, 1930)
- Oestophora tarnieri (Morelet, 1854)
- Oestophora maroccana (Morelet, 1876) - endemic
- Caracollina huloti (Pallary, 1913) - endemic
- Hatumia riffensis (Ortiz de Zarate López, 1962) - endemic

Strophocheilidae

- Maghrebiola soltanensis (Jodot, 1938) - endemic

Milacidae

- Milax gagates (Draparnaud, 1801)

Pupillidae

- Pupa tongriana (Mayer-Eymar, 1889) - endemic

Parmacellidae

- Parmacella deshayesi Moquin-Tandon, 1848
- Drusia deshayesii (Moquin-Tandon, 1848)
- Drusia alexantoni (Martínez-Ortí & Borredà, 2013) - endemic

Pristilomatidae

- Vitrea margjuliae (A.Riedel, 1976) - endemic

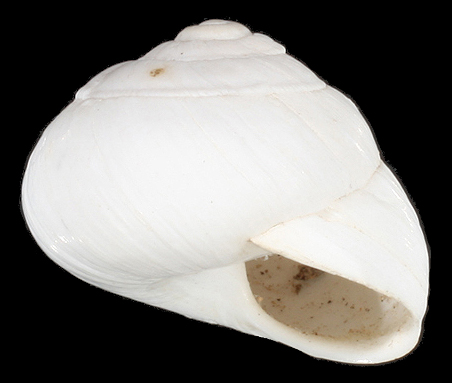
A shell of Sphincterochila baetica

Sphincterochilidae

- Sphincterochila baetica (Rossmässler, 1854)
- Sphincterochila candidissima (Draparnaud, 1801)
- Sphincterochila cariosula (Michaud, 1833)
- Albea marocana (Pallary, 1926) - endemic

Pomatiidae

- Leonia scrobiculata (Mousson, 1873) - endemic
- Leonia mammillaris (Lamarck, 1822)
- Tudorella mauretanica (Pallary, 1898)

Oxychilidae

- Oxychilus draparnaudi (H.Beck, 1837)

Hygromiidae

- Helicopsis conopsis Morelet, 1876 - endemic

Helicidae

- Cornu aspersum (O.F.Müller, 1774)
- Loxana beaumieri (Mousson, 1873)
- Loxana alabastrites (Michaud, 1833)
- Loxana rerayana (Mousson, 1873)
- Loxana rufa (Pallary, 1918) - endemic
- Theba pisana (O. F. Müller, 1774)
- Theba sacchii (E.Gittenberger & Ripken, 1987) - endemic
- Theba subdentata (A.Férussac, 1821)
- Theba solimae (Sacchi, 1955) - endemic
- Theba chudeaui (Germain, 1908) - endemic
- Otala lactea (O.F.Müller, 1774)
- Otala punctata (O.F.Müller, 1774)
- Otala tigri (P.Fischer, 1857)
- Otala lucasii (Deshayes, 1850)
- Otala pallaryi (Kobelt, 1909) - endemic
- Otala xanthodon (Anton, 1838)
- Otala orientalis (Pallary, 1918) - endemic
- Eremina vermiculosa (Morelet, 1874)
- Eremina dillwyniana (L.Pfeiffer, 1853)
- Eremina inexspectata (Llabador, 1960) - endemic
- Eremina duroi (Hidalgo, 1886) - endemic
- Rossmaessleria scherzeri (Zelebor, 1867)
- Rossmaessleria boettgeri (Kobelt, 1889) - endemic
- Rossmaessleria sicanoides (Kobelt, 1881) - endemic
- Rossmaessleria sultana (Morelet, 1880) - endemic
- Rossmaessleria galindoae (Torres Alba & Ahuir, 2011)
- Pseudotachea liturata (L.Pfeiffer, 1853)
- Alabastrina subvanvincquiae (Pallary, 1904) - endemic
- Eobania vermiculata (O.F.Müller, 1774)
- Caucasotachea vindobonensis (C.Pfeiffer, 1828)

== Freshwater bivalves ==
Unionidae

- Potomida littoralis (Cuvier, 1798)
- Unio durieui (Deshayes, 1874)

== See also ==
Lists of molluscs of surrounding countries:

- List of non-marine molluscs of Spain
- List of non-marine molluscs of Algeria
- List of non-marine molluscs of Mauritania
- List of non-marine molluscs of Western Sahara, Wildlife of Western Sahara
- List of non-marine molluscs of Portugal
- List of non-marine molluscs of the Canary Islands
