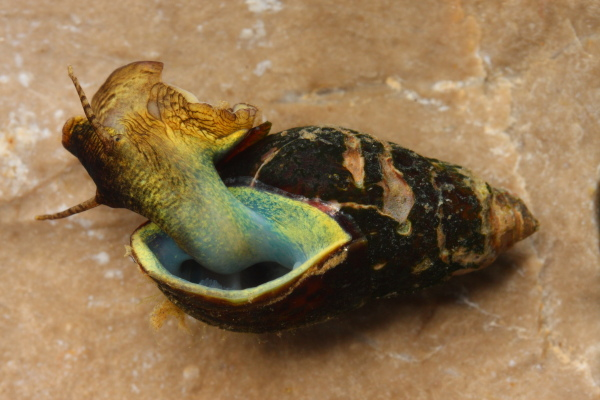
- A live Esperiana esperi out of water

Scientific classification
- Kingdom: Animalia
- Phylum: Mollusca
- Class: Gastropoda
- Subclass: Caenogastropoda
- Order: incertae sedis
- Family: Melanopsidae
- Genus: Esperiana; Bourguignat, 1877

Synonyms
- Melanopsis (Esperiana) Bourguignat, 1877; Fagotia Bourguignat, 1884

= Esperiana =

Genus of gastropods

Esperiana is a genus of freshwater snails in the family Melanopsidae. Its closest relatives are Melanopsis and Microcolpia. The genus is distributed in southern and eastern Europe extending into Anatolia (Lake Sapanca).

== Species ==
There are three recognized species:

- Esperiana esperi (A. Férussac, 1823)
- Esperiana roseni (Starobogatov, 1992)
- Esperiana sangarica (Schütt & Bilgin, 1974)
