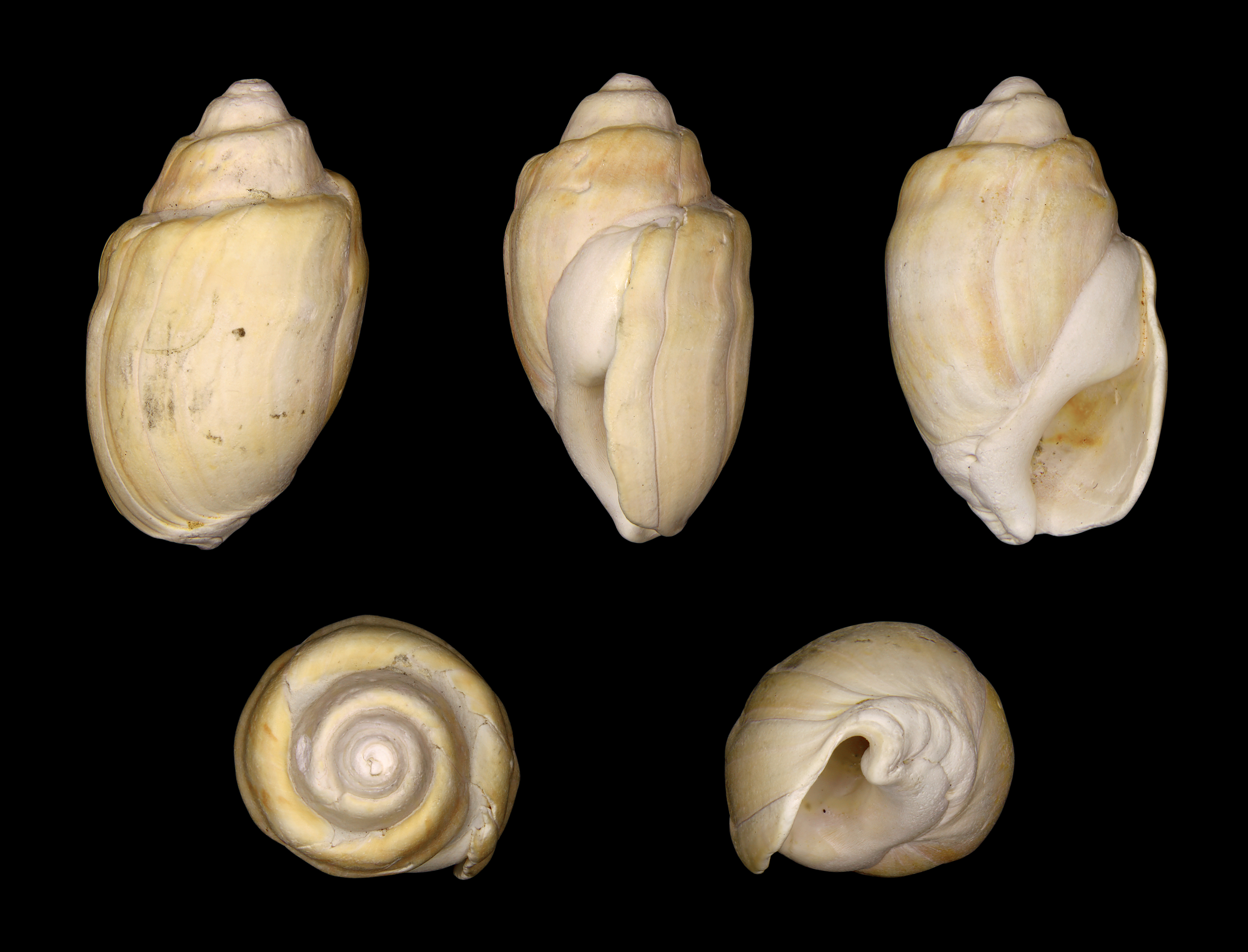
- Shell of Melanopsis fossilis

Scientific classification
- Kingdom: Animalia
- Phylum: Mollusca
- Class: Gastropoda
- Subclass: Caenogastropoda
- Order: incertae sedis
- Superfamily: Cerithioidea
- Family: Melanopsidae
- Genus: Melanopsis
- Species: M. fossilis

Binomial name
- Melanopsis fossilis (Gmelin, 1791)

Synonyms
- † Buccinum fossile Gmelin, 1791 superseded combination; † Lyrcaea fossilis (Gmelin, 1791) superseded combination (Lyrcea [sic] is considered a junior synonym of Melanopsis); † Melanopsis capulus Handmann, 1882 junior subjective synonym; † Melanopsis fossilis var. accedens Handmann, 1887 junior subjective synonym; † Melanopsis fossilis var. proclivis Handmann, 1887 junior subjective synonym; † Melanopsis fossilis var. propinqua Handmann, 1887 junior subjective synonym; † Melanopsis impressa martiniana A. Férussac, 1823 junior objective synonym; † Melanopsis martiniana A. Férussac, 1823 junior objective synonym; † Melanopsis martiniana turriculata Pallary, 1916; † Melanopsis spiralis Handmann, 1882 junior subjective synonym

= Melanopsis fossilis =

Species of gastropod

Melanopsis fossilis is an extinct species of sea snail, a freshwater gastropod mollusk in the family Melanopsidae.

== Nomenclature ==
The taxon was first mentioned in the Catalogus by Walch (1768, p. 121, pl. C. II.*, figs 1-5), yet without name. Martini (1777, p. 203, pl. 94, figs 912-914) described and illustrated the species as Pyrum fossile monstrosum f. amorphon and referred to Walch's work. Martini's work is, however, not available according to Op. 184 of the Code. Gmelin (1791, p. 3485) referred to Martini's work, described the species and was the first to assign a valid name to the taxon ("Buccinum fossile").

Férussac (1823), who was the first to combine the species with Melanopsis, listed the records by Walch, Martini as well as Gmelin but apparently did not consider fossile a valid name and introduced Melanopsis martiniana as new name. That name is an objective synonym and thus permanently invalid (see also Pallary, 1916, p. 81).

Papp (1953) designated the specimen illustrated by Martini (1777, pl. 94, figs 913) as lectotype. Since Gmelin referred to the same specimens when describing the species, this designation is valid (see also Art. 74.5).

The last summary of the status of M. fossilis was provided by Fischer (1996), but his conclusions were unfortunately based on misinterpretations and nomenclatural errors. He was unaware of the fact that Melanopsis martiniana is an objective synonym of M. fossilis. Moreover, he considered the outcrops near Siegendorf as "Locus typicus restrictus", a term not existing in nomenclature.

Subspecies

- † Melanopsis fossilis coaequata Handmann, 1887
- † Melanopsis fossilis fossilis (Gmelin, 1791)
- † Melanopsis fossilis handmanniana W. Fischer, 1996

== Distribution ==
Fossils of this marine species were found in Miocene strata in Moravia, Tsjech Republic; also in Hungary.
