= Melanopsis rifi =

Scientific classification
- Domain: Eukaryota
- Kingdom: Animalia
- Phylum: Mollusca
- Class: Gastropoda
- Subclass: Caenogastropoda
- Family: Melanopsidae
- Genus: Melanopsis
- Species: M. rifi

Binomial name
- Melanopsis rifi Ahuir, 2014

Species of freshwater gastropod

Melanopsis rifi is a minute species of freshwater gastropod in the family Melanopsidae, endemic to a small spring in the south-eastern Rich region of Morocco.
