= Melanopsis brevicula =

Conservation status
- Critically Endangered (IUCN 3.1)

Scientific classification
- Kingdom: Animalia
- Phylum: Mollusca
- Class: Gastropoda
- Subclass: Caenogastropoda
- Order: incertae sedis
- Family: Melanopsidae
- Genus: Melanopsis
- Species: M. brevicula

Binomial name
- Melanopsis brevicula Pallary, 1918

Species of gastropod

Melanopsis brevicula is a small species of gastropod endemic to small streams near Agourai, Morocco. It is distinctive due to its minute size, flattened sculpture, low spire, and small aperture. It is known from a single location 10 km^{2} in area (Oued Ain Maarouf) which has been well surveyed, and found to be threatened by increasing human population, droughts of increasing extremity, water diversion, and pastoralization. Shell collecting presents a minor threat to populations. The species has been classified as critically endangered by the IUCN.
