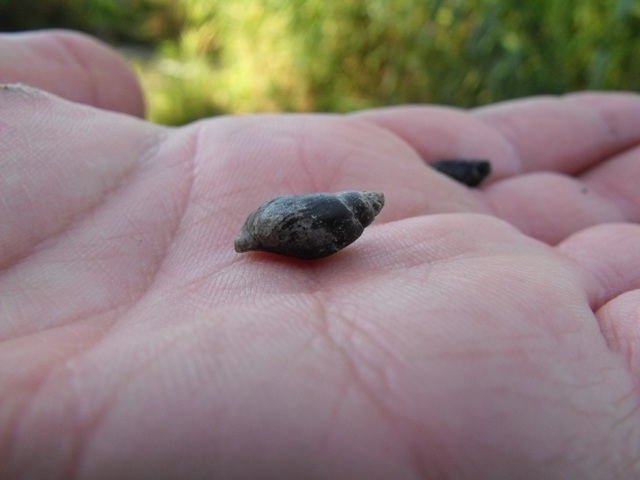

Conservation status
- Endangered (IUCN 3.1)

Scientific classification
- Kingdom: Animalia
- Phylum: Mollusca
- Class: Gastropoda
- Subclass: Caenogastropoda
- Family: Melanopsidae
- Genus: Melanopsis
- Species: M. etrusca

Binomial name
- Melanopsis etrusca Brot, 1862

= Melanopsis etrusca =

Species of gastropod

Melanopsis etrusca is a species of freshwater snail in the family Melanopsidae. It is endemic to southern Tuscany, central Italy, where it is found in hot springs. Today it is known from only four locations and its populations are decreasing. It is threatened by the draining of its hot spring habitat.
