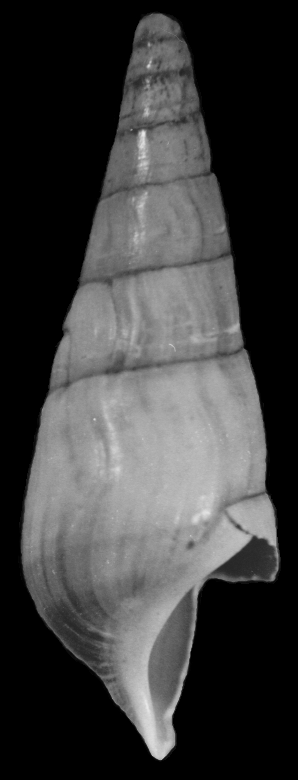
- Shell of Microcolpia wuesti

Scientific classification
- Kingdom: Animalia
- Phylum: Mollusca
- Class: Gastropoda
- Subclass: Caenogastropoda
- Order: incertae sedis
- Family: Melanopsidae
- Genus: Microcolpia
- Species: †M. wuesti

Binomial name
- †Microcolpia wuesti (Meijer, 1990)

Synonyms
- †Fagotia wuesti Meijer, 1990

= Microcolpia wuesti =

Microcolpia wuesti Temporal range: Early Pleistocene

Extinct species of gastropod

Microcolpia wuesti is an extinct species of freshwater snail with an operculum, an aquatic gastropod mollusk in the family Melanopsidae. Originally described as Fagotia wuesti, it was later revised as a member of Microcolpia.

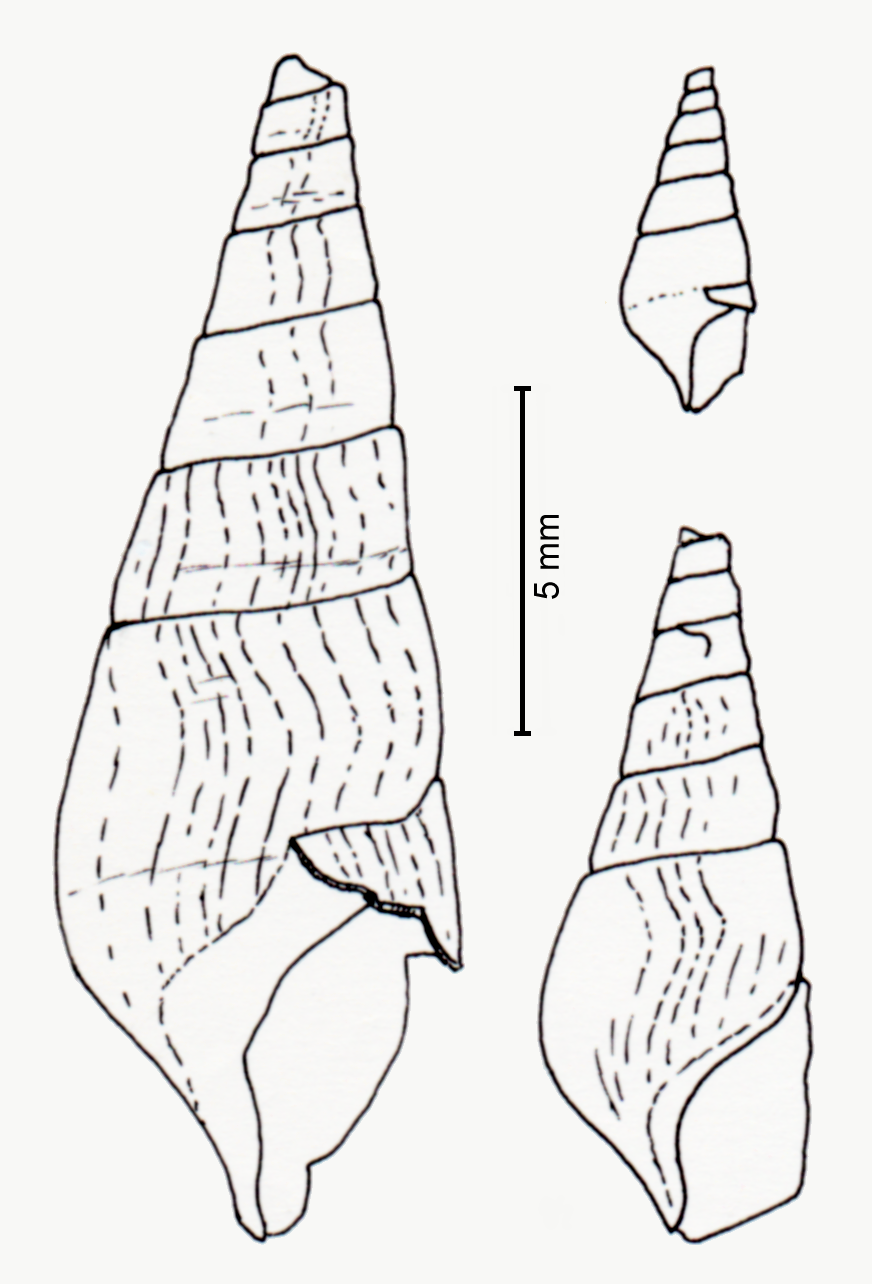
Shells of Microcolpia wuesti
