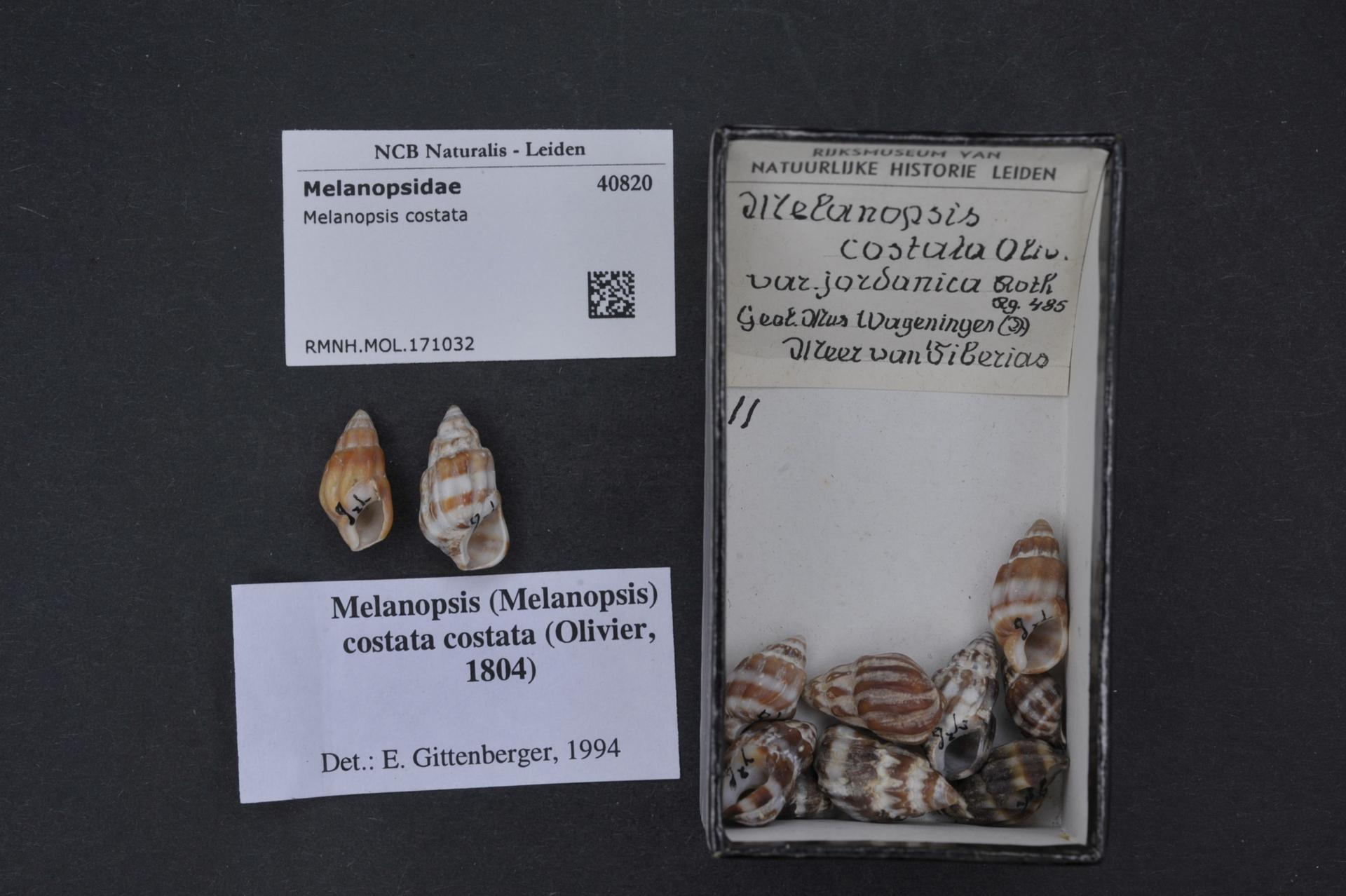

Scientific classification
- Kingdom: Animalia
- Phylum: Mollusca
- Class: Gastropoda
- Subclass: Caenogastropoda
- Order: incertae sedis
- Family: Melanopsidae
- Genus: Melanopsis
- Species: M. costata

Binomial name
- Melanopsis costata (Olivier, 1804)

= Melanopsis costata =

Species of gastropod

Melanopsis costata is a species of gastropods belonging to the family Melanopsidae.

The species is found in freshwater environments.
