= List of non-marine molluscs of Algeria =

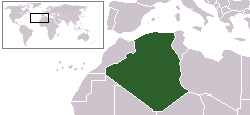
Location of Algeria

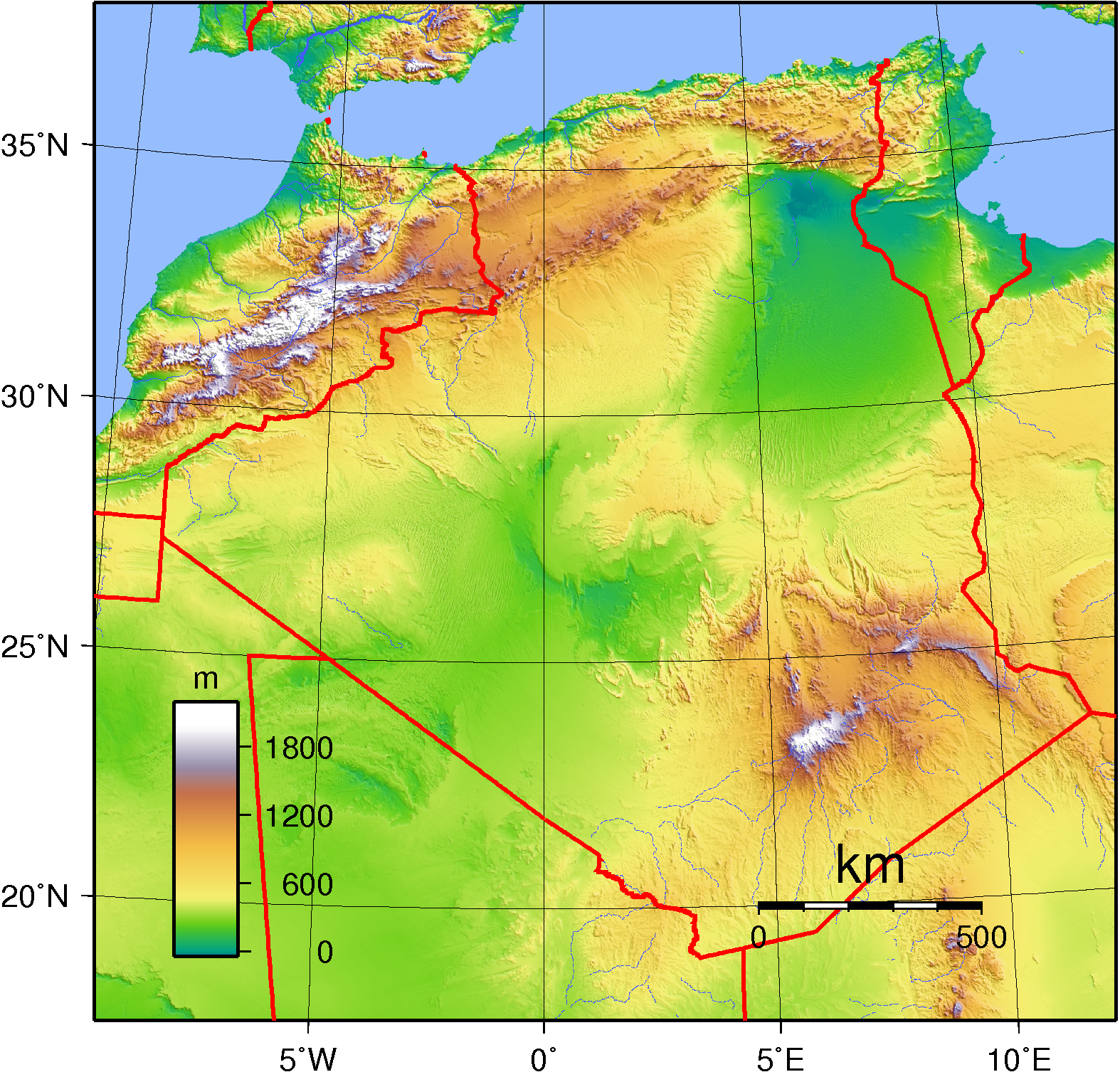
topography of Algeria

A number of species of non-marine molluscs are found in the wild in Algeria.

== Freshwater gastropods ==
Hydrobiidae

- Mercuria bourguignati Glöer, Bouzid & Boeters, 2010
- Mercuria gauthieri Glöer, Bouzid & Boeters, 2010
- Mercuria globulina (Letourneux & Bourguignat, 1887)
- Mercuria pycnocheilia (Bourguignat, 1862)
- Mercuria saharica (Bourguignat, 1887)
- Pseudamnicola algeriensis Glöer, Bouzid & Boeters, 2010
- Pseudamnicola boucheti Glöer, Bouzid & Boeters, 2010
- Pseudamnicola calamensis Glöer, Bouzid & Boeters, 2010
- Pseudamnicola chabii Glöer, Bouzid & Boeters, 2010
- Pseudamnicola constantinae (Letourneux, 1870)
- Pseudamnicola dupotetiana (Forbes, 1838)
- Pseudamnicola fineti Glöer, Bouzid & Boeters, 2010
- Pseudamnicola gerhardfalkneri Glöer, Bouzid & Boeters, 2010
- Pseudamnicola ghamizii Glöer, Bouzid & Boeters, 2010
- Pseudamnicola letourneuxiana (Bourguignat, 1862)
- Pseudamnicola linae Glöer, Bouzid & Boeters, 2010
- Pseudamnicola luteola (Küster, 1852)
- Pseudamnicola meluzzi Boeters, 1976
- Pseudamnicola numidica (Clessin, 1878)
- Pseudamnicola rouagi Glöer, Bouzid & Boeters, 2010

Planorbidae

- Armiger crista (Linnaeus, 1758) - nautilus ramshorn snail
- Hippeutis complanatus (Linnaeus, 1758) - flat ramshorn snail
- Bulinus truncatus (Michaud, 1829)
- Ferrissia californica (Rowell, 1863)
- Planorbis planorbis (Linnaeus, 1758)

== Land gastropods ==
Pomatiidae

- Tudorella sulcata (Draparnaud, 1805)

Cochlostomatidae

- Cochlostoma atlanticum (Bourguignat, 1868)

Spiraxidae

- Poiretia algira (Bruguière, 1792)

Chondrinidae

- Granopupa granum (Draparnaud, 1801)
- Rupestrella michaudi (Bourguignat, 1862)

Enidae

- Mastus pupa (Linnaeus, 1758)
- Mauronapaeus terverii (Forbes, 1838)

Ferussaciidae

- Ferussacia folliculum (Schröter, 1784)
- Ferussacia carnea (Risso, 1826)

Discidae

- Discus rotundatus (Müller, 1774) - rotund disc

Punctidae

- Paralaoma servilis (Shuttleworth, 1852)

Milacidae

- Milax gagates (Draparnaud, 1801) - greenhouse slug
- Milax nigricans (Schulz in Philippi, 1836)

Sphincterochilidae

- Sphincterochila candidissima (Draparnaud, 1801)
- Sphincterochila otthianus (Bourguignat, 1864)
- Sphincterochila piestius (Bourguignat, 1864)

Valloniidae

- Plagyrona placida (Shuttleworth, 1852)

Subulinidae

- Rumina decollata (Linnaeus, 1758) - decollate snail

Testacellidae

- Testacella fischeriana Bourguignat, 1861
- Testacella riedeli Giusti, Manganelli et Schembri, 1995

Agriolimacidae

- Deroceras riedelianum Wiktor, 1983

Limacidae

- Ambigolimax nyctelius (Bourguignat, 1861)

Trissexodontidae

- Caracollina lenticula (Férussac, 1821) - lens snail

Hygromiidae

- Ganula flava (Terver, 1839)

Geomitridae

- Cochlicella barbara (Linnaeus, 1758)
- Cochlicella conoidea (Draparnaud, 1801)
- Trochoidea elegans (Gmelin, 1791)
- Trochoidea pyramidata (Brown, 1827)
- Xerosecta cespitum (Draparnaud, 1801)
- Xerotricha conspurcata (Draparnaud, 1801)

Helicidae

- Archelix juilleti Terver, 1839
- Archelix lactea (Müller, 1774)
- Archelix polita punctatiana Gassies, 1836
- Archelix punctata (Müller, 1774)
- Archelix wagneri Terver, 1839
- Archelix zapharina Terver, 1839
- Cantareus apertus (Born, 1778) - green garden snail
- Cantareus koraegaelius (Bourguignat in Locard, 1882)
- Cantareus subapertus (Ancey, 1893)
- Cochlicella acuta (O. F. Müller, 1774) - pointed snail
- Eobania vermiculata (O. F. Müller, 1774)
- Euparypha pisana (O. F. Müller, 1774)
- Helicella acompsia (Bourguignat, 1864)
- Helicella globuloïdea (Terver, 1839)
- Helicella lauta (R. T. Lowe, 1831)
- Helicella pyramidata (Draparnaud, 1805)
- Helicella terveri Michaud, 1831
- Helicella virgata (da Costa, 1778)
- Helix (Alabastrina) alabastrites Michaud, 1833
- Helix (Alabastrina) soluta Michaud, 1833
- Helix aspersa (Müller, 1774) - garden snail
- Macularia hieroglyphicula Michaud, 1833
- Macularia jourdaniana Bourguignat, 1867
- Massylaea constantina (Forbes, 1838)

== Freshwater bivalves ==
Sphaeriidae

- Musculium lacustre (O.F. Müller, 1774) - lake fingernail clam

== See also ==
Lists of molluscs of surrounding countries:

- List of non-marine molluscs of Morocco, Wildlife of Morocco
- List of non-marine molluscs of Tunisia, Wildlife of Tunisia
- List of non-marine molluscs of Libya, Wildlife of Libya
- Wildlife of Mauritania
- Wildlife of Western Sahara
- Wildlife of Mali
- Wildlife of Niger
