= Melanopsis magnifica =

Conservation status
- Endangered (IUCN 3.1)

Scientific classification
- Kingdom: Animalia
- Phylum: Mollusca
- Class: Gastropoda
- Subclass: Caenogastropoda
- Order: incertae sedis
- Family: Melanopsidae
- Genus: Melanopsis
- Species: M. magnifica

Binomial name
- Melanopsis magnifica Bourguignat, 1884

Species of gastropod

Melanopsis magnifica is a species of freshwater gastropod endemic to oases and wadis in Morocco.

== Distribution and habitat ==
Melanopsis magnifica exists mainly (though not exclusively) in shallow streams with stony substrates. It occurs in several localities, only three of which are recognized by the IUCN: Berkane, Fez, and Ouadi Korifla in Morocco. It also occurs in Ain Chkef, Agourai, Oued Boufakrane, Ain Chair, Ras Kebdana, Meknes, etc. Known M. magnifica populations are close to urban areas and are prone to population impacts as a result of pollution and habitat modification.

== Taxonomy ==
Melanopsis magnifica is defined historically be several subspecies and forms, excluding the nominal forms:

- Melanopsis magnifica berkanensis P.M. Pallary, 1911
- Melanopsis magnifica expansa P.M. Pallary, 1920
- Melanopsis magnifica ingens P.M. Pallary, 1927-28
- Melanopsis magnifica oranensis P.M. Pallary, 1911
- Melanopsis magnifica concolor P.M. Pallary, 1927
- Melanopsis magnifica serira P.M. Pallary, 1920
- Melanopsis magnifica senilis P.M. Pallary, 1939
