= Poiretia =

Poiretia is the scientific name of two genera of organisms and may refer to:

- Poiretia (gastropod), a genus of molluscs in the family Spiraxidae
- Poiretia (plant), a genus of plants in the family Fabaceae
