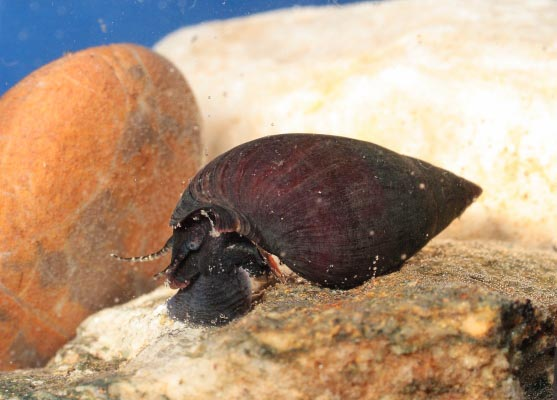
- A live Melanopsis praemorsa
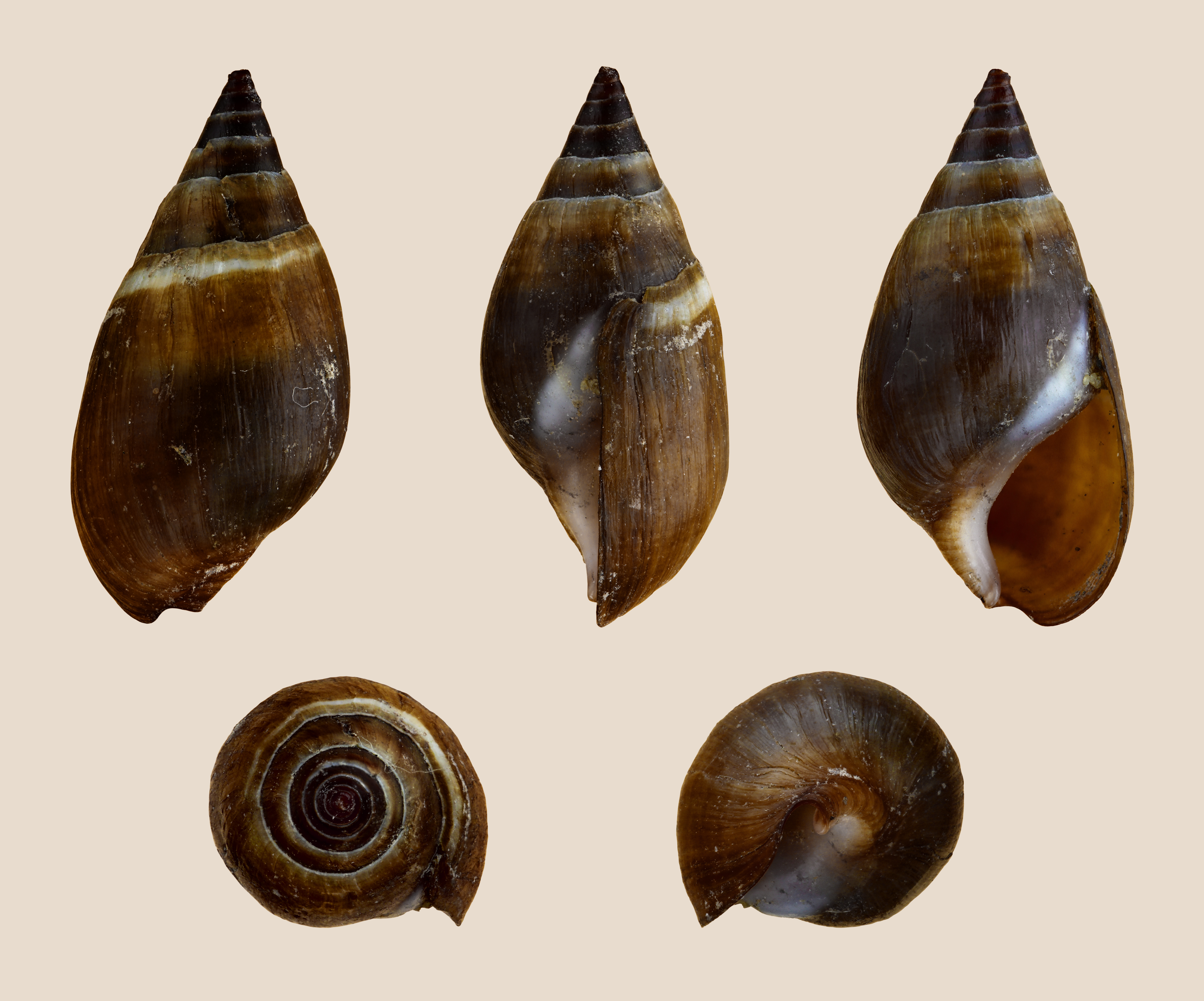
- Five views of a shell of Melanopsis buccinoidea

Scientific classification
- Kingdom: Animalia
- Phylum: Mollusca
- Class: Gastropoda
- Subclass: Caenogastropoda
- Order: incertae sedis
- Family: Melanopsidae
- Genus: Melanopsis; Férussac, 1807

Synonyms
- † Boistelia Cossmann, 1909; † Lyrcaea Adams & Adams, 1854 † (junior synonym; misspelling (pro Lyrcea)); Lyrcea H. Adams & A. Adams, 1854; † Macrospira F. Sandberger, 1872 (invalid: junior homonym of Macrospira Swainson, 1840; Melanoptychia is a replacement name); Melanopsis (Canthidomus) Swainson, 1840; † Melanopsis (Homalia) Handmann, 1887 (junior homonym of Homalia Eschscholtz, 1831; junior synonym); † Melanopsis (Lyrcaea) Adams & Adams, 1854 (junior synonym; misspelling (pro Lyrcea)); † Melanopsis (Lyrcea) Adams & Adams, 1854; † Melanopsis (Martinia) Handmann, 1887 (junior homonym of Martinia M'Coy, 1844; junior synonym); Melanopsis (Melanopsis) Férussac, 1807; † Melanopsis (Melanoptychia) Neumayr, 1880; † Melanoptychia Neumayr, 1880

= Melanopsis =

Melanopsis Temporal range: Cretaceous–recent

Genus of gastropods

Melanopsis is a genus of freshwater snails with a gill and an operculum, aquatic gastropod mollusks in the family Melanopsidae.

The genus first appeared in the Cretaceous.

Melanopsis is the type genus of the family Melanopsidae.

== Distribution ==
These snails are found in southern Europe, North Africa, Asia Minor, New Caledonia and New Zealand.

== Description ==
Their shells are ovate, with a short spire, and a large elongated body whorl. The outer lip of the aperture is thin, but the inner lip has a smooth parietal callus, thickened into a pad over the parietal wall.

== Species ==
Species within the genus Melanopsis include:

- † Melanopsis aaronsohni Blanckenhorn in Blanckenhorn & Oppenheim, 1927 †
- † Melanopsis abbreviata Brusina, 1874
- Melanopsis abichi Calvert & Neumayr, 1880
- † Melanopsis acanthica Neumayr, 1869
- † Melanopsis acanthicoides Hoernes, 1877
- † Melanopsis acuta Handmann, 1882
- † Melanopsis aetolica Neumayr, 1876
- † Melanopsis affinis Férussac, 1819
- Melanopsis ahuiri Ahuir, 2014
- † Melanopsis ajkaensis Tausch, 1886
- † Melanopsis alutensis Stefanescu, 1896
- Melanopsis ammonis Tristram, 1865
- † Melanopsis anceps Gaudry & Fischer in Gaudry, 1867
- † Melanopsis ancillaroidesDeshayes, 1825
- Melanopsis andrussowi Brusina, 1885
- † Melanopsis angulata Neumayr, 1880
- † Melanopsis anili Taner, 1997
- † Melanopsis anistratenkoi Neubauer, Harzhauser, Georgopoulou, Mandic & Kroh, 2014
- † Melanopsis antediluviana(Poiret, 1801)
- Melanopsis arbalensis Pérès, 1939
- † Melanopsis arsinovi Brusina, 1902
- † Melanopsis astathmeta Brusina, 1897
- † Melanopsis astrapaea Brusina, 1876
- † Melanopsis atanasiui Schoverth, 1953
- † Melanopsis austriaca Handmann, 1882
- † Melanopsis avellana F. Sandberger, 1870
- † Melanopsis balatonensis (Cossmann, 1909)
- † Melanopsis banatica Jekelius, 1944
- † Melanopsis bandeli Schütt, 1988
- † Melanopsis barthai Bandel, 2000
- † Melanopsis bartolinii Capellini, 1873
- † Melanopsis bergeroni Stefanescu, 1896
- † Melanopsis bicoronata Brusina, 1884
- † Melanopsis bleunardi Porumbaru, 1881
- † Melanopsis bonelli Manzoni, 1870
- † Melanopsis bouei Férussac, 1823
- † Melanopsis brachyptycha Neumayr, 1880
- † Melanopsis braueri Neumayr in Neumayr & Paul, 1875
- † Melanopsis breastensis Stefanescu, 1896
- Melanopsis brevicula Pallary, 1918
- † Melanopsis brongniarti Locard, 1883
- † Melanopsis brusinai Lörenthey, 1902
- Melanopsis buccinoidea (Olivier, 1801)
- † Melanopsis buccinulum Melleville, 1843
- † Melanopsis bukovaci Brusina, 1902
- † Melanopsis camptogramma Brusina, 1876
- † Melanopsis capreniensis Fontannes, 1887
- † Melanopsis carasiensis Jekelius, 1944
- † Melanopsis cari Pavlović, 1927
- Melanopsis cariosa (Linnaeus, 1767)
- † Melanopsis carusi (Brusina, 1902)
- † Melanopsis caryota Brusina, 1902
- Melanopsis cerithiopsis
- Melanopsis chlorotica Pallary, 1921
- † Melanopsis cikosi Brusina, 1902
- † Melanopsis citharella Merian, 1849
- † Melanopsis clava Sandberger, 1875
- † Melanopsis clavigera Neumayr in Neumayr & Paul, 1875
- † Melanopsis coaequata
- † Melanopsis cognata Brusina, 1878
- † Melanopsis confusa Strausz, 1941
- † Melanopsis conoidea Pană, 2003
- † Melanopsis constricta Brusina, 1878
- † Melanopsis corici Neubauer, Mandic, Harzhauser & Hrvatović, 2013
- † Melanopsis coronata Brusina, 1878
- † Melanopsis correcta Stefanescu, 1896
- Melanopsis costata (Olivier, 1804)
- † Melanopsis cotrocenensis Cobălcescu, 1883
- † Melanopsis covurluensis Cobălcescu, 1883
- † Melanopsis croatica Brusina, 1884
- † Melanopsis cuisiensis Dominici & Kowalke, 2014
- † Melanopsis cvijici Brusina, 1902
- † Melanopsis cylindrica (Stoliczka, 1862)
- † Melanopsis dalmatina Brusina, 1884
- † Melanopsis decollata Stoliczka, 1862
- † Melanopsis defensa Fuchs, 1870
- † Melanopsis delessei Tournouër, 1875
- † Melanopsis depereti Boistel, 1898
- † Melanopsis dianaeformis Andrusov, 1909
- † Melanopsis dichtli Handmann, 1882
- † Melanopsis doriae Issel, 1865
- † Melanopsis draghiceniani Cobălcescu, 1883
- † Melanopsis dufouri A. Férussac, 1822
- † Melanopsis eleis Oppenheim, 1891
- † Melanopsis elophila Pallary, 1925
- † Melanopsis entziBrusina, 1902: synonym of †Melanopsis fuchsi Handmann, 1882 (junior synonym)
- † Melanopsis esperioides Stefanescu, 1896
- Melanopsis etrusca Brot, 1862
- † Melanopsis eulimopsis Brusina, 1902
- † Melanopsis euphrosinae (Cobălcescu, 1883)
- † Melanopsis eurystoma Neumayr in Neumayr & Paul, 1875
- † Melanopsis faberi Brusina, 1884
- † Melanopsis fallax Pantanelli, 1886
- † Melanopsis fateljensis Neubauer, Mandic & Harzhauser, 2014
- Melanopsis ferussaci
- † Melanopsis filifera Neumayr, 1880
- † Melanopsis fossilis (Gmelin, 1791) - late Neogene
- † Melanopsis freybergi Kühn, 1951
- † Melanopsis friedeli Brusina, 1885
- † Melanopsis fritzei Thomä, 1845
- Melanopsis frustulum Morelet, 1857
- † Melanopsis fuchsi Handmann, 1882
- † Melanopsis fusulatina Sacco, 1895
- † Melanopsis gearyae Neubauer, Harzhauser, Georgopoulou, Mandic & Kroh, 2014
- † Melanopsis geniculata Brusina, 1874
- † Melanopsis gersondei Willmann, 1981
- † Melanopsis glandicula Sandberger, 1875
- † Melanopsis glaubrechti Neubauer & Harzhauser in Neubauer et al., 2015
- † Melanopsis gorceixi Tournouër, 1875
- † Melanopsis graciosa Seninski, 1905
- † Melanopsis granum Calvert & Neumayr, 1880
- † Melanopsis guernei Brusina, 1902
- † Melanopsis handmanniana
- † Melanopsis hantkeni Hofmann, 1870
- † Melanopsis harpula Neumayr in Neumayr & Paul, 1875
- † Melanopsis hastata Neumayr in Neumayr & Paul, 1875
- † Melanopsis haueri Handmann, 1882
- Melanopsis heliophila Bourguignat, 1884
- † Melanopsis hennersdorfensis Fischer, 1993
- † Melanopsis hranilovici Brusina, 1897
- † Melanopsis hybostoma Brusina, 1874
- † Melanopsis impressa Krauss, 1852
- † Melanopsis incerta Férussac, 1823
- † Melanopsis inconstans Neumayr, 1869
- † Melanopsis inermis Handmann, 1882
- † Melanopsis inexspectata Willmann, 1981
- † Melanopsis involuta Handmann, 1882
- † Melanopsis irregularis Handmann, 1882
- Melanopsis isabelae Ahuir, 2016
- † Melanopsis karici Pavlović, 1903
- † Melanopsis katzeri Brusina, 1904
- † Melanopsis kleinii Kurr, 1856
- † Melanopsis klerici Brusina, 1893
- † Melanopsis kotschyi Philippi, 1847
- † Melanopsis krambergeri Brusina, 1884
- † Melanopsis kupensis Fuchs, 1870
- † Melanopsis kurdica Brusina, 1902
- † Melanopsis laevigata (Lamarck, 1792)
- † Melanopsis lanceolata Neumayr in Neumayr & Paul, 1875
- † Melanopsis langhofferi Pavlović, 1927†
- † Melanopsis lanzaeana Brusina, 1874†
- † Melanopsis laubrierei Carez, 1880
- † Melanopsis lebedai Lueger, 1980
- † Melanopsis lepavinensis Brusina, 1897†
- Melanopsis letourneuxi Bourguignat, 1880
- † Melanopsis lomnickii Wenz, 1928
- † Melanopsis longa Deshayes in Férussac, 1851
- † Melanopsis longirostris Pallary, 1920
- Melanopsis lorcana Guirao, 1854
- † Melanopsis lorentheyi Andrusov, 1909
- † Melanopsis lorioli Locard, 1893
- † Melanopsis lozanici Brusina, 1893
- † Melanopsis lucanensis Neubauer in Neubauer et al., 2011
- † Melanopsis lyrata Neumayr, 1869
- † Melanopsis macrosculpturata Papp, 1953
- † Melanopsis magna Lubenescu, 1985
- Melanopsis magnifica Bourguignat, 1884
- † Melanopsis magyari Neubauer, Harzhauser, Georgopoulou, Mandic & Kroh, 2014
- † Melanopsis major Férussac, 1823
- † Melanopsis mariei Crosse, 1869
- † Melanopsis medinae Neubauer, Mandic, Harzhauser & Hrvatović, 2013 (unaccepted, junior synonym)
- † Melanopsis metochiana Pavlović, 1932
- † Melanopsis minotauri Willmann, 1980
- † Melanopsis mitraeformis Andrusov, 1909
- † Melanopsis moesiensis Jekelius, 1944
- † Melanopsis mojsisovicsi (Neumayr, 1880)
- Melanopsis mourebeyensis Pallary, 1921
- † Melanopsis multiformis
- † Melanopsis narzolina d'Archiac in Viquesnel, 1846
- † Melanopsis nesici Brusina, 1893
- † Melanopsis neumayri Tournouër, 1874
- † Melanopsis nobilis Seninski, 1905
- † Melanopsis obediensis
- † Melanopsis obsoleta Fuchs, 1873
- † Melanopsis ogerieni Locard, 1883
- † Melanopsis olivula Grateloup, 1838
- † Melanopsis oltszakadatensis Halaváts, 1914
- † Melanopsis onusta Stefanescu, 1896
- † Melanopsis onychia Brusina, 1874
- † Melanopsis orientalis Bukowski, 1892
- † Melanopsis oroposi Papp, 1979
- † Melanopsis ovosimilis Willmann, 1981
- † Melanopsis ovularis Watelet, 1853
- † Melanopsis oxycantha Brusina, 1902
- † Melanopsis pachecoi Royo Gómez, 1922
- † Melanopsis papkesiensis Bandel, 2000
- † Melanopsis paradoxa (Brusina, 1892)
- Melanopsis parreyssii (Philippi, 1847) - synonym: Melanopsis hungarica Kormos, 1904
- † Melanopsis paulovici Bourguignat, 1880
- † Melanopsis pavlovici Brusina, 1902
- † Melanopsis pedemontana Sacco, 1889
- † Melanopsis pentagona Brusina, 1892
- † Melanopsis pergamena Calvert & Neumayr, 1880
- † Melanopsis petkovici Pavlović, 1931
- Melanopsis pechinati Bourguignat, 1868
- † Melanopsis petrovici Brusina, 1893
- † Melanopsis pleuroplagia (Bourguignat, 1880)
- † Melanopsis pleurotomoides Pavlović, 1927
- † Melanopsis plicatella Neumayr, 1880
- † Melanopsis plicatula Brusina, 1874
- † Melanopsis porumbari Porumbaru, 1881
- † Melanopsis posterior Papp, 1953
- † Melanopsis praecursor Schütt in Schütt & Ortal, 1993
- Melanopsis praemorsa (Linnaeus, 1758) - type species
- † Melanopsis protopygmaea Halaváts, 1914
- † Melanopsis pseudoaustriaca Sauerzopf, 1952
- † Melanopsis pseudobesa Bandel, 2000
- † Melanopsis pseudocostata Oppenheim, 1891
- † Melanopsis pseudoimpressa
- † Melanopsis pseudopygmaea Jekelius, 1944
- † Melanopsis pseudoscalaria Sandberger, 1886
- † Melanopsis pterochila Brusina, 1874
- † Melanopsis pumila (Brusina, 1902)
- † Melanopsis pusilla Handmann, 1882
- † Melanopsis pygmaea Hörnes, 1856
- † Melanopsis pyrum Neumayr in Neumayr & Paul, 1875
- † Melanopsis rarinodosa (Brusina, 1892)
- † Melanopsis recurrens Brusina, 1874
- † Melanopsis retusa Brusina, 1904
- † Melanopsis revelata Pallary, 1920
- † Melanopsis rhodanica Locard, 1883†
- Melanopsis rifi Ahuir, 2014
- † Melanopsis rudis Brusina, 1902
- † Melanopsis rumana Tournouër, 1880
- † Melanopsis sabolici Brusina, 1902
- Melanopsis saharica Bourguignat, 1864
- † Melanopsis salamei Alhejoj & Bandel, 2013
- † Melanopsis sandbergeri Neumayr, 1869
- Melanopsis saulcyi Bourguignat, 1853
- † Melanopsis scalariformis Papp, 1953
- Melanopsis scalaris Gassies, 1856
- † Melanopsis scansoria Stefanescu, 1896
- † Melanopsis scripta Fuchs, 1870
- † Melanopsis senatoria Handmann, 1887
- † Melanopsis seninskii Wenz, 1928
- † Melanopsis serbica Brusina, 1893
- † Melanopsis serchensis Vidal, 1874 - from Maastrichtian
- Melanopsis sharhabili Bandel, 2000
- † Melanopsis simulata Pallary, 1925
- † Melanopsis sinjana Brusina, 1874
- † Melanopsis sinzowi Brusina, 1885
- † Melanopsis slavonica Neumayr in Neumayr & Paul, 1875
- † Melanopsis soceni Jekelius, 1944
- † Melanopsis sodalis Deshayes, 1862
- † Melanopsis soldaniana Pantanelli, 1879
- † Melanopsis sostarici Brusina, 1897
- † Melanopsis soubeirani Porumbaru, 1881
- † Melanopsis spinicostata Rolle, 1860
- † Melanopsis spinigera Seninski, 1905
- † Melanopsis spiridioni Pallary, 1916
- † Melanopsis sporadum Tournouër, 1876
- † Melanopsis strangulata Brusina, 1902
- † Melanopsis striata Handmann, 1887
- † Melanopsis stricturata Brusina, 1892
- † Melanopsis sturi (unaccepted, rank changed)
- Melanopsis suarezi Ahuir, 2016
- † Melanopsis subangulosa Sandberger, 1875
- † Melanopsis subbuccinoides d'Orbigny, 1851
- Melanopsis subgraëllsiana Bourguignat, 1864
- † Melanopsis subpraerosa Andrusov, 1909
- † Melanopsis subpyrum Penecke, 1886
- † Melanopsis substricturata (Jekelius, 1944)
- † Melanopsis suskalovici Pavlović, 1903
- † Melanopsis synaniae Esu & Girotti, 2015
- † Melanopsis tenuiplicata Neumayr, 1880
- † Melanopsis tihanyensis (unaccepted, junior synonym)
- † Melanopsis timacensis Živković, 1893
- † Melanopsis tinnyensis Wenz, 1919
- † Melanopsis tortispina Papp, 1953
- Melanopsis tricarinata (Bruguière, 1789)
- † Melanopsis trivortiana Locard, 1883
- † Melanopsis trojana Hoernes, 1877
- † Melanopsis trstenjaki Brusina, 1884
- † Melanopsis tuberculata Pavlović, 1927
- Melanopsis turgida Pallary, 1927
- † Melanopsis turislavica Jekelius, 1944
- † Melanopsis turriformis
- † Melanopsis valdeci Brusina, 1902
- † Melanopsis vandeveldi Bukowski, 1892
- † Melanopsis varicosa Handmann, 1882
- † Melanopsis vilicici Brusina, 1902
- † Melanopsis vindobonensis Fuchs, 1870
- † Melanopsis viquesneli Pavlović, 1932
- † Melanopsis visianiana Brusina, 1874
- † Melanopsis vitalisi Strausz, 1942
- † Melanopsis vitezovici Brusina, 1902
- † Melanopsis vitzoui Porumbaru, 1881
- † Melanopsis vrcinensis Neubauer, Harzhauser, Georgopoulou, Mandic & Kroh, 2014
- Melanopsis wagneri
- † Melanopsis wilhelmi Esu & Girotti, 2015
- † Melanopsis wolfgangfischeri Neubauer, Harzhauser, Kroh, Georgopoulou & Mandic, 2014
- † Melanopsis zitteli Neumayr, 1869
- † Melanopsis zujovici Brusina, 1893

(Extinct taxa indicated by a dagger, †.)

Species brought into synonymy

- † Melanopsis abbreviata cosmanni Pallary, 1916: synonym of † Melanopsis abbreviata cossmanni Pallary, 1916
- † Melanopsis acanthicoides var. abichi Calvert & Neumayr, 1880: synonym of † Melanopsis abichi Calvert & Neumayr, 1880
- † Melanopsis acanthicoides var. pergamenica Calvert & Neumayr, 1880: synonym of † Melanopsis pergamena Calvert & Neumayr, 1880
- † Melanopsis acanthicoides var. trojana Hoernes, 1877: synonym of † Melanopsis trojana Hoernes, 1877
- Melanopsis aperta Gassies, 1863: synonym of Melanopsis frustulum Morelet, 1857
- Melanopsis aurantiaca Gassies, 1874: synonym of Melanopsis frustulum Morelet, 1857
- † Melanopsis austriaca var. serbica Brusina, 1902: synonym of † Melanopsis haueri ripanjensis Neubauer, Harzhauser, Kroh, Georgopoulou & Mandic, 2014
- Melanopsis brevis Morelet, 1857: synonym of Melanopsis frustulum Morelet, 1857
- Melanopsis brotiana Gassies, 1874: synonym of Melanopsis frustulum Morelet, 1857
- † Melanopsis callosa var. curta Locard, 1893: synonym of † Melanopsis kleinii kleinii Kurr, 1856
- Melanopsis carinata Gassies, 1863: synonym of Melanopsis frustulum Morelet, 1857
- Melanopsis curta Gassies, 1870: synonym of Melanopsis frustulum Morelet, 1857
- † Melanopsis cylindrica petrovici (Brusina, 1893): synonym of † Melanopsis petrovici Brusina, 1893
- Melanopsis dumbeensis Crosse, 1869: synonym of Melanopsis frustulum Morelet, 1857
- Melanopsis elegans Gassies, 1869: synonym of Melanopsis frustulum Morelet, 1857
- Melanopsis elongata Gassies, 1874: synonym of Melanopsis frustulum Morelet, 1857
- Melanopsis esperi Férussac, 1823: synonym of Esperiana esperi (Férussac, 1823)
- Melanopsis fasciata Gassies, 1874: synonym of Melanopsis frustulum Morelet, 1857
- Melanopsis fragilis Gassies, 1874: synonym of Melanopsis frustulum Morelet, 1857
- † Melanopsis fossilis var. accedens Handmann, 1887: synonym of † Melanopsis fossilis (Gmelin, 1791)
- † Melanopsis fossilis var. propinqua Handmann, 1887: synonym of † Melanopsis fossilis (Gmelin, 1791)
- † Melanopsis fossilis var. proclivis Handmann, 1887: synonym of † Melanopsis fossilis (Gmelin, 1791)
- † Melanopsis fossilis rugosa Handmann, 1887: synonym of † Melanopsis wolfgangfischeri Neubauer, Harzhauser, Kroh, Georgopoulou & Mandic, 2014
- Melanopsis fulgurans Gassies, 1859: synonym of Melanopsis frustulum Morelet, 1857
- Melanopsis fulminata Brot, 1879: synonym of Melanopsis frustulum Morelet, 1857
- Melanopsis fusca Gassies, 1870: synonym of Melanopsis frustulum Morelet, 1857
- Melanopsis fusiformis Gassies, 1870: synonym of Melanopsis frustulum Morelet, 1857
- Melanopsis gassiesiana Crosse, 1867: synonym of Melanopsis frustulum Morelet, 1857
- † Melanopsis harpula capreniensis Fontannes, 1887: synonym of † Melanopsis capreniensis Fontannes, 1887
- † Melanopsis impressa bonellii Manzoni, 1870: synonym of † Melanopsis bonellii Manzoni, 1870
- Melanopsis lamberti Souverbie, 1872: synonym of Melanopsis mariei Crosse, 1869
- Melanopsis lentiginosa Reeve, 1860: synonym of Melanopsis frustulum Morelet, 1857
- Melanopsis lineolata Gassies, 1857: synonym of Melanopsis frustulum Morelet, 1857
- Melanopsis lirata Gassies, 1869: synonym of Melanopsis frustulum Morelet, 1857
- Melanopsis livida Gassies, 1863: synonym of Melanopsis frustulum Morelet, 1857
- Melanopsis neritoides Gassies, 1859: synonym of Melanopsis frustulum Morelet, 1857
- Melanopsis retoutiana Gassies, 1863: synonym of Melanopsis frustulum Morelet, 1857
- Melanopsis robusta Gassies, 1870: synonym of Melanopsis frustulum Morelet, 1857
- † Melanopsis rumana var. correcta Stefanescu, 1896: synonym of † Melanopsis correcta Stefanescu, 1896
- † Melanopsis sandbergeri correcta Stefanescu, 1896: synonym of † Melanopsis correcta Stefanescu, 1896
- Melanopsis souverbieana Gassies, 1870: synonym of Melanopsis frustulum Morelet, 1857
- Melanopsis trifasciata Gray, 1843: synonym of Zemelanopsis trifasciata (Gray, 1843)
- Melanopsis variegata Morelet, 1857: synonym of Melanopsis frustulum Morelet, 1857
- Melanopsis zonites Gassies, 1870: synonym of Melanopsis frustulum Morelet, 1857
- † Melanopsis (Canthidomus) bouei var. megacantha Handmann, 1887: synonym of † Melanopsis bouei megacantha Handmann, 1887
- † Melanopsis (Canthidomus) bouei var. monacantha Handmann, 1887: synonym of † Melanopsis bouei bouei Férussac, 1823
- † Melanopsis (Canthidomus) bouei var. multicostata Handmann, 1887: synonym of † Melanopsis bouei multicostata Handmann, 1887
- † Melanopsis (Canthidomus) defensa elongata Gillet & Marinescu, 1971: synonym of † Melanopsis defensa defensa Fuchs, 1870
