= Melanopsis mourebeyensis =

Conservation status
- Endangered (IUCN 3.1)

Scientific classification
- Kingdom: Animalia
- Phylum: Mollusca
- Class: Gastropoda
- Subclass: Caenogastropoda
- Order: incertae sedis
- Family: Melanopsidae
- Genus: Melanopsis
- Species: M. mourebeyensis

Binomial name
- Melanopsis mourebeyensis Pallary, 1901

Species of gastropod

Melanopsis mourebeyensis is a species of small freshwater gastropod endemic to the Oued Oum Rbi (Oued Oum er Rbia), in Morocco. M. mourebeyensis is distinct from other Melanopsis species due to its distinctive nodular carena and inflated body whorl- the shell grows to 20 mm in length. The species occupies the lower section of the river, in which it has an abundant population despite issues with pollution, abstraction and divergence caused by irrigation which disturbs the natural shallow-riverine habitat of melanopsids. It is also vulnerable to the collection of shells. The species is classified as Endangered by the IUCN.
