= Melanopsis letourneuxi =

Conservation status
- Endangered (IUCN 3.1)

Scientific classification
- Kingdom: Animalia
- Phylum: Mollusca
- Class: Gastropoda
- Subclass: Caenogastropoda
- Order: incertae sedis
- Superfamily: Cerithioidea
- Family: Melanopsidae
- Genus: Melanopsis
- Species: M. letourneuxi

Binomial name
- Melanopsis letourneuxi Bourguignat, 1880

Species of gastropod

Melanopsis letourneuxi is a species of freshwater gastropod endemic to streams in coastal Morocco and Algeria.

== Distribution, ecology and threats ==
Melanopsis letourneuxi is found almost exclusively in relatively shallow medium-sized streams with stony substrates, rarely occurring in stagnant sources. The species had historically been reported from several localities in north Africa, including a site in Algeria or (disputedly) Morocco - "in the source and the river Moulouya, west of Maghnia" from which it has not been documented recently- and two confirmed adjacent Moroccan sites -Berguent and Ras el Ain at Aïn Beni Mathar - in which it is exceedingly rare. Remaining populations are threatened by water abstraction, pollution, and shell-collecting.

== Populations ==
Historically, several varieties (excluding the nominal var.) had been identified by Pallary and Bourguignat, including:

- † Melanopsis letourneuxi var. semesa
- Melanopsis letourneuxi var. magna (Berguent at Aïn Beni Mathar)*
- Melanopsis letourneuxi var. minor (Ras el Aïn at Aïn Beni Mathar)*
- Melanopsis letourneuxi var. emaciata (Berguent at Aïn Beni Mathar)
- Melanopsis letourneuxi var. mattarica (Ras el Aïn at Aïn Beni Mathar)

† Denotes that the variety is not mentioned by the nomenclator of Neubauer 2016

*Denotes that the variety is considered invalid by the nomenclator of Neubauer 2016
