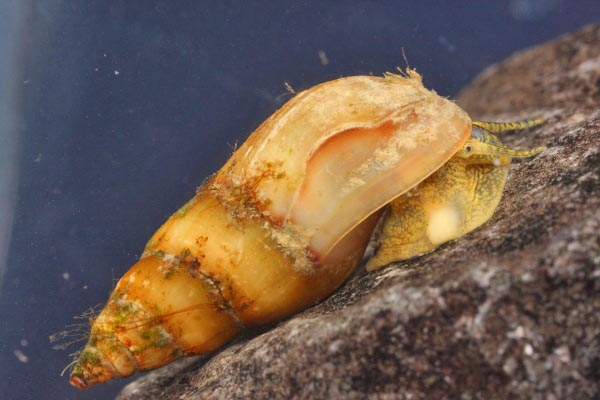

Conservation status
- Least Concern (IUCN 3.1)

Scientific classification
- Kingdom: Animalia
- Phylum: Mollusca
- Class: Gastropoda
- Subclass: Caenogastropoda
- Family: Melanopsidae
- Genus: Microcolpia
- Species: M. daudebartii

Binomial name
- Microcolpia daudebartii (Prevost, 1821)

Synonyms
- Melanopsis daudebartii Prevost, 1821; Esperiana daudebartii (Prevost, 1821); Fagotia daudebartii (Prevost, 1821)

= Microcolpia daudebartii =

Species of gastropod

Microcolpia daudebartii is a species of a freshwater snail in the family Melanopsidae. It is widespread in central and eastern Europe, notably in the Danube drainage. It occurs in rivers and thermal springs.

== Subspecies ==
Subspecies within this species are:

- Microcolpia daudebartii acicularis (A. Férussac, 1823) – Pontic, including Slovakia
- Microcolpia daudebartii daudebartii (Prevost, 1821) – Austria
- Microcolpia daudebartii stussineri (Schütt & Bilgin, 1974) – Greece
- Microcolpia daudebartii thermalis (Brot, 1868) – Hungary

The validity of these subspecies was questioned by Fehér (2010).

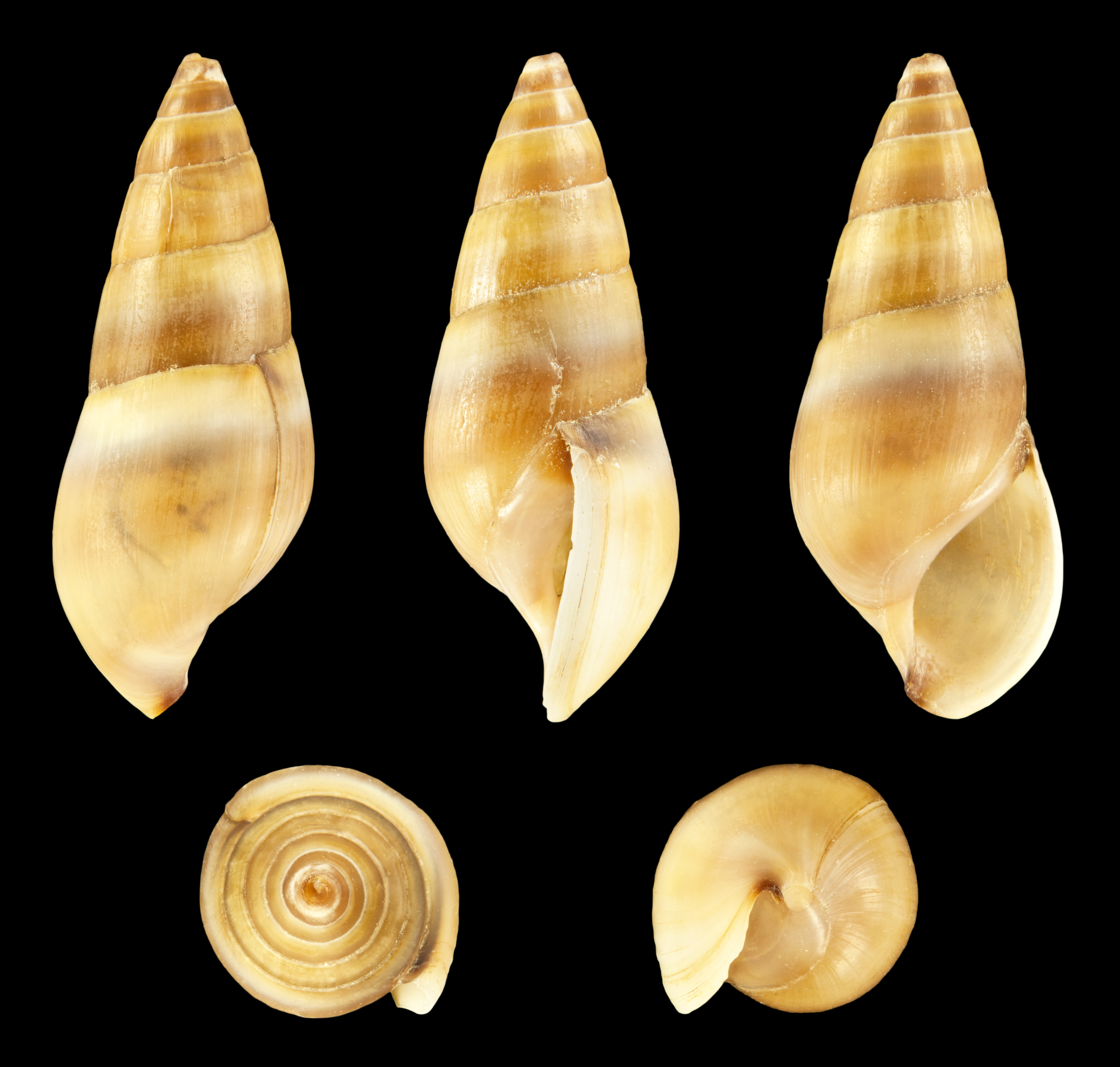
Microcolpia daudebartii acicularis
