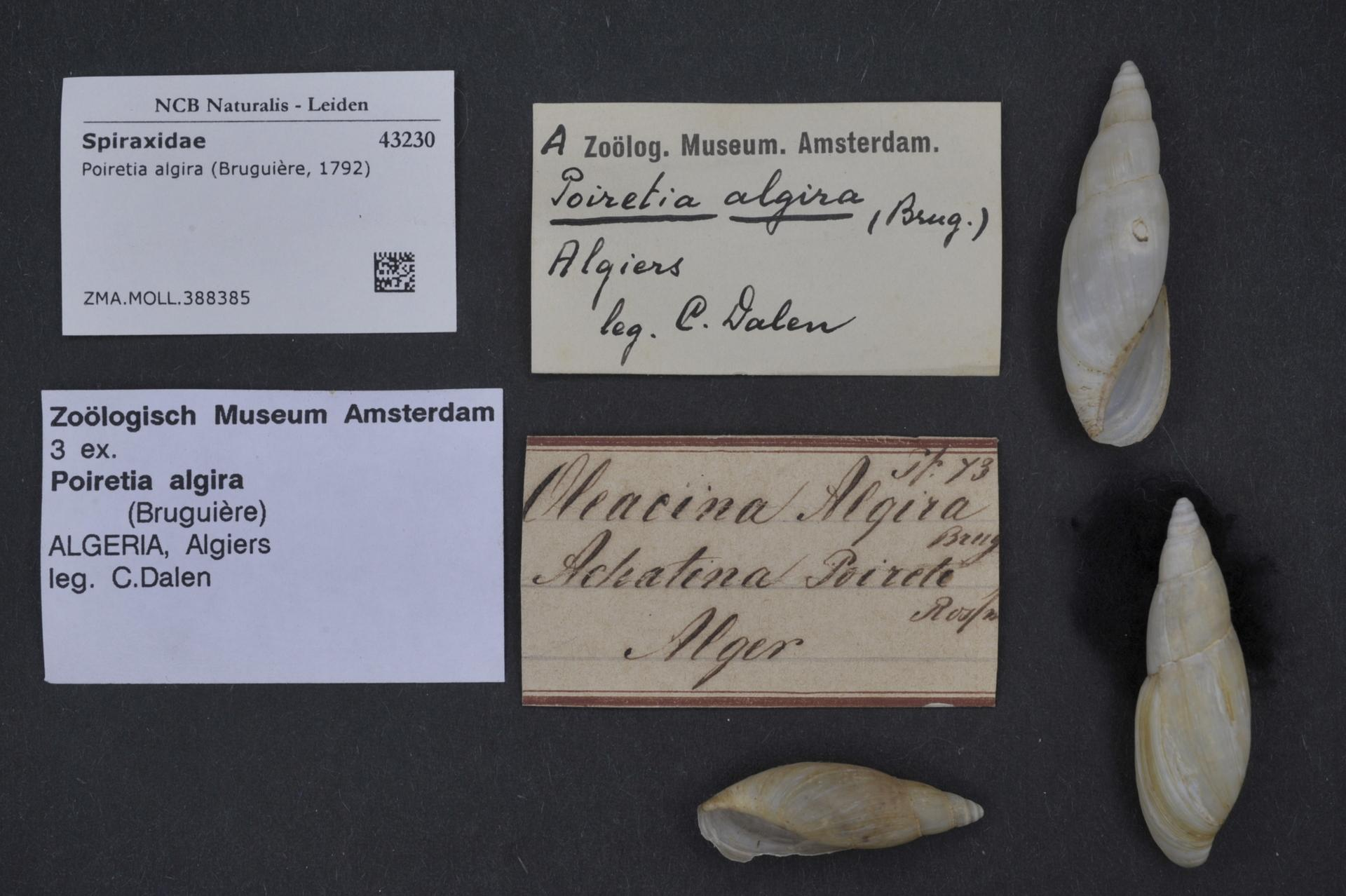

Scientific classification
- Kingdom: Animalia
- Phylum: Mollusca
- Class: Gastropoda
- Order: Stylommatophora
- Family: Spiraxidae
- Genus: Poiretia
- Species: P. algira

Binomial name
- Poiretia algira (Bruguière, 1792)

Synonyms
- Bulimus algirus Bruguière, 1792

= Poiretia algira =

Species of gastropod

Poiretia algira is a species of land snail in the family Spiraxidae.

Poiretia algira is the type species of the genus Poiretia.

== Distribution ==
Distribution of the genus Poiretia include coastal regions of Algeria.
