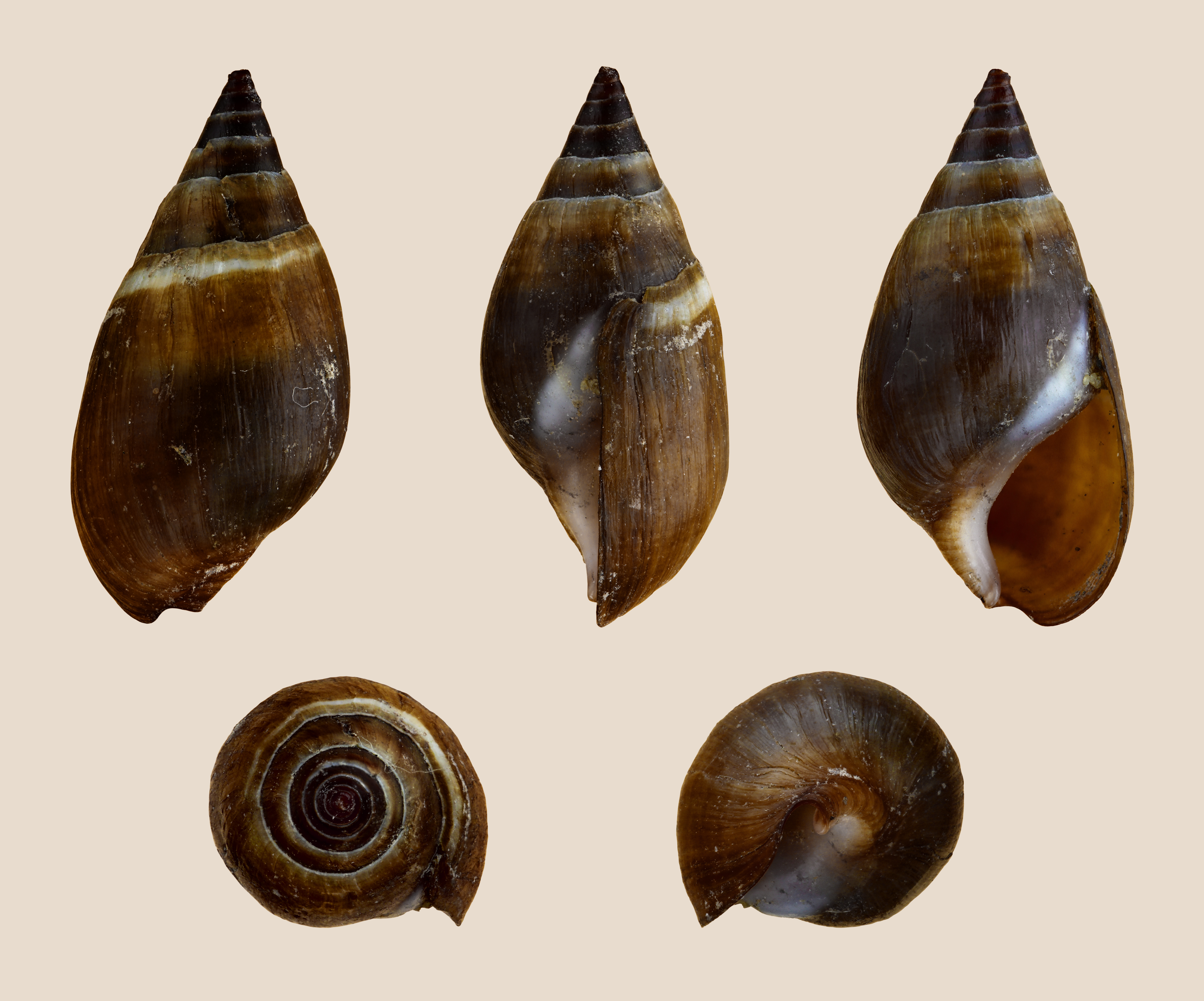
- Five views of a shell of Melanopsis buccinoidea

Conservation status
- Least Concern (IUCN 3.1)

Scientific classification
- Kingdom: Animalia
- Phylum: Mollusca
- Class: Gastropoda
- Subclass: Caenogastropoda
- Order: incertae sedis
- Family: Melanopsidae
- Genus: Melanopsis
- Species: M. buccinoidea

Binomial name
- Melanopsis buccinoidea Olivier, 1801

= Melanopsis buccinoidea =

Species of gastropod

Melanopsis buccinoidea is a species of freshwater snail in the family Melanopsidae. It is native to the Mediterranean Basin, where it occurs in Jordan, Israel, Palestine, Lebanon, Syria, Cyprus, and southern Turkey.

This is a common species that "can occur in huge numbers". It lives in many kinds of freshwater habitat, such as streams, springs, and irrigation ditches.

There are several subspecies.
