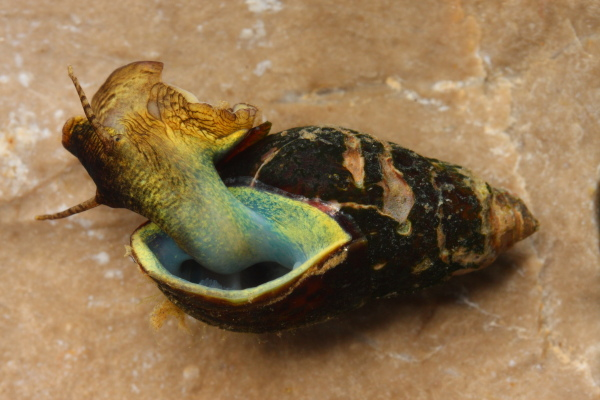
- a live Esperiana esperi out of water

Conservation status
- Least Concern (IUCN 3.1)

Scientific classification
- Kingdom: Animalia
- Phylum: Mollusca
- Class: Gastropoda
- Subclass: Caenogastropoda
- Order: incertae sedis
- Family: Melanopsidae
- Genus: Esperiana
- Species: E. esperi

Binomial name
- Esperiana esperi (Férussac, 1823)

Synonyms
- Melanopsis esperi Férussac, 1823; Fagotia esperi (A. Férussac, 1823)

= Esperiana esperi =

Species of gastropod

Esperiana esperi is a species of freshwater snail with an operculum, an aquatic gastropod mollusk in the family Melanopsidae.

== Distribution ==
Distribution of this species is Pontic.

This species is found in Austria, Belarus, Hungary, Moldova, Slovakia, and Ukraine.

== Description ==
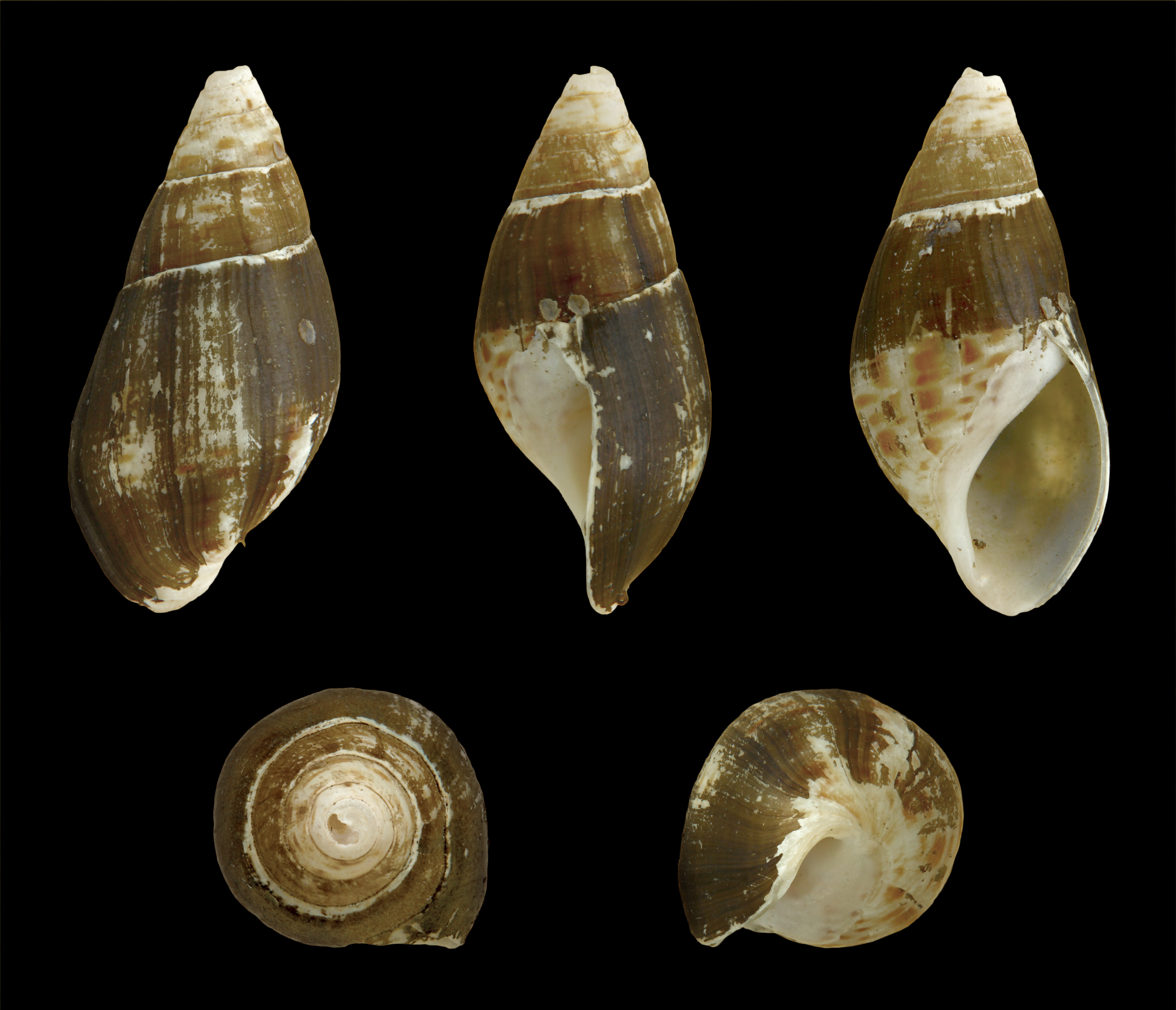
Shell of Esperiana esperi
