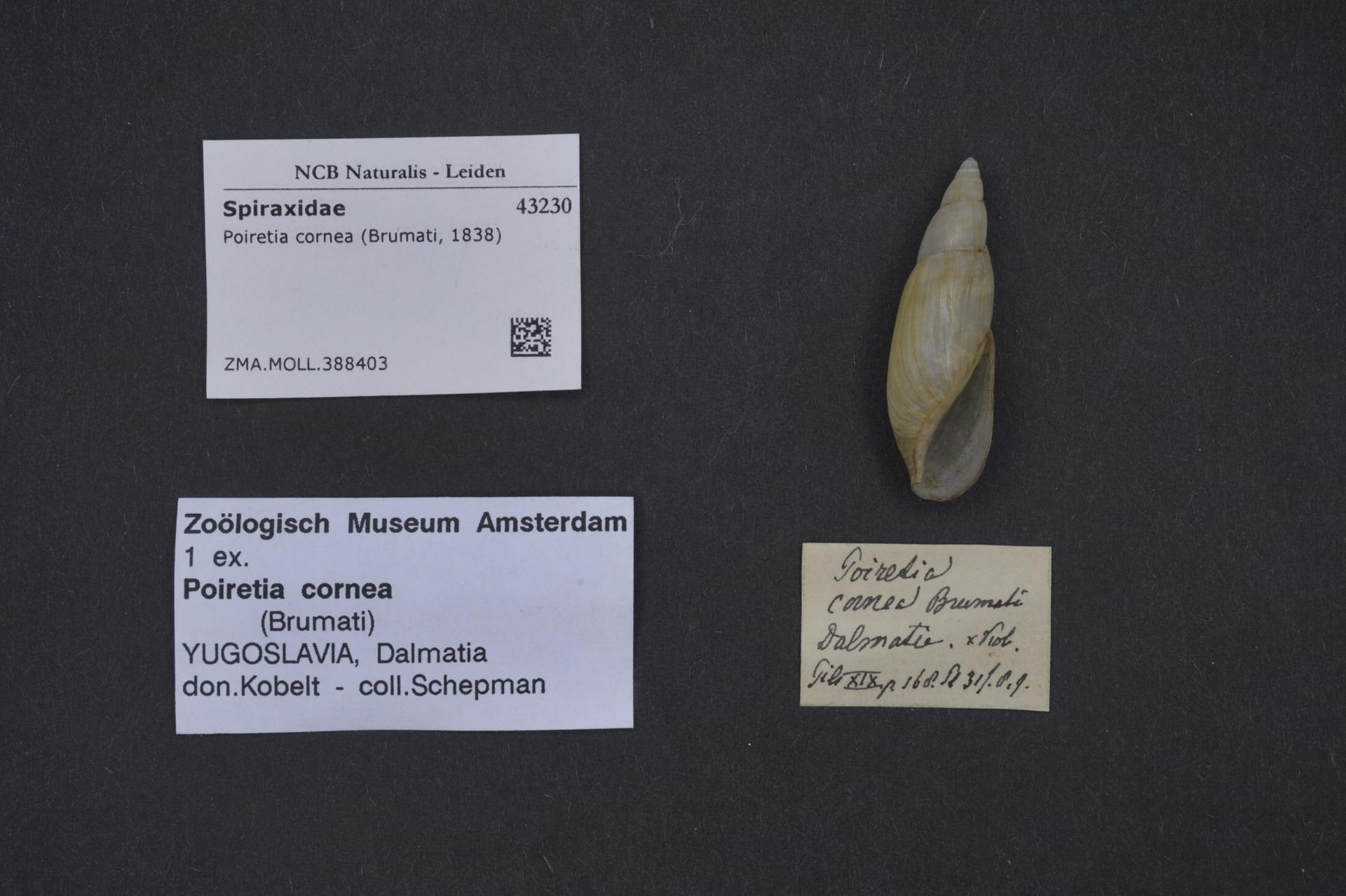
- Poiretia cornea

Scientific classification
- Kingdom: Animalia
- Phylum: Mollusca
- Class: Gastropoda
- Order: Stylommatophora
- Family: Spiraxidae
- Genus: Poiretia; P. Fischer, 1883

= Poiretia (gastropod) =

Genus of gastropods

Poiretia is a genus of predatory air-breathing land snails, terrestrial pulmonate gastropod mollusks in the family Spiraxidae.

== Distribution ==
The distribution of the genus Poiretia is an area from Algeria and Italy to the Caucasus.

== Species ==
Species within the genus Poiretia include:

- Poiretia algira (Bruguière, 1792) – type species
- Poiretia compressa (Mousson, 1859)
- Poiretia cornea (Brumati, 1838)
- Poiretia delesserti (Bourguignat, 1852)
- Poiretia dilatata (Philippi, 1836)
