= Microcolpia =

Scientific classification
- Kingdom: Animalia
- Phylum: Mollusca
- Class: Gastropoda
- Subclass: Caenogastropoda
- Order: incertae sedis
- Family: Melanopsidae
- Genus: Microcolpia; Bourguignat, 1884

Genus of snails

Microcolpia is a genus of gastropods belonging to the family Melanopsidae.

The species of this genus are found in South Europe.

Species:

- Microcolpia canaliculata Bourguignat, 1884
- Microcolpia coutagniana Bourguignat, 1884
- Microcolpia daudebartii (Prevost, 1821)
- Microcolpia friedeli (Brusina, 1885)
- Microcolpia gallandi Bourguignat, 1884
- Microcolpia glinaica Bourguignat, 1884
- Microcolpia hagenmuelleriana Bourguignat, 1884
- Microcolpia inconspicua Starobogatov, 1992
- Microcolpia letourneuxi Bourguignat, 1884
- Microcolpia longa Gozhik, 2007
- Microcolpia mabilliana Bourguignat, 1884
- Microcolpia pachystoma Bourguignat, 1884
- Microcolpia parreyssii (Philippi, 1847)
- Microcolpia peracuta Bourguignat, 1884
- Microcolpia pyramidalis Bourguignat, 1884
- Microcolpia rara Gozhik, 2007
- Microcolpia rochebruniana Bourguignat, 1884
- Microcolpia schileykoi Starobogatov, 1992
- Microcolpia servaini Bourguignat, 1884
- Microcolpia stossichiana Bourguignat, 1884
- Microcolpia ucrainica Starobogatov, Alexenko & Levina, 1992
- †Microcolpia wuesti (Meijer, 1990)
