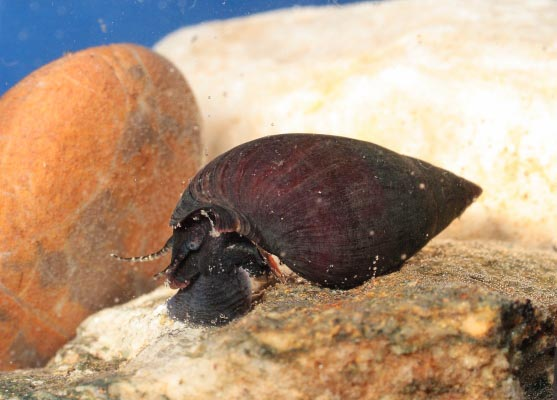
- A live Melanopsis praemorsa

Conservation status
- Least Concern (IUCN 3.1)

Scientific classification
- Kingdom: Animalia
- Phylum: Mollusca
- Class: Gastropoda
- Subclass: Caenogastropoda
- Order: incertae sedis
- Family: Melanopsidae
- Genus: Melanopsis
- Species: M. praemorsa

Binomial name
- Melanopsis praemorsa (Linnaeus, 1758)

Synonyms
- Buccinum praemorsum Linnaeus, 1758

= Melanopsis praemorsa =

Species of gastropod

Melanopsis praemorsa is a species of freshwater snail in the family Melanopsidae. It occurs in southern Europe, North Africa, and the Middle East.

Melanopsis praemorsa shows a high degree of morphological variation, which has made species delimitation contested and led to many synonyms or taxa with uncertain status.

== Subspecies ==
Two subspecies are recognized:

- Melanopsis praemorsa maximalis Schütt & Bilgin, 1974
- Melanopsis praemorsa praemorsa (Linnaeus, 1758)

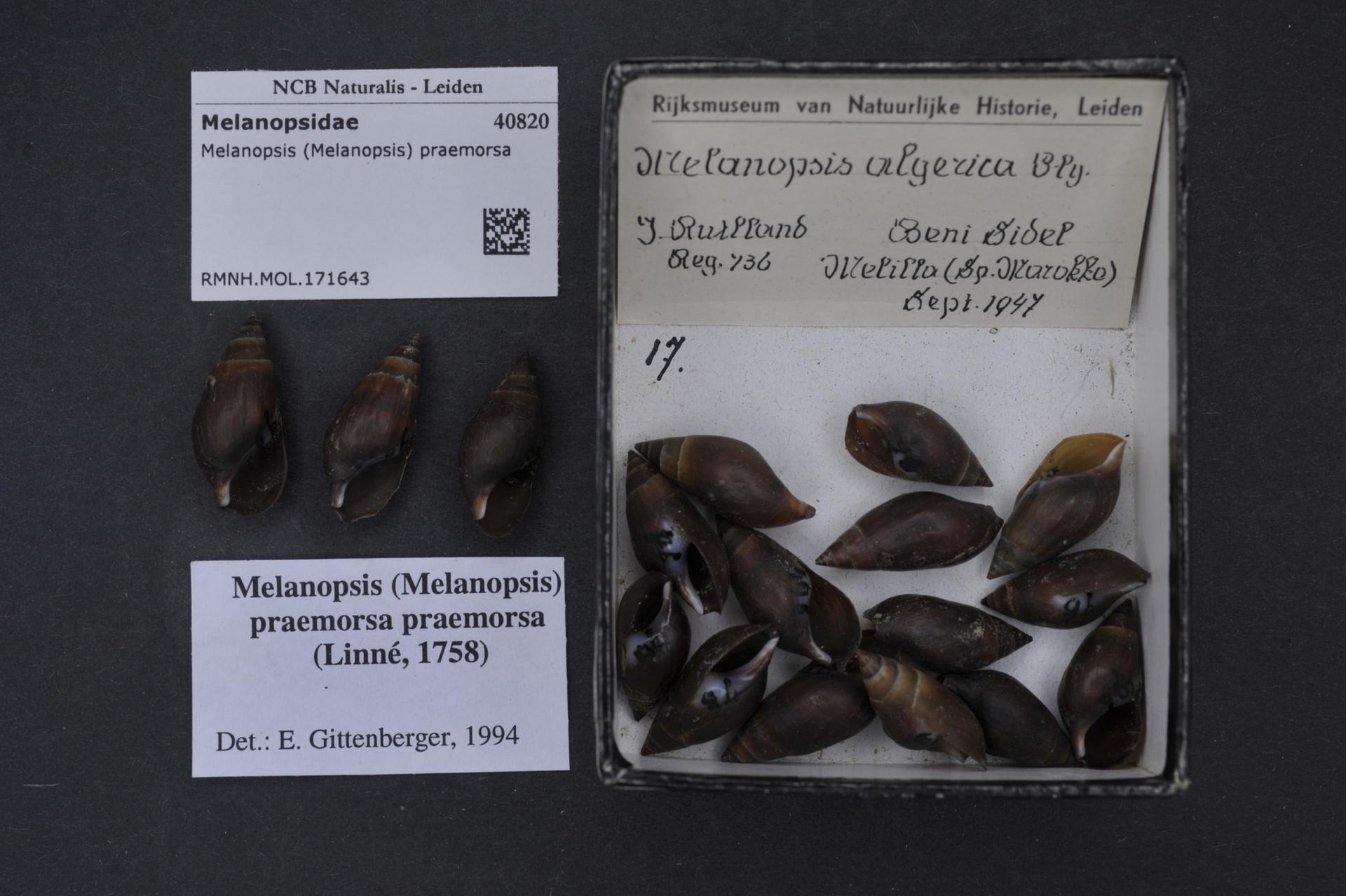
Melanopsis praemorsa shells
