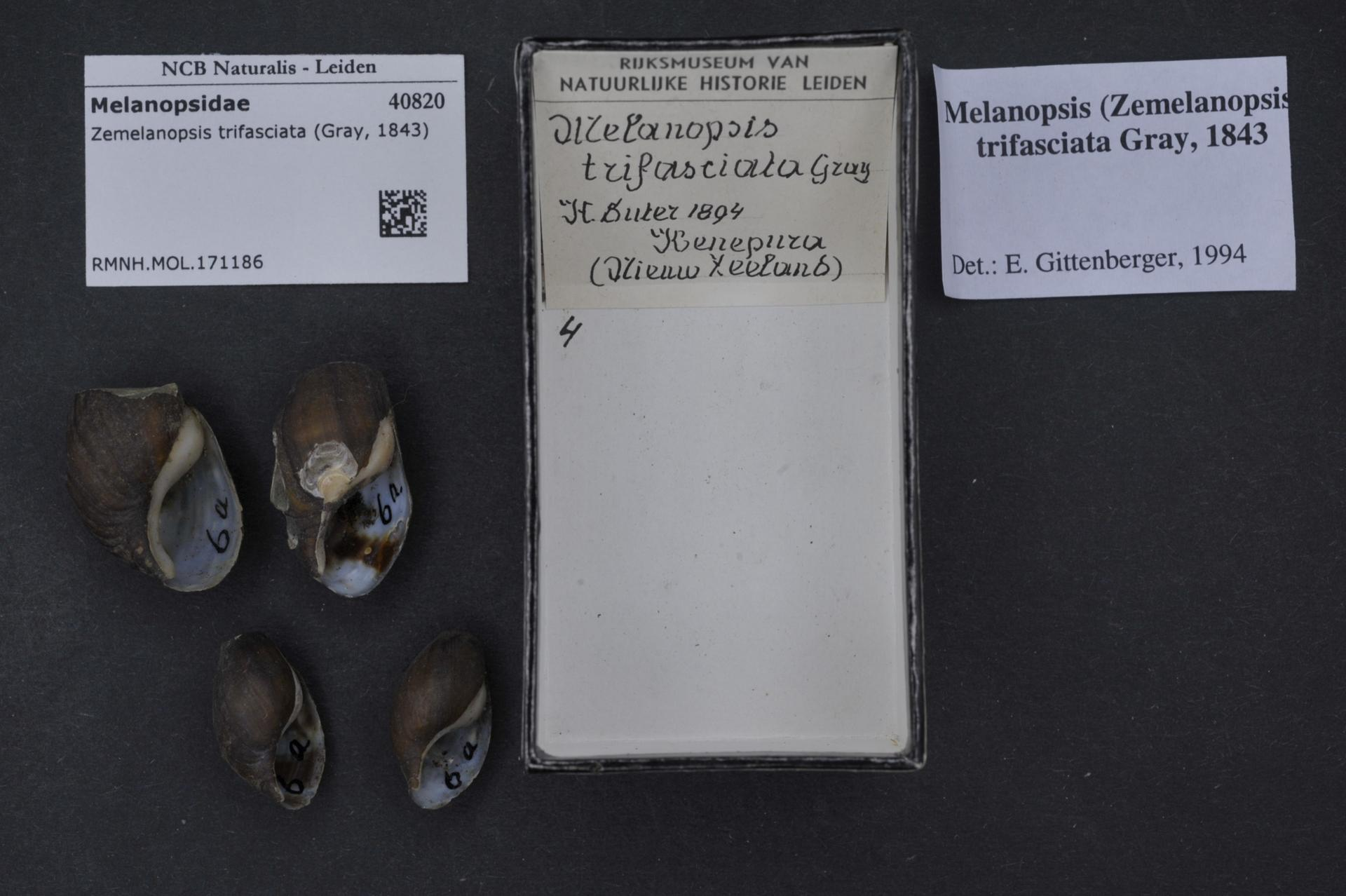
- Shells of Zemelanopsis trifasciata

Conservation status
- Least Concern (IUCN 3.1)

Scientific classification
- Kingdom: Animalia
- Phylum: Mollusca
- Class: Gastropoda
- Subclass: Caenogastropoda
- Family: Melanopsidae
- Genus: Zemelanopsis
- Species: Z. trifasciata

Binomial name
- Zemelanopsis trifasciata (Gray, 1843)

Synonyms
- Melanopsis trifasciatus Gray, 1843 (original combination); Melanopsis trifasciata (Gray, 1843); Melanopsis zelandica Gould, 1843; Melanopsis strangei Reeve, 1860

= Zemelanopsis trifasciata =

Species of gastropod

Zemelanopsis trifasciata is a species of freshwater snail in the family Melanopsidae. It is endemic to New Zealand, where it is found in fresh and brackish water habitat throughout the country.

The type locality is "Waitanga Falls", in Waitangi, Northland, Bay of Islands, New Zealand.

== Description ==
The width of the shell is 11–17 mm. The height of the shell is 18–30 mm.

== Ecology ==
It lives in streams and rivers near their estuaries.
