= Wildlife of Western Sahara =

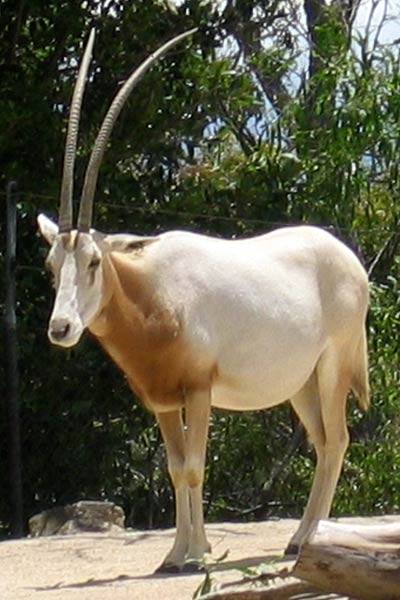
Scimitar oryx

The wildlife of Western Sahara is composed of its flora and fauna. It has around 40 species of mammals and 207 species of birds.
