= Wildlife of Morocco =

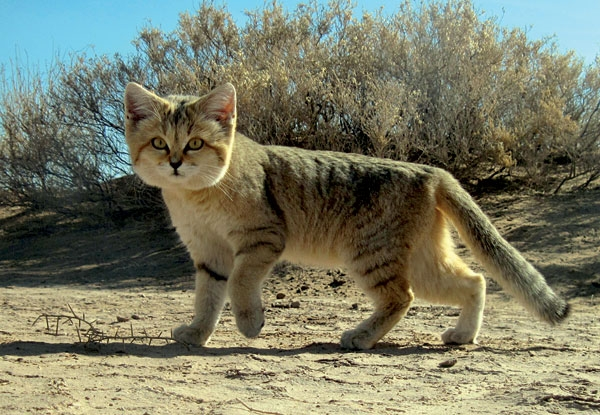
Sand cats live in the desert areas of Morocco

The wildlife of Morocco is composed of its flora and fauna. The country has a wide range of terrains and climate types and a correspondingly large diversity of plants and animals. The coastal areas have a Mediterranean climate and vegetation while inland the Atlas Mountains is forested. Further south, the borders of the Sahara Desert are increasingly arid. Large mammals are not particularly abundant in Morocco, but rodents, bats, and other small mammals are more plentiful. Four hundred and ninety species of birds have been recorded here.

== Geography ==
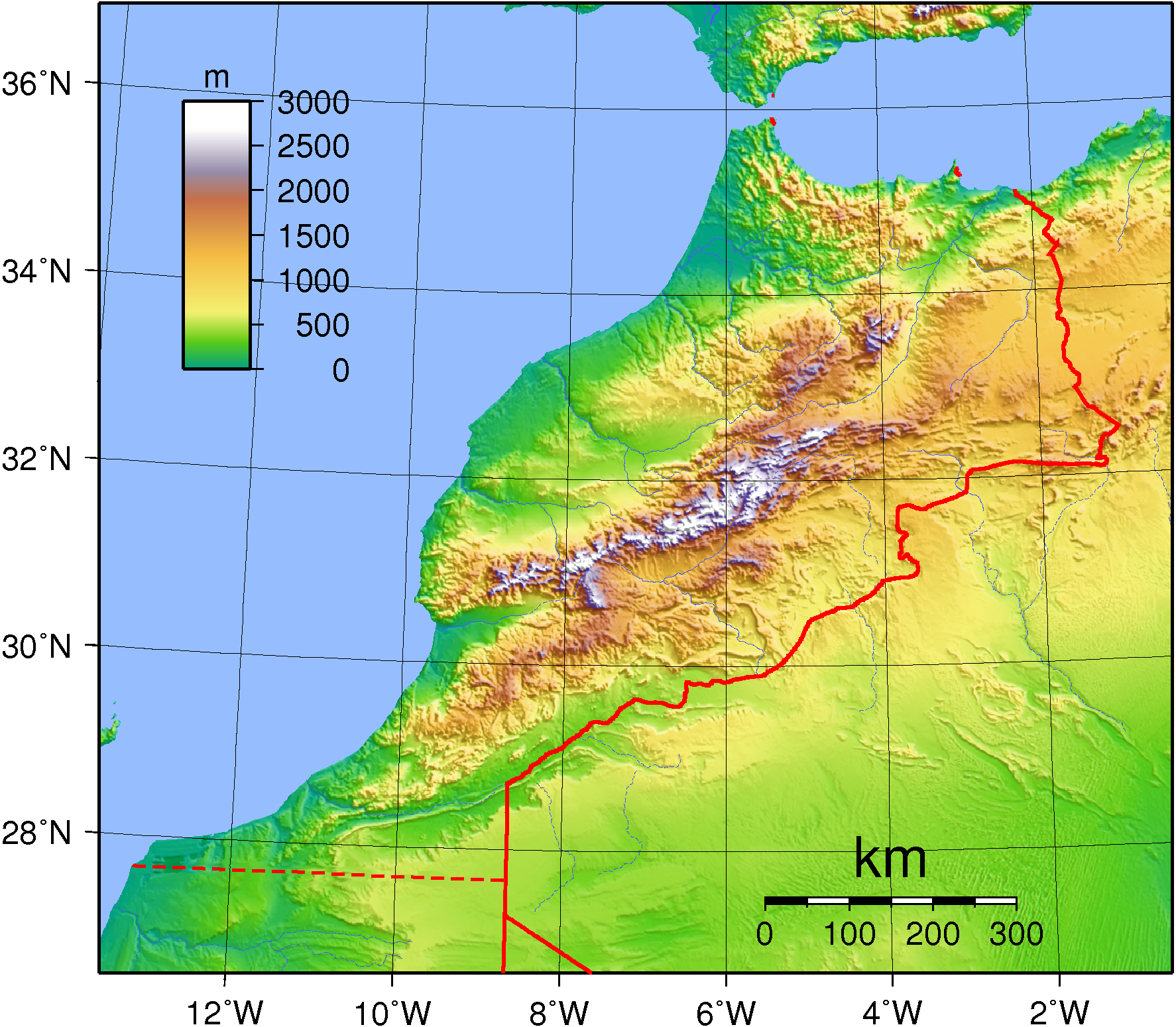
Topography of Morocco

Morocco is a country in northwestern Africa; land borders include Western Sahara in the southwest and Algeria to the south and east. To the north and west, Morocco has a long coastline on the Atlantic Ocean; to the north lies the Strait of Gibraltar and the Mediterranean Sea. It encompasses a wide range of terrain types; there is a coastal plain in the north, and many mountain ranges running from east to west across the country, with the Rif Mountains in the northern half and the Atlas Mountains further south. The southern borders are where the Atlas foothills merge into the edges of the Sahara Desert.

The coastal plain has a Mediterranean climate but is affected by the upwelling cold Canary Current close off-shore; this gives it wet winters and warm summers. The Rif Mountains rise to 2,455 m (8,050 ft) and have mountain ridges cut by gorges and valleys and clad with forests of Atlas cedar, cork oak, holm oak, and Moroccan fir. The climate here is the Mediterranean with up to 2,000 mm (79 in) of precipitation, hot summers and mild winters. The Middle and High Atlas mountains have a more continental climate, with colder winters and hotter summers. At elevations above 1,000 m (3,281 ft), the climate is alpine with warm summers and very cold winters. At these altitudes, the forests give way to alpine meadows, and there are flat-topped summits, terraced cliffs, escarpments and deep gorges.

== Flora ==
At one time Morocco formed a land bridge between Africa and Europe and as a result, the flora is very diverse; it includes about 3,900 species of plant in 981 genera and 155 families. The most important families, together constituting over half of the species richness, are Apiaceae, Asteraceae, Brassicaceae, Caryophyllaceae, Fabaceae, Lamiaceae, Liliaceae and Poaceae. The most diverse genera, each containing more than 40 species, are Silene, with about 70 species, followed by Centaurea, Ononis, Teucrium, Euphorbia, Trifolium and Linaria.

More than 20% of the vascular plants in the country (some 607 species) are endemic to Morocco. Of these, the genera Silene and Teucrium each contain over 25 endemic species. Other genera with large numbers of endemic taxa are Ononis, Centaurea, Fumaria, Rhodanthemum, Linaria, Thymus, Astragalus, Bupleurum and Limonium.

The coastal plains and lowlands support a Mediterranean-type community of plants. These areas are heavily cultivated, producing crops of grain, vegetables and fruit. Olives flourish here and there are extensive orchards, and in places, large plantations of non-native eucalyptus transform the landscape.

The central zone with the main ranges of the Atlas Mountains is covered by cedar forest. Prunus amygdalus is grown in the valleys. Present in the subalpine grassland zone are Acantholimon, Astragalus and Onobrychis, many endemic species and plentiful Vicia canescens.

The southern zone of the country consists of the Little Atlas Mountains and the semi-arid and arid fringes of the Sahara Desert. Here the plants are adapted for the harsh environment with scrub and bushes growing in a sandy habitat. Species present include Tamarix, Retama retam, Ziziphus and Pistacia atlantica. Oases occur wherever water is found near the surface.

== Fauna ==
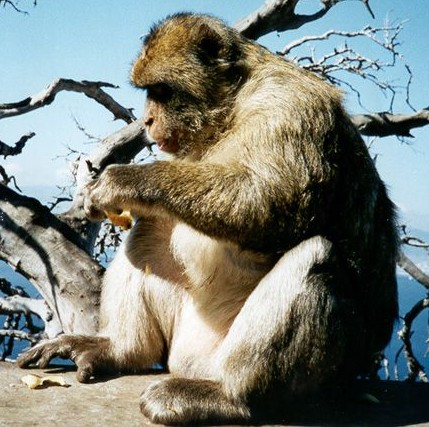
Barbary macaque

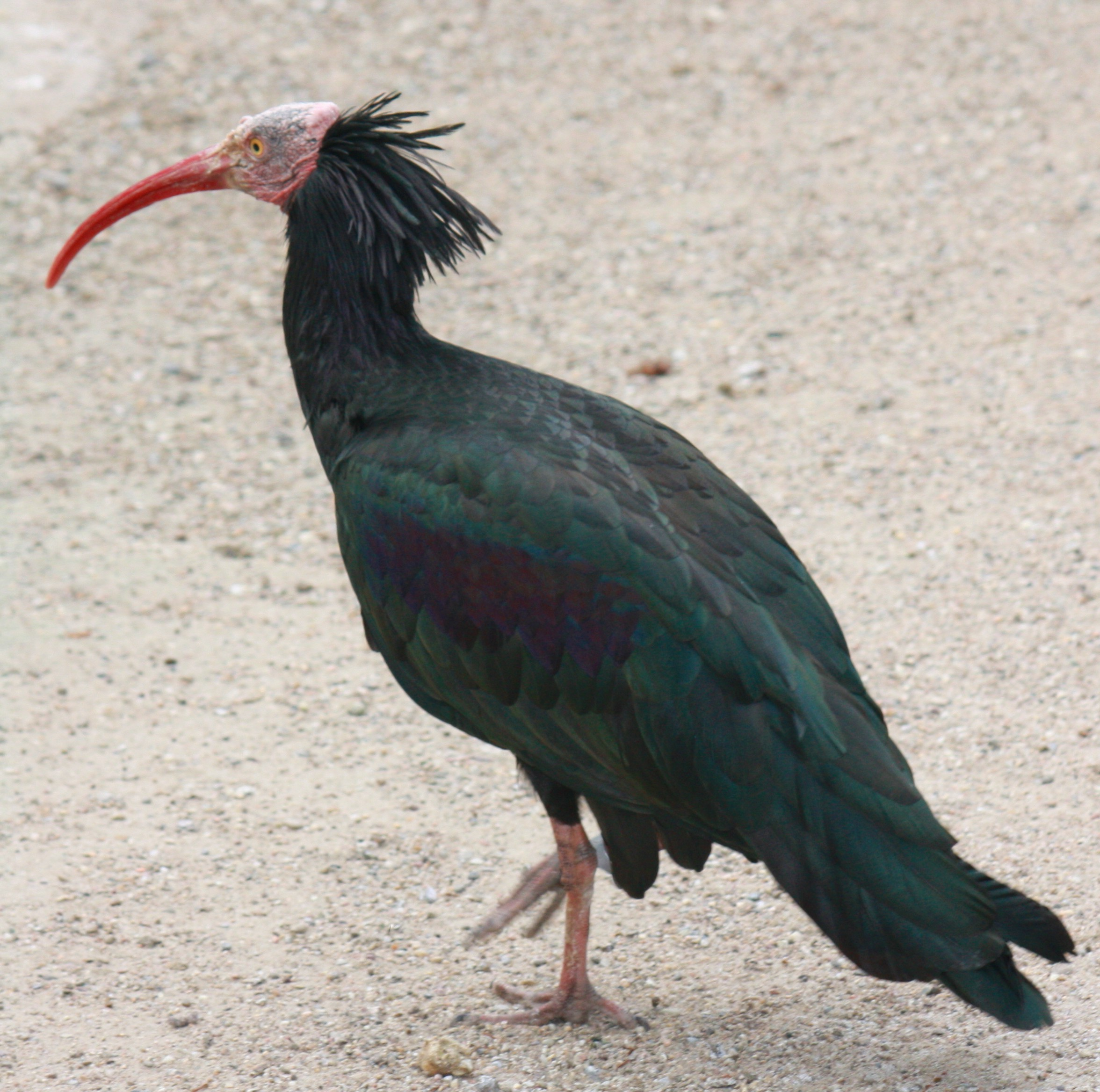
Northern bald ibis, Morocco's only endemic bird species

One of the best-known mammals of Morocco is the Barbary macaque, the only monkey in Africa to be found north of the Sahara. It is found in the forests and more remote parts of the Rif, Middle, and High Atlas, as well as on the Rock of Gibraltar in extreme Southern Europe. Their numbers are declining in Morocco as their habitat is reduced by logging, clearing for crops and overgrazing.

Other large mammals include the Cuvier's gazelle, Barbary sheep and wild boar, but they are not plentiful. Carnivores include the fennec fox, least weasel, Saharan striped polecat, Egyptian mongoose, striped hyena and Mediterranean monk seal; wild cats include the caracal, wildcat and sand cat. Smaller mammals include cape hares, crested porcupines, ground squirrels, gerbils, jirds, jerboas, rats and mice. There are over twenty species of bat, and a dozen species of whales and dolphins. Morocco is rich in reptiles, with over ninety species being recorded here. These include small snakes, Moorish wall geckos and the Iberian wall lizards. Amphibians include Berber toads and Mediterranean painted frogs.

A migratory route for birds, linking Western Europe with North Africa, passes across the Strait of Gibraltar and through Morocco. 490 species of bird have been recorded in the country, many of them in passage or winter visitors. A single endemic bird species, the northern bald ibis (Geronticus eremita) occurs here, and there are about 11 globally endangered species; the white-headed duck (Oxyura leucocephala), the Balearic shearwater (Puffinus mauretanicus), the northern bald ibis, the Egyptian vulture (Neophron percnopterus), the lappet-faced vulture (Torgos tracheliotos), the hooded vulture (Necrosyrtes monachus), the white-backed vulture (Gyps africanus), the Rüppell's vulture (Gyps rueppelli), the sociable lapwing (Vanellus gregarius), the great knot (Calidris tenuirostris) and the saker falcon (Falco cherrug). Other birds with restricted ranges in north Africa include the Levaillant's woodpecker (Picus vaillantii), the Moussier's redstart (Phoenicurus moussieri) and the Tristram's warbler (Sylvia deserticola).
