= Agourai =

Agourai أكوراي ⴰⴳⵓⵔⴰⵢ
- Town
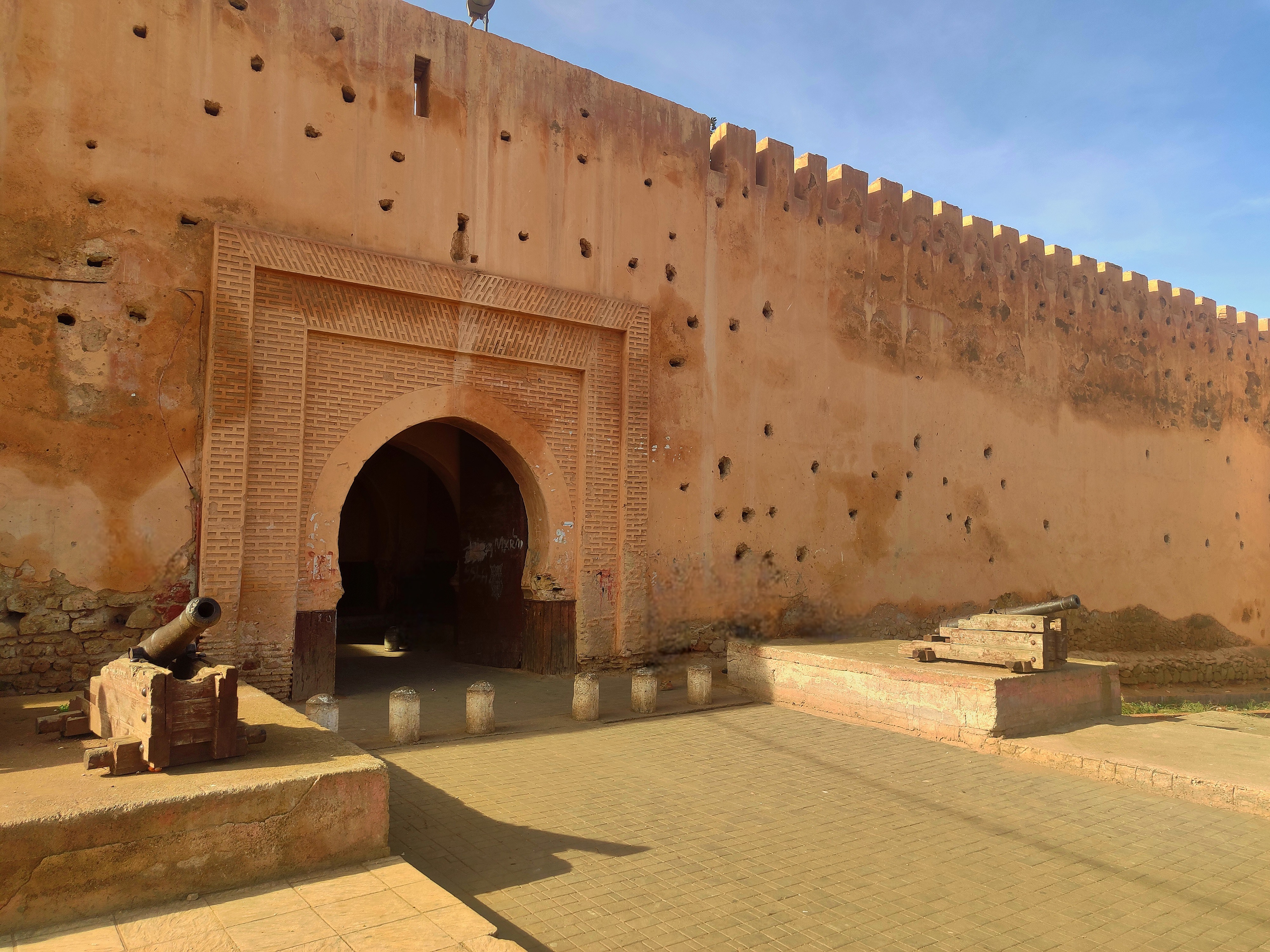
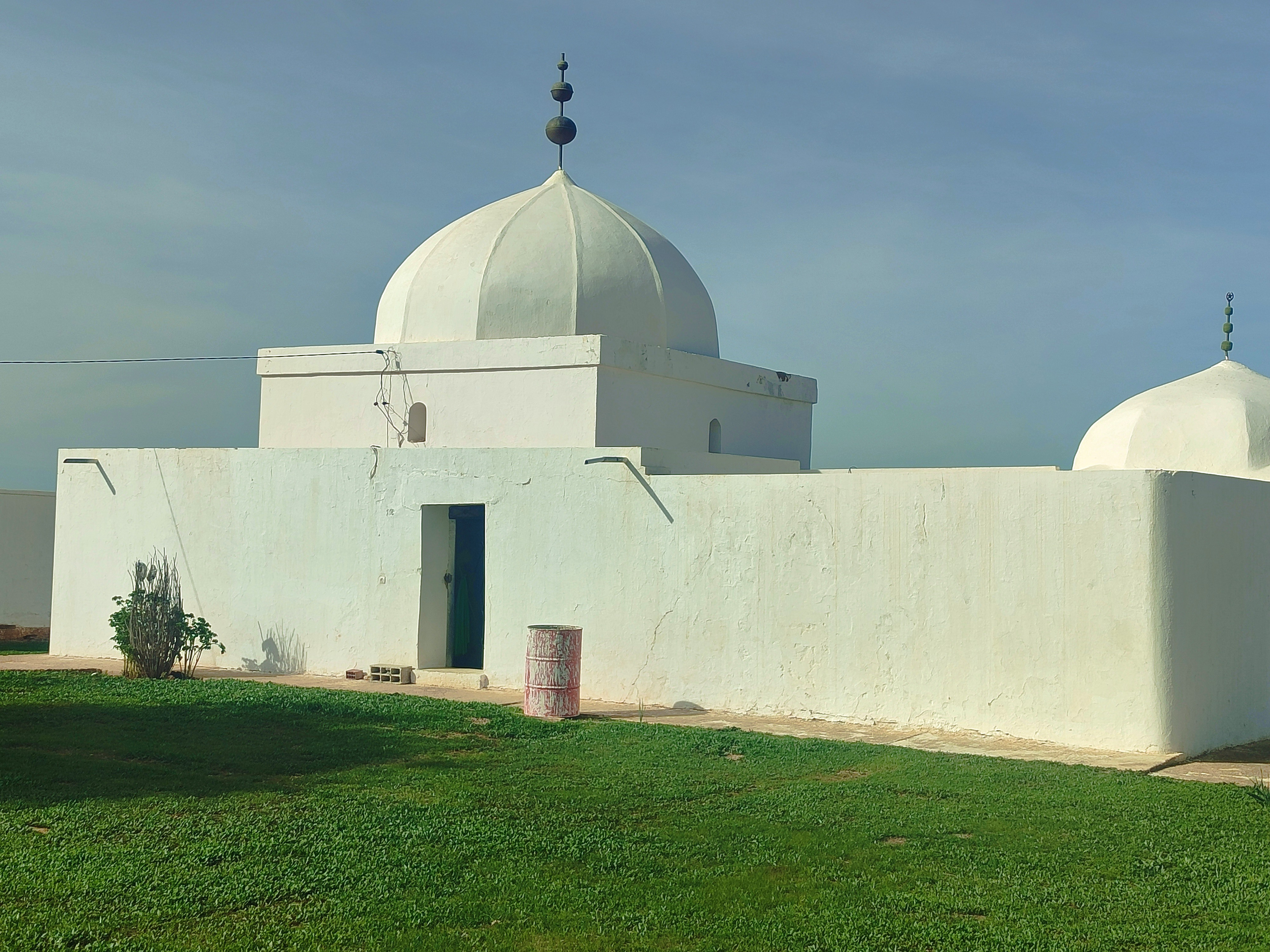
- Nickname: Grwawa
- Interactive map of Agourai
- Coordinates: 33°38′N 5°35′W
- Country: Morocco
- Region: Fez-Meknes
- Province: El Hajeb
- Elevation: 3,054 ft (931 m)

Population (2014)
  - Total: 16,291
- Time zone: UTC+0 (GMT)
- Postal code: 51050

Agourai (Arabic: أكوراي, Standard Moroccan Tamazight: ⴰⴳⵓⵔⴰⵢ, pronounced [ʔakuːraːj]) is a town in El Hajeb Province, Fez-Meknes, Morocco. According to the 2014 census, it has a population of 16,291.

The town gets its name from the Guerrouane tribe that inhabits it.
