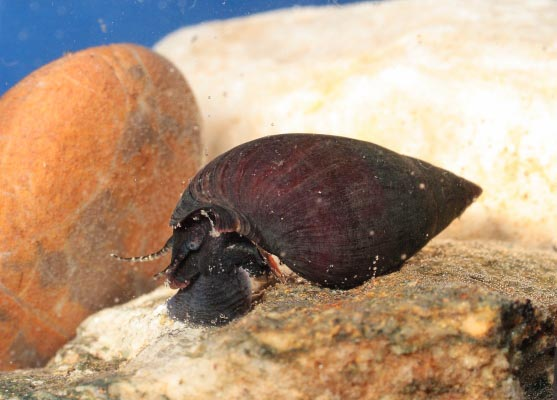
- A live Melanopsis praemorsa
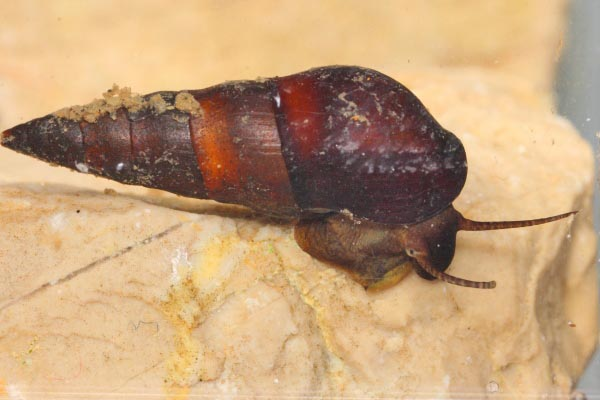
- A live Esperiana daudebartii thermalis

Scientific classification
- Kingdom: Animalia
- Phylum: Mollusca
- Class: Gastropoda
- Subclass: Caenogastropoda
- Order: incertae sedis
- Superfamily: Cerithioidea
- Family: Melanopsidae; H. Adams & A. Adams, 1854

Diversity
- about 25-50 extant freshwater species, several hundreds of fossil species and subspecies

Synonyms
- Stomatopsinae Stache, 1889; Amphimelaniinae P. Fischer & Crosse, 1891; Fagotiinae Starobogatov, 1992

= Melanopsidae =

Melanopsidae Temporal range: 90–recent Ma

Family of gastropods

Melanopsidae, common name melanopsids, is a family of freshwater gastropods in the clade Sorbeoconcha. Species in this family are native to southern and eastern Europe, northern Africa, parts of the Middle East, New Zealand, and freshwater streams of some large South Pacific islands.

These snails first appeared in the Late Cretaceous and are closely related to Potamididae. As well as unidirectional evolutionary change from one species to the next over time, the process of hybridization plays a major role in the appearance of new Melanopsidae species.

According to the taxonomy of the Gastropoda by Bouchet & Rocroi (2005) the family Melanopsidae has no subfamilies.

== Genera ==
Genera in the family Melanopsidae include:

- Esperiana Bourguignat, 1877 - synonym: Fagotia Bourguignat, 1884
- Holandriana Bourguignat, 1884 - synonym: Amphimelania P. Fischer, 1885
  - Holandriana holandrii (C. Pfeiffer, 1828) or Amphimelania holandrii (C. Pfeiffer, 1828)
- † Megalonoda Kollmann, 1984
- Melanopsis Férussac, 1807 - type genus of the family Melanopsidae
- Microcolpia Bourguignat, 1884
- † Pseudobellardia Cox, 1931
- † Pseudofagotia Anistratenko, 1993
- † Stomatopsis Stache, 1871
- † Stilospirula Rovereto, 1899 - synonyms: Stylospirula Rovereto, 1899
- † Turripontica Anistratenko, 1993
- Zemelanopsis Finlay, 1927
  - Zemelanopsis trifasciata (Gray, 1843)
