= Gibbus =

Scientific classification
- Kingdom: Animalia
- Phylum: Mollusca
- Class: Gastropoda
- Order: Stylommatophora
- Family: Streptaxidae
- Subfamily: Orthogibbinae
- Genus: †Gibbus; Montfort, 1810

Synonyms
- Gibbus (Gibbulina) Beck, 1837; Pupa (Gibbus) Montfort, 1810

Extinct genus of gastropods

Gibbus is an extinct genus of air-breathing land snails, terrestrial pulmonate gastropod molluscs in the family Streptaxidae.

== Distribution ==
The genus Gibbus was endemic to Mauritius and it is now extinct.

== Species ==
Species within the genus Gibbus include:

- †Gibbus lyonetianus Pallas, 1780

Taxa inquirenda

- Gibbus antoni L. Pfeiffer, 1847
- Gibbus confusa Preston, 1909
- Gibbus obtusus L. Pfeiffer, 1850

Species brought into synonymy

- Gibbus alluaudi: synonym of Edentulina minor
- Gibbus anodon: synonym of Edentulina anodon
- Gibbus bacillus: synonym of Gonospira bacillus
- Gibbus barclayi: synonym of Gonospira barclayi (basionym)
- Gibbus bourguignati: synonym of Gonospira bourguignati
- Gibbus breviculus: synonym of Gonaxis breviculus
- Gibbus callifer: synonym of Gonospira callifera
- Gibbus clavulus: synonym of Gonospira striaticosta
- Gibbus cylindrella: synonym of Gonospira cylindrella
- Gibbus cylindrellus: synonym of Gonospira cylindrella
- Gibbus deshayesi: synonym of Gonospira deshayesi
- Gibbus dupontiana: synonym of Gonospira dupontiana
- Gibbus dupontianus: synonym of Gonospira dupontiana
- Gibbus dussumieri: synonym of Edentulina dussumieri
- Gibbus holostoma: synonym of Gonospira holostoma
- Gibbus intersecta: synonym of Gonospira bourguignati
- Gibbus insignis: synonym of Edentulina insignis
- Gibbus johnstoni: synonym of Edentulina johnstoni (basionym)
- Gibbus liberianus: synonym of Edentulina liberiana
- Gibbus lyoneti: synonym of Gibbus lyonetianus
- Gibbus martensi: synonym of Edentulina martensi
- Gibbus moreleti: synonym of Edentulina moreleti
- Gibbus mauritianus: synonym of Gonospira mauritiana
- Gibbus modiolus: synonym of Gonospira modiola
- Gibbus mondraini: synonym of Gonospira mondraini (basionym)
- Gibbus moreleti: synonym of Edentulina moreleti
- Gibbus nevilli: synonym of Gonospira nevilli (basionym)
- Gibbus newtoni: synonym of Plicadomus newtoni (basionym)
- Gibbus nitens: synonym of Edentulina nitens
- Gibbus palanga: synonym of Gonospira palanga (nomen dubium)
- Gibbus productus: synonym of Gonospira producta
- Gibbus raffrayi: synonym of Gonospira raffrayi
- Gibbus striaticosta: synonym of Gonospira striaticosta
- Gibbus sulcatus: synonym of Plicadomus sulcata
- Gibbus teres: synonym of Gonospira teres
- Gibbus turgidulus: synonym of Gonospira turgidula
- Gibbus uvula: synonym of Gonospira uvula
- Gibbus versipolis: synonym of Gonospira versipolis
