= List of non-marine molluscs of Réunion =

Location of Réunion

The non-marine molluscs of Réunion are a part of the molluscan wildlife of Réunion, an island in the Indian Ocean.

== Freshwater gastropods ==
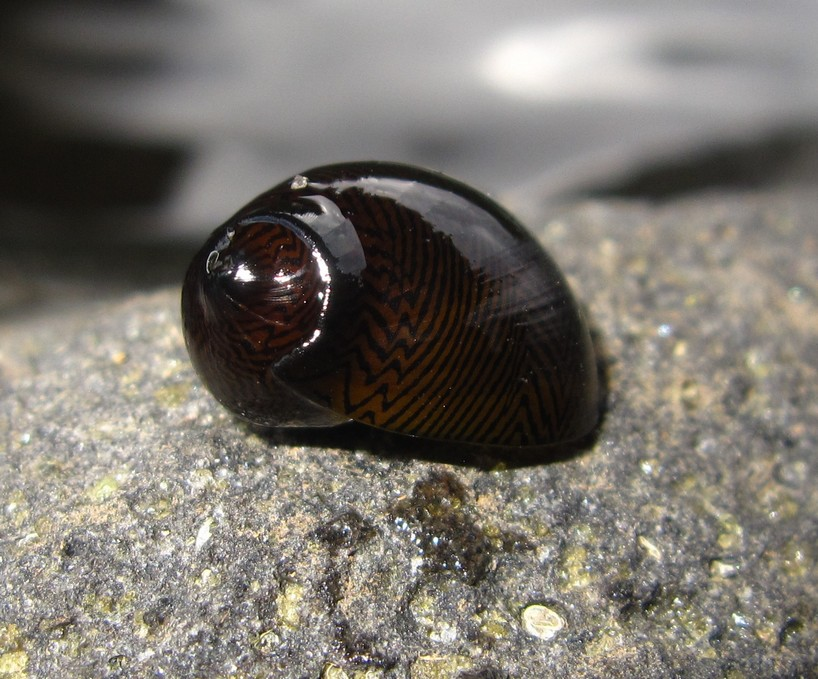
Neritina gagates

Ampullariidae

- Pomacea canaliculata (Lamarck, 1819)

Assimineidae

- Paludinella hidalgoi (Gassies, 1869)

Lymnaeidae

- Lymnaea natalensis Krauss, 1848
- Lantzia carinata – synonym Erinna carinata – endemic

Neritidae

- Clithon coronatus (Leach, 1815)
- Neripteron bensoni (Récluz, 1850)
- Neripteron simoni Prashad, 1921
- Neritilia rubida (Pease, 1865) – synonym: Neritilia consimilis (Martens, 1879)
- Neritina gagates (Lamarck, 1822)
- Septaria borbonica (Bory de Saint-Vincent, 1803)

Physidae

- Physa acuta (Drapanaud, 1805)

Planorbidae

- Bulimus cernicus (Morelet, 1875)
- Gyraulus mauritianus (Morelet, 1876)
- Helisoma duryi (Waterby, 1879)

Thiaridae

- Melanoides tuberculata (Müller, 1774)
- Thiara amarula (Linnaeus, 1758)
- Thiara scabra (Müller, 1774)

Viviparidae

- Bellamya bengalenbsis (Lamarck, 1822)

== Land gastropods ==
Charopidae

- †Pilula praetumida – endemic – extinct
- Pilula cordemoyi (Nevill, 1870) – endemic

Cyclophoridae

- Madgeaconcha gerlachi – endemic – described 2004

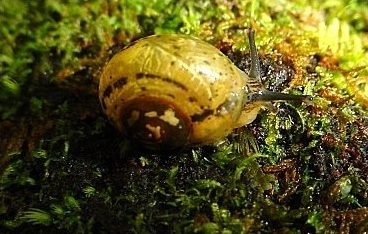
Plegma caelatura

Euconulidae

- Caldwellia imperfecta
- Ctenophila salaziensis – endemic
- Ctenophila setiliris – endemic
- Ctenophila vorticella – endemic
- Plegma caelatura – endemic

Helicarionidae

- Dupontia maillardi – (Deshayes, 1863) – endemic
- †Dupontia proletaria – (Morelet, 1860) – extinct
- Erepta setiliris – (Benson, 1859) – endemic
- Harmogenanina argentea – (Reeve, 1852) – endemic
- Harmogenanina linophora – extinct
- †Harmogenanina subdetecta – (de Férussac, 1827)- endemic – extinct

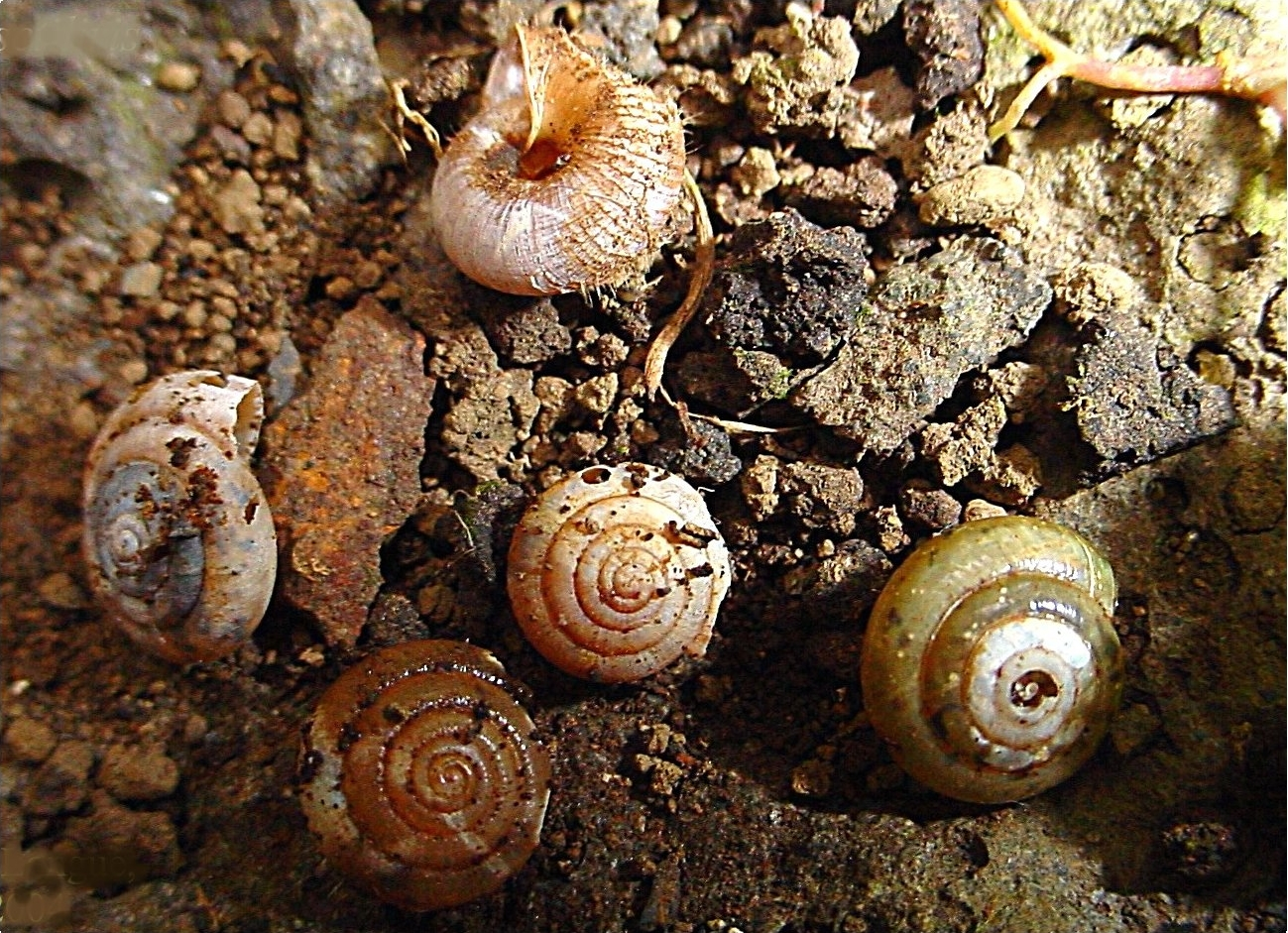
Erepta setiliris

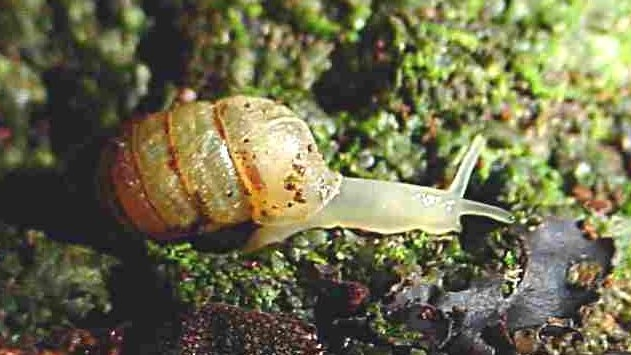
Gonospira uvula

Streptaxidae

- Gonospira bourguignati – endemic
- Gonospira cylindrella – endemic
- Gonospira deshayesi – (Adams, 1868) – endemic
- Gonospira funicula – endemic
- Gonospira turgidula – endemic
- Gonospira uvula – (Deshayes, 1863) – endemic
- Gonospira versipolis – (Deshayes, 1851) – endemic
- Gulella antelmeana – (Peile, 1936) – endemic to Mauritius & Réunion

Succineidae

- Hyalimax maillardi Fischer, 1867 (endemic)
- Quickia concisa (Morelet, 1849)

Vertiginidae

- Nesopupa incerta – (Nevill, 1870) – endemic
- Nesopupa madgei – (Peile, 1936) – subendemic
- Nesopupa micra – (Pilsbry, 1920) – subendemic
- Nesopupa morini – (Madge, 1938) – subendemic

== Freshwater bivalves ==
Unionidae

- †Unio cariei (Nodularia cariei) – (Germain, 1919) – endemic – extinct

== See also ==
- List of marine molluscs of Réunion
- List of non-marine molluscs of Mauritius
- List of non-marine molluscs of Madagascar
