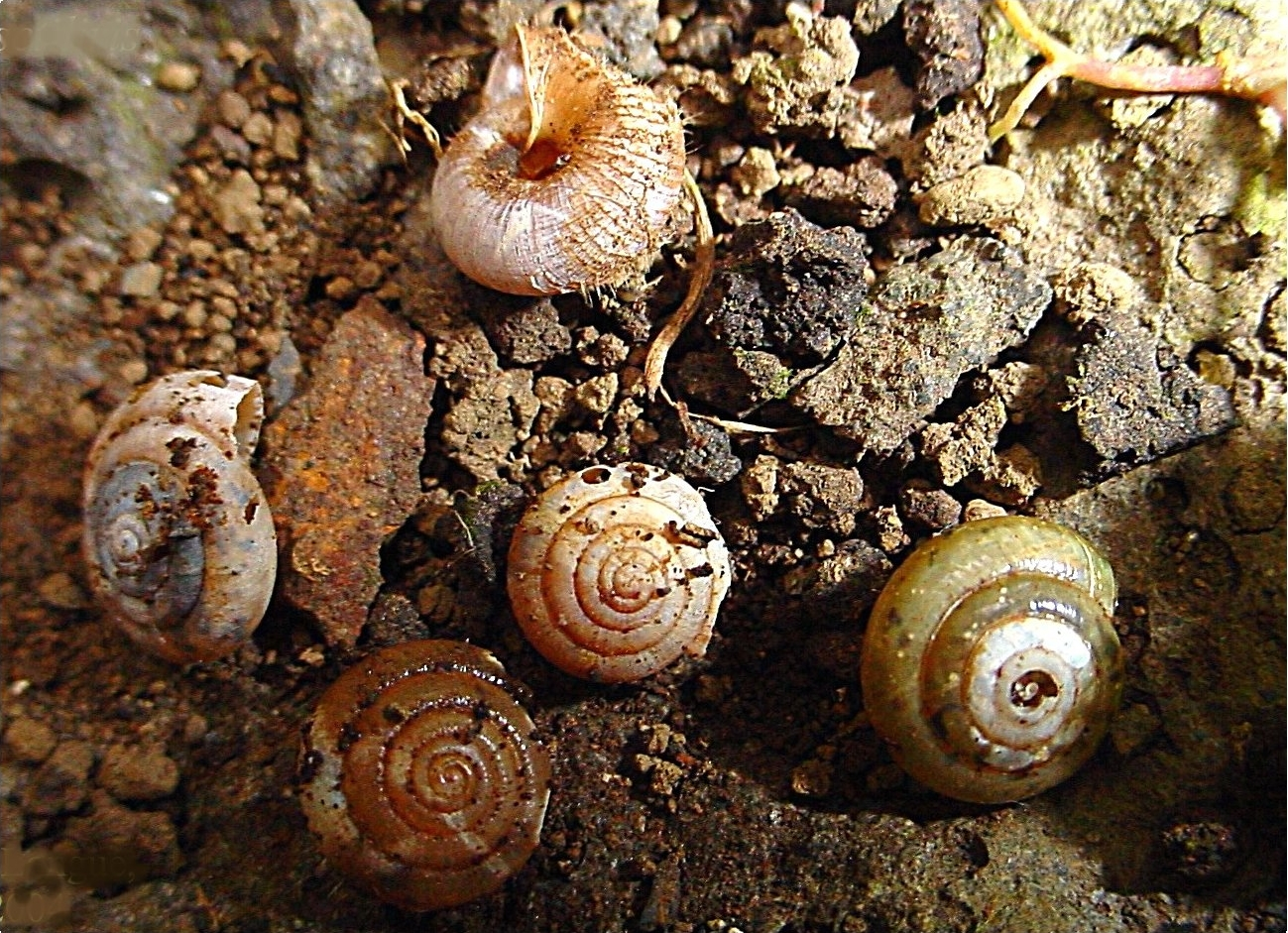
- Five empty shells of Erepta setiliris on Reunion Island

Scientific classification
- Kingdom: Animalia
- Phylum: Mollusca
- Class: Gastropoda
- Order: Stylommatophora
- Family: Helicarionidae
- Genus: Erepta (Albers, 1850)

Synonyms
- Helix (Erepta) Albers, 1850 · unaccepted (original rank); Microstylodonta Germain, 1921 · unaccepted; Stylodon Albers, 1850 · unaccepted > superseded rank; Stylodonta (Erepta) Albers, 1850 · unaccepted

= Erepta =

Genus of gastropods

Erepta is a genus of air-breathing land snails, a terrestrial pulmonate gastropod mollusks in the family Helicarionidae.

== Species ==
Species in the genus Erepta include:

- Erepta chloritiformis Griffiths & Florens, 2004
- Erepta odontina (Morelet, 1851)
- Erepta pyramidalis Griffiths & Florens, 2004
- Erepta setiliris (Benson, 1859)
- Erepta stylodon (Pfeiffer, 1842)
- Erepta thiriouxi (Germain, 1918)
- Erepta wendystrahmi Grifiths, 2000

Species brought into synonymy

- Erepta caldwelli: synonym of Ctenophila caldwelli
- Erepta levis: synonym of Dupontia levis
- Erepta perlucida: synonym of Dupontia perlucida
