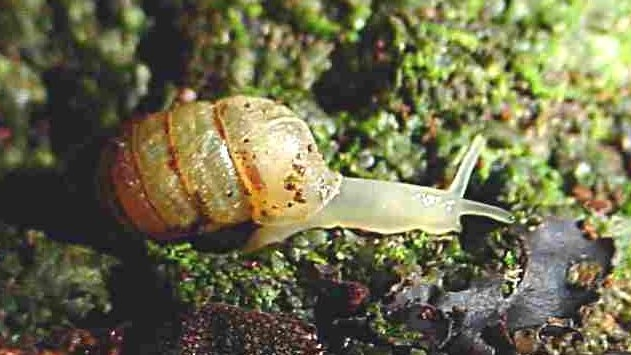
- Gonospira uvula

Scientific classification
- Kingdom: Animalia
- Phylum: Mollusca
- Class: Gastropoda
- Order: Stylommatophora
- Suborder: Achatinina
- Superfamily: Streptaxoidea
- Family: Streptaxidae
- Genus: Gonospira; Swainson, 1840

Synonyms
- Ennea (Gonospira) Swainson, 1840 (superseded combination); Orthogibbus Germain, 1919; Orthogibbus (Orthogibbus) Germain, 1919

= Gonospira =

Genus of gastropods

Gonospira is a genus of air-breathing land snails, terrestrial pulmonate gastropod mollusks in the subfamily Orthogibbinae of the family Streptaxidae.

== Distribution ==
Distribution of the genus Gonospira include:

- Mauritius and Rodrigues
- Réunion

== Species ==
Species within the genus Gonospira include:

- Gonospira adamsiana (G.Nevill & H. Nevill, 1871)
- Gonospira bacilla (L. Pfeiffer, 1856)
- Gonospira barclayi (H. Adams, 1868)
- Gonospira bourguignati(Deshayes, 1863)
- Gonospira brevis (Morelet, 1867)
- Gonospira callifera (Morelet, 1860)
- Gonospira chloris Crosse, 1873
- Gonospira cylindrella (H. Adams, 1868)
- Gonospira deshayesi (H. Adams, 1868)
- Gonospira dupontiana Nevill, 1870
- Gonospira funiculus (Valenciennes in Pfeiffer, 1842)
- Gonospira holostoma Morelet, 1875
- Gonospira larreyi Fischer-Piette, Blanc, C.P., Blanc, F. & Salvat, 1994
- Gonospira madgei Kennard, 1943
- Gonospira majuscula (Morelet, 1878)
- Gonospira mauritiana (Morelet, 1860)
- Gonospira metableta Crosse, 1874
- Gonospira modiola (Férussac, 1821)
- Gonospira mondraini (H. Adams, 1868)
- † Gonospira nevilli (H. Adams, 1867)
- Gonospira palanga (Lesson, 1831)
- Gonospira producta (H. Adams, 1868)
- Gonospira rodriguezensis Crosse, 1873
- Gonospira striaticosta Morelet, 1866
- Gonospira teres (L. Pfeiffer, 1856)
- Gonospira testudiae Fischer-Piette, Blanc, C.P., Blanc, F. & Salvat, 1994
- Gonospira turgidula(Deshayes, 1863)
- Gonospira uvula Deshayes, 1863
- Gonospira versipolis (Deshayes, 1851)
- Gonospira viaderi (Madge, 1938)
