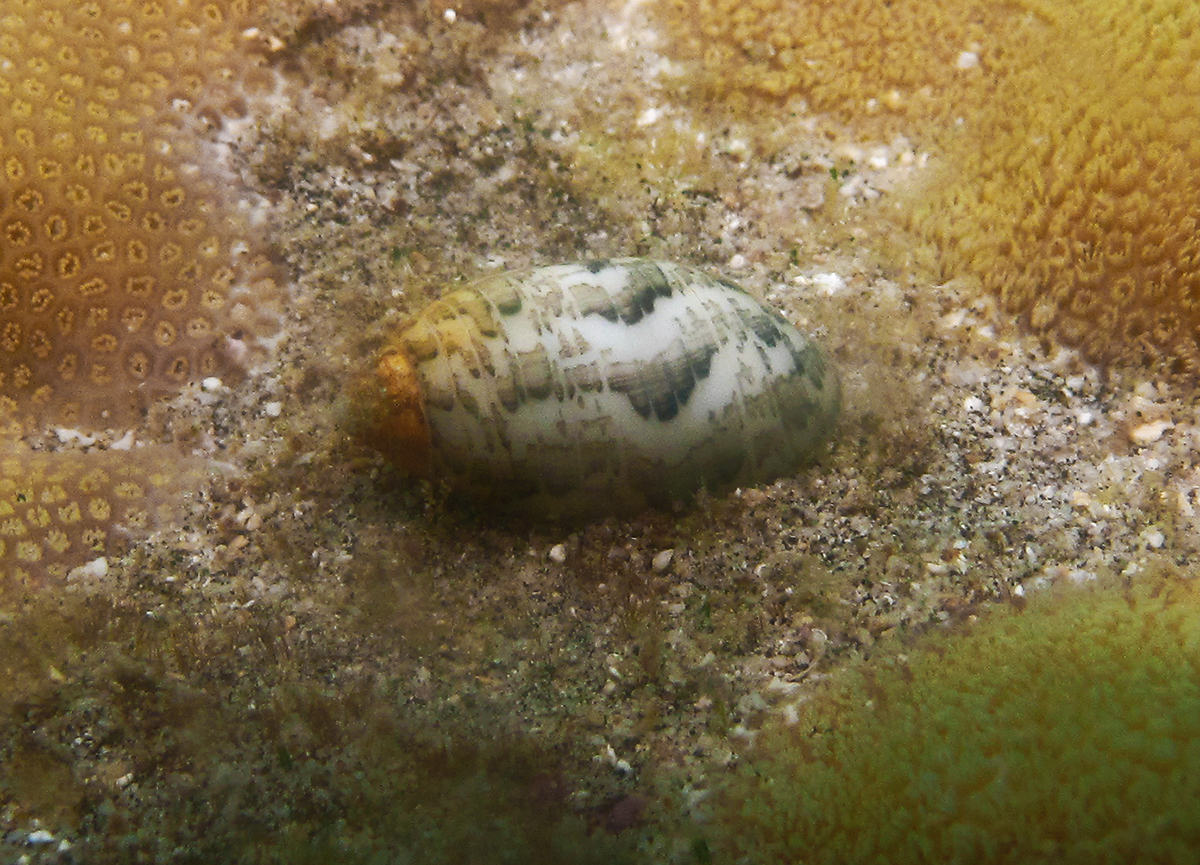
- Pupa sulcata

Scientific classification
- Kingdom: Animalia
- Phylum: Mollusca
- Class: Gastropoda
- Subterclass: Acteonimorpha
- Superfamily: Acteonoidea
- Family: Acteonidae
- Genus: Pupa; Bolten, 1798

Type species
- Pupa grisebla Röding, 1798

Synonyms
- Buccinulus Adams & Adams, 1854; Dactylus Schumacher, 1817; Pupa (Pupa) Röding, 1798· accepted, alternate representation; Pupa (Strigopupa) Habe, 1958; Solidula Fischer von Waldheim, 1807; Strigopupa Habe, 1958

= Pupa (gastropod) =

Genus of gastropods

Pupa is a genus of small sea snails, marine gastropod molluscs in the family Acteonidae.

The genus is named Pupa because the shell of these snails resemble an insect pupa in overall shape. The animal has a large headshield with a deep median slit, separating it into two posteriorly projecting lobes.

== Species ==
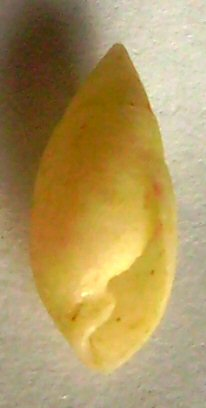
A shell of Pupa affinis

According to the World Register of Marine Species (WoRMS), the following species are included within the genus Pupa:

- Pupa affinis (Adams, 1854)
  - Distribution : South Africa, Red Sea, Indo-Pacific
  - Length : 11–20 mm
  - Description : cream-colored shell with horizontal spiraled patterns (dark brown, light brown or greenish) without dark borders; sharp apex
- Pupa alveola (Souverbie, 1863)
  - Distribution : Indo-Pacific
- Pupa coccinata Reeve, 1842 (considered by some to be a color form of Pupa strigosa)
  - Distribution : Japan, tropical Indo-West Pacific
  - Length : 25 mm
  - Description : headshield flaps cover the opening of the mantle cavity; white-colored with many orange-red spots in spiraling bands
- Pupa davisi Kilburn, 1975
  - Distribution: South Africa
  - Length : 12.5 mm
  - Description : cream-colored shell with sharp apex.
- Pupa hyalina Verco, 1907
- Pupa niecaensis Barnard, 1963
- Pupa nitulida (Lamarck, 1816) Smooth pink pupa
- Pupa pascuana Raines, 2002
- Pupa pudica (Adams, 1854)
  - Distribution: Hawaii
  - Length : 7 mm
  - Description : pink-colored elongate shell, with spiral bands of lightbrown patterns.
- † Pupa reticulata (Martin, 1884)
- Pupa sekii Habe, 1958
- Pupa sinica Lin, 1989
- Pupa solidula Linnaeus, 1758 Solid pupa
- Pupa strigosa (Gould, 1859)
- Pupa sulcata (Gmelin, 1791) Furrowed pupa
  - Distribution : cosmopolitan, tropical Indo-Pacific, Kermadec Islands, Japan
  - Length : 10–25 mm
  - Description : intertidal and up to depths of 30 m, burrowing in the sand; lightbrown shell with horizontal darker bands, where the darkest parts form a vertical band; sharp apex
- Pupa suturalis (Adams, 1854)
  - Distribution : Indo-Pacific
- Pupa tessellata (Reeve, 1842)
- Pupa tragulata Iredale, 1936

Species brought into synonymy

- Pupa (Rictaxiella) Habe, 1958: synonym of Rictaxiella Habe, 1958
- Pupa alba (Hutton, 1873): synonym of Abida bigerrensis (Moquin-Tandon, 1856)
- Pupa amodesta Mighels, 1845: synonym of Pronesopupa amodesta (Mighels, 1845) (original combination)
- Pupa bourguignati Deshayes, 1863 (original combination): synonym of Gonospira bourguignati (Deshayes, 1863)
- Pupa bryanti L. Pfeiffer, 1867: synonym of Cerion rubicundum (Menke, 1829) (junior synonym)
- Pupa choshiensis (Habe, 1958): synonym of Rictaxiella choshiensis Habe, 1958
- Pupa cinerea Draparnaud, 1801: synonym of Solatopupa similis (Bruguière, 1792)
- Pupa crassilabris G. B. Sowerby II, 1875: synonym of Cerion striatellum (Guerin-Méneville, 1829)
- Pupa daedalea Deshayes, 1851: synonym of Plagiodontes daedaleus (Deshayes, 1851)
- Pupa detrita L. Pfeiffer, 1854: synonym of Cerion incanum (Leidy, 1851)
- Pupa flammea (Gmelin, 1791): synonym of Maxacteon flammeus (Bruguière, 1789)
- Pupa fusus L. Pfeiffer, 1848: synonym of Gonospira palanga (Lesson, 1831)
- Pupa gibba R. T. Lowe, 1852: synonym of Leiostyla gibba (R. T. Lowe, 1852) (original combination)
- Pupa grisebla Röding, 1798: synonym of Pupa solidula (Linnaeus, 1758)
- Pupa incana Leidy, 1851: synonym of Cerion incanum (Leidy, 1851)
- Pupa incrassata G. B. Sowerby II, 1878: synonym of Cerion incrassatum (G. B. Sowerby II, 1878) (original combination)
- Pupa intersecta Deshayes, 1863: synonym of Gonospira bourguignati (Deshayes, 1863)
- Pupa kirki (Hutton, 1873): synonym of Pupa affinis (A. Adams, 1855)
- Pupa nivea (Angas, 1871) synonym of Pupa affinis (A. Adams, 1855)
- Pupa novoseelandica L. Pfeiffer, 1853: synonym of Phenacharopa novoseelandica (L. Pfeiffer, 1853)
- Pupa palanga Lesson, 1831: synonym of Gonospira palanga (Lesson, 1831)
- Pupa pusilla Des Moulins, 1835: synonym of Chondrina bigorriensis (Des Moulins, 1835)
- Pupa roseomaculata Iredale, 1936: synonym of Pupa solidula (Linnaeus, 1758)
- † Pupa starboroughensis L. C. King, 1934 : synonym of † Crenilabium starboroughense (L. C. King, 1934)
- Pupa thaanumi Pilsbry, 1917: synonym of Pupa affinis (Adams, 1854)
- Pupa turrita Anton, 1839: synonym of Clessinia striata (Spix, 1827) (junior synonym)
- Pupa umbilicata Draparnaud, 1801: synonym of Lauria cylindracea (da Costa, 1778)
- Pupa uvula Deshayes, 1863: synonym of Gonospira uvula (Deshayes, 1863) (original combination)
- Pupa vermiculosa Morelet, 1860: synonym of Leiostyla vermiculosa (Morelet, 1860) (original combination)
- Pupa versipolis L. Pfeiffer, 1841: synonym of Gonospira versipolis (L. Pfeiffer, 1841)

Taxa inquirenda (use in recent literature currently undocumented)

- Pupa dormeyeri G. B. Sowerby II, 1878
- Pupa gracilis G. B. Sowerby I, 1834
- Pupa maugeri G. B. Sowerby I, 1834
- Pupa ringens G. B. Sowerby II, 1878
- Pupa zebra G. B. Sowerby II, 1875

The database Indo-Pacific Molluscan Database (OBIS) also includes the following names in current use :

- Pupa acuta
- Pupa fraterculus
- Pupa insculpta

- Pupa clathrata Yokoyama, 1922
  - Distribution : Japan

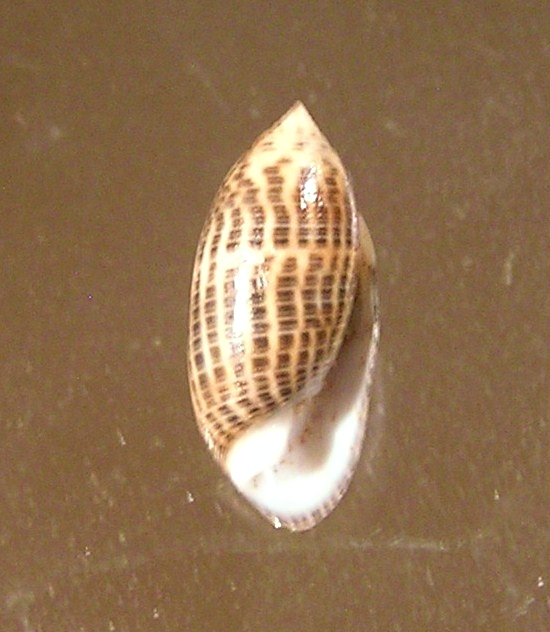
Pupa fumata

- Pupa fumata Gould, 1859 Brown Pupa
  - Distribution : tropical, Western Australia, Indo-Pacific
  - Length : 20 mm
  - Description : shell with spiral ribs; patterns of brown or gray spots on a cream-colored background; whorls separated by a white narrow band.
