= Dupontia =

Dupontia may refer to:

- Dupontia (plant), a grass genus in the family Poaceae
- Dupontia (gastropod), a land snail genus in the family Helixarionidae
