= Dupontia proletaria =

Conservation status
- Extinct (IUCN 2.3)

Scientific classification
- Kingdom: Animalia
- Phylum: Mollusca
- Class: Gastropoda
- Order: Stylommatophora
- Family: Euconulidae
- Genus: Dupontia
- Species: †D. proletaria

Binomial name
- †Dupontia proletaria Morelet, 1860

Extinct species of gastropod

Dupontia proletaria is an extinct species of small air-breathing land snail, terrestrial pulmonate gastropod mollusk in the family Euconulidae, the hive snails.

This species is endemic to Mauritius and Réunion.
