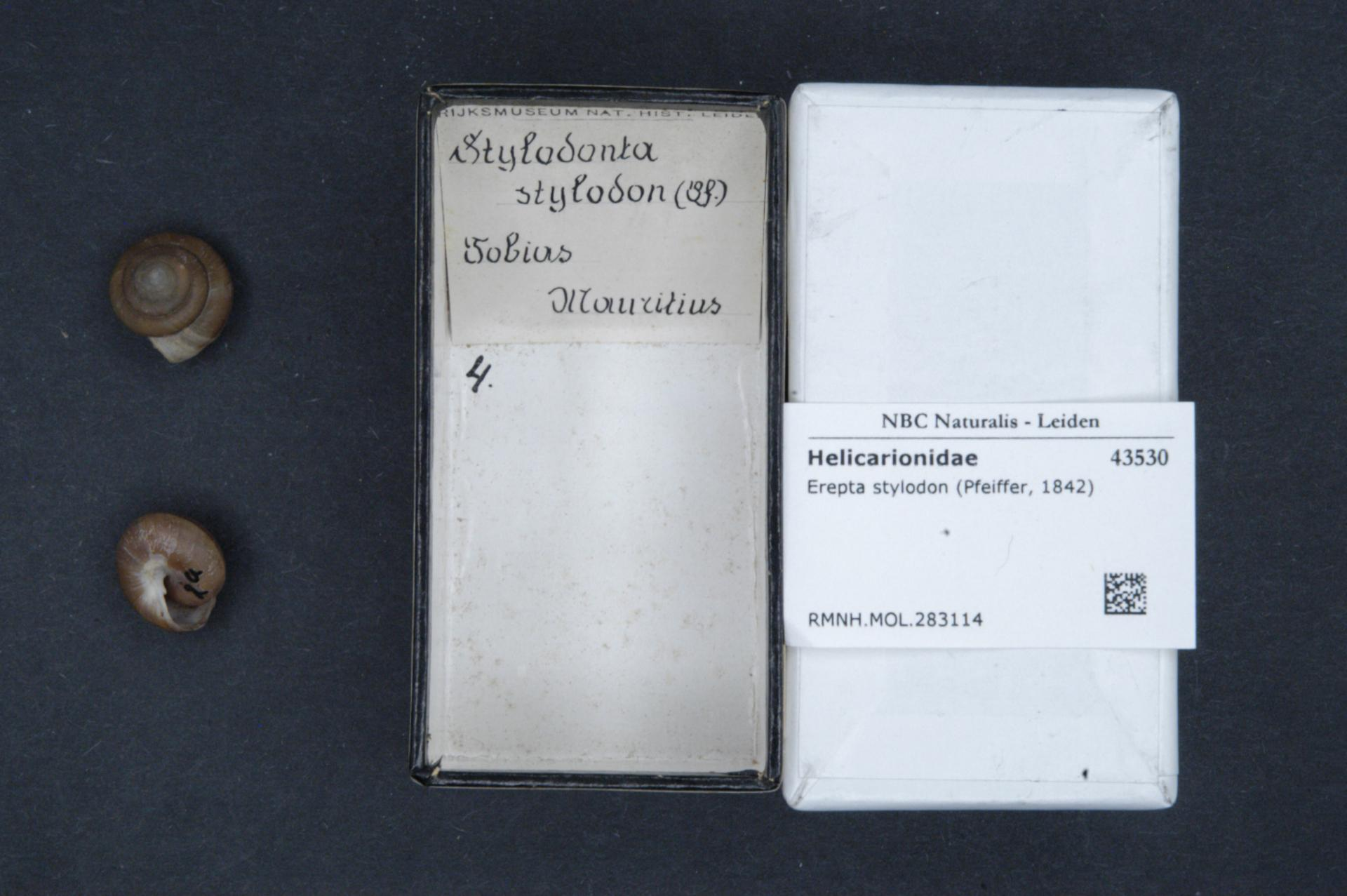

Conservation status
- Critically Endangered (IUCN 2.3)

Scientific classification
- Kingdom: Animalia
- Phylum: Mollusca
- Class: Gastropoda
- Order: Stylommatophora
- Family: Helicarionidae
- Genus: Erepta
- Species: E. stylodon

Binomial name
- Erepta stylodon Pfeiffer, 1842

= Erepta stylodon =

Species of gastropod

Erepta stylodon is a species of air-breathing land snail, a terrestrial pulmonate gastropod mollusc in the family Helicarionidae. This species is endemic to Mauritius.
