= Gonospira striaticosta =

Conservation status
- Vulnerable (IUCN 2.3)

Scientific classification
- Domain: Eukaryota
- Kingdom: Animalia
- Phylum: Mollusca
- Class: Gastropoda
- Order: Stylommatophora
- Family: Streptaxidae
- Genus: Gonospira
- Species: G. striaticosta

Binomial name
- Gonospira striaticosta (Morelet, 1866)

Synonyms
- Pupa striaticosta Morelet, 1866 (original combination)

Species of gastropod

Gonospira striaticosta a species of air-breathing land snail, terrestrial pulmonate gastropod mollusk in the family Streptaxidae.

This species is endemic to Mauritius.
