= Harmogenanina =

Scientific classification
- Kingdom: Animalia
- Phylum: Mollusca
- Class: Gastropoda
- Order: Stylommatophora
- Family: Helicarionidae
- Genus: Harmogenanina; Germain, 1918

Genus of gastropods

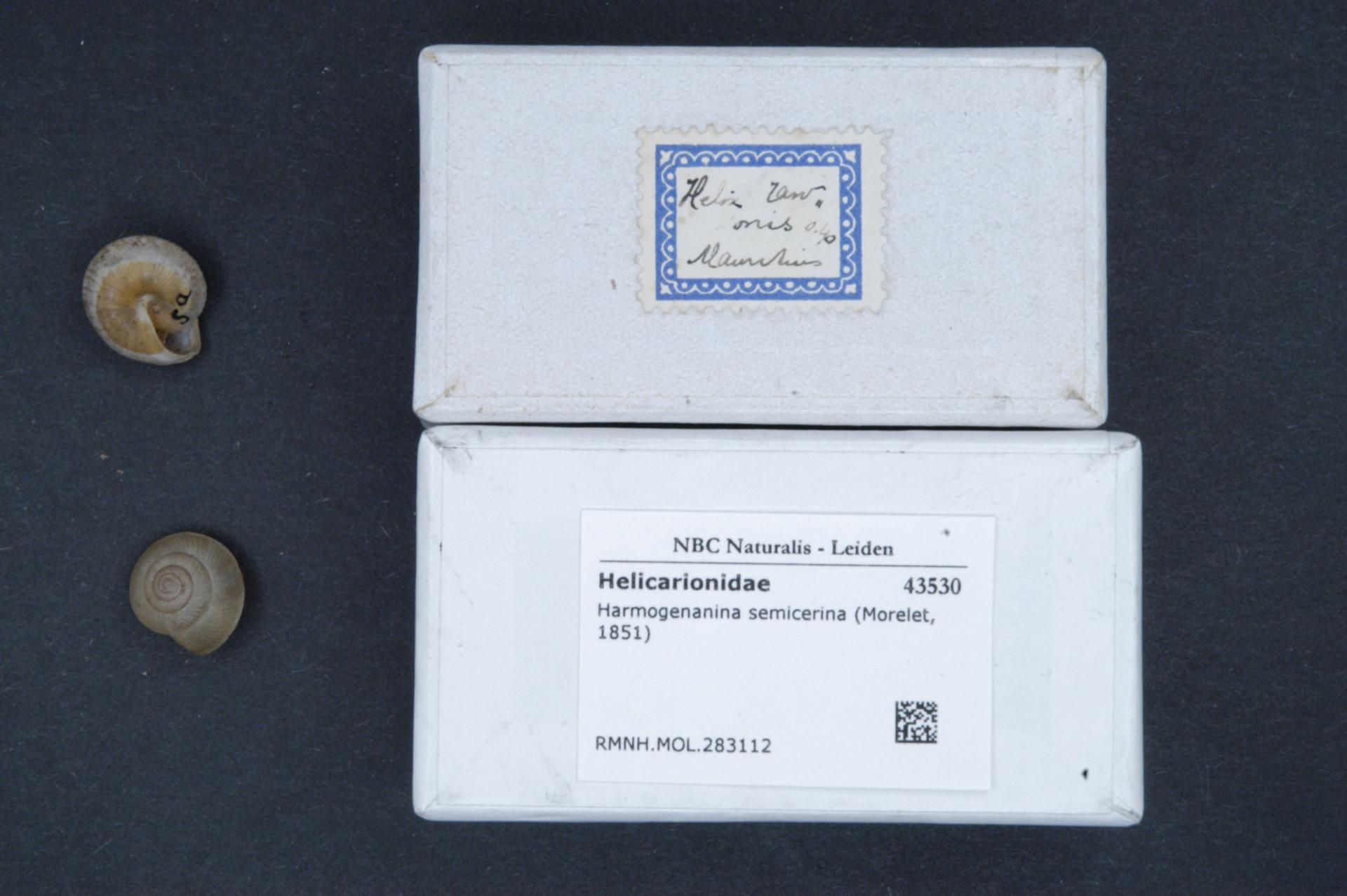
Harmogenanina semicerina (Morelet, 1851).

Harmogenanina is a genus of air-breathing land snails or semislugs, terrestrial pulmonate gastropod mollusks in the family Helicarionidae.

== Species ==
Species within the genus Harmogenanina include:

- Harmogenanina argentea (Reeve, 1852)
- Harmogenanina detecta (A. Férussac, 1827)
- Harmogenanina implicata (G. Nevill, 1870)
- Harmogenanina linophora (Morelet, 1860)
- Harmogenanina petiti Fischer-Piette & Bedoucha, 1965
- Harmogenanina semicerina (Morelet, 1851)
