= Gonospira madgei =

Conservation status
- Vulnerable (IUCN 2.3)

Scientific classification
- Kingdom: Animalia
- Phylum: Mollusca
- Class: Gastropoda
- Order: Stylommatophora
- Family: Streptaxidae
- Genus: Gonospira
- Species: G. madgei

Binomial name
- Gonospira madgei Kennard, 1943

Species of gastropod

Gonospira madgei is a species of air-breathing land snail, terrestrial pulmonate gastropod mollusk in the family Streptaxidae.

This species is endemic to Mauritius.
