= Ctenophila salaziensis =

Conservation status
- Least Concern (IUCN 2.3)

Scientific classification
- Kingdom: Animalia
- Phylum: Mollusca
- Class: Gastropoda
- Order: Stylommatophora
- Family: Helicarionidae
- Genus: Ctenophila
- Species: C. salaziensis

Binomial name
- Ctenophila salaziensis (Nevill, 1870)

Species of gastropod

Ctenophila salaziensis is a species of small air-breathing land snails, terrestrial pulmonate gastropod mollusks in the family Euconulidae, the hive snails. This species is endemic to Réunion, a French island in the Indian Ocean.
