= Elasmias wakefieldiae =

Scientific classification
- Domain: Eukaryota
- Kingdom: Animalia
- Phylum: Mollusca
- Class: Gastropoda
- Order: Stylommatophora
- Family: Achatinellidae
- Genus: Elasmias
- Species: E. wakefieldiae

Binomial name
- Elasmias wakefieldiae (Cox, 1868)

Synonyms
- Achatinella wakefieldiae Cox, 1868; Elasmias schola Iredale, 1944

Species of land snail

Elasmias wakefieldiae, also known as Wakefield's miniature treesnail, is a species of tree snail that is endemic to Australia.

== Description ==
The globose, ovately conical shell of adult snails is 2.4–2.6 mm in height, with a diameter of 2–2.1 mm, with weakly impressed sutures and rounded whorls with fine spiral grooves. It is transparent white with the apical whorls appearing golden-brown in the living animal. The umbilicus is imperforate. The aperture is subovate. The animal is transparent and colourless.

== Habitat ==
The snail occurs in south-eastern Queensland and New South Wales, as well as on Australia's Lord Howe Island in the Tasman Sea. It lives in trees and in leaf litter.
