= Dupontia nitella =

Conservation status
- Vulnerable (IUCN 2.3)

Scientific classification
- Kingdom: Animalia
- Phylum: Mollusca
- Class: Gastropoda
- Order: Stylommatophora
- Family: Euconulidae
- Genus: Dupontia
- Species: D. nitella

Binomial name
- Dupontia nitella Morelet, 1868

Species of gastropod

Dupontia nitella is a species of small air-breathing land snails, terrestrial pulmonate gastropod mollusks in the family Euconulidae, the hive snails. This species is found in Mauritius and Réunion.
