= Harmogenanina implicata =

Conservation status
- Critically Endangered (IUCN 2.3)

Scientific classification
- Kingdom: Animalia
- Phylum: Mollusca
- Class: Gastropoda
- Order: Stylommatophora
- Family: Helicarionidae
- Genus: Harmogenanina
- Species: H. implicata

Binomial name
- Harmogenanina implicata Nevill, 1870

Species of gastropod

Harmogenanina implicata is a species of air-breathing land snail or semislug, terrestrial pulmonate gastropod mollusk in the family Helicarionidae.

This species is endemic to Mauritius.
