= Gyraulus mauritianus =

Conservation status
- Least Concern (IUCN 3.1)

Scientific classification
- Kingdom: Animalia
- Phylum: Mollusca
- Class: Gastropoda
- Superorder: Hygrophila
- Family: Planorbidae
- Genus: Gyraulus
- Species: G. mauritianus

Binomial name
- Gyraulus mauritianus (Morelet, 1876)

Synonyms
- Planorbis mauritianus Morelet, 1876

Species of gastropod

Gyraulus mauritianus is a species of small, mostly air-breathing, freshwater snail, aquatic pulmonate gastropod mollusk in the family Planorbidae, the ram's horn snails. This species is endemic to Mauritius.
