= Gibbus lyonetianus =

Conservation status
- Extinct (IUCN 2.3)

Scientific classification
- Kingdom: Animalia
- Phylum: Mollusca
- Class: Gastropoda
- Order: Stylommatophora
- Family: Streptaxidae
- Genus: †Gibbus
- Species: †G. lyonetianus

Binomial name
- †Gibbus lyonetianus Pallas, 1780

Extinct species of gastropod

Gibbus lyonetianus is an extinct species of air-breathing land snail, a terrestrial pulmonate gastropod mollusc in the family Streptaxidae.

This species was endemic to Mauritius. It is now extinct.
