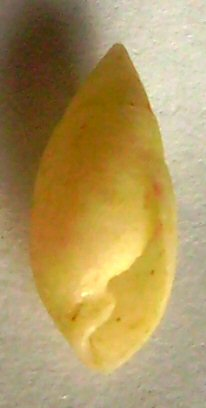
- A shell of Pupa affinis

Scientific classification
- Kingdom: Animalia
- Phylum: Mollusca
- Class: Gastropoda
- Family: Acteonidae
- Genus: Pupa
- Species: P. affinis

Binomial name
- Pupa affinis (A. Adams, 1855)

Synonyms
- Acteon pilsbryi Cossmann, 1902; Buccinulus albus Hutton, 1873; Buccinulus fraterculus Dunker, 1882; Buccinulus gracilis Kirk, 1882; Buccinulus intermedius Angas, 1879; Buccinulus kirki Hutton, 1873; Buccinulus niveus Angas, 1871; Buccinulus strigosus Gould, 1859; Pupa kirki (Hutton, 1873); Pupa nivea (Angas, 1871); Pupa strigosa sekii Habe, 1958; Pupa thaanumi Pilsbry, 1917; Solidula affinis A. Adams, 1855 (basionym); Tornatella fumata Reeve, 1865

= Pupa affinis =

Species of gastropod

Pupa affinis is a species of small sea snail, a marine gastropod mollusc in the family Acteonidae. It is found in the waters around the North Island of New Zealand.

== Description ==
The shell is 15 mm in length and is usually white, beige, or brown, with or without black markings. It is egg shaped (ovate) with an elevated spire. The columella or central axis of the shell has a large double fold.

== Synonyms ==
- Pupa nivea Angas, 1871 : synonym of Pupa affinis (A. Adams, 1855)
  - Distribution : West Australia
  - Length : 14 mm
  - Description : slender, elongate shell with sharp apex; white colored with numerous fine spiral grooves.
- Pupa strigosa Gould, 1859
  - Distribution : Indo-West Pacific, Japan, Taiwan, South China Sea
  - Length : 13 mm
  - Description : intertidal to 100 m in sand; white-colored with many black spiral grooves.
- Pupa strigosa sekii Habe, 1958
  - Distribution : Japan

A synonym of this species, described for science by Frederick Hutton, may have been named for New Zealand cephalopod biologist Thomas William Kirk, or his father Thomas Kirk, curator of the Auckland Museum.
