= Elasmias cernicum =

Conservation status
- Vulnerable (IUCN 2.3)

Scientific classification
- Kingdom: Animalia
- Phylum: Mollusca
- Class: Gastropoda
- Order: Stylommatophora
- Family: Achatinellidae
- Genus: Elasmias
- Species: E. cernicum

Binomial name
- Elasmias cernicum Benson, 1850

Species of gastropod

Elasmias cernicum is a species of tropical, tree-living, air-breathing, land snail, arboreal pulmonate gastropod mollusk in the family Achatinellidae. This species is found in Mauritius and Réunion.
