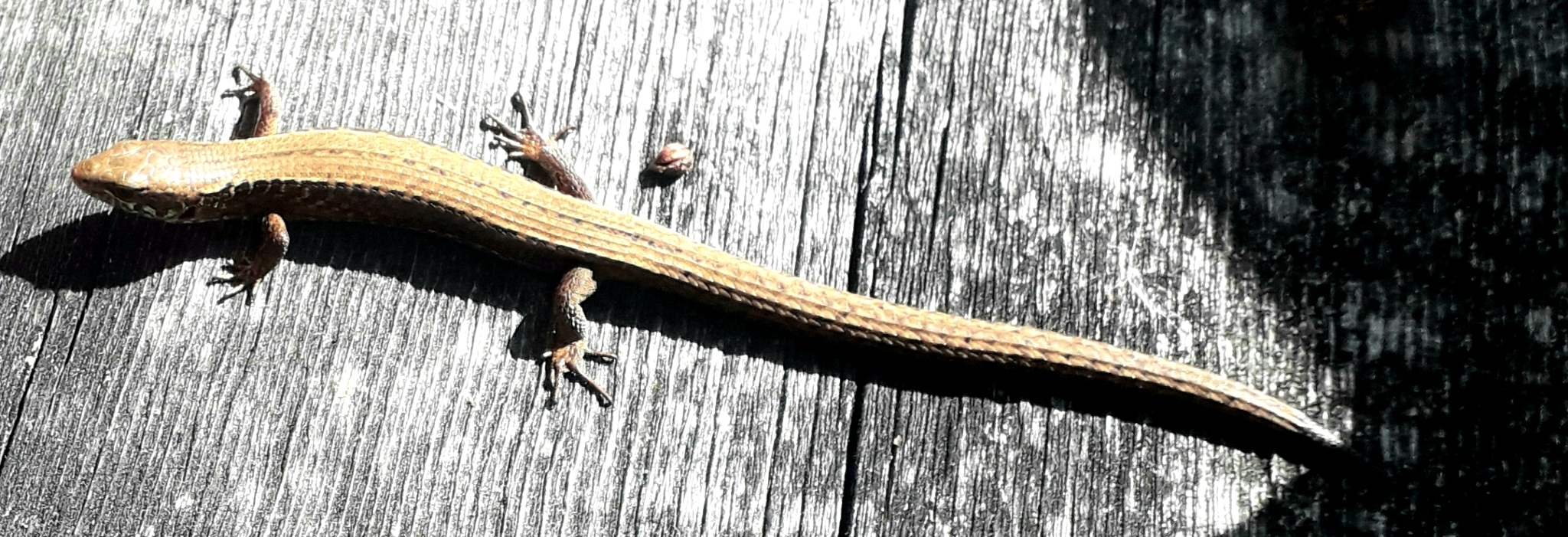

Conservation status
- Least Concern (IUCN 3.1)
- CITES Appendix II

Scientific classification
- Kingdom: Animalia
- Phylum: Chordata
- Class: Reptilia
- Order: Squamata
- Suborder: Anguimorpha
- Family: Anguidae
- Genus: Abronia
- Species: A. moreletii

Binomial name
- Abronia moreletii (Bocourt, 1872)
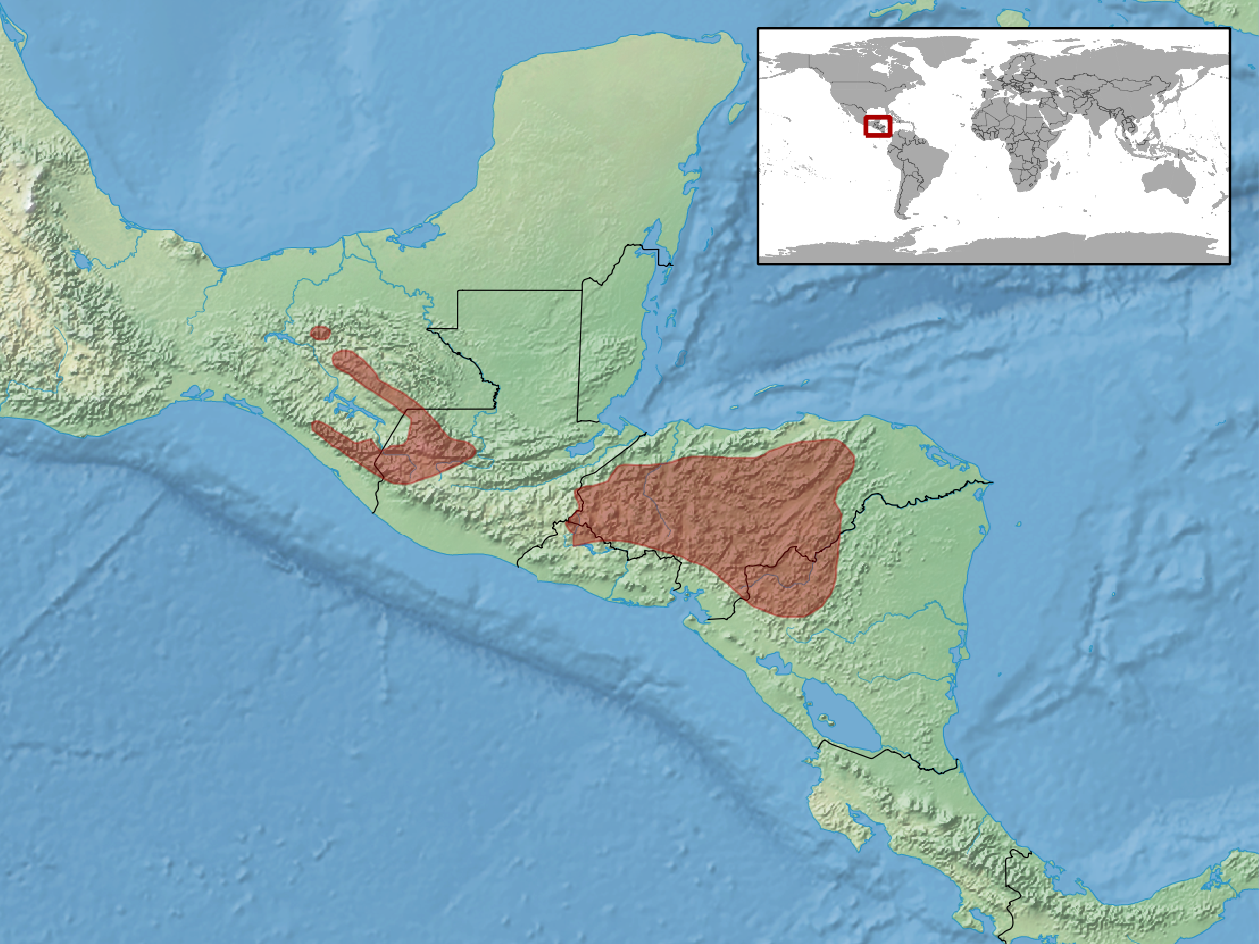

Synonyms
- Gerrhonotus moreletii Bocourt, 1872; Barisia moreletii – Tihen, 1949; Mesaspis moreleti – Liner, 1994; Abronia moreletii — Gutiérrez-Rodríguez et al., 2020

= Abronia moreletii =

Species of lizard

Abronia moreletii, commonly known as Morelet's alligator lizard and escorpión de Morelet in Spanish, is a species of lizard in the subfamily Gerrhonotinae of the family Anguidae. The species is native to Central America. There are four recognized subspecies.

== Etymology ==
The specific name, moreletii, is in honor of French naturalist Pierre Marie Arthur Morelet.

== Geographic range ==
Abronia moreletii is native to southern Mexico, Guatemala, Honduras, El Salvador, and Nicaragua.

== Habitat ==
The natural habitat of Abronia moreletii consists of Central American pine-oak forests and cloud forests between 1,450 and 2,530 metres (4,760 and 8,300 ft) above sea level.

== Behavior ==
Abronia moreletii is terrestrial and semi-arboreal.

== Reproduction ==
The mode of reproduction of Abronia moreletii has been described as being viviparous and as being ovoviviparous.

== Subspecies ==
The following four subspecies are recognized as being valid, including the nominotypical subspecies.

- Abronia moreletii moreletii (Bocourt, 1872)
- Abronia moreletii rafaeli (Hartweg & Tihen, 1946)
- Abronia moreletii salvadorensis (Schmidt, 1928)
- Abronia moreletii temporalis (Hartweg & Tihen, 1946)

Nota bene: A trinomial authority in parentheses indicates that the subspecies was originally described in a genus other than Abronia.

The subspecific name, rafaeli, is in honor of Mexican herpetologist Rafael Martín del Campo.
