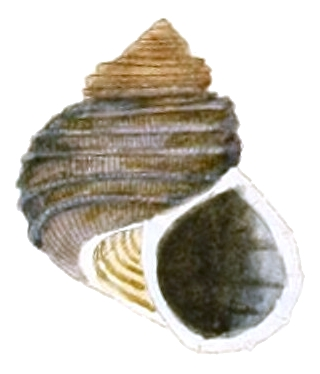
- Drawing of apertural view of the shell of Tropidophora michaudi

Conservation status
- Data Deficient (IUCN 2.3)

Scientific classification
- Kingdom: Animalia
- Phylum: Mollusca
- Class: Gastropoda
- Subclass: Caenogastropoda
- Order: Littorinimorpha
- Family: Pomatiidae
- Genus: Tropidophora
- Species: T. michaudi

Binomial name
- Tropidophora michaudi (Grateloup, 1834)

Synonyms
- Cyclostoma Michaudi Grateloup, 1840

= Tropidophora michaudi =

Species of gastropod

Tropidophora michaudi is a species of land snail with a gill and an operculum, a terrestrial gastropod mollusk in the family Pomatiidae.

This species is endemic to Mauritius.

== Original description ==
Tropidophora fimbriata was originally described as Cyclostoma Michaudi by Jean-Pierre Sylvestre de Grateloup in 1840.

Grateloup's original text (the type description) in Latin language reads as follows:

C. testa perforata, globoso-conica, solida, striatula, carinis 7 — 8 magis minusve

prominentibus, acutiusculis cincta, cinerea vel pallide violacea; spira conica, interdum truncata; anfr. 6 convexis, ultimo basi carina validiore, funiculata ab umbilico infundibuliformi, intus spiraliter sulcato, vix pervio separato; apertura subcirculari; perist. albido, breviter expanso, crenulato, marginibus callo albido junctis, columellari dilatato,

crasso, subreflexo, perforationem occultante, ad carinam basalem obsolete canaliculato.

== Shell description ==
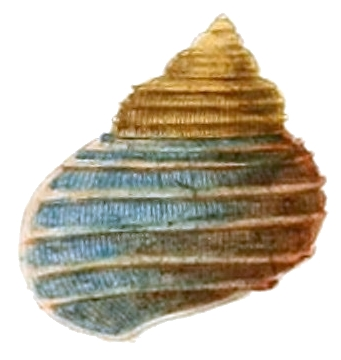
Lateral view of the shell

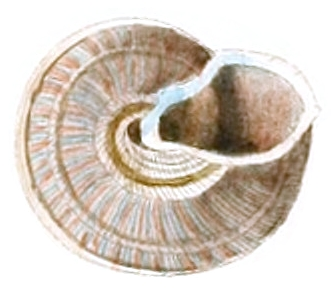
Basal view of the shell
