= Elasmias jaurffreti =

Conservation status
- Data Deficient (IUCN 2.3)

Scientific classification
- Kingdom: Animalia
- Phylum: Mollusca
- Class: Gastropoda
- Order: Stylommatophora
- Family: Achatinellidae
- Genus: Elasmias
- Species: E. jaurffreti

Binomial name
- Elasmias jaurffreti Madge, 1946

Species of gastropod

Elasmias jaurffreti is a species of tropical tree-living air-breathing land snail, arboreal pulmonate gastropod mollusk in the family Achatinellidae. This species is endemic to Mauritius.
