= Plicadomus =

Scientific classification
- Kingdom: Animalia
- Phylum: Mollusca
- Class: Gastropoda
- Order: Stylommatophora
- Family: Streptaxidae
- Subfamily: Orthogibbinae
- Genus: Plicadomus; Swainson, 1840

Type species
- Helix sulcata

Synonyms
- Orthogibbus (Plicadomus) Swainson, 1840; Pupa (Plicadomus) Swainson, 1840

Genus of gastropods

Plicadomus is a genus of air-breathing land snails, terrestrial pulmonate gastropod molluscs in the family Streptaxidae.

== Distribution ==
The genus Plicadomus is endemic to Mauritius.

== Species ==
Species within the genus Plicadomus include:

- Plicadomus newtoni (H. Adams, 1867)
- Plicadomus sulcata (O. F. Müller, 1774)
