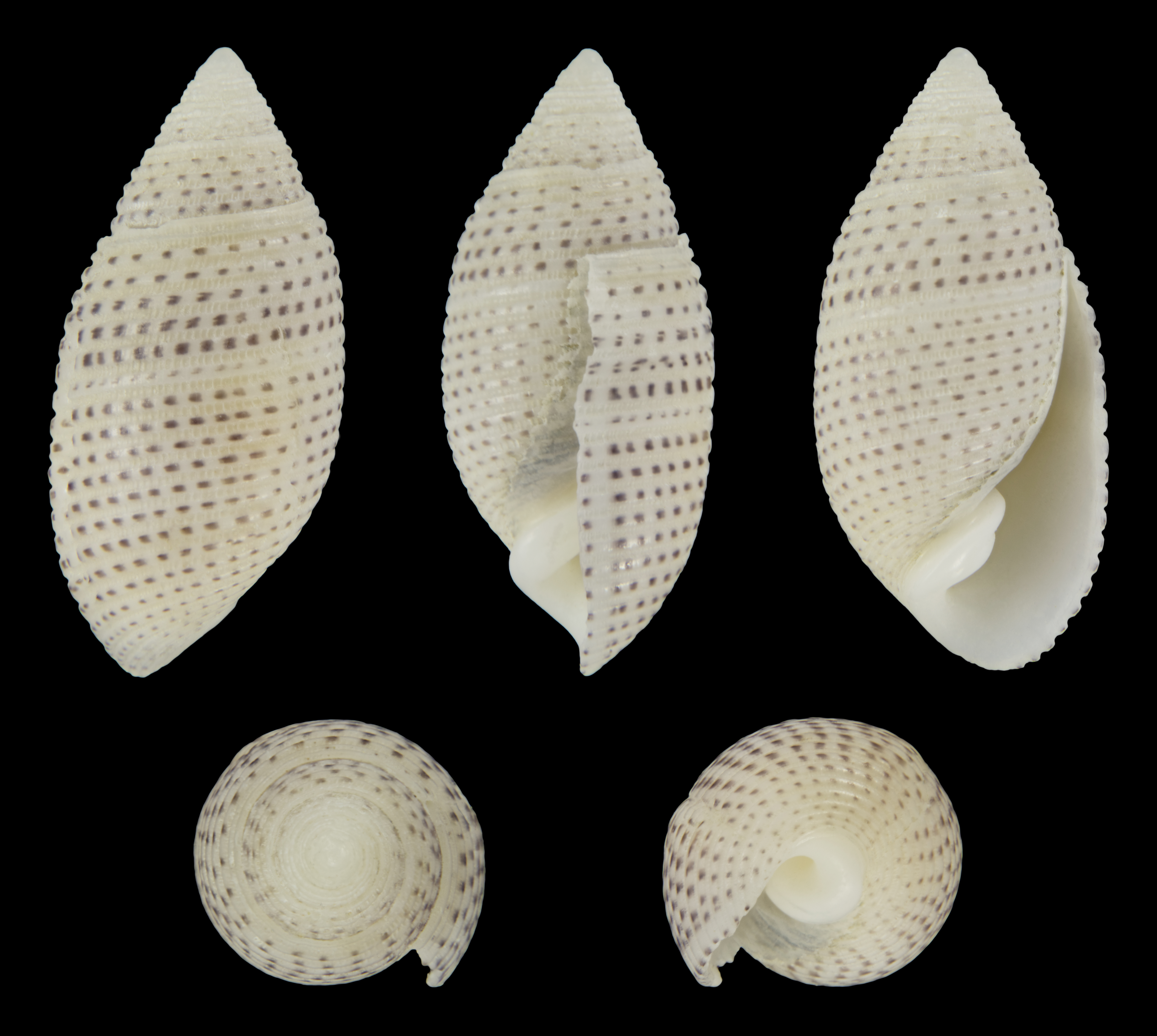
- Five views of a shell of Pupa solidula

Scientific classification
- Kingdom: Animalia
- Phylum: Mollusca
- Class: Gastropoda
- Family: Acteonidae
- Genus: Pupa
- Species: P. solidula

Binomial name
- Pupa solidula (Linnaeus, 1758)

Synonyms
- Buccinulus huttoni Kirk, 1882; Bulla solidula Linnaeus, 1758 (original combination); Dactylus punctatus Schumacher, 1817; Pupa (Pupa) solidula (Linnaeus, 1758) · accepted, alternate representation; Pupa grisebla Röding, 1798 (invalid: unnecessary substitute name for Bulla solidula); Pupa roseomaculata Iredale, 1936; Solidula solidula (Linnaeus, 1758); Tornatella fumata Reeve, 1865; Tornatella solidula Bruguière

= Pupa solidula =

Solid pupa

Species of gastropod

Pupa solidula, common name the solid pupa, is a species of small sea snail, a marine gastropod mollusc in the family Acteonidae.

== Description ==
The size of the shell varies between 15 mm and 40 mm.

The thick shell is ovate, oblong and cylindrical. It shows slightly impressed, transverse striae, traversed by oblong, brown spots, and often intermixed with other reddish spots, especially upon the whorls. A narrow, white band, surrounds towards the middle, the lowest whorl. The conical spire is pointed. The oblong aperture is narrowed, a little compressed towards its upper third, and dilated at its lower part. Two folds upon the columella, are separated by quite a deep, semicircular groove, the larger, two-lobed.

== Distribution ==
This marine species occurs in the tropical Indo-West Pacific.
