= Gonospira holostoma =

Conservation status
- Vulnerable (IUCN 2.3)

Scientific classification
- Kingdom: Animalia
- Phylum: Mollusca
- Class: Gastropoda
- Order: Stylommatophora
- Family: Streptaxidae
- Genus: Gonospira
- Species: G. holostoma

Binomial name
- Gonospira holostoma Morelet, 1875

Species of gastropod

Gonospira holostoma is a species of air-breathing land snail, terrestrial pulmonate gastropod mollusk in the family Streptaxidae.

This species is endemic to Mauritius.
