= Harmogenanina linophora =

Conservation status
- Extinct (IUCN 2.3)

Scientific classification
- Kingdom: Animalia
- Phylum: Mollusca
- Class: Gastropoda
- Order: Stylommatophora
- Family: Helicarionidae
- Genus: Harmogenanina
- Species: †H. linophora

Binomial name
- †Harmogenanina linophora Morelet, 1860

Species of gastropod

†Harmogenanina linophora was a species of air-breathing land snails or semi-slugs, terrestrial pulmonate gastropod mollusks in the family Helicarionidae.

This species was endemic to Mauritius and Réunion. It is now extinct.
