= Elasmias quadrasi =

Conservation status
- Data Deficient (IUCN 2.3)

Scientific classification
- Kingdom: Animalia
- Phylum: Mollusca
- Class: Gastropoda
- Order: Stylommatophora
- Family: Achatinellidae
- Genus: Elasmias
- Species: E. quadrasi

Binomial name
- Elasmias quadrasi (Moellendorff, 1894)

Species of gastropod

Elasmias quadrasi is a species of tropical, tree-living, air-breathing, land snails, arboreal pulmonate gastropod mollusks in the family Achatinellidae. This species is found in Guam and Northern Mariana Islands.

== See also ==
List of land snails of the Mariana Islands
