= Elasmias kitaiwojimanum =

Conservation status
- Vulnerable (IUCN 2.3)

Scientific classification
- Kingdom: Animalia
- Phylum: Mollusca
- Class: Gastropoda
- Order: Stylommatophora
- Family: Achatinellidae
- Genus: Elasmias
- Species: E. kitaiwojimanum

Binomial name
- Elasmias kitaiwojimanum (Pilsbry & Hirase, 1903)

Species of land snail

Elasmias kitaiwojimanum is a species of tropical tree-living, air-breathing, land snails, arboreal pulmonate gastropod mollusks in the family Achatinellidae. This species is endemic to Japan.
