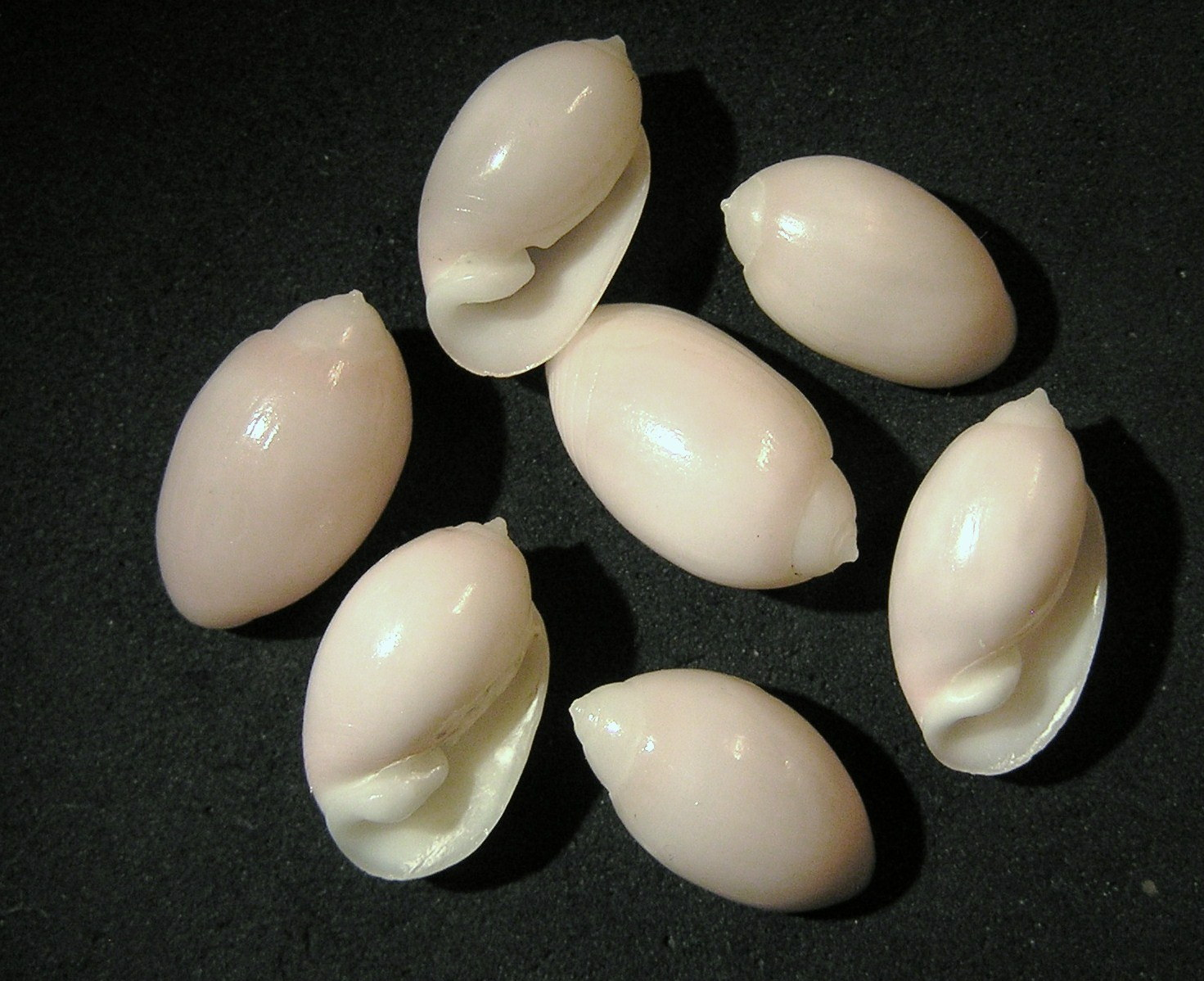
- A collection of shells of Pupa nitidula

Scientific classification
- Kingdom: Animalia
- Phylum: Mollusca
- Class: Gastropoda
- Family: Acteonidae
- Genus: Pupa
- Species: P. nitidula

Binomial name
- Pupa nitidula (Lamarck, 1816)

Synonyms
- Solidula nitidula (Lamarck, 1816); Tornatella nitidula Lamarck, 1816 (original combination)

= Pupa nitidula =

Smooth pink pupa

Species of gastropod

Pupa nitidula, common name the smooth pink pupa, is a species of small sea snail, a marine gastropod mollusc in the family Acteonidae.

== Description ==
The length of the shell varies between 10 mm and 20 mm.

The thick, ovate shell is oblong and smooth. It is of rosy white color. It shows transverse striae varying in number at the base of the body whorl. The spire is short and pointed at its summit. It is composed of six or seven very approximate whorls. The aperture is oblong, narrow, and a little effuse at its base. The outer lip is thickened upon its interior, smooth and sharp throughout its whole extent. The columella, which is thickened, shows two folds. Of these two, the lower fold is the larger and is sub-quadrangular, the upper, which is much smaller, is separated from the other, by a semicircular, very deep groove.

== Distribution ==
This marine species occurs in the Indian Ocean off East Africa, Madagascar, Réunion, Mascarene Basin; off the Philippines, New Caledonia and Australia (Queensland)
