= Elasmias =

Scientific classification
- Kingdom: Animalia
- Phylum: Mollusca
- Class: Gastropoda
- Order: Stylommatophora
- Family: Achatinellidae
- Genus: Elasmias; Pilsbry, 1910

Genus of gastropods

Elasmias is a genus of tropical tree-living air-breathing land snails, arboreal pulmonate gastropod mollusks in the family Achatinellidae.

Elasmias is the type genus of the tribe Elasmiatini.

== Species ==
Species within the genus Elasmias include:

- Elasmias cernicum
- Elasmias jaurffreti
- Elasmias kitaiwojimanum
- Elasmias quadrasi
- Elasmias wakefieldiae Cox, 1868
