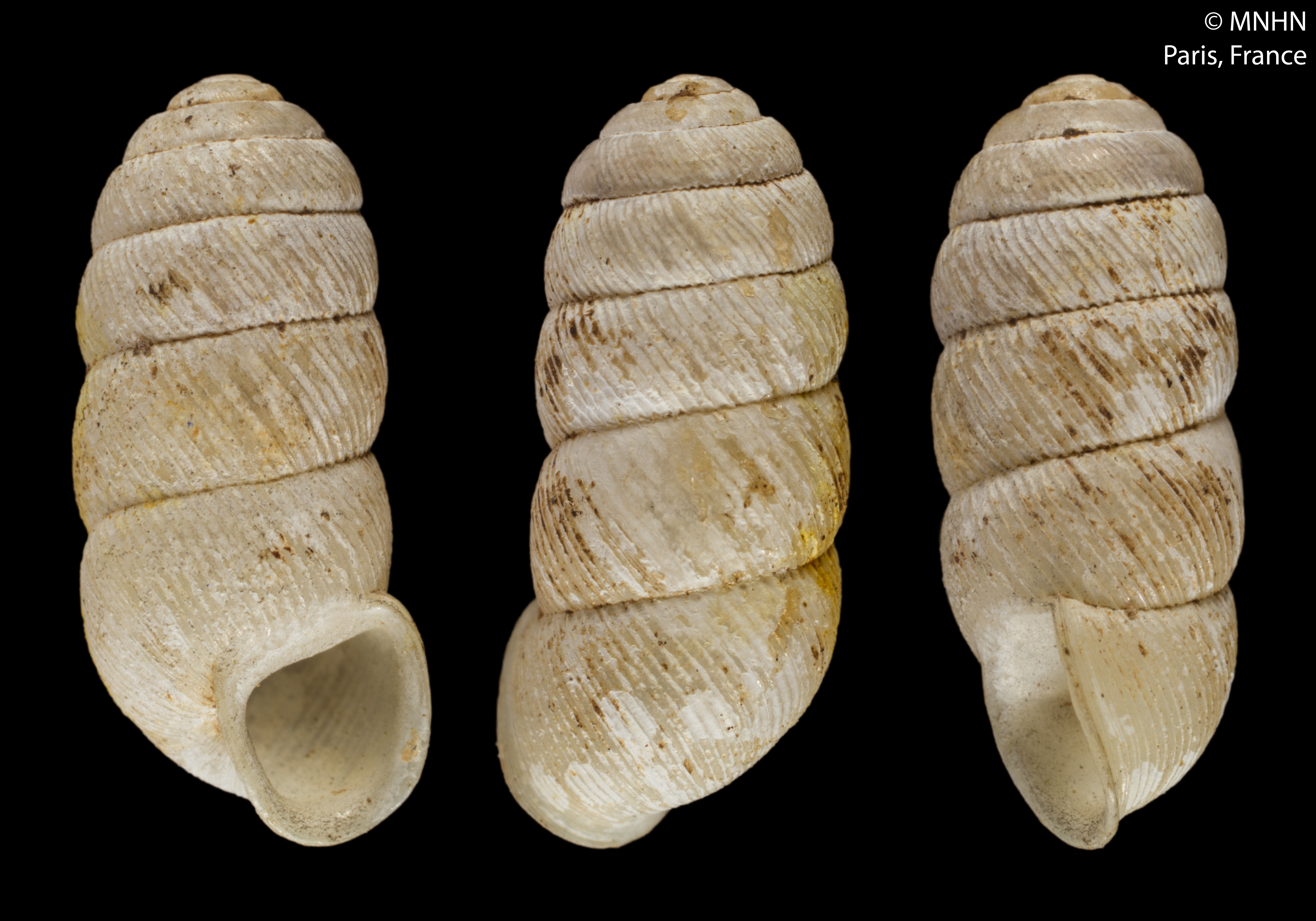
- Shell of Gonospira funiculus (syntype at MNHN, Paris)

Conservation status
- Least Concern (IUCN 2.3)

Scientific classification
- Kingdom: Animalia
- Phylum: Mollusca
- Class: Gastropoda
- Order: Stylommatophora
- Family: Streptaxidae
- Genus: Gonospira
- Species: G. funiculus

Binomial name
- Gonospira funiculus (Valenciennes in Pfeiffer, 1842)

Synonyms
- Gonospira (Orthogibbus) funiculus (Valenciennes in Pfeiffer, 1842)· accepted, alternate representation; Gonospira funicula (incorrect grammatical agreement of specific epithet); Pupa funicula Valenciennes in Pfeiffer, 1842 (incorrect grammatical agreement of specific epithet); Pupa funiculus Valenciennes in Pfeiffer, 1842 (original combination)

= Gonospira funiculus =

Species of gastropod

Gonospira funiculus is a species of air-breathing land snail, terrestrial pulmonate gastropod mollusk in the family Streptaxidae.

== Description ==
The length of the shell attains 12.5 mm.

== Distribution ==
This species is endemic to Réunion.
