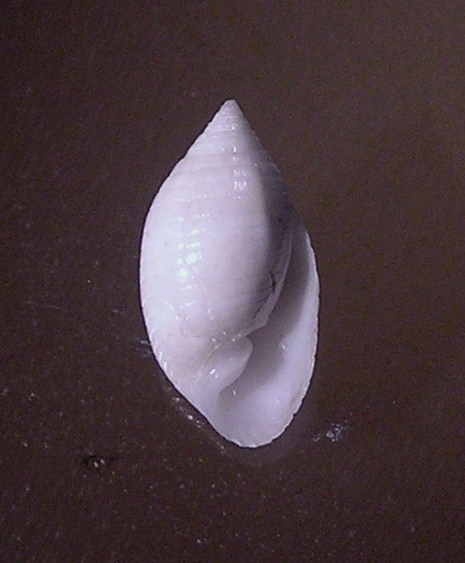
- A shell of Pupa tessellata

Scientific classification
- Kingdom: Animalia
- Phylum: Mollusca
- Class: Gastropoda
- Family: Acteonidae
- Genus: Pupa
- Species: P. tessellata

Binomial name
- Pupa tessellata Reeve, 1842

= Pupa tessellata =

Species of gastropod

Pupa tessellata is a species of small sea snail, a marine gastropod mollusc in the family Acteonidae.

== Distribution ==
This species occurs in the Indo-Pacific.
