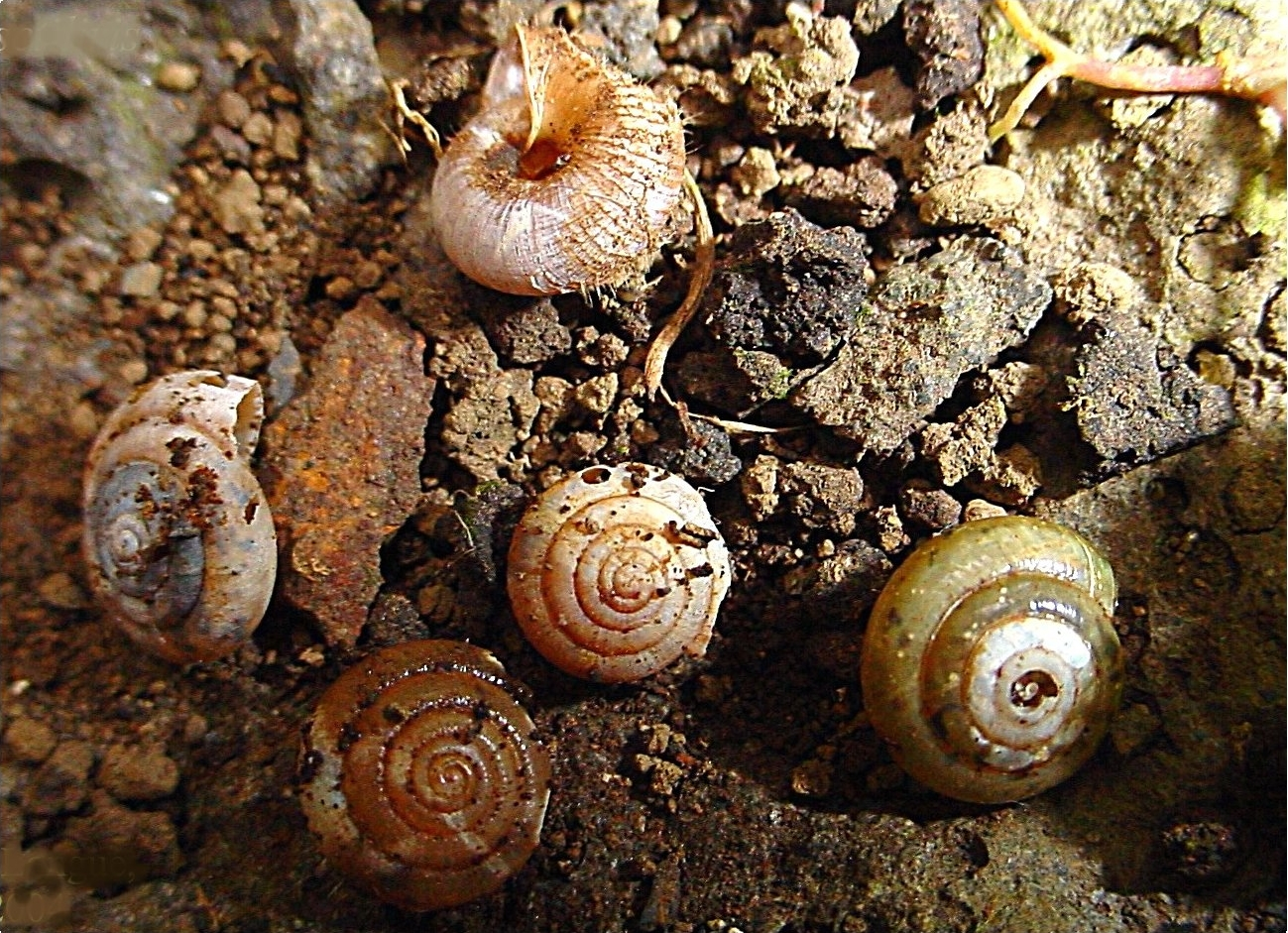
- Five empty shells of Erepta setiliris on Réunion

Conservation status
- Endangered (IUCN 3.1)

Scientific classification
- Kingdom: Animalia
- Phylum: Mollusca
- Class: Gastropoda
- Order: Stylommatophora
- Family: Helicarionidae
- Genus: Erepta
- Species: E. setiliris

Binomial name
- Erepta setiliris (William Henry Benson, 1859)

Synonyms
- Helix setiliris W. H. Benson, 1859; Helix vinsoni Deshayes, 1963; Tachyphasis (Pseudophasis) setiliris (W. H. Benson, 1859); Ctenophila setiliris Benson, 1851

= Erepta setiliris =

Species of gastropod

Erepta setiliris is a species of air-breathing land snail, a terrestrial pulmonate gastropod mollusc in the family Helicarionidae. This species is endemic to Réunion, a French island in the Indian Ocean.
