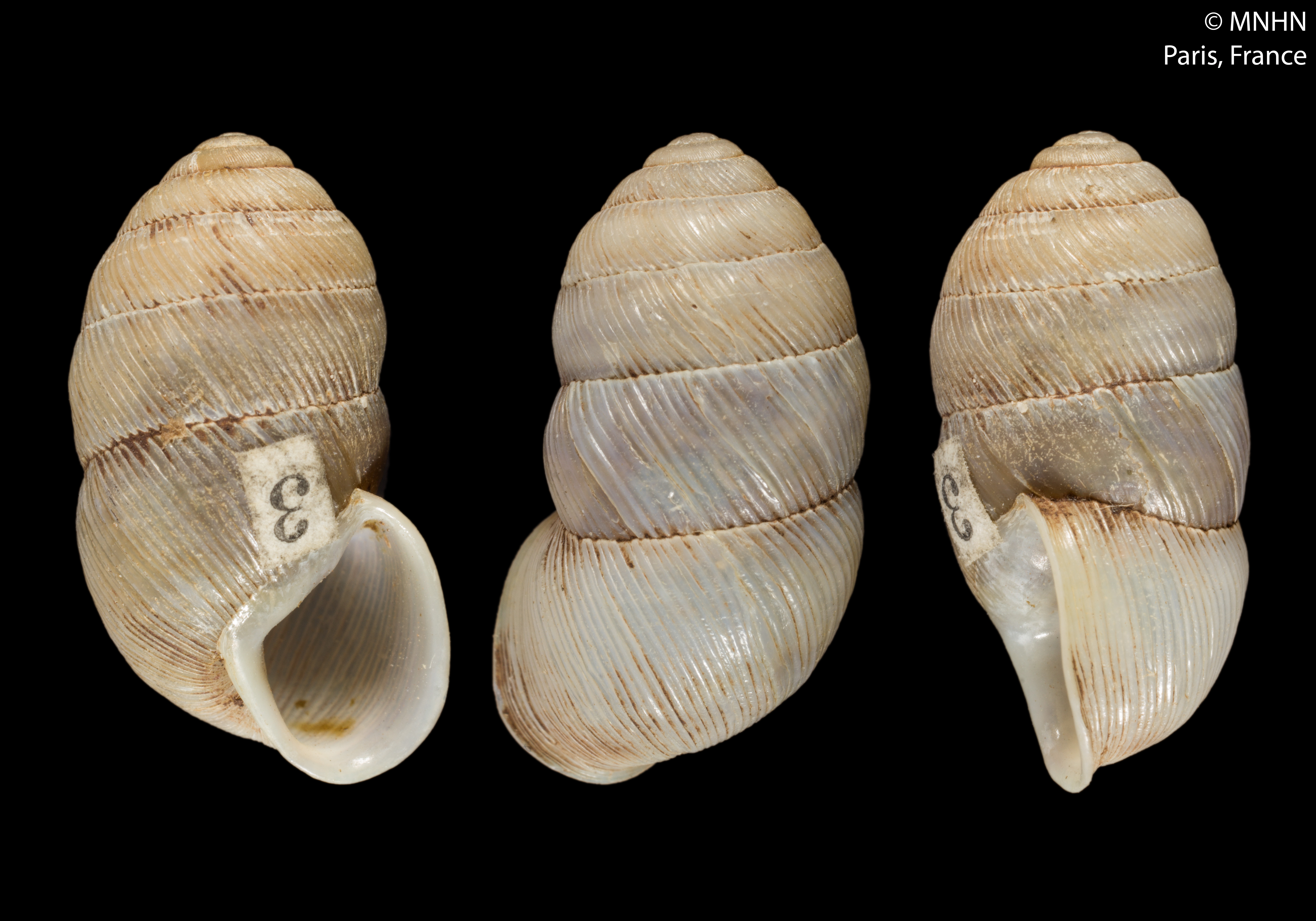
- Shell of Gonospira dupontiana (syntype at MNHN, Paris)

Conservation status
- Critically Endangered (IUCN 2.3)

Scientific classification
- Kingdom: Animalia
- Phylum: Mollusca
- Class: Gastropoda
- Order: Stylommatophora
- Family: Streptaxidae
- Genus: Gonospira
- Species: G. dupontiana

Binomial name
- Gonospira dupontiana (Nevill, 1870)

Synonyms
- Gibbus dupontianus G. Nevill, 1870 (original combination)

= Gonospira dupontiana =

Species of gastropod

Gonospira dupontiana is a species of air-breathing land snail, terrestrial pulmonate gastropod mollusks in the family Streptaxidae.

== Description ==
The length of the shell attains 19 mm.

== Distribution ==
This species is endemic to Mauritius and Rodriguez (in the Mascarenes)
