= Dupontia perlucida =

Conservation status
- Endangered (IUCN 2.3)

Scientific classification
- Kingdom: Animalia
- Phylum: Mollusca
- Class: Gastropoda
- Order: Stylommatophora
- Family: Euconulidae
- Genus: Dupontia
- Species: D. perlucida

Binomial name
- Dupontia perlucida Adams, 1867

Species of gastropod

Dupontia perlucida is a species of small air-breathing land snail, terrestrial pulmonate gastropod mollusk in the family Euconulidae, the hive snails. This species is found in Mauritius.
