= Harmogenanina argentea =

Conservation status
- Vulnerable (IUCN 2.3)

Scientific classification
- Kingdom: Animalia
- Phylum: Mollusca
- Class: Gastropoda
- Order: Stylommatophora
- Family: Helicarionidae
- Genus: Harmogenanina
- Species: H. argentea

Binomial name
- Harmogenanina argentea Reeve, 1852

Species of gastropod

Harmogenanina argentea is a species of air-breathing land snails or semislugs, terrestrial pulmonate gastropod mollusks in the family Helicarionidae.

This species is endemic to Réunion.
