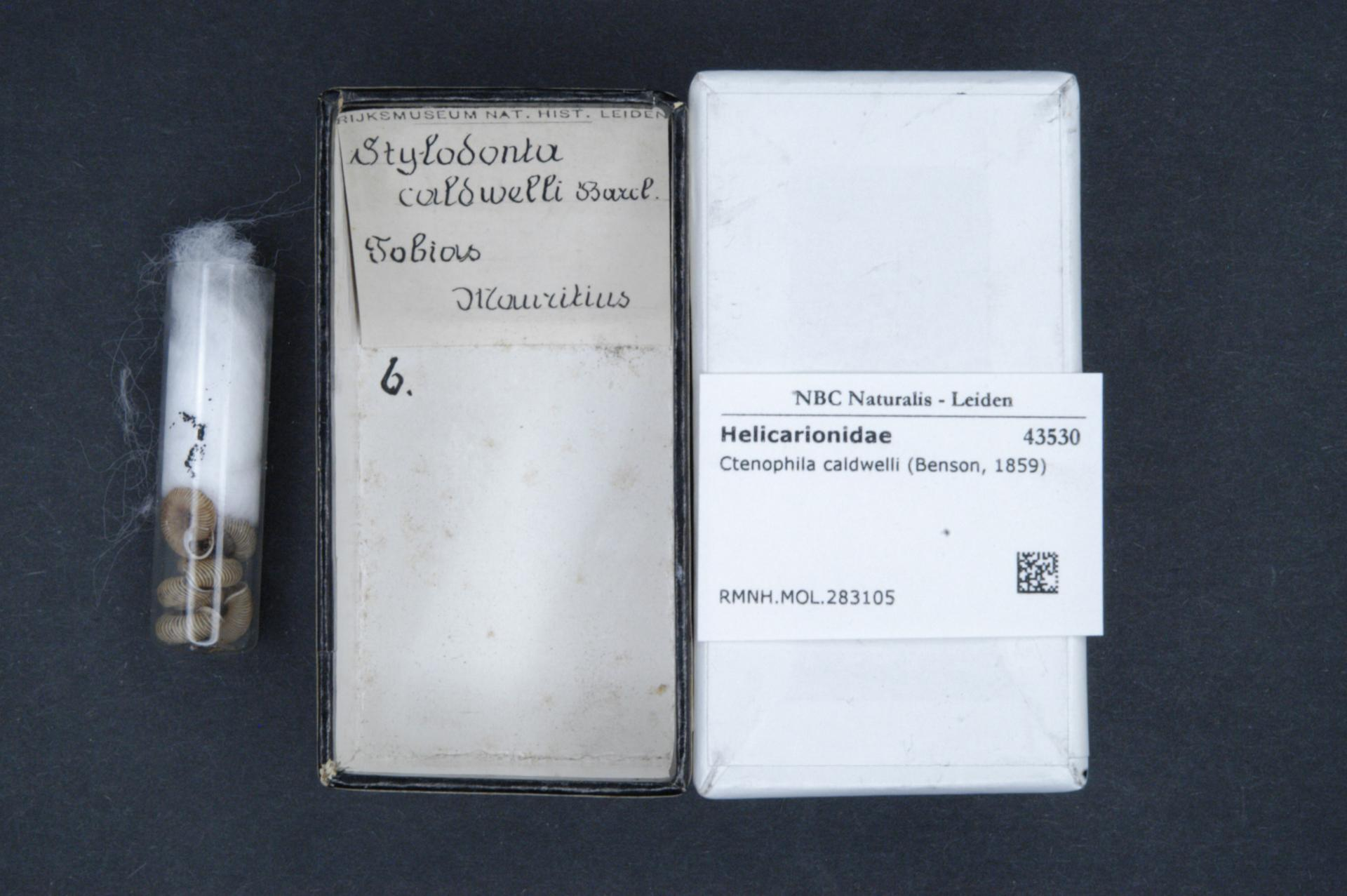
- Ctenophila caldwelli

Scientific classification
- Domain: Eukaryota
- Kingdom: Animalia
- Phylum: Mollusca
- Class: Gastropoda
- Order: Stylommatophora
- Family: Helicarionidae
- Subfamily: Helicarioninae
- Genus: Ctenophila; Ancey, 1882

= Ctenophila =

Genus of gastropods

Ctenophila is a genus of small air-breathing land snails, terrestrial pulmonate gastropod molluscs in the family Helicarionidae.

== Species ==
Species within the genus Ctenophila include:

- Ctenophila aigretteianum O. L. Griffiths, 2000
- Ctenophila caldwelli (W. H. Benson, 1859)
- Ctenophila griffithsi K. C. Emberton, 1994
- Ctenophila milloti (Fischer-Piette, F. Blanc & Salvat, 1975)
- Ctenophila tangolika J. Gerlach, O. Griffiths & Slapcinsky, 2023
- Ctenophila vorticella (H. Adams, 1868)

Species brought into synonymy

Ctenophila planorbina (Germain, 1918): synonym of Ctenophila caldwelli (junior synonym)
