= Gonospira cylindrella =

Conservation status
- Vulnerable (IUCN 2.3)

Scientific classification
- Kingdom: Animalia
- Phylum: Mollusca
- Class: Gastropoda
- Order: Stylommatophora
- Family: Streptaxidae
- Genus: Gonospira
- Species: G. cylindrella

Binomial name
- Gonospira cylindrella (H. Adams, 1868)

Species of gastropod

Gonospira cylindrella is a species of gastropod in the family Streptaxidae. It is endemic to Réunion.
