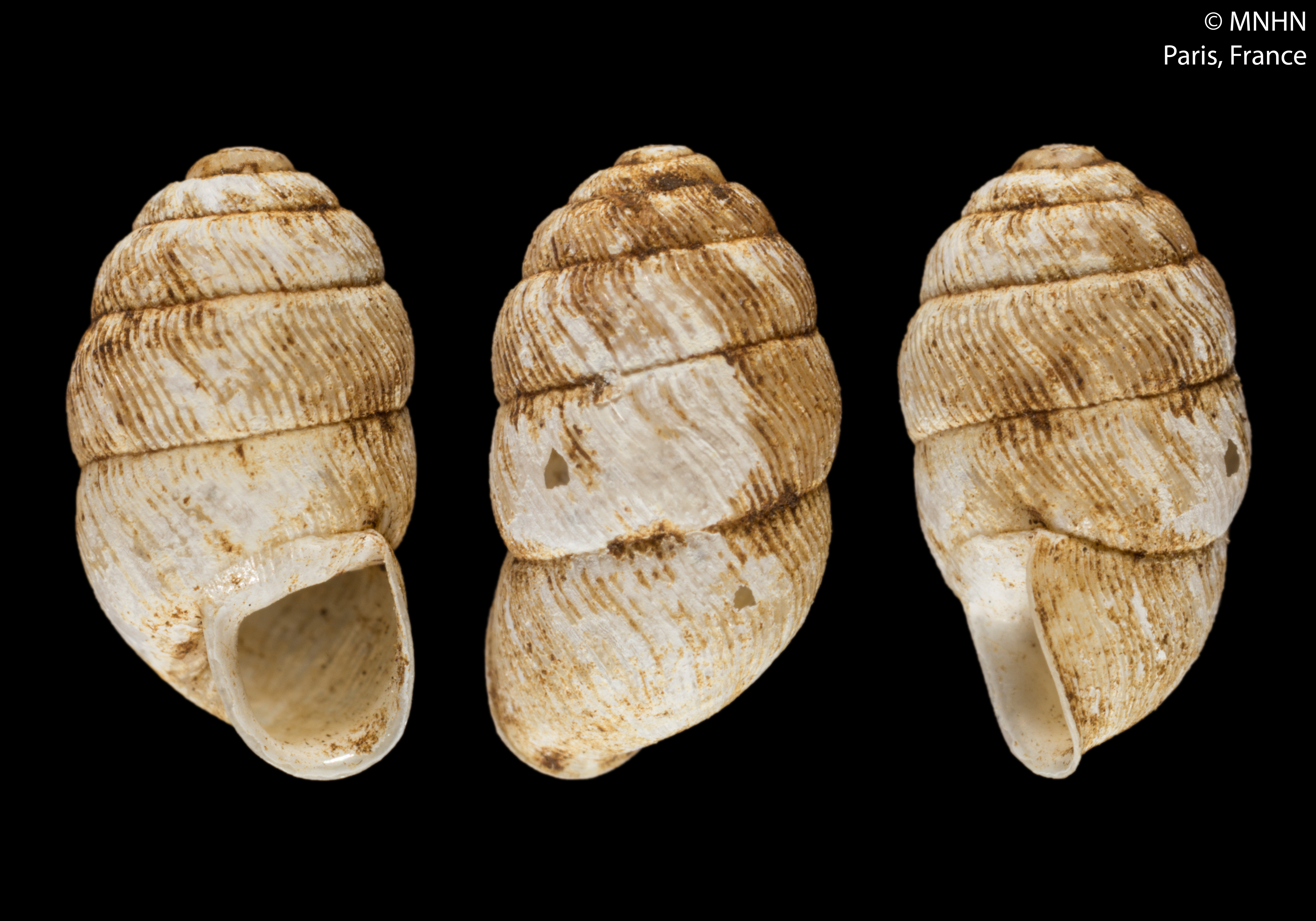
- Shell of Gonospira turgidula (syntype at MNHN, Paris)

Conservation status
- Vulnerable (IUCN 2.3)

Scientific classification
- Kingdom: Animalia
- Phylum: Mollusca
- Class: Gastropoda
- Order: Stylommatophora
- Family: Streptaxidae
- Genus: Gonospira
- Species: G. turgidula

Binomial name
- Gonospira turgidula (Deshayes, 1863)

Synonyms
- Gibbus (Gibbulina) turgidulus (Deshayes, 1863) (superseded combination); Pupa turgidula Deshayes, 1863 (original combination)

= Gonospira turgidula =

Species of gastropod

Gonospira turgidula is a species of air-breathing land snail, terrestrial pulmonate gastropod mollusk in the family Streptaxidae, endemic to Réunion.

== Description ==
The shell is elongated and cylindrical, with a length that can reach up to 7.3 mm.

== Distribution ==
This marine species occurs in the Indian Ocean off Réunion.
