= Gonospira deshayesi =

Conservation status
- Endangered (IUCN 2.3)

Scientific classification
- Kingdom: Animalia
- Phylum: Mollusca
- Class: Gastropoda
- Order: Stylommatophora
- Family: Streptaxidae
- Genus: Gonospira
- Species: G. deshayesi

Binomial name
- Gonospira deshayesi Adams, 1868

Species of gastropod

Gonospira deshayesi is a species of air-breathing land snail, terrestrial pulmonate gastropod mollusk in the family Streptaxidae.

This species is endemic to Réunion, an island located in the Indian Ocean, east of Madagascar.
