= List of non-marine molluscs of Mauritius =

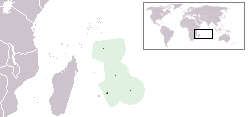
Location of Mauritius

The non-marine molluscs of Mauritius are a part of the molluscan wildlife of Mauritius.

The Outer islands of Mauritius includes Cargados Carajos, Rodrigues and the Agalega Islands.

== Freshwater gastropods ==
Assimineidae

- Omphalotropis hieroglyphica Potiez & Michaud, 1838 – endemic, in salt marshes
- Omphalotropis major Stephanie, Maela & Stephane, 2005 - endemic

Planorbidae

- Africanogyrus rodriguezensis (Crosse, 1873) – endemic
- Bulinus cernicus Morelet, 1867
- Gyraulus mauritianus Morelet – endemic

== Land gastropods ==
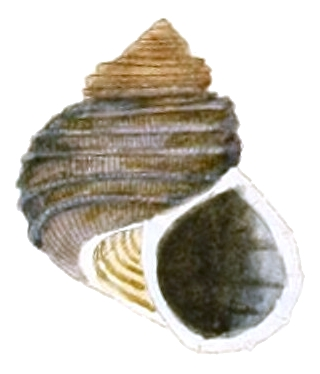
Drawing of apertural view of the shell of land snail Tropidophora michaudi, that is endemic to Mauritius.

Pomatiidae

- Tropidophora articulata (Gray, 1834) – endemic
- Tropidophora michaudi Grateloup, 1840 – endemic

Ariophantidae

- Tanychlamys indica (2005)

Achatinellidae

- Elasmias cernicum Benson, 1850
- Elasmias jaurffreti Madge, 1946 – endemic

Achatinidae

- Lissachatina fulica (1993)
- Lissachatina immaculata (2006)

Euconulidae

- Colparion madgei Laidlaw, 1938 – extinct, was endemic to Mauritius
- Ctenophila caldwelli Benson, 1859 – endemic
- Dancea rodriguezensis – endemic
- Dupontia levis Godwin-Austen, 1908 – endemic
- Dupontia perlucida Adams, 1867
- Dupontia poweri Adams, 1868 – endemic
- Dupontia proletaria Morelet, 1860 – extinct

Vertiginidae

- Nesopupa madgei Peile, 1936
- Nesopupa rodriguezensis Connolly, 1925 – endemic

Streptaxidae – genus Gibbus and genus Gonidomus were endemic to Mauritius, but they are now extinct.

- Gibbus lyonetianus Pallas, 1780 – endemic, extinct
- Gonidomus newtoni Adams, 1867 – endemic, extinct
- Gonidomus sulcatus Peile, 1936 – endemic
- Gonospira duponti Nevill, 1870 – endemic
- Gonospira holostoma Morelet, 1875 – endemic
- Gonospira madgei Kennard, 1943 – endemic
- Gonospira nevilli Adams, 1867 – endemic, extinct
- Gonospira striaticostus Morelet, 1866 – endemic
- Gonospira teres Pfeiffer, 1856 – endemic
- Gulella antelmeana Peile, 1936 – endemic
- Microstrophia modesta Adams, 1867 – endemic
- Microstrophia nana Peile, 1936 – endemic
- Plicadomus Swainson, 1840 – endemic genus
- Maurennea

Helicidae

- Cornu aspersum 2006

Helicarionidae

- Erepta odontina Morelet, 1851 – endemic
- Erepta stylodon Pfeiffer, 1842 – endemic
- Harmogenanina implicata Nevill, 1870 – endemic
- Erepta nevilli – extinct, was endemic to Mauritius
- Thapsia snelli Connolly, 1925 – endemic

== See also ==
- List of marine molluscs of Mauritius
- List of non-marine molluscs of the Seychelles
- List of non-marine molluscs of Madagascar
- List of non-marine molluscs of Réunion
