= Gulella antelmeana =

Conservation status
- Endangered (IUCN 2.3)

Scientific classification
- Kingdom: Animalia
- Phylum: Mollusca
- Class: Gastropoda
- Order: Stylommatophora
- Family: Streptaxidae
- Genus: Gulella
- Species: G. antelmeana

Binomial name
- Gulella antelmeana Peile, 1936

Species of gastropod

Gulella antelmeana is a species of very small air-breathing land snail, a terrestrial pulmonate gastropod mollusk in the family Streptaxidae. This species is endemic to Mauritius and Réunion
