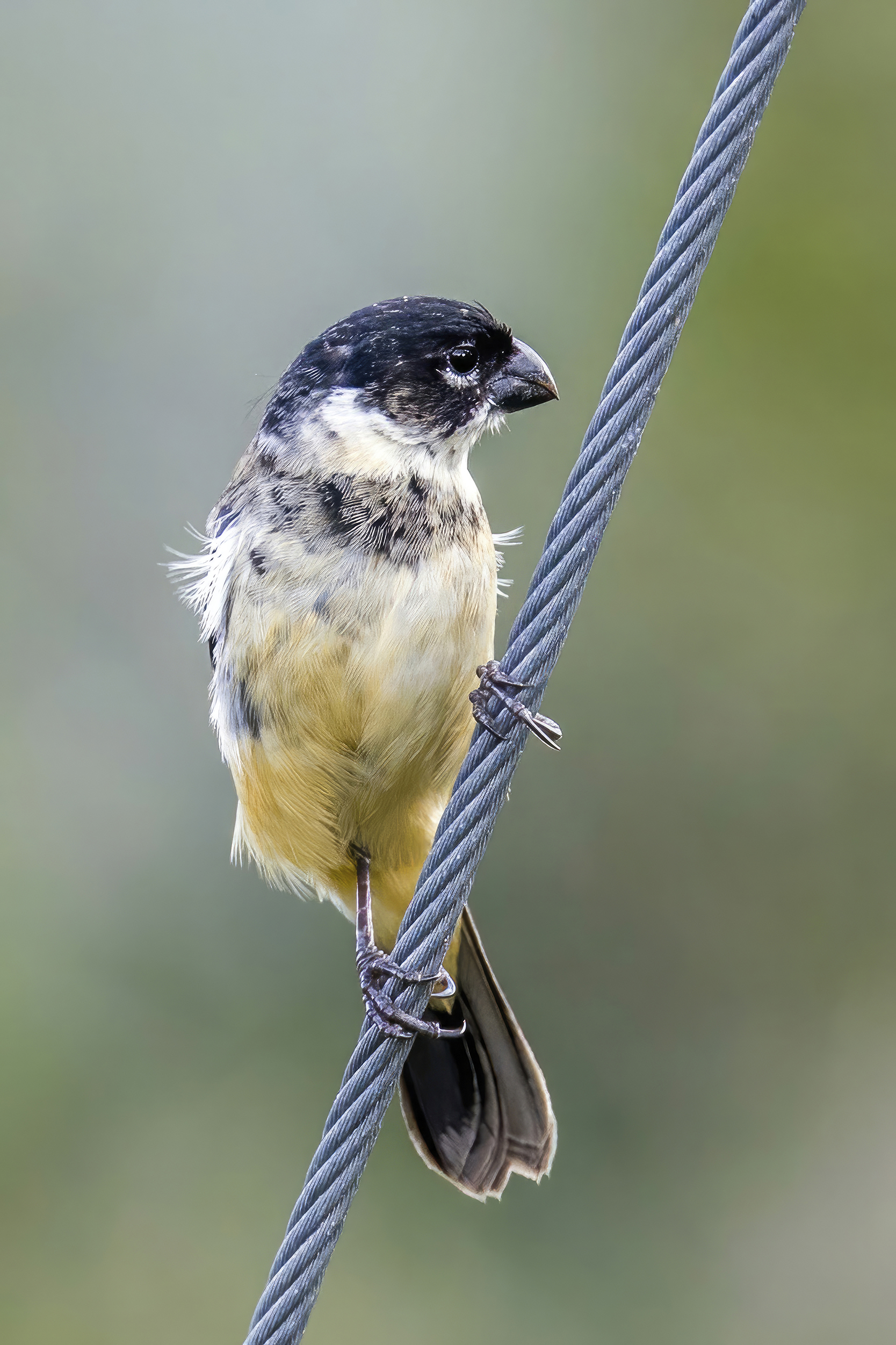
- S. m. morelleti Belize

Conservation status
- Least Concern (IUCN 3.1)

Scientific classification
- Kingdom: Animalia
- Phylum: Chordata
- Class: Aves
- Order: Passeriformes
- Family: Thraupidae
- Genus: Sporophila
- Species: S. morelleti

Binomial name
- Sporophila morelleti (Bonaparte, 1850)

= Morelet's seedeater =

Species of bird

Morelet's seedeater (Sporophila morelleti) is a species of bird in the family Thraupidae, the tanagers and allies. It is found from Texas to Panama.

== Taxonomy and systematics ==
Morelet's seedeater has a complicated taxonomic history. It was formally described by Charles Lucien Bonaparte in 1850 with the binomial Spermophila morelleti. Bonaparte misspelled the name of the collector he wished to honor, P. M. A. Morelet, when he created the specific epithet morelleti. By the principle of priority the misspelling remains. By 1938 it had been reassigned to the genus Sporophila as a subspecies of S. torqueola. At the time genus Sporophila was a member of the family Fringillidae. By 1970 Sporophila had been reassigned to the family Emberizidae. Based on studies published between 1988 and 2011, beginning in 2012 the genus was moved to its present position in the tanager family Thraupidae.

By 2012 S. torqueola had been assigned five subspecies and the English name "white-collared seedeater". Between 2016 and 2018 taxonomic systems split S. t. morelleti, S. t. sharpei, and S. t. mutanda from the other two as S. morelleti. The American Ornithological Society, the Clements taxonomy, and the IOC called the new species "Morelet's seedeater". However, BirdLife International's Handbook of the Birds of the World (HBW) confusingly calls it "white-collared seedeater", which had applied to S. torqueola. The systems renamed the "leftover" S. t. torqueola and S. t. atriceps the cinnamon-rumped seedeater. A study published in 2018 showed that Morelet's seedeater is more distantly related to the cinnamon-rumped seedeater than the latter is to other Sporophila seedeaters.

As of late 2025 the taxonomy of Morelet's seedeater remains unsettled. The IOC, HBW, and AviList assign it three subspecies, S. m. morelleti, S. m. sharpei, and S. m. mutanda. However, Clements does not recognize S. m. mutanda but includes it within S. m. morelleti.

This article follows the majority three-subspecies model.

== Description ==
Morelet's seedeater is about 11 cm (4.3 in) long and weighs an average of 8.7 g (0.31 oz). It has a short thick bill with a rounded culmen. The species is sexually dimorphic. Adult males of subspecies S. m. sharpei in breeding plumage have a blackish crown, nape, and sides of the head with a white crescent below the eye. Their back is olive-gray with scattered black mottling and their rump is paler and buffier. Their wings are black with white at the base of most primaries and two buffy white wing bars. Their tail is black with thin gray feather tips. Their throat and the sides of their neck are buffy white with a small amount of mottled black below the sides. The rest of their underparts are cinnamon buff to whitish buff. Adult females are mostly grayish olive to brownish olive. Their wings and tail are gray; the wings have no white on the primaries and the wing bars are thinner than the male's. Males of the nominate subspecies S. m. morelleti have a black crown, nape, and sides of the head with a larger white eye crescent than sharpei. They are solid black below the white sides of the neck and the color crosses the breast in a wide band below their white throat. S. m. mutanda is like morelleti but has a mostly black throat. The two females are like the sharpei female. Both sexes of all subspecies have a brown iris and gray legs. Males have a black bill and females a brown maxilla and a pale mandible.

== Distribution and habitat ==
The subspecies of Morelet's seedeater are found thus:

- S. m. sharpei: from the Lower Rio Grande Valley in far southern Texas, USA, south into northeastern Mexico through central Tamaulipas and eastern San Luis Potosí
- S. m. morelleti: from northern Veracruz in eastern Mexico south on the Gulf/Caribbean slope through most of Guatemala and Belize and then on both the Caribbean and Pacific slopes through Honduras, Nicaragua, and Costa Rica to western Panama's Bocas del Toro and Chiriquí provinces; also Mujeres, Cozumel, and Cancún islands
- S. m. mutanda: from southern Chiapas in southwestern Mexico south through western Guatemala and El Salvador.

Morelet's seedeater primarily inhabits open grassy areas such as pastures, roadsides, weedy agricultural fields, and grassy marshes. It is often found near water. In elevation it ranges from sea level to 2,000 m (6,600 ft).

== Behavior ==
=== Movement ===
Morelet's seedeater is mostly a sedentary year-round resident, though the population in Texas and nearby northern Mexico may withdraw south in winter.

=== Feeding ===
Morelet's seedeater feeds primarily on seeds, especially those of grasses, and adds insects to its diet during the breeding season. It usually plucks seeds while clinging to grass stems, though it will also pluck them while on the ground. It feeds in small groups throughout the year, and the groups often include other seed-eating species.

=== Breeding ===
Morelet's seedeater breeds between April and December, often rearing two or three broods. The female builds the nest, a cup made from a variety of plant fibers and spider web. It is typically in a shrub or tree up to about 3 m (10 ft) above the ground. The clutch is two to four eggs that are pale blue-gray with dark markings. The female alone incubates, for about 13 days. Fledging occurs 10 to 11 days after hatch. Both parents provision nestlings. Both the brown-headed cowbird (Molothrus ater) and bronzed cowbird (M. aeneus) are brood parasites.

=== Vocalization ===
The song of Morelet's seedeater is variously described as "wee wee wee, followed by a dry trill", "a pleasant and melodious swee swee swee, tee'ootee'oo", and "sweet, sweet, sweet, cheer, cheer followed by various trills".

== Status ==
The IUCN has assessed Morelet's seedeater as being of Least Concern. It has a very large range; its estimated population of at least 14 million mature individuals is believed to be increasing. No immediate threats have been identified. It is considered "rare and local" in Texas, "common" in northern Central America, and "fairly common" in Costa Rica.
