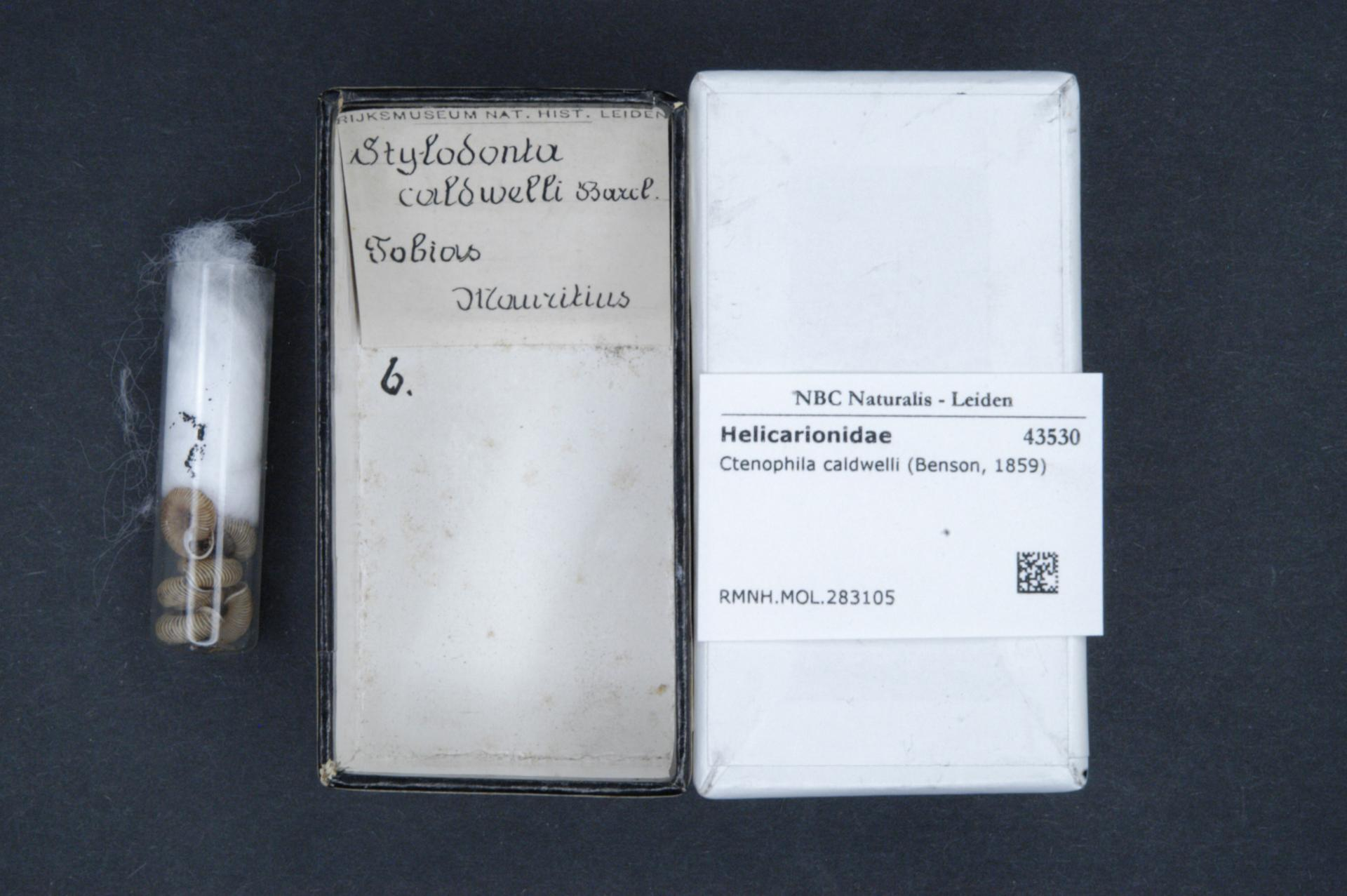

Conservation status
- Endangered (IUCN 2.3)

Scientific classification
- Kingdom: Animalia
- Phylum: Mollusca
- Class: Gastropoda
- Order: Stylommatophora
- Family: Helicarionidae
- Genus: Ctenophila
- Species: C. caldwelli

Binomial name
- Ctenophila caldwelli Benson, 1859

= Ctenophila caldwelli =

Species of gastropod

Ctenophila caldwelli is a species of small air-breathing land snail, terrestrial pulmonate gastropod mollusc in the family Euconulidae, the hive snails. This species is endemic to Mauritius.
