= Gonospira nevilli =

Conservation status
- Extinct (IUCN 3.1)

Scientific classification
- Kingdom: Animalia
- Phylum: Mollusca
- Class: Gastropoda
- Order: Stylommatophora
- Family: Streptaxidae
- Genus: Gonospira
- Species: †G. nevilli

Binomial name
- †Gonospira nevilli Adams, 1867

Synonyms
- Erepta nevilli H. Adams, 1867; Gibbus (Gibbulina) nevilli H. Adams, 1867 (basionym); Gibbus nevilli H. Adams, 1867 (original combination); Orthogibbus (Orthogibbus) nevilli (H. Adams, 1867)

Extinct species of gastropod

Gonospira nevilli is an extinct species of air-breathing land snail, terrestrial pulmonate gastropod mollusc in the family Streptaxidae.

This species was endemic to Mauritius. It is now extinct.
