= Dupontia levis =

Conservation status
- Vulnerable (IUCN 2.3)

Scientific classification
- Kingdom: Animalia
- Phylum: Mollusca
- Class: Gastropoda
- Order: Stylommatophora
- Family: Euconulidae
- Genus: Dupontia
- Species: D. levis

Binomial name
- Dupontia levis Godwin-Austen, 1908

Species of gastropod

Dupontia levis is a species of small air-breathing land snail, terrestrial pulmonate gastropod mollusk in the family Euconulidae, the hive snails. This species is endemic to Mauritius.
