= Dupontia (gastropod) =

Scientific classification
- Domain: Eukaryota
- Kingdom: Animalia
- Phylum: Mollusca
- Class: Gastropoda
- Order: Stylommatophora
- Family: Euconulidae
- Genus: Dupontia; Godwin-Austen, 1908

Genus of gastropods

Dupontia is a genus of small air-breathing land snails, terrestrial pulmonate gastropod mollusks in the family Euconulidae, the hive snails.

== Species ==
Species within the genus Dupontia include:

- Dupontia levis
- Dupontia nitella
- Dupontia perlucida
- Dupontia poweri
- Dupontia proletaria
