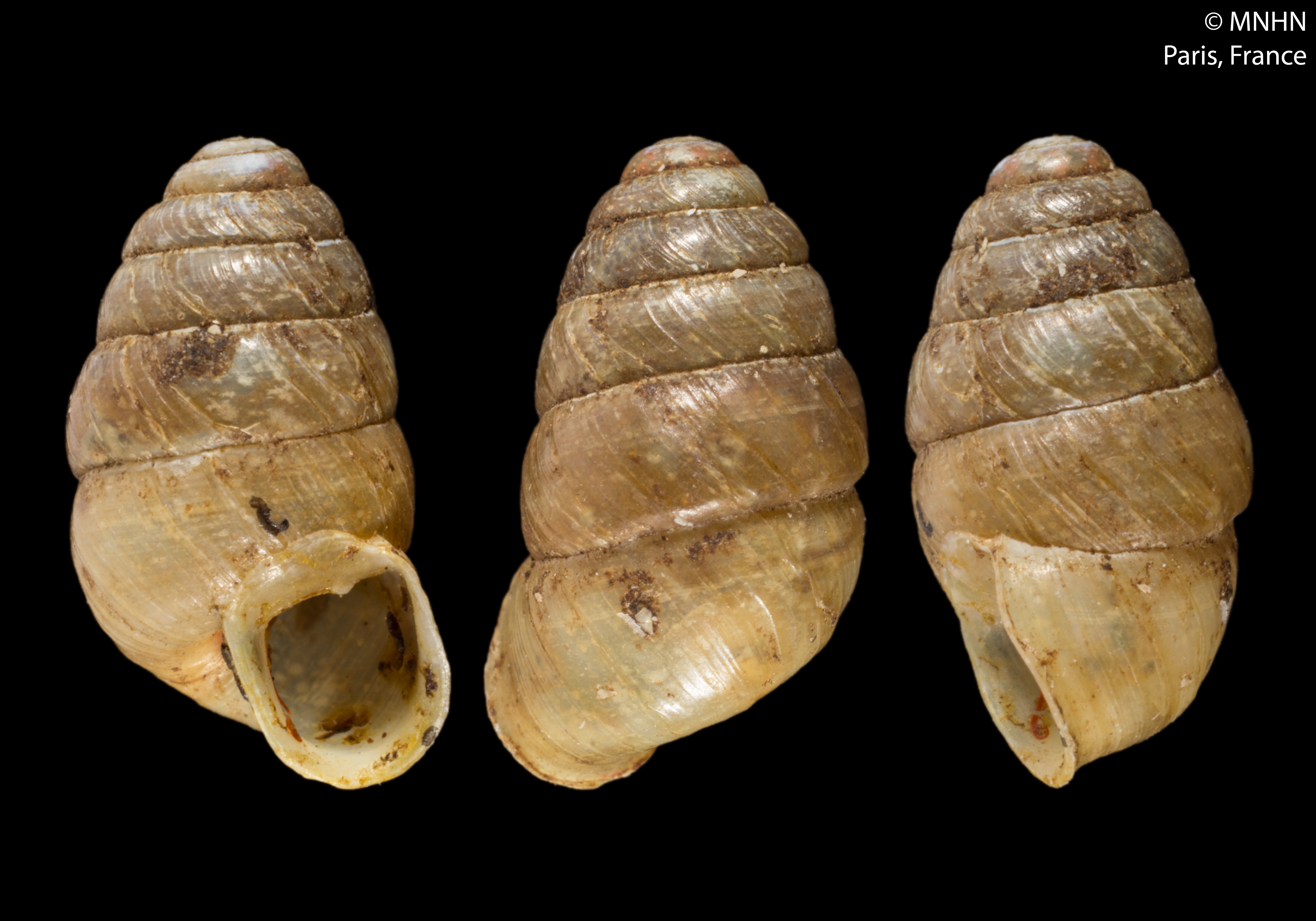
- Shell of Gonospira bourguignati (holotype at MNHN, Paris)

Conservation status
- Near Threatened (IUCN 2.3)

Scientific classification
- Kingdom: Animalia
- Phylum: Mollusca
- Class: Gastropoda
- Order: Stylommatophora
- Family: Streptaxidae
- Genus: Gonospira
- Species: G. bourguignati

Binomial name
- Gonospira bourguignati (Deshayes, 1863)

Synonyms
- Gibbus (Gibbulina) bourguignati (Deshayes, 1863) (superseded combination); Gibbus (Gibbulina) intersecta (Deshayes, 1863) (superseded combination); Orthogibbus (Orthogibbus) bourguignati (Deshayes, 1863); Orthogibbus (Orthogibbus) bourguignati var. intersecta (Deshayes, 1863); Pupa bourguignati Deshayes, 1863 (original combination); Pupa intersecta Deshayes, 1863

= Gonospira bourguignati =

Species of gastropod

Gonospira bourguignati is a species of air-breathing land snail, terrestrial pulmonate gastropod mollusk in the family Streptaxidae.

== Description ==
The length of the shell attains 9 mm.

== Distribution ==
This species is endemic to Réunion, an island located in the Indian Ocean, east of Madagascar.
