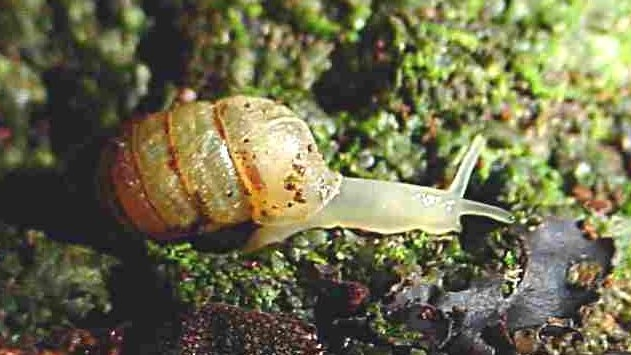
- A live individual of Gonospira uvula

Conservation status
- Endangered (IUCN 2.3)

Scientific classification
- Kingdom: Animalia
- Phylum: Mollusca
- Class: Gastropoda
- Order: Stylommatophora
- Family: Streptaxidae
- Genus: Gonospira
- Species: G. uvula

Binomial name
- Gonospira uvula Deshayes, 1863

Synonyms
- Gibbus (Gibbulina) uvula (Deshayes, 1863) (superseded combination); Orthogibbus (Gibbulinopsis) uvulus (Deshayes, 1863); Pupa canaliculata Crosse, 1863; Pupa uvula Deshayes, 1863 (original combination)

= Gonospira uvula =

Species of gastropod

Gonospira uvula is a species of small air-breathing land snail, terrestrial pulmonate gastropod mollusk in the family Streptaxidae.

== Distribution ==
This species is endemic to Réunion.
