= Pierre Marie Arthur Morelet =

French naturalist

- Born: 26 August 1809; Lays, Doubs, France
- Died: 9 October 1892 (aged 83); Dijon, France
- Occupation: Naturalist
- Spouse: Noémie de Folin

Pierre Marie Arthur Morelet (26 August 1809 – 9 October 1892) was a French naturalist, born in Lays, Doubs. He was a member of the commission to Algeria, primarily as a natural artist, drawing any natural findings. He collected specimens in the Canary Islands, Guatemala and Mexico.

He had a particular interest in molluscs and was recognised as a leading expert in the field.

Morelet married Noémie de Folin, sister of Léopold de Folin. Morelet died of natural causes in 1892, in Dijon.

== Taxa described ==
Morelet described various taxa, including:

- Cyclophorus horridulum (Morelet, 1882) – a species of land snail
- Crocodylus moreletii (Morelet, 1850) – a crocodile

== Taxa named in his honour ==
Taxa named in honour of Arthur Morelet include:

- Agalychnis moreletii (A.M.C. Duméril, 1853) – Morelet's Treefrog
- Crocodylus moreletii (A.H.A. Duméril & Bibron, 1851) – Morelet's Crocodile
- Mesaspis moreletii (Bocourt, 1871) – Morelet's alligator lizard
- Ommatoiulus moreletii (Lucas, 1860) – Portuguese millipede
- Sporophila morelleti (Bonaparte, 1850) – Morelet's seedeater

Gastropods:

- Clavator moreleti Crosse & Fischer, 1868
- Conus moreleti Crosse, 1858
- Edentulina moreleti (Adams, 1868)
- Leidyula moreleti (Fischer, 1871)
- Letourneuxia moreleti (P. Hesse, 1884)
- Onoba moreleti Dautzenberg, 1889
- Patella moreleti Drouet, 1858

== Bibliography ==
- Morelet A. (1845). Description des mollusques terrestres et fluviatiles du Portugal. pp. [1–3], I–VII, 1–116, Pl. I–XIV. Paris. (Bailliere). scan
- Morelet A. (1860). Iles Açores. Notice sur l'histoire naturelle des Açores suivie d'une description des mollusques terrestres de cet archipel. scan
