= Snails as food =

Human consumption of snails

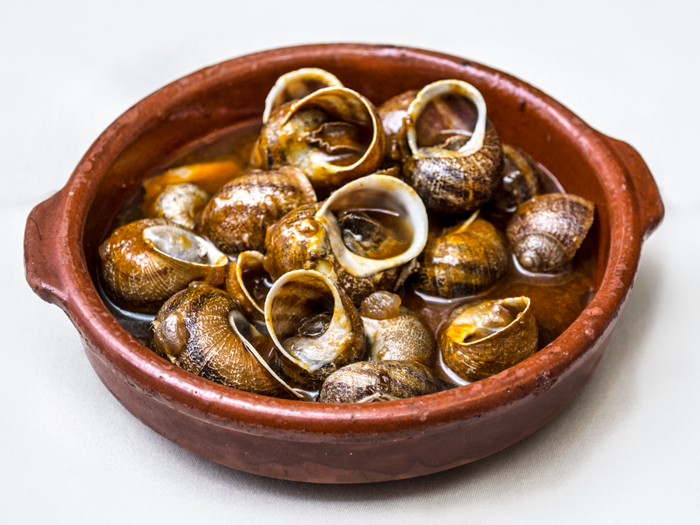
Snail dish from Toledo, Spain

Snails are eaten by humans in many areas such as Africa, Southeast Asia and Mediterranean Europe, while in other cultures, snails are seen as a taboo food. Borrowed from the French word for 'snail', the term escargot is what English speakers use to specifically denote edible land snails. Snails as a food date back to ancient times, with numerous cultures worldwide having traditions and practices that attest to their consumption. In the modern era snails are farmed, an industry known as heliciculture.

The snails are collected after the rains and are put to "purge" (fasting). In the past, the consumption of snails had a marked seasonality, from April to June. Now, snail-breeding techniques make them available all year. Heliciculture occurs mainly in Spain, France, and Italy, which are also the countries with the greatest culinary tradition of the snail. Although throughout history the snail has had little value in the kitchen because it is considered "poverty food", in recent times it can be classified as a delicacy thanks to the appreciation given to it by haute cuisine chefs.

== Etymology of escargot ==
Escargot, French pronunciation: [ɛskaʁɡo], comes from the French term for snail. Usage of the French word "escargot" dates back to 1892. The French word, first recorded in the 14th century, derives from escaragol (Provençal) and then escargol (Old French). It ultimately traces back through Vulgar Latin coculium and Classical Latin conchylium to the Ancient Greek konchylion (κογχύλιον), which meant "edible shellfish, oyster". The Online Etymological Dictionary note that the form of the word in Provençal and French seems to have been influenced by words related to the scarab.

== History ==
Researchers have not been able to pinpoint when humans began consuming snails, although archaeological discoveries point to earlier stages than the invention of hunting. A lot of broken snail shells have been found in the Franchthi Cave, in the Greek Argolis, from the year 10,700 BCE. In Historia de gastronomía (2004), Fernández-Armesto points out the possible reasons: snails are easy to handle, and their cultivation "seems like a natural extension of harvesting".

It is difficult to go beyond the limits of a developmentalist and progressive model of the history of food, according to which it is unthinkable that no food was cultivated in such early times, but snail farming is so simple, requires so little technical effort and is conceptually so close to harvesting methods, that it seems doctrinaire to the point of stubbornness to exclude such a possibility.

– Felipe Fernández-Armesto.

Many sites in the Zagros Mountains of Iraq and the Kermanshah region of western Iran are from the late Pleistocene and include snail shells that have been interpreted as food debris. Specifically, these species were mainly Helix salomonica or Levantina spiriplana. The deposits with snails from the ancient Capsian culture (present-day Tunisia) are of notable importance, as well as those found in the Cantabrian Mountains, the Pyrenees and the northern Adriatic (present-day Croatia and Slovenia), in addition to many other remains of snails throughout the Mediterranean Basin. The most convincing evidence for prehistoric land snail consumption is found in the Maghreb, beginning in the Iberomaurusian (20,000 BP) and continuing through the Capsian to at least 6,000 BP. Outside the Mediterranean region, the occurrence of land snails as food debris is less common. According to Lubell (2004b), archaeological remains of land snails have been found in the Caribbean, Peru, Texas and other parts of North America, East Africa, Sudan, Nigeria, and the Philippines. Also, archaeological remains of freshwater snails have been found in Yunnan.

A snail sauce is mentioned in the Book of Rites, a Confucian text of ancient China.

=== Ancient Rome ===
The Romans considered escargots an elite food, as noted in the writings of Pliny the Elder. The Roman breeder Quintus Fulvius Lippinus is considered the "father" of heliciculture, or at least, the first written reference to snail farms. Lippinus established his study center in the Tuscan city of Tarquinia to feasibly domesticate various animals, such as dormouse and wild boar, among many others. However, he was best known for his enormous snails, of which he had several species brought from Illyria to Africa. With a fatty diet he devised to fatten them, he obtained large quantities of snails, which he then marketed in Rome. His snails set the trend among the Roman upper class, and the practice became popular. Lippinus was an innovator who managed a large company that marketed his snails beyond the Mare Nostrum. (Note: The story of Fulvius Lippinus is documented in the Rerum rusticarum libri III (chapters XII and XIV) by Marcus Terentius Varro, and a century later in the Naturalis Historia (books VIII and IX) by Pliny the Elder.) In De re coquinaria, one of the complete Roman cookbooks, four recipes based on snails are mentioned. Shells of the edible species Cernuella virgata and Otala lactea have been recovered from the Roman-era city Volubilis, in present-day Morocco. They are a harbinger of the escargot found in modern souks of the country.

=== Modern Age ===
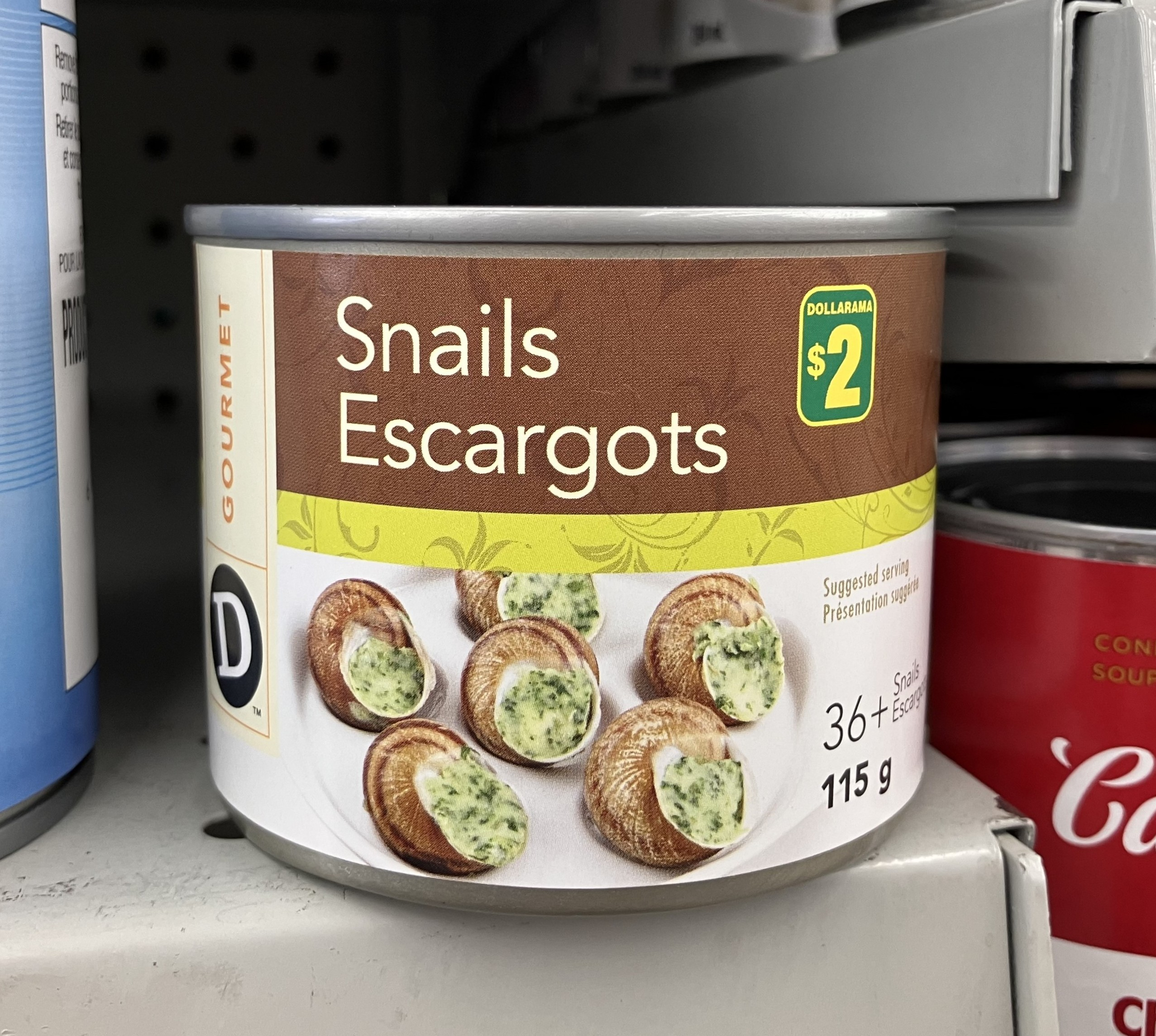
In the 21st century, snails can be found in canned form.

Pope Pius V, who was an avid eater of snails, decided that they had to be considered as fish to continue eating them during Lent, exclaiming: Estote pisces in aeternum! ("You will be fish forever!") In Spain, the custom continued, as can be seen in the gastronomic literature of that time. In the Libro del arte de cozina by Diego Granado, head chef of the Spanish royal household, a section was dedicated to the snail, explaining its biological characteristics, how to clean it, and various recipes on how to cook it, fry it, etc. This book was published in 1614 in Lleida, a city in western Catalonia famous for its culinary tradition of the snail.

In the stricter Orthodox Church tradition of fasting, snails are still considered fully Lenten, being invertebrates, and are historically and presently popular.

== Species ==
Not all land snails are edible since many are too small—not worthwhile to prepare and cook—and the palatability of the flesh varies among species.

From the genus Helix:

- Helix lucorum, European snail
- Helix pomatia, Roman snail or Burgundy escargot, is the most consumed species in France
- Helix salomonica

From the family Achatinidae:

- Lissachatina fulica (formerly Achatina fulica), giant African snail, is very popular.

From the genus Cepaea:

- Cepaea nemoralis, grove snail, known as rayado ('striped' snail) in Spain
- Cepaea hortensis, white-lipped snail

From the genus Otala:

- Otala punctata, known as cabrilla in Spain, are bigger
- Otala lactea, Spanish snail

From the genus Pomacea:

- Pomacea canaliculata, apple snail, although native to South America, is widely consumed in Asia and is considered a highly invasive species
- Pomacea urceus, in Colombia and Venezuela, where it originates, is known as guarura

Others:

- Buccinum undatum, common whelk
- Cantareus apertus (formerly Helix aperta), garden snail
- Cornu aspersum (formerly Helix aspersa), common or garden snail, known as petit-gris in France
- Elona quimperiana, known as Escargot de Quimper in France and caracol moteado in the north of Spain
- Littorina littorea, common periwinkle
- Pachychilus spp. are consumed as food amongst the Maya
- Ryssota ovum, endemic to the Philippines and known locally as buko or bayuko
- Thetystrombus latus, known as bilolá in Fang, kolobwidjo in Yoruba and búzio cabra in Cape Verdean Portuguese

== Nutrition ==
Nutritional value per
- Energy: 377 kJ (90 kcal)
- Carbohydrates: 2
- Sugars: 0
- Dietary fibre: --
- Fat: 1.4
- Protein: 16.1
Vitamins and minerals
Vitamins	Quantity %DV^{†}
Vitamin A equiv.	11% 100 μg
Thiamine (B1)	1% 0.01 mg
Riboflavin (B2)	9% 0.12 mg
Niacin (B3)	9% 1.4 mg
Vitamin B6	8% 0.13 mg
Vitamin B12	21% 0.5 μg
Vitamin C	0% 0 mg
Vitamin D	0% 0 IU
Vitamin E	33% 5 mg
Vitamin K	0% 0.1 μg
Minerals	Quantity %DV^{†}
Calcium	1% 10 mg
Copper	44% 0.4 mg
Iron	19% 3.5 mg
Magnesium	60% 250 mg
Phosphorus	22% 272 mg
Potassium	13% 382 mg
Selenium	50% 27.4 μg
Sodium	3% 70 mg
Zinc	9% 1 mg
- Other constituents: Quantity
- Water: 79.2
- ^{†}Percentages estimated using US recommendations for adults, except for potassium, which is estimated based on expert recommendation from the National Academies.

Snail meat has several benefits compared to other meats, highlighting its low calorie and fat content. It is a source of protein (between 10 and 19%). Nutritional information can vary depending on the snail species and on who performs the nutritional analysis. (Note: The nutritional information from the USDA database is shown in the nutritional table (it does not indicate which species of snail). Compare to "Calories in Snails (100 g) and Nutrition Facts". FatSecret. (species not indicated). A second USDA study, with different data and without indicating the species, can be consulted here: «Snails, cooked, NS as to cooking method». USDA. And as a reference for this article, the Spanish Ministry of Food data is taken, see Fundación Española de la Nutrición (2019).) Even so, it can be said that snails are rich in inorganic nutrients: 82% water, minerals such as magnesium and iron (mainly, but also calcium, phosphorus, potassium, and sodium), in addition to a high percentage of niacin (vitamin B3), since for every 100 g of snail meat, up to 55% of the DRI (in women) and 41% DRI (in men). Snails are a good source of selenium. Of the recommended daily requirement of selenium, the snail provides up to 50% (in women) and 30% (in men).

Snail flesh is a good supply of essential amino acids such as lysine, methionine, and cysteine, which are difficult to get in other sources of protein, according to Adeyeye et al. (2020). Scientists also point out that a variety of vitamins, including vitamins A, E, and B12, are present in snail meat and are crucial for maintaining general health and wellbeing.

Due to high iron content, snails are recommended for consumption by people suffering from iron-deficiency anemia. The fat content is low, but provides beneficial omega-3 fatty acids.

== Culinary use ==
=== Cleaning ===
Before use in the kitchen, snails must be cleaned to remove impurities. The cleaning process (called purgado in Spanish) consists of leaving them alive for several days without eating, or only eating flour. The flour method is a homemade resource to clean the animal's digestive tract. Formerly in Spain, snails were hung from mesh bags from which they could not escape. Snail chef Morell i Bitrià (1999) recommends not giving them anything to eat for at least eight days (ideally ten or twelve) and then washing them well. Snails that die during the purging process should be disposed of.

=== Preparation ===
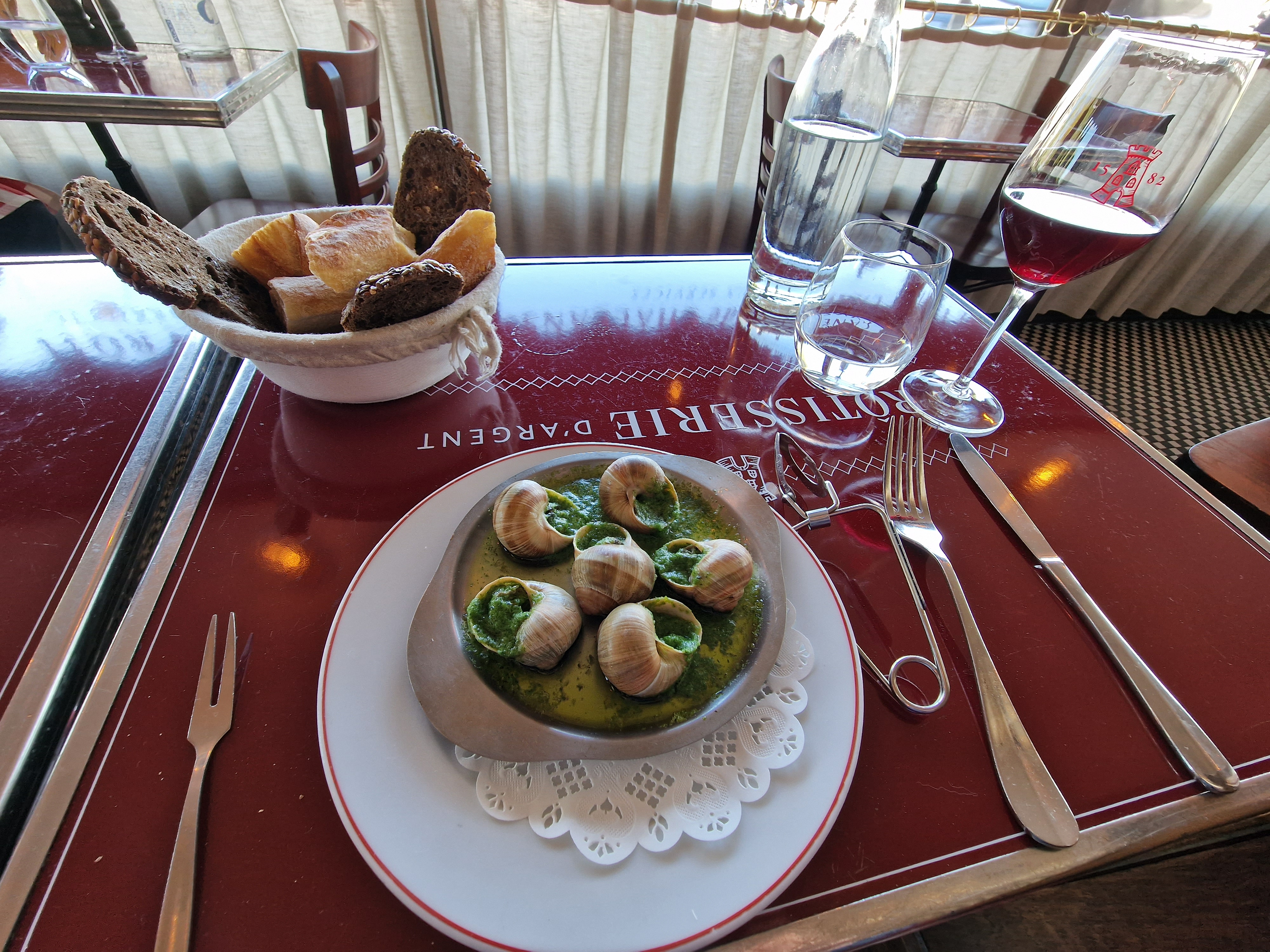
Eating escargots (snails) in France, a classic French delicacy

Snail slime should be removed with as many washes of water as possible, in a colander under running water or in a saucepan. Again they are washed, this time with salt water, which helps cut through the slime. This procedure can cause a great deal of pain for the snail. After being cleaned and washed several times, they are transferred to a pot with cold water and salt, when they emerge from their shells the heat is raised to the maximum, and they are cooked for approximately a quarter of an hour. After this, they are served in the chosen stew, sauce, or other recipe. This intermediate action is popularly known as "cheating" (engañar) the snail in Spain, as they come out of their shells once the water heats up, and when they're outside the flame is increased further to rapidly heat the water and kill the snails.

=== Consumption ===
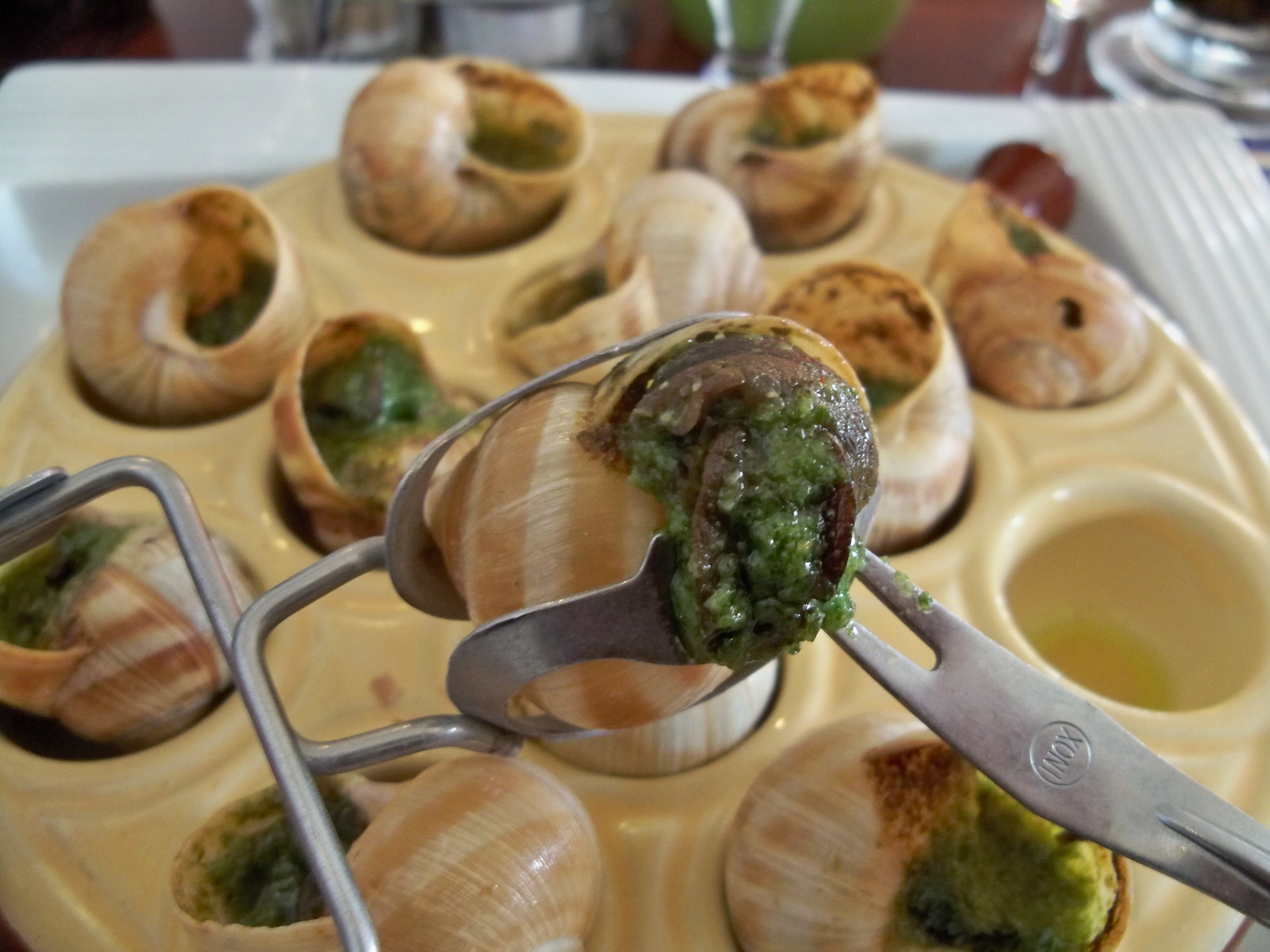
In haute cuisine, it is customary to serve snails with pince à escargot and fourchette à escargot.

In bars where snails are offered as a tapa, it is common for them to be served with toothpicks, as this is the typical rustic utensil for eating snails. A serving commonly ranges between 25 and 30 snails. In haute cuisine-style catering, snails are consumed by grasping the shell with a pince à escargot and extracting the snail with a fork called fourchette à escargot.

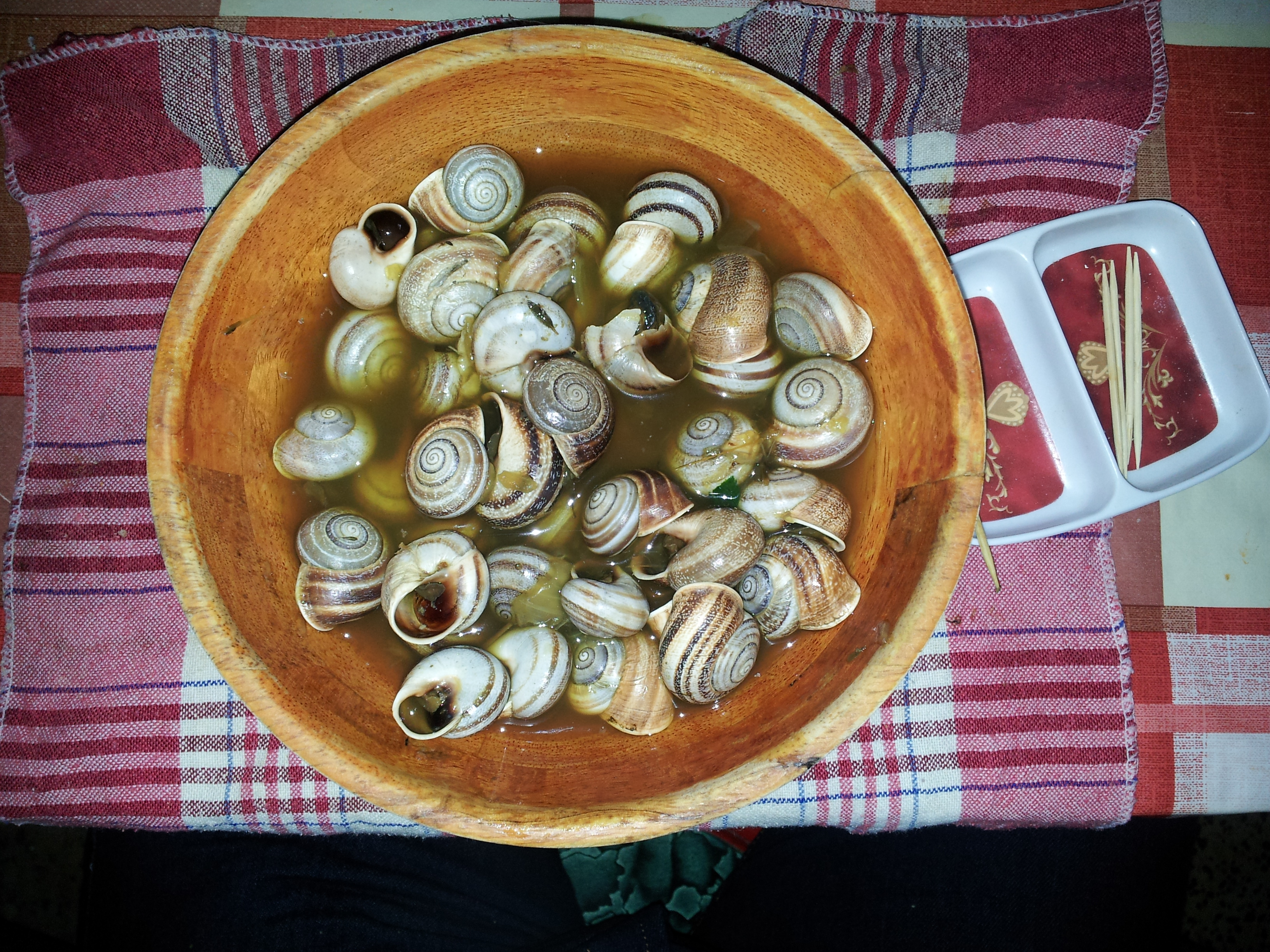
Escargot food from Algeria

On a culinary level, they can be cooked in many ways: stews, baked, a la gormanta, a la brutesque. In the cuisine of Lleida, they are an ingredient in many traditional dishes, in many cases mixed with other meats such as pig's feet, rabbit, chicken, lobsters and prawns, etc.

== By region ==
=== Sub-Saharan Africa ===
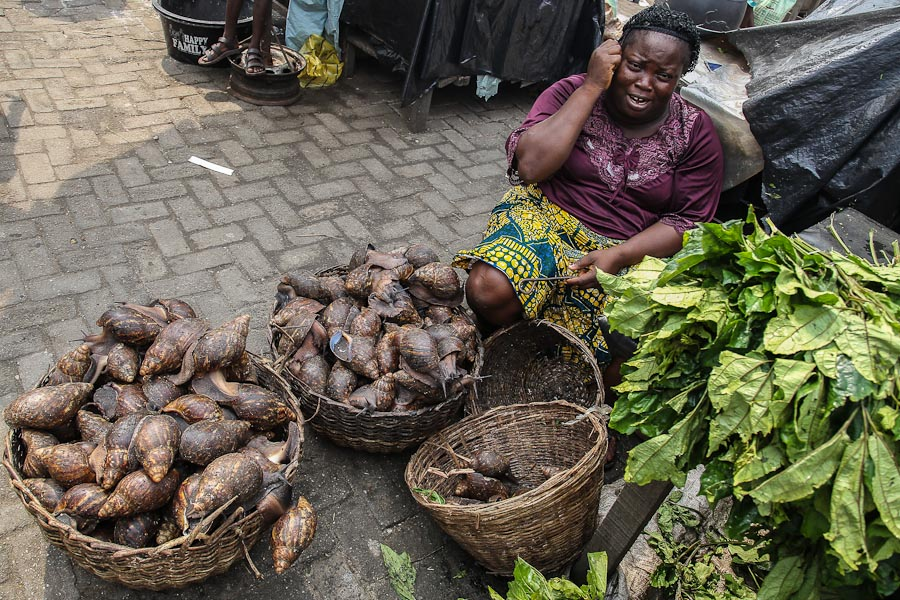
Seller of snails in Nigeria

People in Cameroon, Ghana, Nigeria, and other countries in the area are used to eating African varieties of snail, which are larger. Typical of Equatorial Guinea is a giant sea snail called bilolá (Thetystrombus latus), eaten stewed or sautéed, which in Cape Verde is known as búzio cabra, and is grilled on skewers. It is also known as ìgbín amongst the Yoruba of western Nigeria.

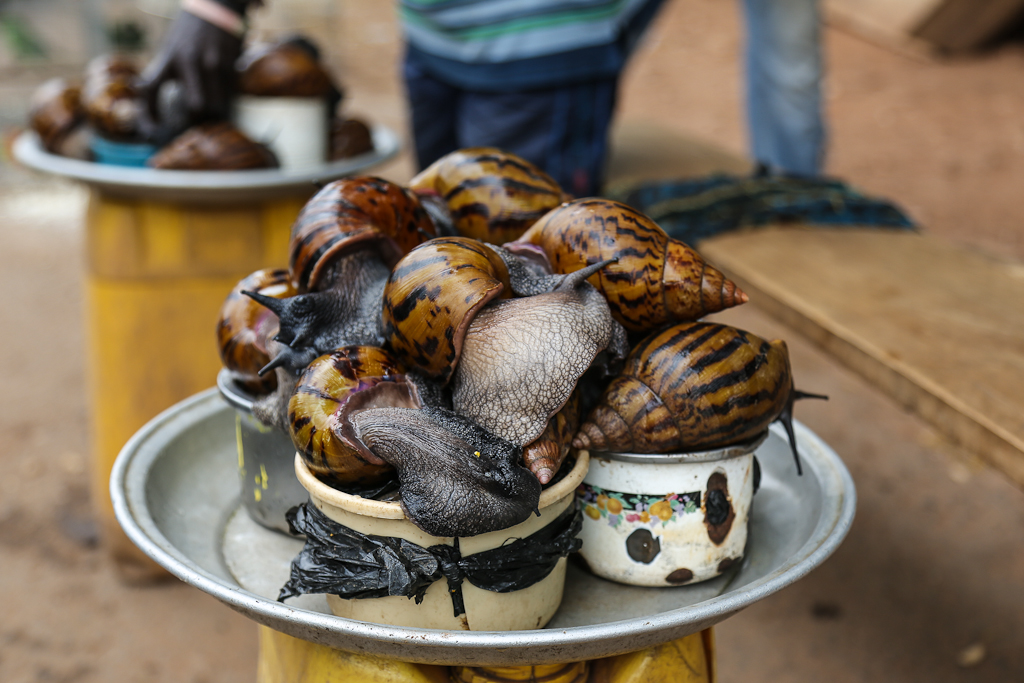
Ghana snail

=== Mediterranean Basin ===
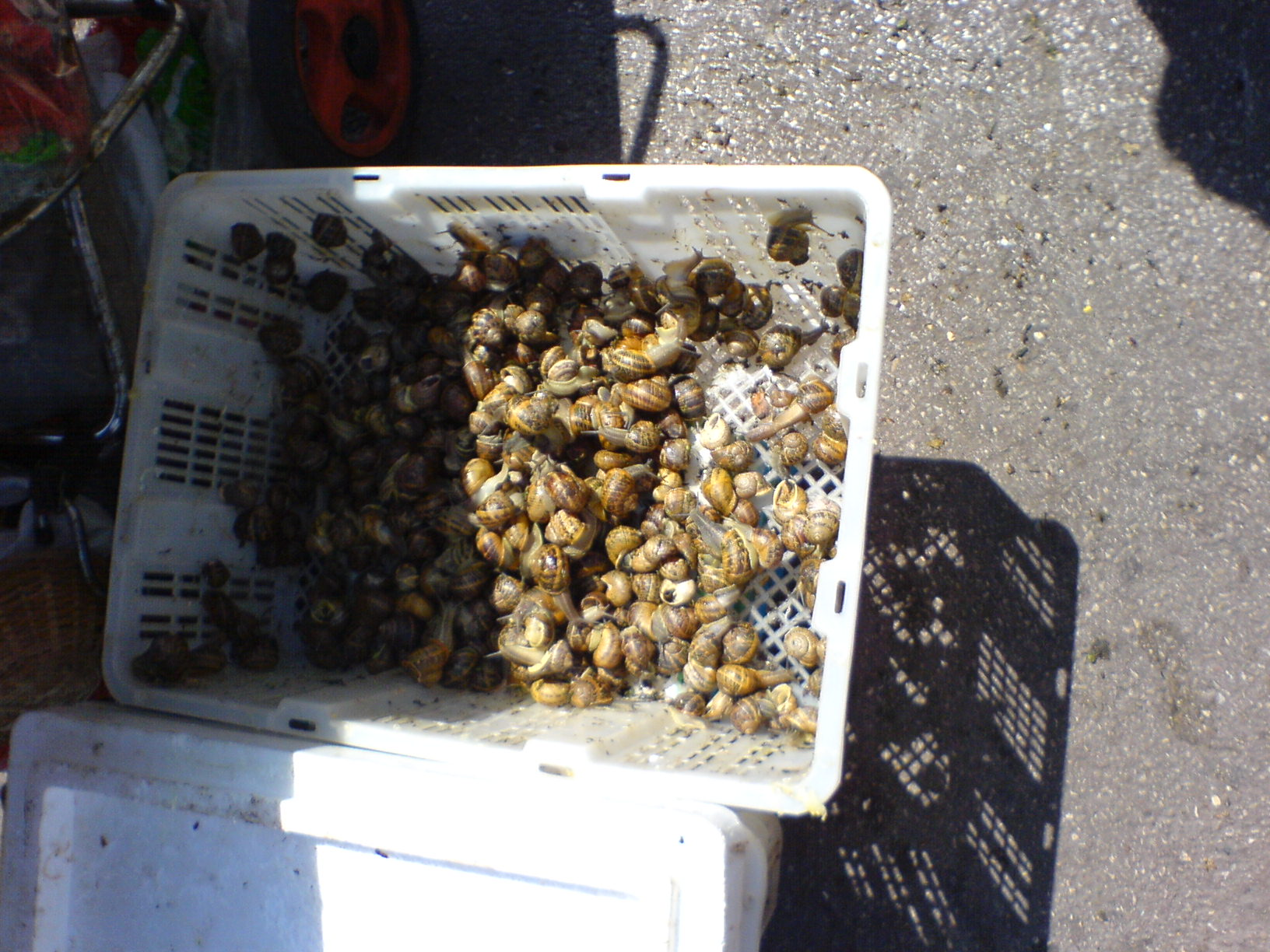
Live snails for sale in a market in France

There is a tradition of consuming snails in Andorra, Spain, France, Italy, and Portugal on the European side and Algeria, Morocco, and Tunisia on the African side. Cornu aspersum is the most widespread species in the Mediterranean basin, the Iberian Peninsula, and the French Atlantic coast.

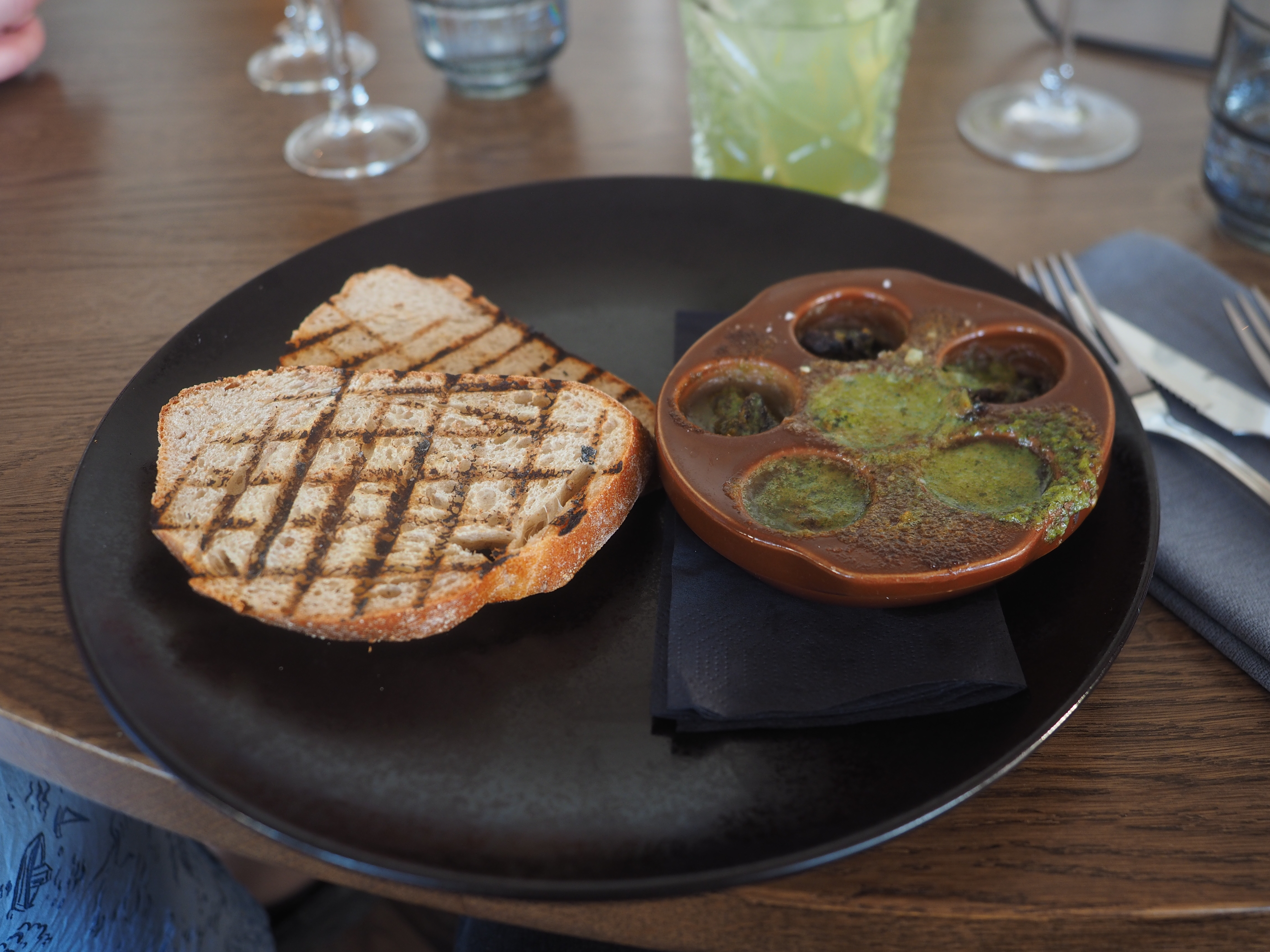
French-style escargot with herb butter along with grilled sourdough bread

In French cuisine, snails are typically purged, killed, shelled, and cooked (usually with garlic butter, chicken stock or wine), and then placed back into the shells with the butter sauce and additional ingredients, such as garlic, thyme, parsley, or pine nuts. Special tongs for holding the shell and forks for extracting the meat are typically provided. Escargot is served on indented metal trays with places for six or 12 snails.

In Cretan cuisine, the snails are first boiled in white wine with bay leaves, celery, and onion and then coated with flour and fried with rosemary and vinegar.

In Maltese cuisine, snails (Maltese: bebbux) of the petit gris variety are simmered in red wine or ale with mint, basil and marjoram. The snails are cooked and served in their shells.

In Lebanon, land snails are collected from the mountains and then served alongside a tahini-based sauce called tarator in a dish called bzeh ma' tarator (Levantine Arabic: بزاق مع طراطور).

In Palestine, land snails are gathered similar to Lebanon, and often sold in markets. They are eaten by Palestinian Christians but are less popular among Muslims because most scholars of the Hanafi school predominant in the Levant rule out land snails as forbidden to eat under Islamic dietary laws, only permitting sea snails. Under Jewish dietary law, both land and sea snails are forbidden and are therefore not popular among Jewish or Palestinian citizens in Israel.

In Moroccan cuisine, snails, also called ghlal, are a popular street food. They are cooked in a jar filled with hot water, special spices, and herbs. After cooking, Moroccan snails are served in small bowls with broth and consumed hot. Moroccan snails are mostly enjoyed during winter as they are believed to be beneficial for health, especially when dealing with the common cold or rheumatism.

A city known for its snail culture is the town of Lleida, in the north-Spanish region of Catalonia, where the L'Aplec del Cargol festival has been held since 1980, receiving some 300,000 visitors during a weekend in May.

Snails were eaten periodically in Central Europe sometimes, as food or medicine. In Hungary they were used in Bereg, Ormánság, and Szilágyság (in the latter by the Romani people as medicine against labour pains).

=== Southeast Asia ===
Snails (balitong, bayuko, siput sedut, heong lor, etc.) are consumed in Cambodia, the Philippines, Indonesia, Laos, Malaysia, Thailand, and Vietnam.

In Indonesia, snails from the rice fields are fried on satay (skewers), a dish known as sate bekicot, sate keong, sate kakul, or grilled Tondano's sate kolombi.

In Banten, Jakarta, and West Java, snails from the rice fields are called tutut and are eaten with various sauces and curries.

=== South Asia ===
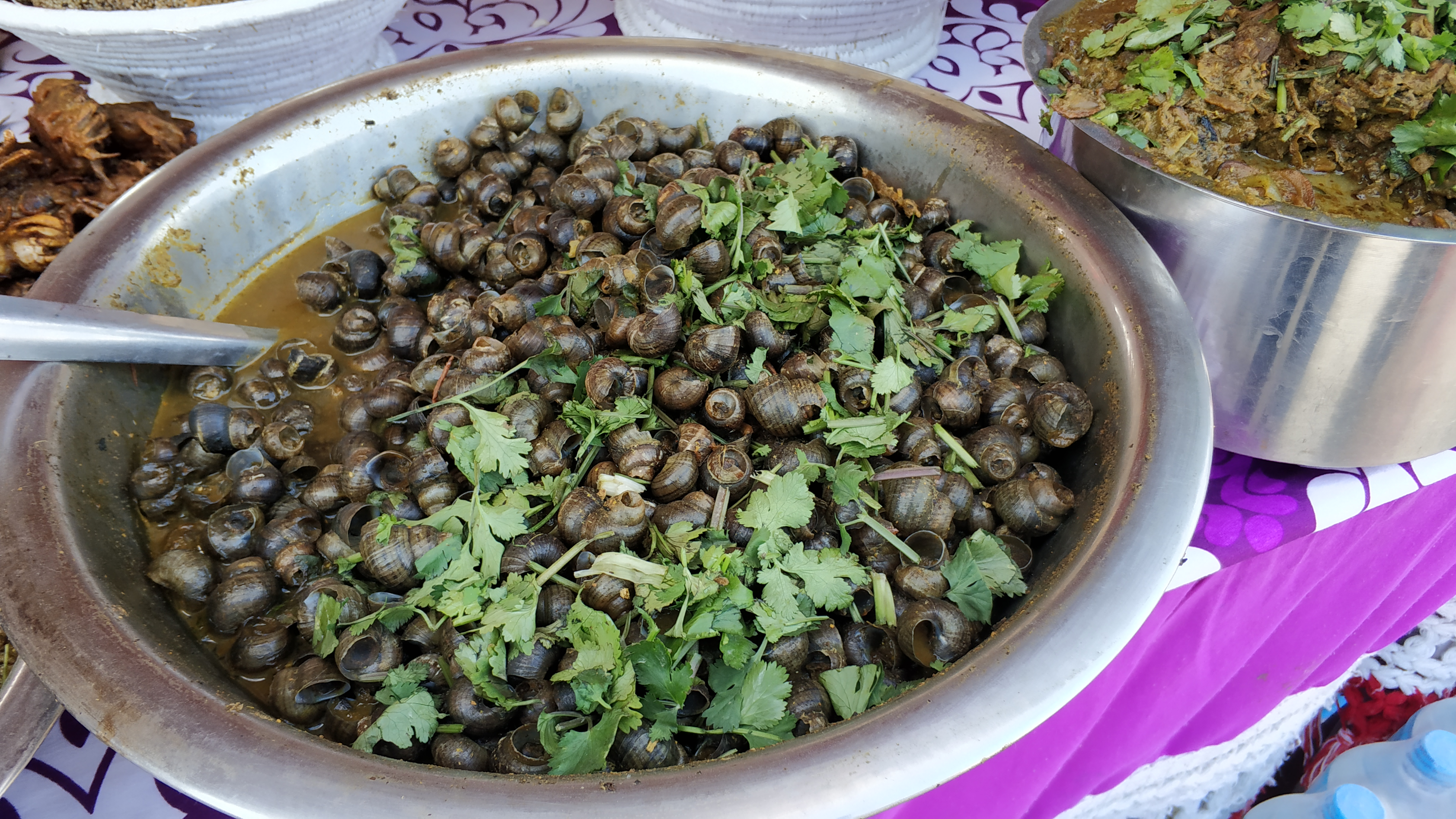
Ghonghi, fresh water snails by Tharu community of Nepal

Ghonghi is commonly consumed in the Terai region in Nepal. Ghongis are served with rice and have been a staple food of the indigenous people of Terai for ages.

Snails are eaten in Northeast India in the states of Manipur, Tripura and Nagaland. In Nagaland, snails are prepared with axone and pork meat, especially fats. Locally, it is called hamok. In Manipuri cuisine, they are called Tharoi thongba.

In North India, they are consumed in the states of Uttar Pradesh and Bihar. In Bihar, especially in the Mithila region, they are called doka. At other places in Bihar and eastern Uttar Pradesh, they are called ainthi. They are boiled and the meat is extracted to cook a curry, typically eaten with rice.

In Bengal, snails are commonly eaten as a delicacy and are called geri gugli. Since they are widely available and low in cost, they are called 'poor man's food'.

=== Other regions ===
- A growing demand in South America, in particular, Argentina, Chile, Peru, and Uruguay.
- Snails are consumed by the Romani people in Europe. Snail soup is a Romani delicacy.

== See also ==
- Jellyfish as food
- Snail caviar
