= Heliciculture =

Snail farming

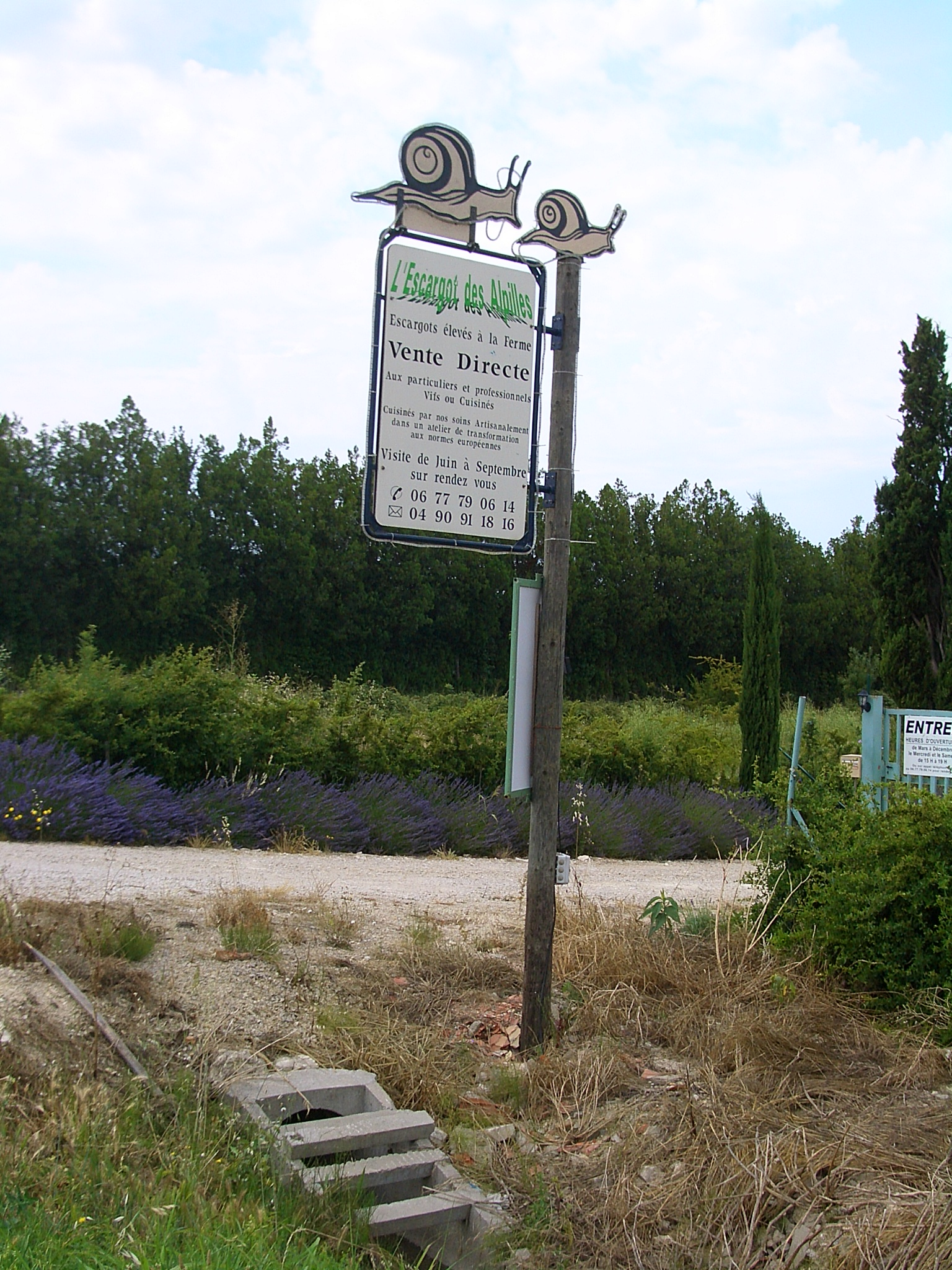
A snail farm near Eyragues, Provence, France

Heliciculture, commonly known as snail farming, is the process of raising edible land snails, primarily for human consumption or cosmetic use. The meat and snail eggs can be consumed as escargot and as a type of caviar, respectively.

Perhaps the best-known edible land snail species in the Western world is Helix pomatia, commonly known as the Roman snail or the Burgundy snail. This species, however, is not fit for profitable snail farming, and is normally harvested from nature.

Commercial snail farming in the Western world typically utilizes snails in the family Helicidae, particularly Cornu aspersum (morphotypically divided into C. a. aspersa and C. a. maxima), formerly known as Helix aspersa. In tropical climates, snail farming is typically done with the African snail. Snail meat from the African snail is highly valued and widely consumed. The term 'heliciculture' is used for raising snails for any commercial purpose, but generally refers to farming snails for escargot and cosmetic applications. It can also refer to cultivation of sea snails, such as whelks.

== History ==
Roasted snail shells have been found in archaeological excavations, an indication that snails have been eaten since prehistoric times.

Lumaca romana, (translation: Roman snail), was an ancient method of snail farming or heliciculture in the region about Tarquinia. This snail-farming method was described by Fulvius Lippinus (49 BC) and mentioned by Marcus Terentius Varro in De Re rustica III, 12. The snails were fattened for human consumption using spelt and aromatic herbs. People usually raised snails in pens near their houses, and these pens were called "cochlea".

The Romans, in particular, are known to have considered escargot as an elite food, as noted in the writings of Pliny the Elder. The Romans selected the best snails for breeding. Fulvius Lippinus started this practice. Various species were consumed by the Romans. Shells of the edible land snail species Otala lactea have been recovered in archaeological excavations of Volubilis in present-day Morocco.

"Wallfish" were also often eaten in Britain, but were never as popular as on the continent. There, people often ate snails during Lent, and in a few places, they consumed large quantities of snails at Mardi Gras or Carnival, prior to Lent.

According to some sources, the French exported brown garden snails to California in the 1850s, raising them as the delicacy escargot. Other sources claim that Italian immigrants were the first to bring the snail to the United States.

== Edible land snail species ==
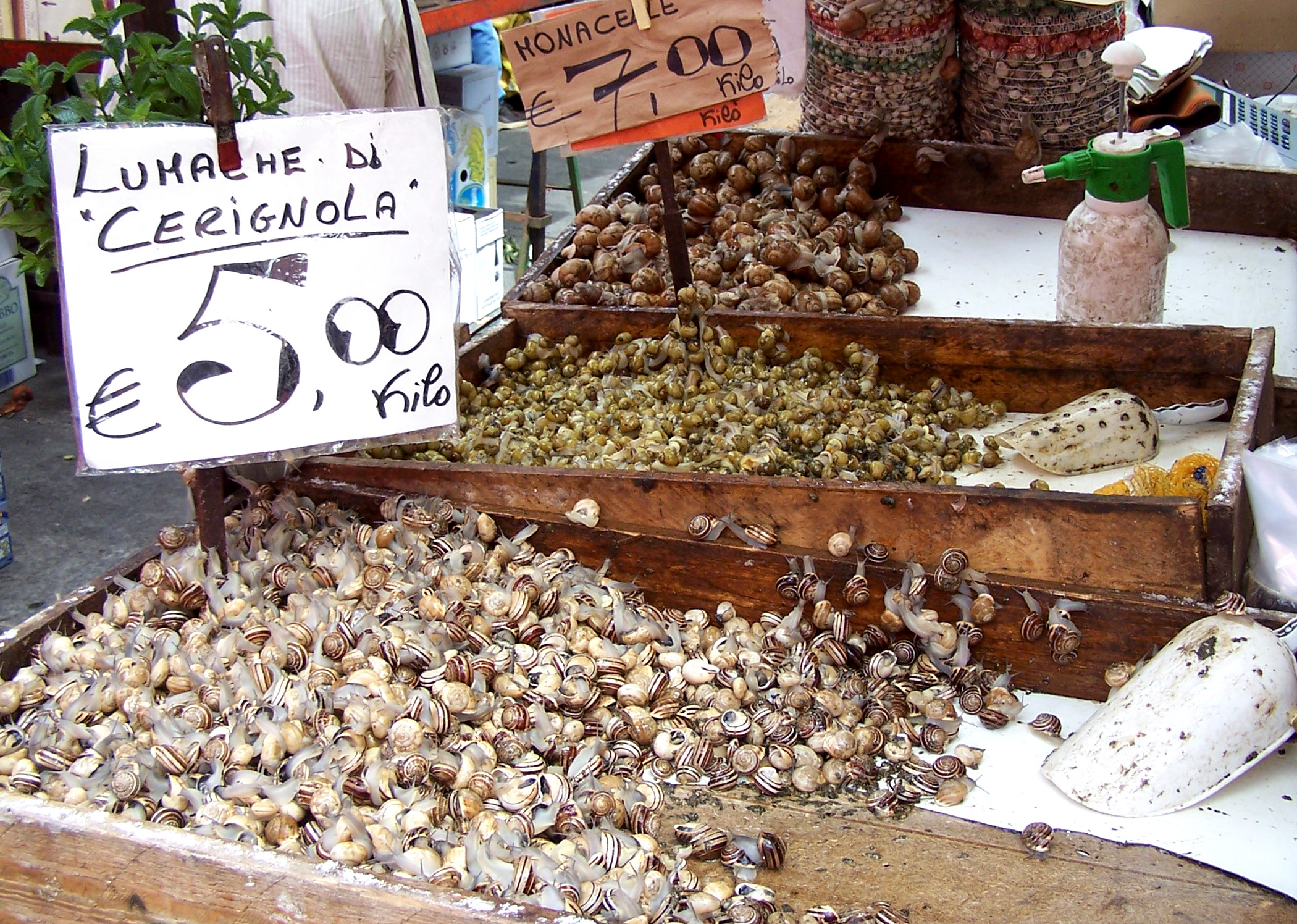
Three different species of snails for sale in a market in Turin, Italy

Most land snails are edible provided they are properly cooked. Their flavour varies by species and the way/method of cooking, and preferences may vary by culture. Only a few species are suitable for profitable farming.

Edible land snails range in size from about 2 millimetres (5/64 in) long to the giant African snails, which occasionally grow up to 312 mm (1 ft 1/4 in) in length. "Escargot" most commonly refers to either Cornu aspersum or to Helix pomatia, although other varieties of snails are eaten. Terms such as "garden snail" or "common brown garden snail" are rather meaningless, since they refer to so many types of snails, but they sometimes mean C. aspersum.

- Cornu aspersum, formerly officially called Helix aspersa Müller, is also known as the French petit gris, "small grey snail", the escargot chagrine, or la zigrinata. The shell of a mature adult has four or five whorls and measures 30 to 45 millimetres (1 1/8 to 1 3/4 in) across. It is native to the shores of the Mediterranean and along the coasts of Spain and France. It is found on many British Isles, where the Romans introduced it in the first century AD (some references say it dates to the early Bronze Age). C. aspersum has a lifespan of 2 to 5 years. This species is more adaptable to different climates and conditions than many snails, and is found in woods, fields, sand dunes, and gardens. This adaptability not only increases C. aspersum's range, but it also makes farming it easier and less risky.
- Helix pomatia measures about 45 millimetres (1 3/4 in) across the shell. It also is called the "Roman snail", "apple snail", "lunar", la vignaiola, Weinbergschnecke, escargot de Bourgogne or "Burgundy snail", or "gros blanc. Native over a large part of Europe, it lives in wooded mountains and valleys up to 2,000 metres (6,600 feet) altitude and in vineyards and gardens. The Romans may have introduced it into Britain during the Roman period (AD 43–410). Immigrants introduced it into the U.S. in Michigan and Wisconsin. Many prefer H. pomatia to C. aspersum for its flavor and larger size, as the "escargot par excellence. To date, H. pomatia, however, has not been economically viable for farming.
- Otala lactea is sometimes called the "vineyard snail", "milk snail", or "Spanish snail". The shell is white with reddish-brown spiral bands, and measures about 26 to 35 millimetres (1 to 1 3/8 in) in diameter.
- Iberus alonensis, the Spanish vaqueta or serrana, measures about 30 millimetres (1 1/8 in) across the shell.

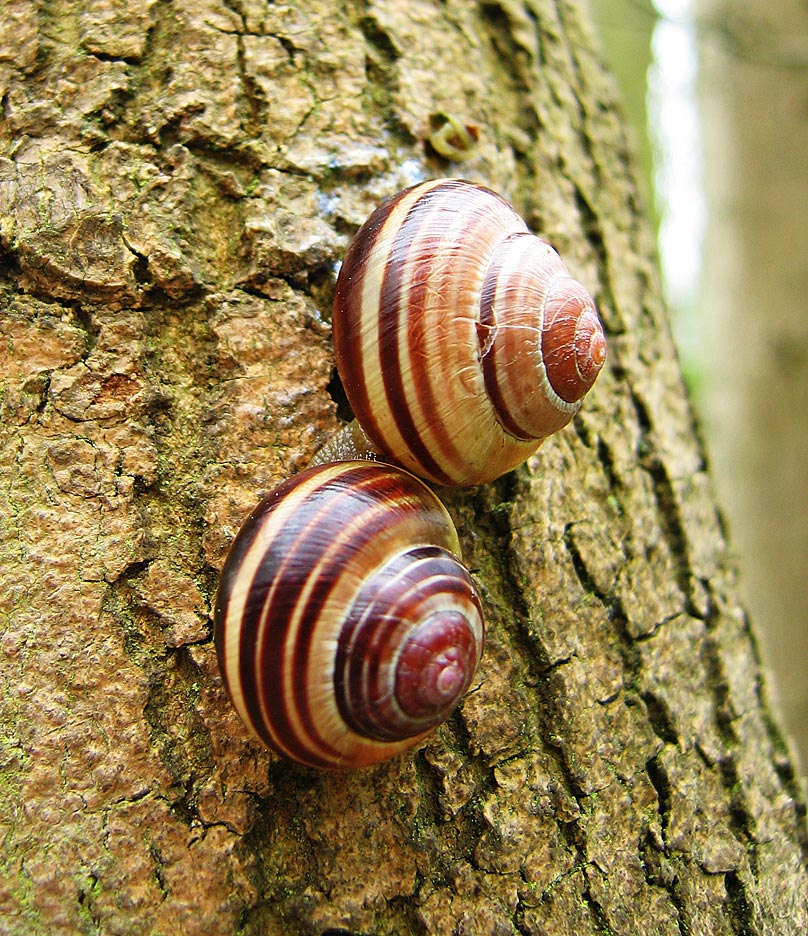
Cepaea nemoralis

- Cepaea nemoralis, the "grove snail" or Spanish vaqueta, measures about 25 millimetres (1 in) across the shell. It inhabits Central Europe and was introduced into, and is now naturalized in, many U.S. states, from Massachusetts to California, and from Tennessee to Canada. Its habitat ranges widely from woods to dunes.
- Cepaea hortensis, the "white-lipped snail", measures about 20 millimetres (3/4 in) across the shell, which often has distinct dark stripes. It is native to central and northern Europe. Its habitat varies, but C. hortensis is found in colder and wetter places than C. nemoralis. Their smaller size and some people's opinion that they do not taste as good make C. hortensis and C. nemoralis less popular than the larger European land snails.
- Otala punctata, called vaqueta in some parts of Spain, measures about 35 millimetres (1 3/8 in) across the shell.
- Eobania vermiculata, the vinyala, "mongeta, or xona, measures about 25 millimetres (1 in). It is found in Mediterranean countries and was introduced into Louisiana and Texas.
- Helix lucorum, commonly called the Turkish snail because of it prevalence in Turkey, measures about 45 millimetres (1 3/4 in) across the shell. It is found in central Italy and from Yugoslavia through the Crimea to Turkey and around the Black Sea.
- Helix adanensis comes from around Turkey.
- Helix aperta measures about 25 millimetres (1 in). Its meat is highly prized. It is native to France, Italy, and other Mediterranean countries, and has become established in California and Louisiana. Sometimes known as the "burrowing snail", it is found above ground only during rainy weather. In hot, dry weather, it burrows 3–6 inches (7.6–15.2 cm) into the ground and becomes dormant until rain softens the soil.
- Sphincterochila candidissima or Leucochroa candidissima, the "cargol mongeta or cargol jueu, measures about 20 millimetres (3/4 in).

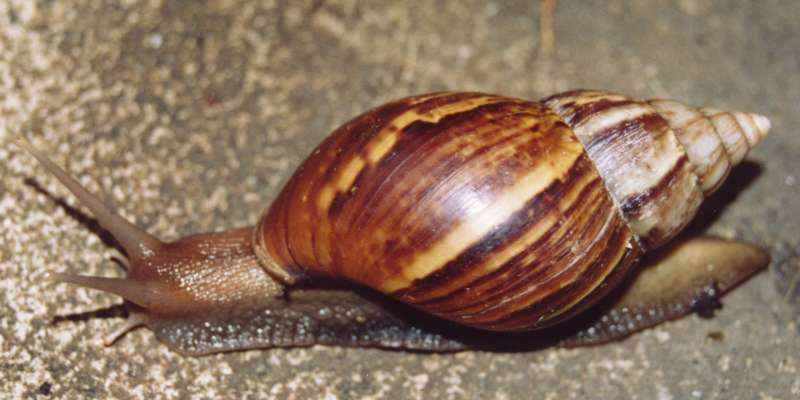
Lissachatina fulica

- Lissachatina fulica (formerly Achatina fulica) and other species in the family Achatinidae, giant African snails, can grow up to 326 millimetres (1 ft 3/4 in) in length. Their native range is south of the Sahara in East Africa. This snail was purposely introduced into India in 1847. An unsuccessful attempt was made to establish it in Japan in 1925. It has been purposely and accidentally transported to other Pacific locations and was inadvertently released in California after World War II, in Hawaii, and later in Miami, Florida, in the 1966. In many places, it is a serious agricultural pest that causes considerable crop damage. Also, due to its large size, its slime and fecal material create a nuisance as does the odor that occurs when something like poison bait causes large numbers to die. The U.S. has made considerable effort to eradicate these snails. The U.S. Department of Agriculture has banned the importation and possession of live giant African snails. However, they are still sought after as pets due to the vibrant "tiger stripes" on their shells. Giant African snails can be farmed, but their requirements and their farming methods differ significantly from those of the farming of Helix species.

== Biology ==
Understanding of the snail's biology is fundamental to use the right farming techniques. The snail's biology is therefore described here with that in mind.

=== Anatomy ===
The anatomy of the edible land snail is described in Land snail.

=== Lifecycle ===
General

Snails are hermaphrodites. Although they have both male and female reproductive organs, they must mate with another snail of the same species before they lay eggs. Some snails may act as males one season and as females the next. Other snails play both roles at once and fertilize each other simultaneously. When the snail is large enough and mature enough, which may take several years, mating occurs in the late spring or early summer after several hours of courtship. Sometimes, a second mating occurs in summer. (In tropical climates, mating may occur several times a year. In some climates, snails mate around October and may mate a second time 2 weeks later.) After mating, the snail can store sperm received for up to a year, but it usually lays eggs within a few weeks. Snails are sometimes uninterested in mating with another snail of the same species that originated from a considerable distance away. For example, a C. aspersum from southern France may reject a C. aspersum from northern France.

==== Growth ====
Within the same snail population and under the same conditions, some snails grow faster than others. Some take twice as long to mature. This may help the species survive bad weather, etc., in the wild.

Several factors can greatly influence the growth of snails, including population density, stress (snails are sensitive to noise, light, vibration, unsanitary conditions, irregular feedings, being touched, etc.), feed, temperature and moisture, and the breeding technology used.

A newly hatched snail's shell size depends on the egg size since the shell develops from the egg's surface membrane. As the snail grows, the shell is added in increments. Eventually, the shell develops a flare or reinforcing lip at its opening. This shows that the snail is now mature; no further shell growth can occur. Growth is measured by shell size, since a snail's body weight fluctuates, even in 100% humidity. The growth rate varies considerably between individuals in each population group. Adult size, which is related to the growth rate, also varies, thus the fastest growers are usually the largest snails. Eggs from larger, healthier snails also tend to grow faster and thus larger.

Dryness inhibits growth and even stops activity. When weather becomes too hot and dry in summer, the snail becomes inactive, seals its shell, and estivates (becomes dormant) until cooler, moister weather returns. Some snails estivate in groups on tree trunks, posts, or walls. They seal themselves to the surface, thus sealing up the shell opening.

Peak snail activity (including feeding and thus growth) occurs a few hours after sunset, when the temperature is lower and the water content (in the form of dew) is higher. During daytime, snails usually seek shelter.

== Snail farming ==
Successful snail culture requires the correct equipment and supplies, including snail pens or enclosures; devices for measuring humidity (hygrometer), temperature (thermometer), soil moisture (soil moisture sensor), and light (in foot candles); a weight scale and an instrument to measure snail size; a kit for testing soil contents; and a magnifying glass to see the eggs. Equipment to control the climate (temperature and humidity), to regulate water (e.g., a sprinkler system to keep the snails moist and a drainage system), to provide light and shade, and to kill or keep out pests and predators may also be needed. Some horticultural systems such as artificial lighting systems and water sprinklers may be adapted for snail culture. Better results are obtained if snails of the same kind and generation are used. Some recommend putting the hatchlings in another pen.

Four systems of snail farms can be distinguished:

- Outdoor pens
- In buildings with a controlled climate
- In closed systems such as plastic tunnel houses or "greenhouses"
- A hybrid system where snails may breed and hatch inside a controlled environment and then (after 6 to 8 weeks) may be placed in outside pens to mature.

=== Key factors to successful snail farming ===
==== Hygiene ====
Good hygiene can prevent the spread of disease and otherwise improve the health and growth rate of snails. Food is replaced daily to prevent spoilage. Earthworms added to the soil helps keep the pen clean.

Parasites, nematodes, trematodes, fungi, and microarthropods can attack snails, and such problems can spread rapidly when snail populations are dense. The bacterium Pseudomonas aeruginosa causes intestinal infections that can spread rapidly in a crowded snail pen.

Possible predators include rats, mice, moles, skunks, weasels, birds, frogs and toads, lizards, walking insects (e.g., some beetle and cricket species), some types of flies, centipedes, and even certain carnivorous snail species, such as Strangesta capillacea.

==== Population density ====
Population density also affects successful snail production. Snails tend not to breed when packed too densely or when the slime in the pen accumulates too much. The slime apparently works like a pheromone and suppresses reproduction. On the other hand, snails in groups of about 100 seem to breed better than when only a few snails are confined together. Perhaps they have more potential mates from which to choose. Snails in a densely populated area grow more slowly even when food is abundant, and they also have a higher mortality rate. These snails then become smaller adults who lay fewer clutches of eggs, have fewer eggs per clutch, and the eggs have a lower hatch rate. Smaller adult snails sell for less. Dwarfing is quite common in snail farming and is attributable mainly to rearing conditions rather than heredity factors.

==== Feeding ====
The feeding season is April through October, (or may vary with the local climate), with a "rest period" during the summer. Do not place food in one small clump so that there is not enough room for all the snails to get to it. Snails eat solid food by rasping it away with their radula. Feeding activity depends on the weather, and snails may not necessarily feed every day. Evening irrigation in dry weather may encourage feeding since the moisture makes it easier for the snails to move about.

==== Climate ====
A mild climate 15–25 °C (59–77 °F) with high humidity (75% to 95%) is best for snail farming, though most varieties can stand a wider range of temperatures. The optimal temperature is 21 °C (70 °F) for many varieties. When the temperature falls below 7 °C (45 °F), snails hibernate. Under 12 °C (54 °F) the snails are inactive, and under 10 °C (50 °F), all growth stops. When the temperature rises much above 27 °C (81 °F) or conditions become too dry, snails estivate. Wind is bad for snails because it speeds up moisture loss, and snails must retain moisture.

Snails thrive in damp but not waterlogged environments and thus a well-draining soil is required. Research indicates that water content around 80% of the carrying capacity of the soil and air humidity over 80% (during darkness) are the most favorable conditions. Many farmers use mist-producing devices to maintain proper moisture in the air and/or soil. Also, if the system contains alive vegetation, the leaves are to be periodically wet.

==== Soil ====
Snails dig in soil and ingest it. Good soil favors snail growth and provides some of their nutrition. Lack of access to good soil may cause fragile shells even when the snails have well-balanced feed; the snails' growth may lag far behind the growth of other snails on good soil. Snails often eat feed, then go eat soil. Sometimes, they eat only one or the other.

Soil care: A farmer must find a way to prevent the soil from becoming fouled with mucus and droppings and also tackle undesirable chemical changes that may occur in time.

Soil mix suggestions:

- peat, clay, compost and CaCO_{3}
- leaf mold (at pH 7)

=== Phases in snail farming ===
Some who raise C. aspersum separate the five stages: reproduction, hatching, young, fattening, and final fattening.

Depending on the scale and sophistication of a snail farm, it will contain some or all of below described sections which may or may not be merged with one and another. Each section has its particular values for the key factors to successful snail farming, described above.

==== Hibernation ====
For future reproducers, it is mandatory to hibernate for 3 months.

==== Breeding ====
Most breeders allow the snails to mate with one another on their own. If snails are kept in ideal conditions, breeding will occur at higher rates and have more success.

==== Hatchery and nursery ====
When the snails have laid their eggs, the pots are put in a nursery where the eggs will hatch. The young snails are kept in the nursery for about 6 weeks, and then moved to a separate pen, as young snails do best if kept with other snails of similar size. Eight hours of daylight is optimal for young snails.

Baby snails are fed on tender lettuce leaves (Boston type, but head type is probably also good).

Cannibalism by hatchlings

The first snails to hatch eat the shells of their eggs. This gives them calcium needed for their shells. They may then begin eating unhatched eggs. If the snail eggs are kept at the optimum temperature, 68 °F (20 °C) (for some varieties), and if none of the eggs lose moisture, most eggs will hatch within three days of each other. Cannibalism also will be low. If hatching extends over a longer period, cannibalism may increase. Some eggs eaten are eggs that were not fertile or did not develop properly, but sometimes, properly developing embryos might be eaten. A high density of "clutches" of egg masses increases the rate of cannibalism, as other nearby egg masses are more likely to be found and eaten.

==== Fattening/growing ====
In this section, the snails are grown from juvenile to mature size.

Fattening pens can be outside or in a greenhouse. High summer temperatures and insufficient moisture cause dwarfing and malformations of some snails. This is more of a problem inside greenhouses if the sun overheats the building.

A layer of coarse sand and topsoil with earthworms is placed on the fattening pen's bottom. The worms help clean up the snail droppings.

==== Harvest and purging ====
Snails are mature when a lip forms at the opening of their shell. Before they mature, their shells are more easily broken, making them undesirable. For C. aspersum, commercial weight is 8 grams or larger.

The fastest, largest, and healthy snails are selected for next-generation breeders. This is typically around 5% of the harvest. The remainder goes for sales.

Snail eggs may also be harvested and processed to produce snail caviar, but in order to do so systematically, special breeding units are created enhancing easy harvest of the eggs.

=== Types of farms, or sections thereof ===
==== Open air farms ====
Enclosures for snails are usually long and thin instead of square. This allows the workers to walk around (without harming the snails) and reach into the whole pen. The enclosure may be a trough with sides made of wood, block, fiber cement sheets, or galvanized sheet steel. Cover it with screen or netting. The covering confines the snails and keeps out birds and other predators.

The bottom of the enclosure, if it is not the ground or trays of dirt, needs be a surface more solid than screening. A snail placed in a wire-mesh-bottom pen will keep crawling, trying to get off the wires and onto solid, more comfortable ground.

==== Garden farms ====
An alternate method is to make a square pen with a 10-foot (3.0 m)-square garden in it. Plant about six crops, e.g., nettles and artichokes, inside the pen. The snails will choose what they want to eat.

Plastic tunnels make cheap, easy snail enclosures, but it is difficult to regulate heat and humidity.

==== Indoor farms ====
Fluorescent lamps can be used to give artificial daylight. Different snails respond to day length in different ways. The ratio of light to darkness influences activity, feeding, and mating and egg-laying.

Snails can be bred in boxes or cages stacked several units high. An automatic sprinkler system can be used to provide moisture. Breeding cages need a feed trough and a water trough. Plastic trays a couple of inches deep are adequate; deeper water troughs increase the chance of snails drowning in them. Trays can be set on a bed of small gravel. Small plastic pots, e.g., flower pots about 3 inches (7.6 cm) deep, can be filled with sterilized dirt (or a loamy pH neutral soil) and set in the gravel to give the snails a place to lay their eggs. After the snails lay eggs each pot is replaced. (Set one pot inside another so that one can be easily lifted without shifting the gravel.)

== Processing/transforming snails ==
Snails can be processed industrially (typically in 'factories') and as a craft (typically in 'kitchens'). Industrial processing of snails risks significant drop of the snail's quality, and with relatively high loss of material. The economies of scale that go with industrial processing, though, allow for profitable compensation. Processing by individual craftsmanship allows for much lower production, but product quality typically remains high.

== Market developments ==
=== Ukraine ===
In 2015, the first snail farm opened in Ukraine. Production was, and remains, almost entirely for export, there being no consumer market for snails in the country. Production (in tonnes) was: 93 in 2018; 200–300 in 2019; and 1,000 in 2020, when the country had 400 farms. Exports were decimated in 2020, however, by lockdowns related to the COVID-19 pandemic.

=== West Africa ===
There is a huge demand for snail meat in Western African countries. 7.9 million kg of snails are consumed in Ivory Coast each year. Other countries, such as Ghana, import snails to meet demand.

=== France ===
The COVID-19 pandemic wiped out almost all sales in France in 2020. This was especially due to the cancelling of New Year's Eve, which comprises 70% of annual sales normally.

== Restrictions and regulations ==
=== United States ===
The Animal and Plant Health Inspection Service (APHIS) categorizes giant African snails as a "quarantine significant plant pest." The United States does not allow live giant African snails into the country under any circumstances. It is illegal to own or to possess them. APHIS vigorously enforces this regulation and destroys or returns these snails to their country of origin.

Since large infestations of snails can do devastating damage, many states have quarantines against nursery products, and other products, from infested states. Further, it is illegal to import snails (or slugs) into the U.S. without permission from the Plant Protection and Quarantine (PPQ) Division of the Animal and Plant Health Inspection Service, U.S. Department of Agriculture. APHIS also oversees interstate transportation of snails.

== Emissions ==
The farming of snails for food has been claimed to potentially have lower carbon emissions compared to other animal protein sources. A case study of a farm in Southern Italy found that snail meat production resulted in 0.7 kg CO_{2} eq per kg fresh edible meat. This is a similar carbon footprint to mealworm cultivation, for which they also have a similar feed conversion ratio. This compares with about 2-4 for chicken, 6-8 for pork, and up to 50 for beef. This is attributed to snails' lack of enteric methane emissions, reduced energy demands, and feed conversion ratio.
