= Quintus Fulvius Lippinus =

Quintus Fulvius Lippinus, Fulvius Lippinus for short (a.k.a. Fulvius Hirpinius) was an enterprising Roman farmer from the first century BC. He lived in the Roman region of Tarquinia, today's Italian Tuscany. His dealings are described in the Rerum rusticarum libri III by Marcus Terentius Varro, and a century later in Pliny the Elder's Naturalis Historia.

== Wild animal husbandry ==
Fulvius Lippinus owned a domain of forty jugera in the vicinity of Tarquinia, a large domain in Statona, and some domains elsewhere. In these areas he had farms where methods were developed for keeping game such as hares, deer, and wild sheep. Lippinus was the first Roman to create game parks for keeping wild boar and pig, among others

== Snail breeding ==
However, Lippinus gained most fame by keeping and breeding snails. He built the first parks in Tarquinia, shortly before the civil war broke out between Pompey and Cæsar. With the construction and exploitation of these so-called cochlearia, Fulvius Lippinus was the first (documented) snail farmer in history. The cochlearia were parks surrounded by a water channel, to prevent the escape of the snails parked in there. These parks were equipped with an irrigation system that was the predecessor of the current agricultural sprinkler system: water pipes with a rose-shaped head were placed against a surface in such fashion that the water burst into a fine mist and thus provided the snails with the necessary moisture. Lippinus had a separate park for each snail species, each of which was marketed for its specific qualities. For example, he had small white snails from nearby Reate, large snails from Illyricum, medium-sized snails from Africa, and particularly large snails, also from Africa, the so-called Solitannae, which were very prolific.

== Preparation of escargot ==
Lippinus fed the snails with its own developed formula based on boiled wine, flour, and herbs. The snails would thrive on this diet. Pliny the Elder claimed that some snails grew so large that their houses could contain up to 80 quadrants.

With his innovative ideas for cooking snails, he also took Roman gastronomy to the next level: in preparation he would first lock the snails with milk, salt and bread in a jar with air holes for a few days, with the milk being changed daily and refreshed. As soon as the snails had swollen to the point of no longer being able to retreat to their homes, they were fried in oil or grilled on the fire and served with herbs and sauces.

== Snail trade ==
Consuming escargot would initially only be popular among the wealthy Romans. But Lippinus' methods were so successful that he eventually had to import his snails from all corners of the world to meet the growing demand from Rome. He must have been a real entrepreneur, because he even set up a ferry service to deliver regularly from Sardinia, Sicily, Capri, and the Spanish and North African coasts. He was so successful in his endeavors that others, including the well-known Romans Lucius Lucullus and Quintus Hortensius, would follow his example.

== Popularization of escargot ==
The idea of fresh snails apparently caught on, as many Roman citizens began growing snails at home, and the cochlerium became a common sight not only in Rome, but throughout the Roman Empire.

Thanks to Lippinus, escargot found its place in the ancient Roman kitchen around the start of the era. Pliny the Younger treated his visitors at home with an exclusive menu composed of "a leaf of lettuce, three snails, two eggs, spelled mixed with honey, and snow", a recipe from Lippinus. His recipes even were echoed in De re coquinaria, the cookbook by Marcus Gavius Apicius, published during the first century.

== Sources ==
This article is at its inception a translation from the Dutch Wikipedia article Quintus Fulvius Lippinus

=== Historical sources ===
- Marcus Terentius Varro (35 BC), Rerum rusticarum libri III, chapters XII and XIV.
- Pliny the Elder (77 BC), Naturalis Historia, books VIII and IX.

=== Articles based on these sources ===
- Giuseppe Del Buono (24 February 2015), "The Roman snail... and a secret recipe of Gourmet Italiano," Wall Street i-Magazine
- CooksInfo (30 August 2019), Fulvius Lippinus
- PassTheFlamingo (16 January 2018), Ancient Recipe: Snails with Pepper and Cumin (Roman, ca. 5th century CE)
