= Snail caviar =

Fresh or processed eggs of land snails

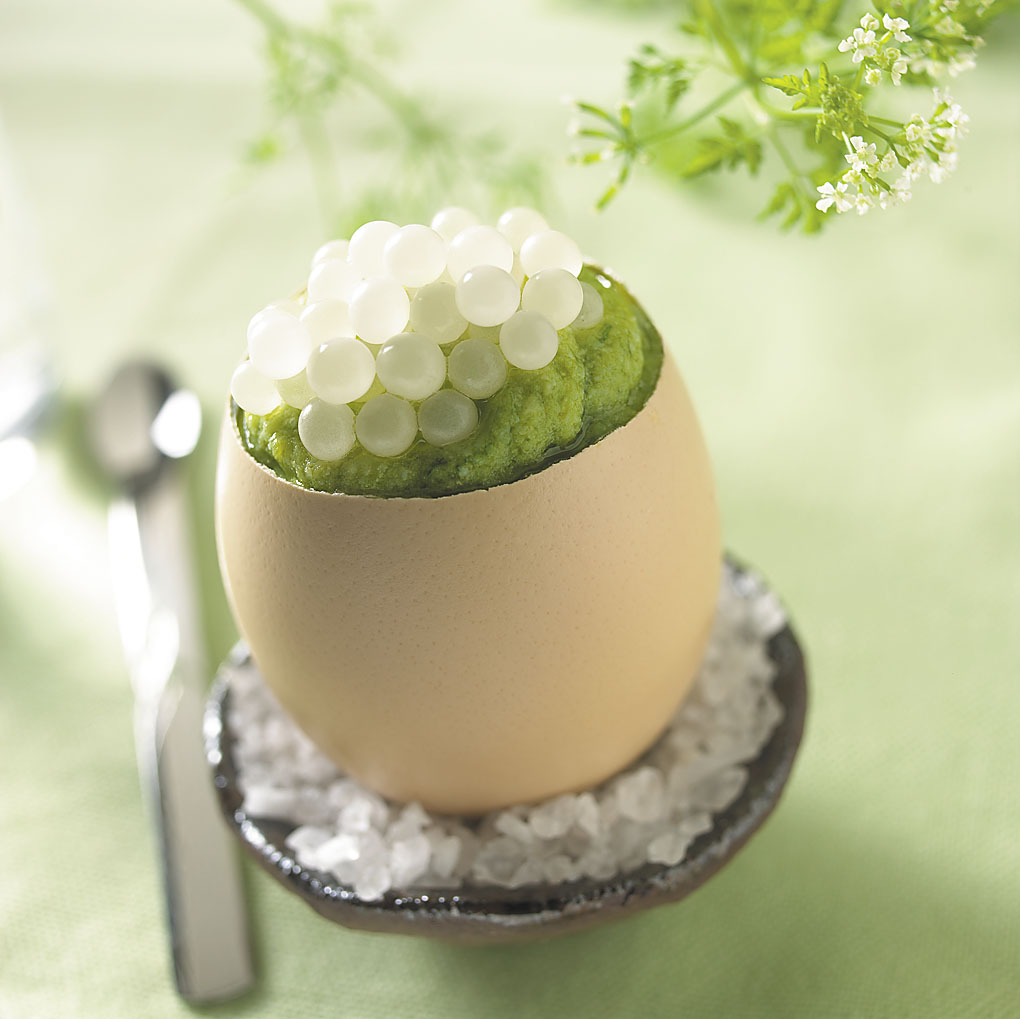
A dish topped with snail caviar

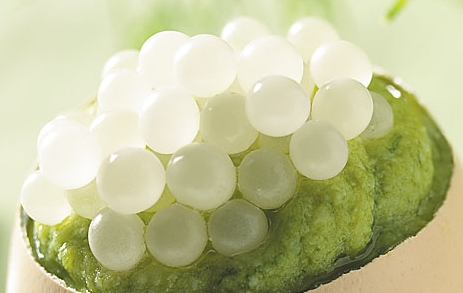
A close-up view of snail caviar

Snail caviar, also known as escargot caviar or escargot pearls, is the fresh or processed eggs of land snails. It is a luxury gourmet specialty produced in Austria, Czechia, France and Poland. They were also a delicacy in the ancient world, also known as "pearls of Aphrodite" for their supposed aphrodisiac properties.

In their natural state, the eggs are colourless. After processing, the eggs may be cream-coloured, pinkish-white, or white, with the eggs generally 3–4 mm in diameter. Some snail eggs may measure at 3–6 mm in diameter. Some commercial snail farms that produce escargot include the production of snail caviar as a part of their operations.

== Characteristics ==
The raw snail eggs have a slick shell that is delicate and breakable. They are sometimes pasteurised to preserve them. However, the pasteurisation of snail eggs has been described as having a tarnishing effect upon their flavour. Some preserved versions are processed and jarred without the use of pasteurisation, using brine as a preservative. Some producers use a flavoured brine to add flavour to the product.

The flavour of snail caviar has been described as being reminiscent of "baked asparagus", or "baked mushroom" with a "subtle" flavour with "woody notes", as having a "strong earthy" flavour, and as being crunchier than fish egg caviar. It may be served as other caviars are, with toast points, sour cream and champagne. It may also be served in soups.

== Snail farms ==
Snail farming is referred to as heliciculture, and includes the process of farming or raising land snails specifically for human consumption. Some commercial snail farms collect and process snail caviar, which is then jarred and marketed to consumers. Sometimes the snails are raised and kept in temperature, lighting and climate controlled conditions to encourage maximal reproduction, which produces the eggs. Since snails are hermaphroditic (having both male and female sexual organs), all can produce eggs. Snails typically bury their eggs in soil after they are laid.

One method of harvesting the eggs involves placing the snails in boxes that have soil and sand in them, whereupon the eggs are gathered. Snail egg output is meagre when compared to fish roe production such as that from sturgeon. As a comparison, one snail typically lays approximately four grams of eggs annually, whereas one sturgeon may have up to 18 kilograms (40 lb) of eggs.

== Market ==
In August 1987 in the United States, the Brut d'Escargot brand of snail caviar was reported as having a retail market value of $1,400 per kilogram ($40/oz). At that time, the retail price was similar to that of Beluga caviar. In December 2007, a 50-gram jar of De Jaeger brand snail caviar, produced at a snail farm in Soissons, France, retailed for €80. In September 2014, a 50-gram jar of Viennese Snails brand snail caviar, produced at a farm near Vienna, Austria, retailed for more than €150. A 50-gram jar equates to approximately two tablespoons of product. Some snail farms sell snail caviar directly to restaurants.

== See also ==
- List of delicacies
- Snails as food
