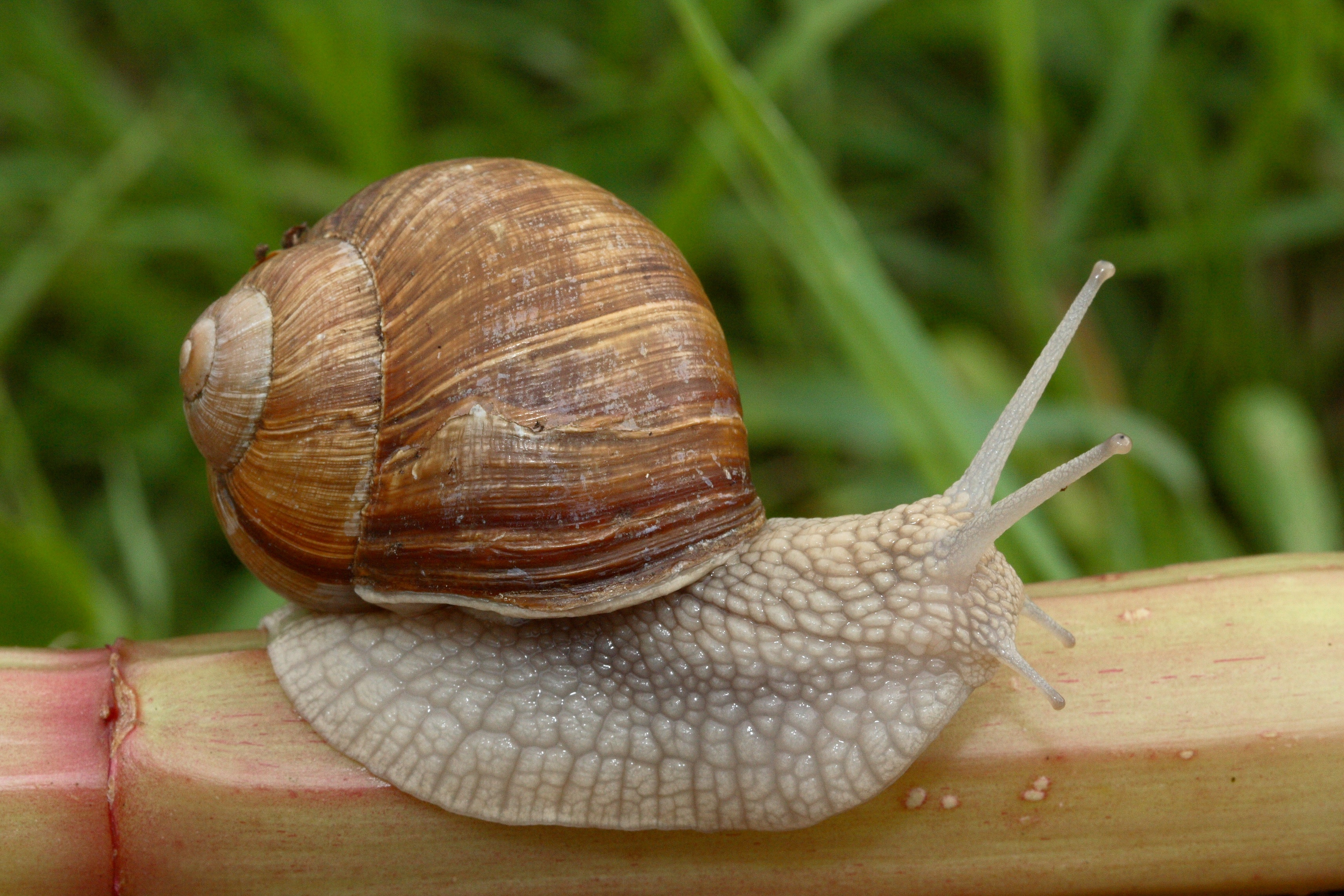

Conservation status
- Least Concern (IUCN 3.1)

- Secure (NatureServe)

Scientific classification
- Kingdom: Animalia
- Phylum: Mollusca
- Class: Gastropoda
- Order: Stylommatophora
- Family: Helicidae
- Genus: Helix
- Species: H. pomatia

Binomial name
- Helix pomatia Linnaeus, 1758

Synonyms
- List: Helicogena inflata Hartmann, 1844; Helicogena pomatia (Linnaeus, 1758); Helicogena pomatia var. gesneri Hartmann, 1844; Helicogena pomatia var. rustica Hartmann, 1844; Helicogena pomatia var. sphaeralis Hartmann, 1844; Helix (Helix) pomatia Linnaeus, 1758; Helix eusarcosoma Servain, 1884; Helix pomaria O. F. Müller, 1774; Helix pomatia albida Moquin-Tandon, 1855; Helix pomatia brunnea Moquin-Tandon, 1855; Helix pomatia expansilabris Kobelt, 1906; Helix pomatia parva Moquin-Tandon, 1855; Helix pomatia quinquefasciata Moquin-Tandon, 1855; Helix pomatia var. banatica Kimakowicz, 1890; Helix pomatia var. claudiensis Kobelt, 1906; Helix pomatia var. compacta Hazay, 1880; Helix pomatia var. costellata Kobelt, 1906; Helix pomatia var. dobrudschae Kobelt, 1906; Helix pomatia var. elsae Kobelt, 1906; Helix pomatia var. gratiosa Gredler, 1892; Helix pomatia var. hajnaldiana Hazay, 1880; Helix pomatia var. kapellae Kobelt, 1906; Helix pomatia var. lagarinae Adami, 1885; Helix pomatia var. lednicensis Brancsik, 1888; Helix pomatia var. luteola Kobelt, 1906; Helix pomatia var. pannonica Kobelt, 1906; Helix pomatia var. pedemontana Kobelt, 1907; Helix pomatia var. piceata Gredler, 1890; Helix pomatia var. pulskyana Hazay, 1880; Helix pomatia var. radiata Ulicny, 1885; Helix pomatia var. sabulosa Hazay, 1880; Helix pomatia var. serbica Kobelt, 1906; Helix pomatia var. solitaria Hazay, 1880; Helix pomatia var. transsylvanica Kobelt, 1906; Helix promaeca Bourguignat, 1882; Helix pyrgia Bourguignat, 1882; Helix scalaris O. F. Müller, 1774; Helix segalaunica Sayn, 1888

= Helix pomatia =

Species of gastropod

Helix pomatia, known as the Roman snail, or Burgundy snail, , is a species of large, air-breathing stylommatophoran land snail belonging to the family Helicidae and native to Europe. It is characterized by a globular brown shell.

== Distribution ==
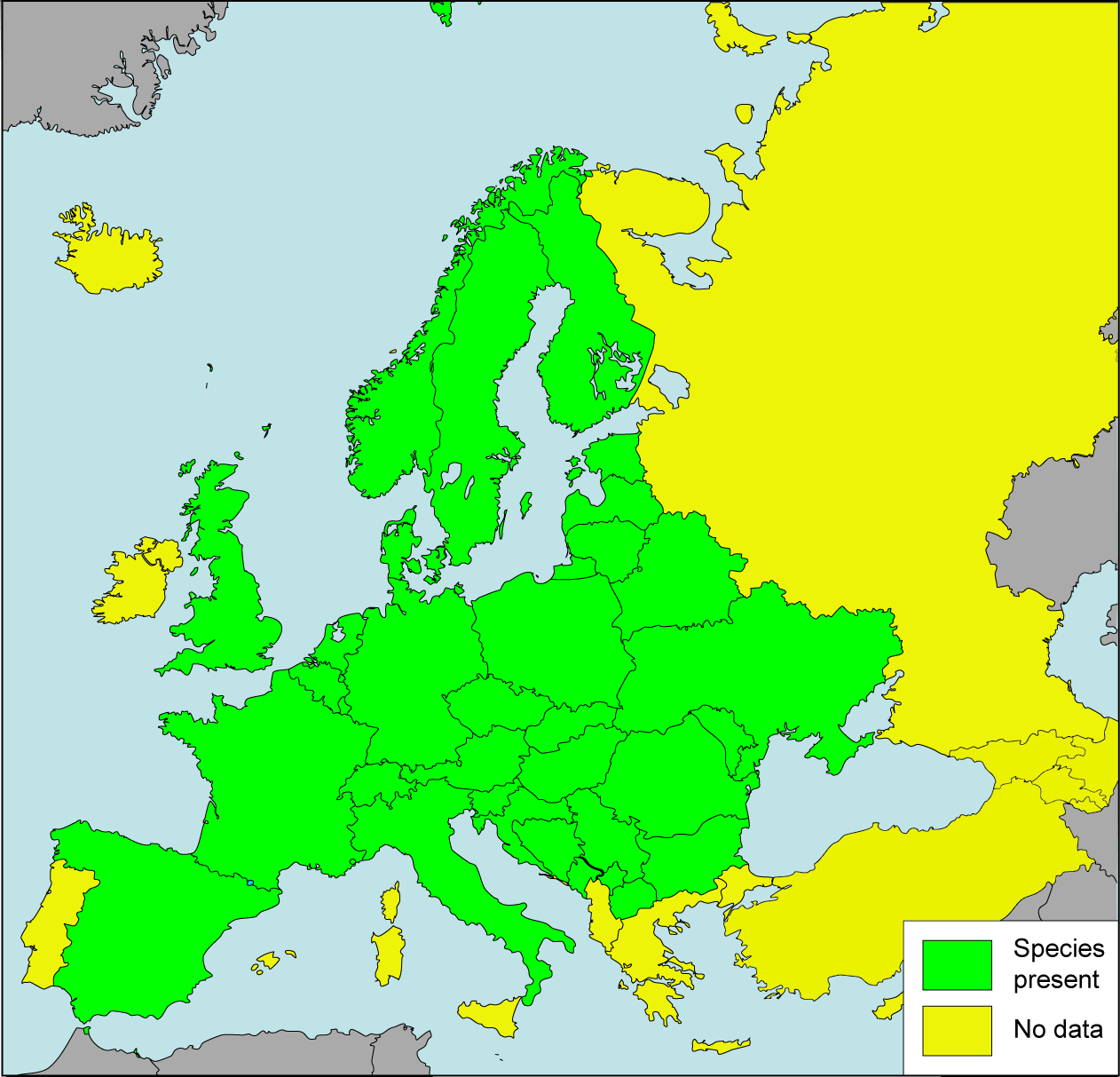
Distribution map of H. pomatia showing the European countries where the species is present

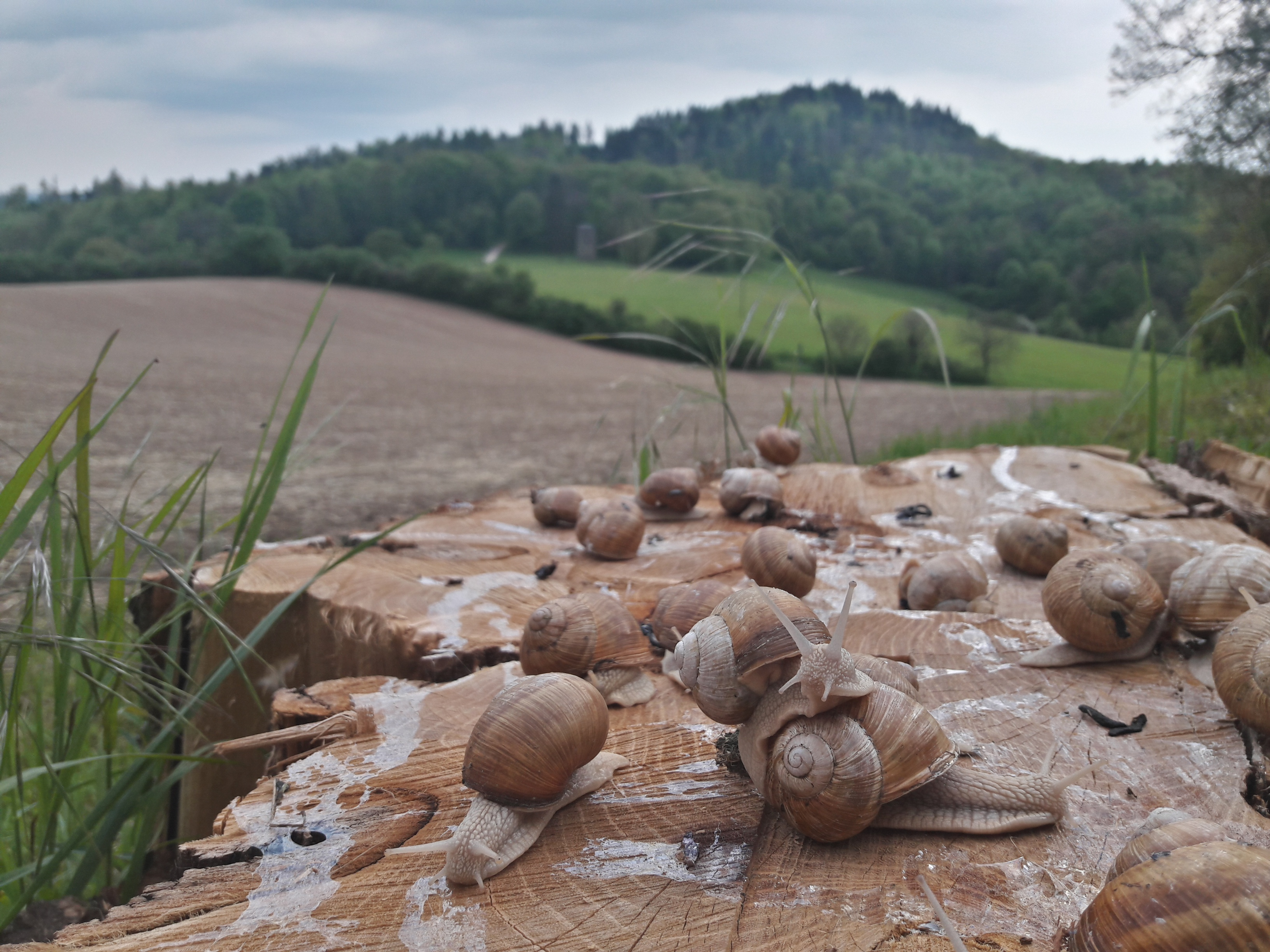
In Odenwald, Germany

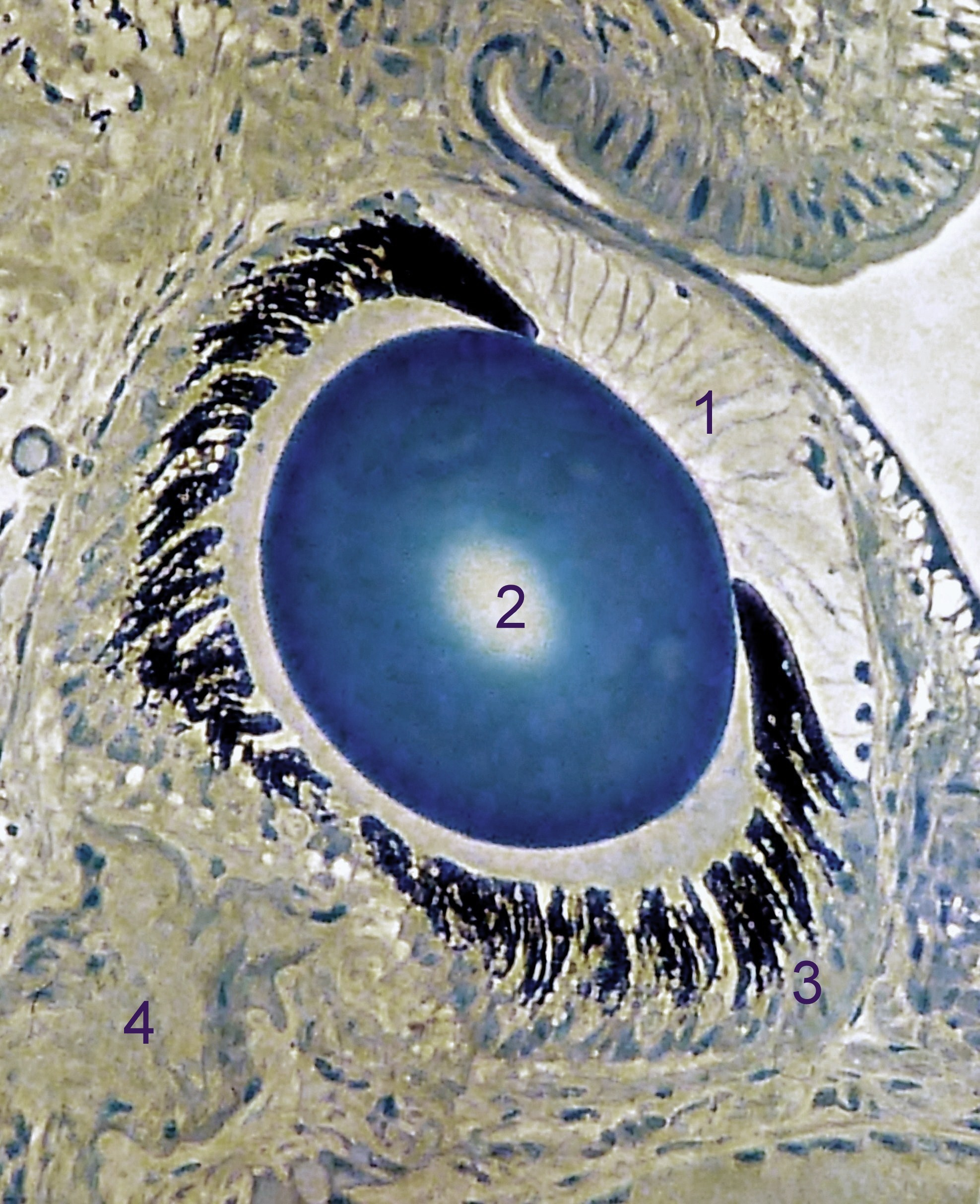
Helix pomatia, light micrograph of an eye; 1 anterior chamber, 2 lens, 3 retina, 4 optic nerve

The present distribution of Helix pomatia is considerably affected by the dispersion by human and synanthropic occurrences. The northern limits of their natural distribution run presumably through central Germany and southern Poland with the eastern range limits running through western-most Ukraine and Moldova/Romania to Bulgaria. In the south, the species reaches northern Bulgaria, central Serbia, Bosnia and Hezegovina and Croatia. It occurs in northern Italy southwards to the Po and the Ligurian Apennines. Westerly the native range extends to eastern France. Currently, H. pomatia is distributed up to western Russia (broadly distributed in and around Moscow), to the south of Finland, Sweden and Norway, in Denmark and the Benelux. Scattered introduced populations occur westwards up to northern Spain. In Great Britain, it lives on chalk soils in the south and west of England. In the east, isolated populations live as far as south of Novosibirsk. Introduced populations also exist in the eastern United States and Canada.

== Description ==
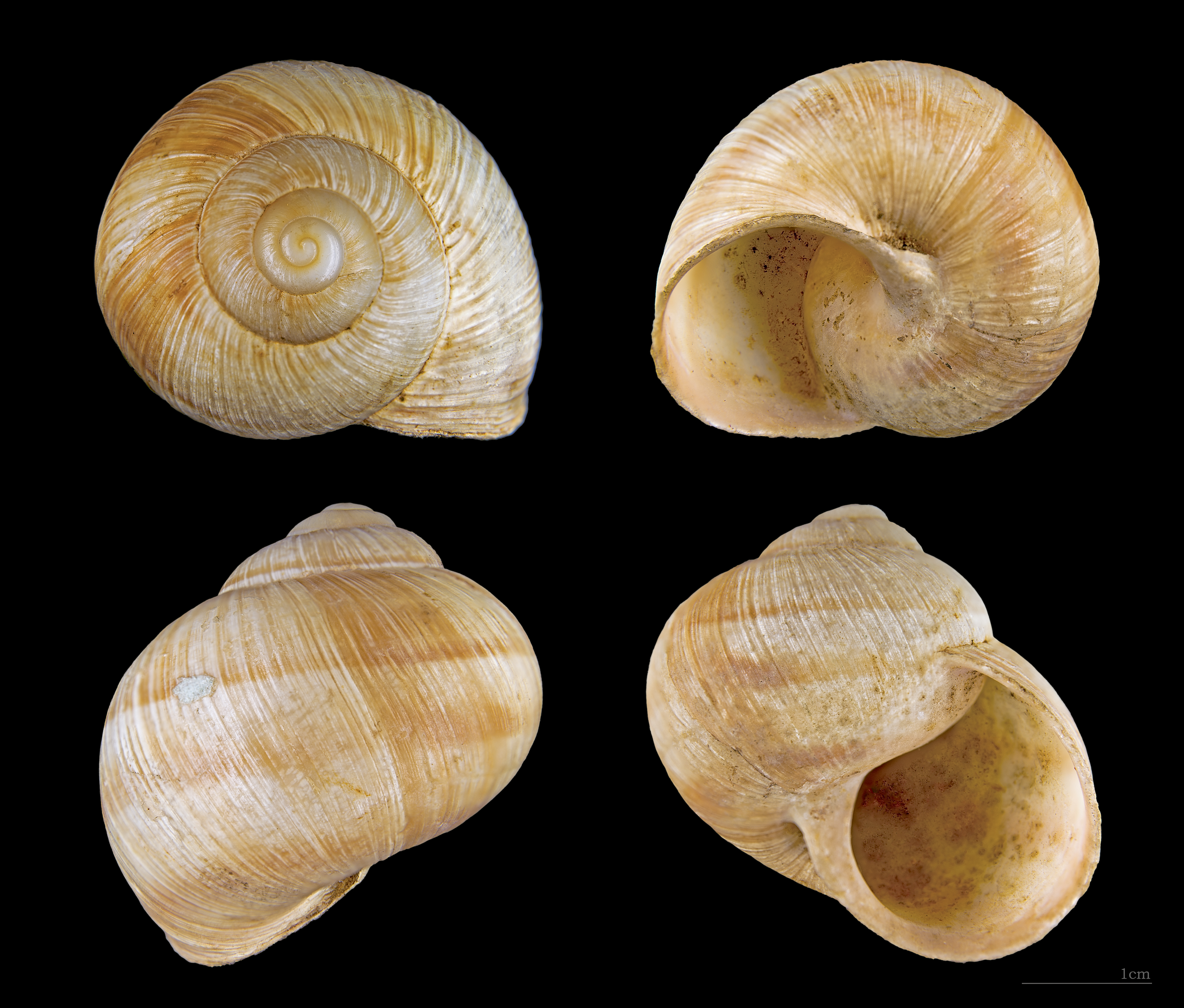
View of a shell of Helix pomatia

The shell is creamy white to light brownish, often with indistinct brown colour bands although sometimes the banding is well developed and conspicuous. The shell has five to six whorls. The aperture is large. The apertural margin is slightly reflected in adult snails. The umbilicus is narrow and partly covered by the reflected columellar margin.

The width of the shell is 30–50 millimetres (1.2–2.0 inches). The height of the shell is 30–45 mm (1.2–1.8 in).

== Ecology ==
=== Habitat ===
In Central Europe, it occurs in forests and shrubland, as well as in various synanthropic habitats. It lives up to 2,100 m (6,900 ft) above sea level in the Alps, but usually below 2,000 m (6,600 ft). In the south of England, it is restricted to undisturbed grassy or bushy wastelands, usually not in gardens.

=== Lifecycle ===
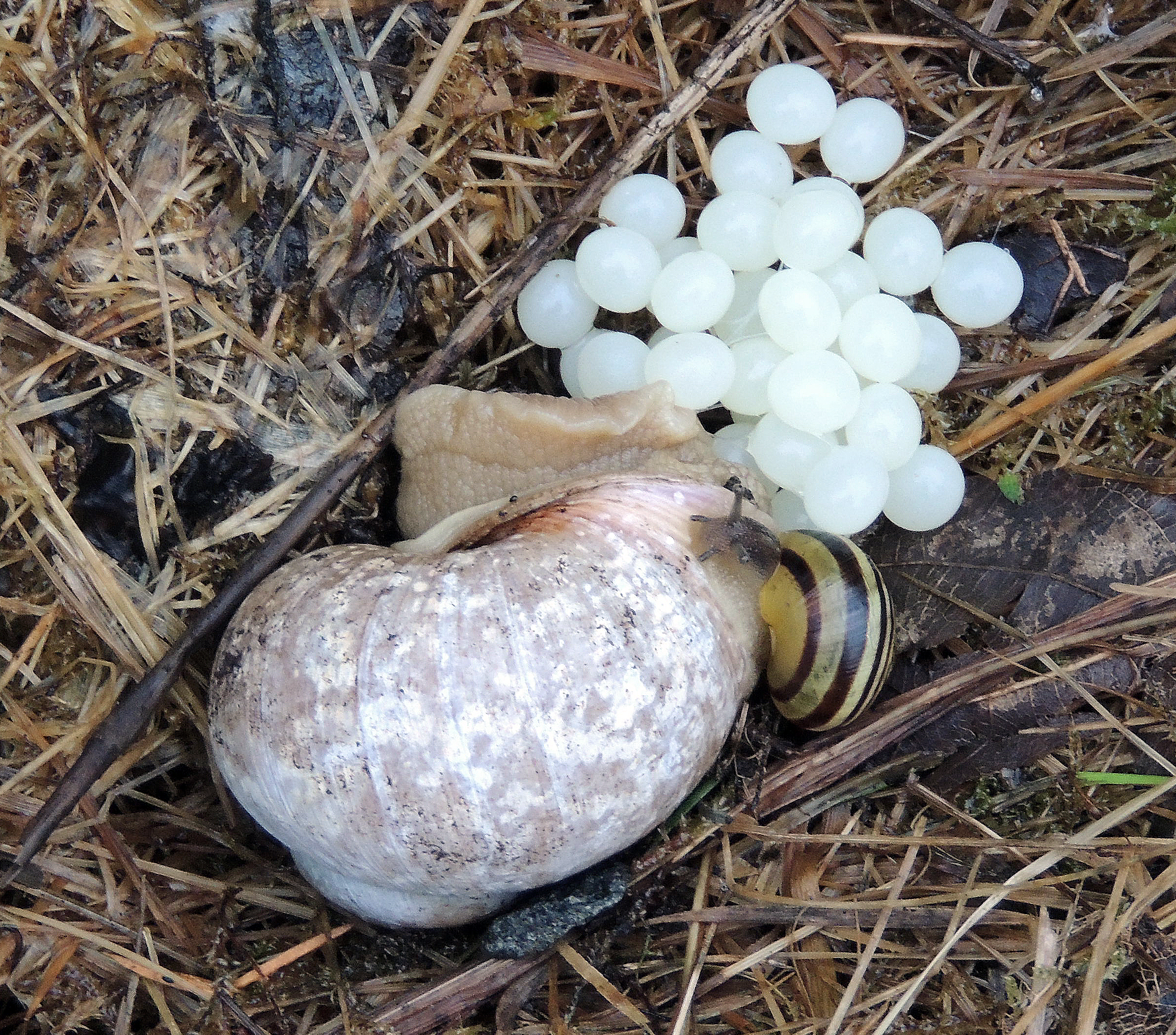
Helix pomatia (left) laying eggs

This snail is hermaphroditic. Reproduction in Central Europe begins at the end of May.

Reproduction

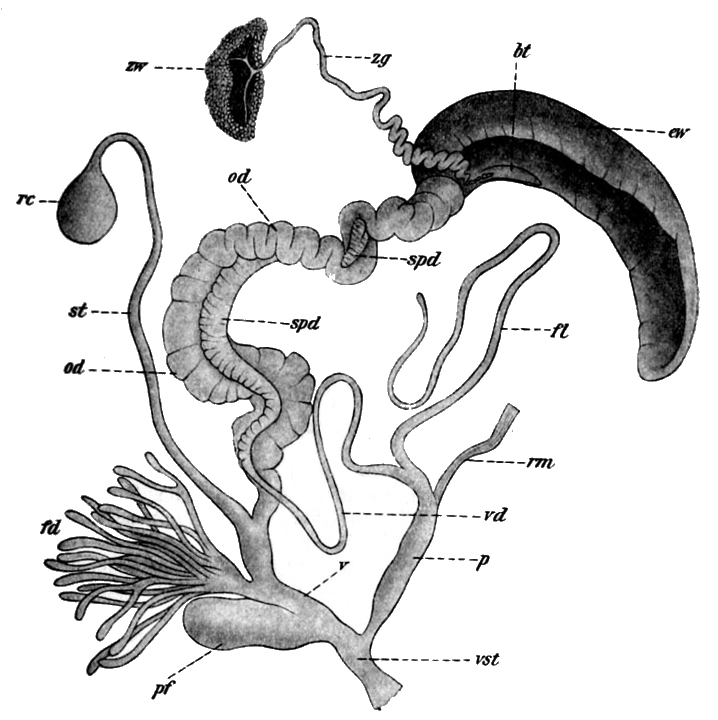
Reproductive system of H. pomatia

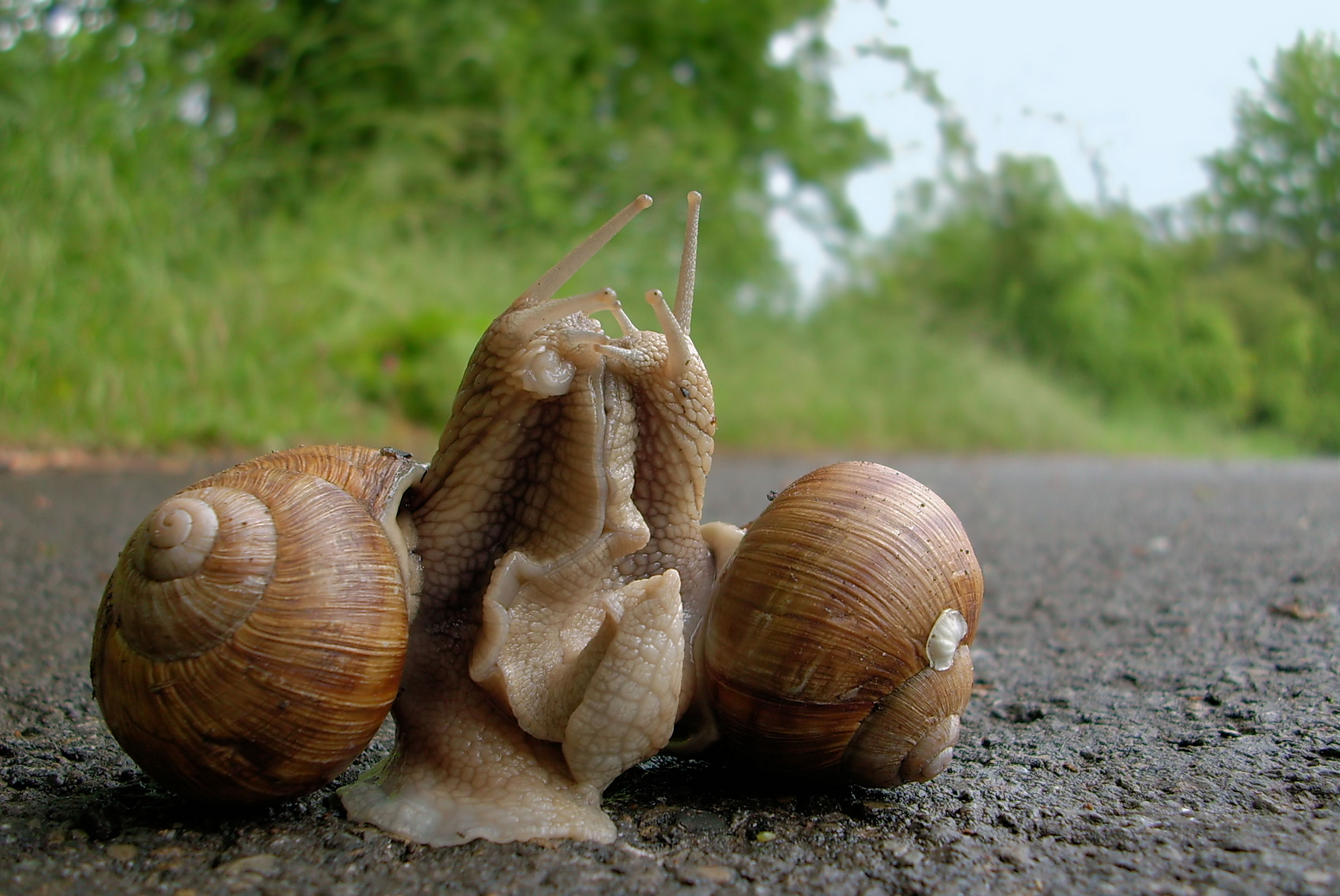
A pair of H. pomatia in courtship, shortly before mating

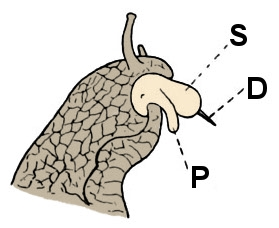
Drawing of head of mating H. pomatia with everted penis and dart sac shooting a love dart

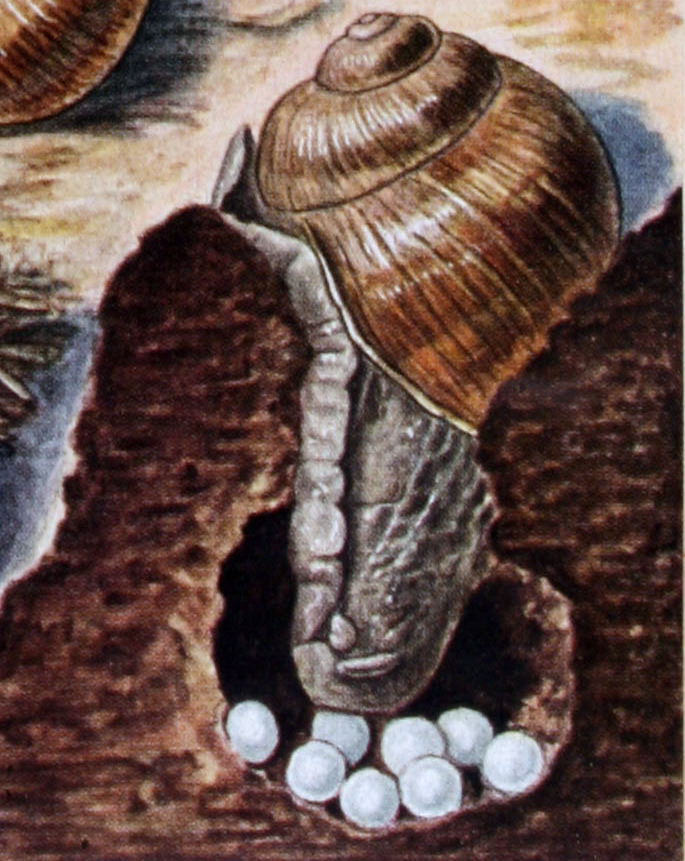
Drawing of H. pomatia laying eggs

Eggs are laid in June and July, in clutches of 40–65 eggs. The size of the egg is 5.5–6.5 mm or 8.6 × 7.2 mm. Juveniles hatch after three to four weeks, and may consume their siblings under unfavourable climate conditions. Maturity is reached after two to five years. The life span is up to 20 years, but they often die sooner due to drying in summer and freezing in winter. Ten-year-old individuals are probably not uncommon in natural populations. The maximum lifespan is 35 years.

During estivation or hibernation, H. pomatia is one of the few species that is capable of creating a calcareous epiphragm to seal the opening of its shell.

Hibernation

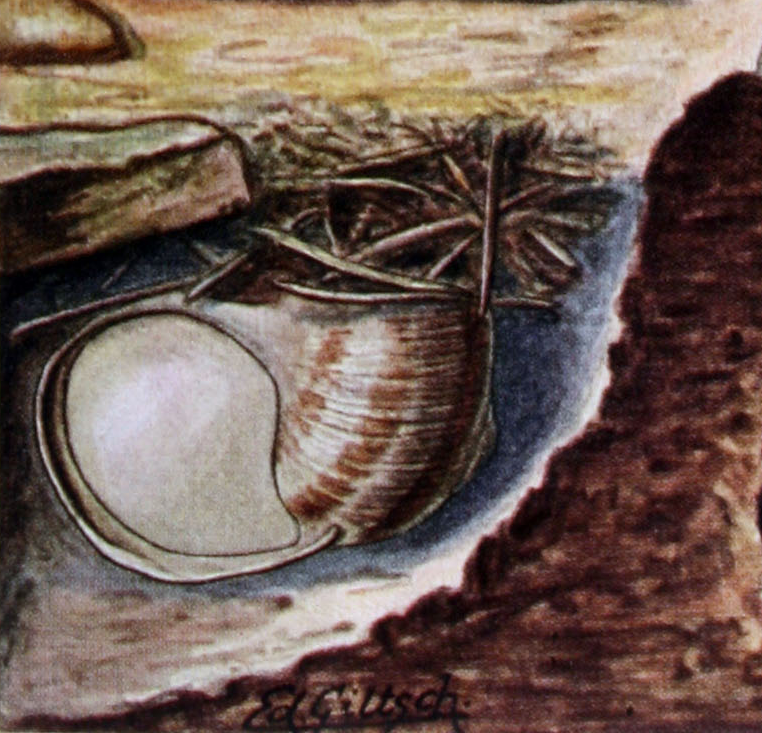
Drawing of H. pomatia during hibernation

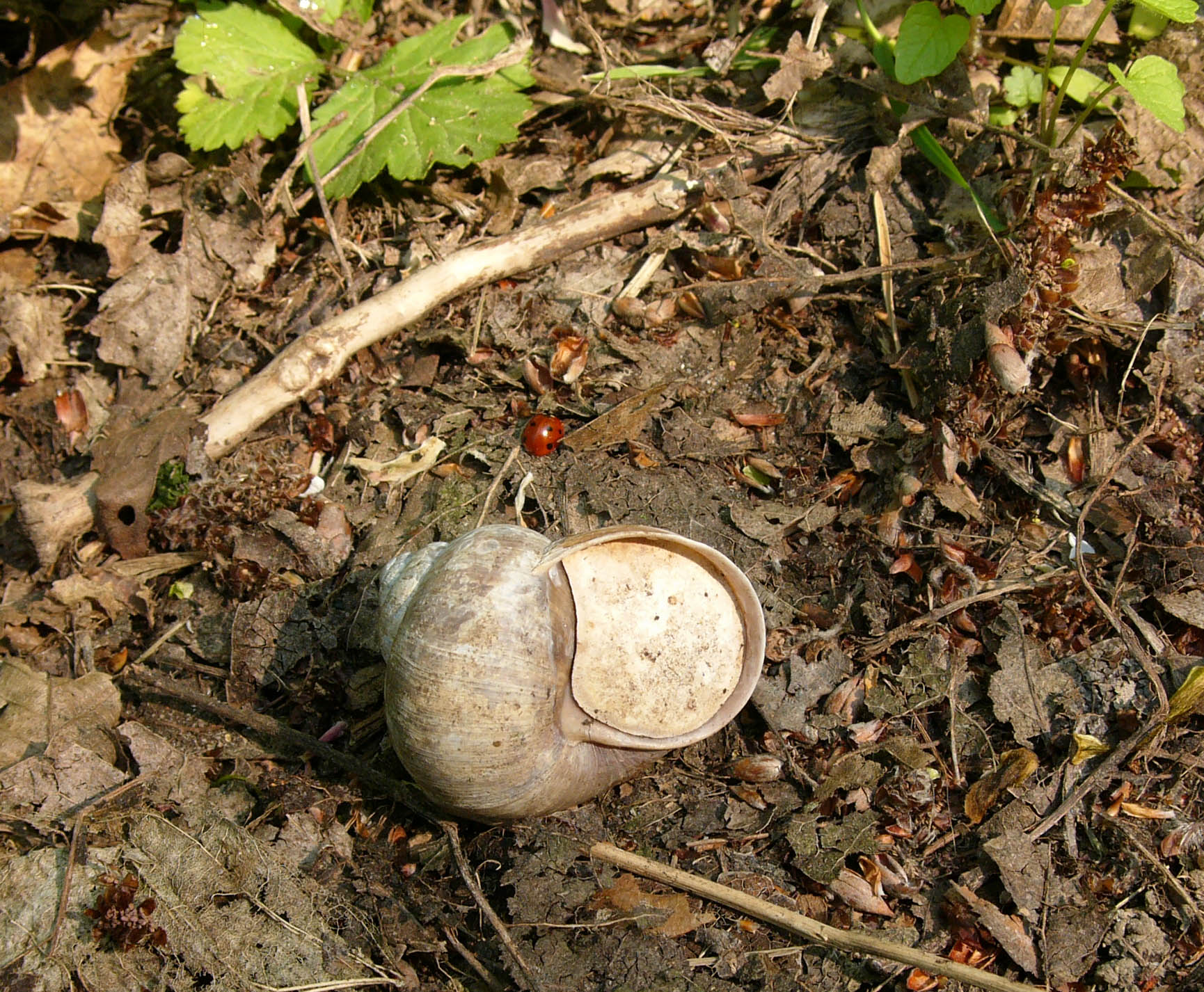
Photo of the shell with an epiphragm

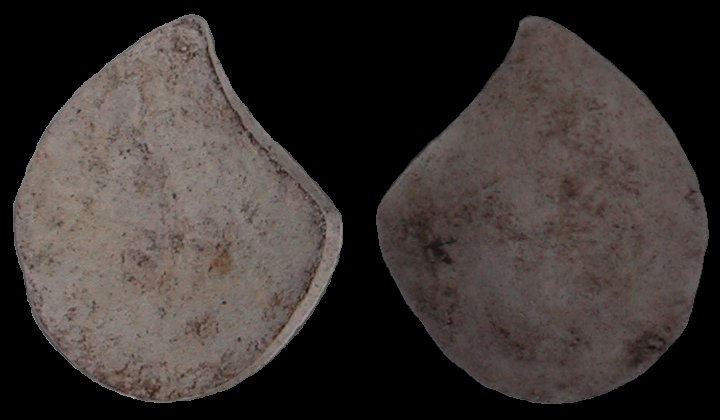
Epiphragm of H. pomatia

Preference for feeding on the nettle Urtica dioica was found in H. pomatia juveniles in Germany.

== Conservation ==
This species is listed in IUCN Red List, and in European Red List of Non-marine Molluscs as of least concern. H. pomatia is threatened by continuous habitat destructions and drainage, usually less threatened by commercial collections. Many unsuccessful attempts have been made to establish the species in various parts of England, Scotland, and Ireland; it only survived in natural habitats in southern England, and is threatened by intensive farming and habitat destruction. It is of lower concern in Switzerland and Austria, but many regions restrict commercial collecting.

Within its native range, Helix pomatia is mostly a common species. It is also considered Least Concern by the IUCN Red List. However, it is listed in the Annex V of the EU's Habitats Directive and protected by law in several countries to regulate harvesting from free living populations.

- Germany: listed as a specially protected species in annex 1 of the Bundesartenschutzverordnung.
- Austria: the protection is up to Bundesländer, and the species is protected in some (e.g. Burgenland).
- Great Britain: protected in England under the Wildlife and Countryside Act 1981, making it illegal to kill, injure, collect or sell these snails.
- France: collecting prohibited of individuals with shell diameter under 3 cm and during the period from 1 April to 30 June.
- Denmark: commercial collecting is prohibited.

== Uses ==
The intestinal juice of H. pomatia contains large amounts of aryl, steroid, and glucosinolate sulfatase activities. These sulfatases have a broad specificity, so they are commonly used as a hydrolyzing agent in analytical procedures such as chromatography where they are used to prepare samples for analysis.

== Culinary use and history ==
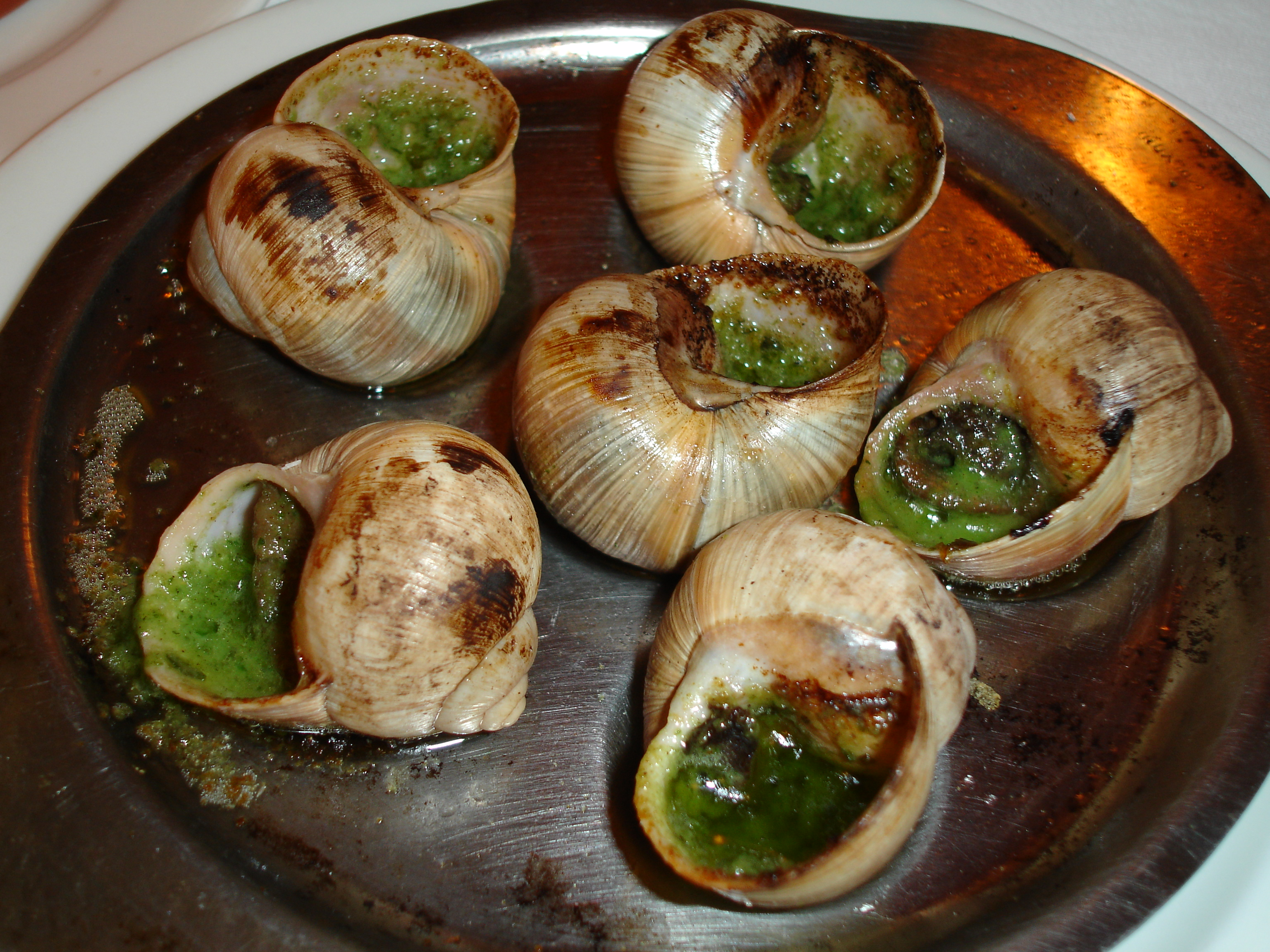
Cooked snails are called escargots.

Roman snails were eaten by Ancient Romans.

Nowadays, these snails are especially popular in French cuisine. In the English language, it is called by the French name escargot when used in cooking (escargot simply means snail). Although this species is highly prized as a food, it is difficult to cultivate and is rarely farmed commercially.
