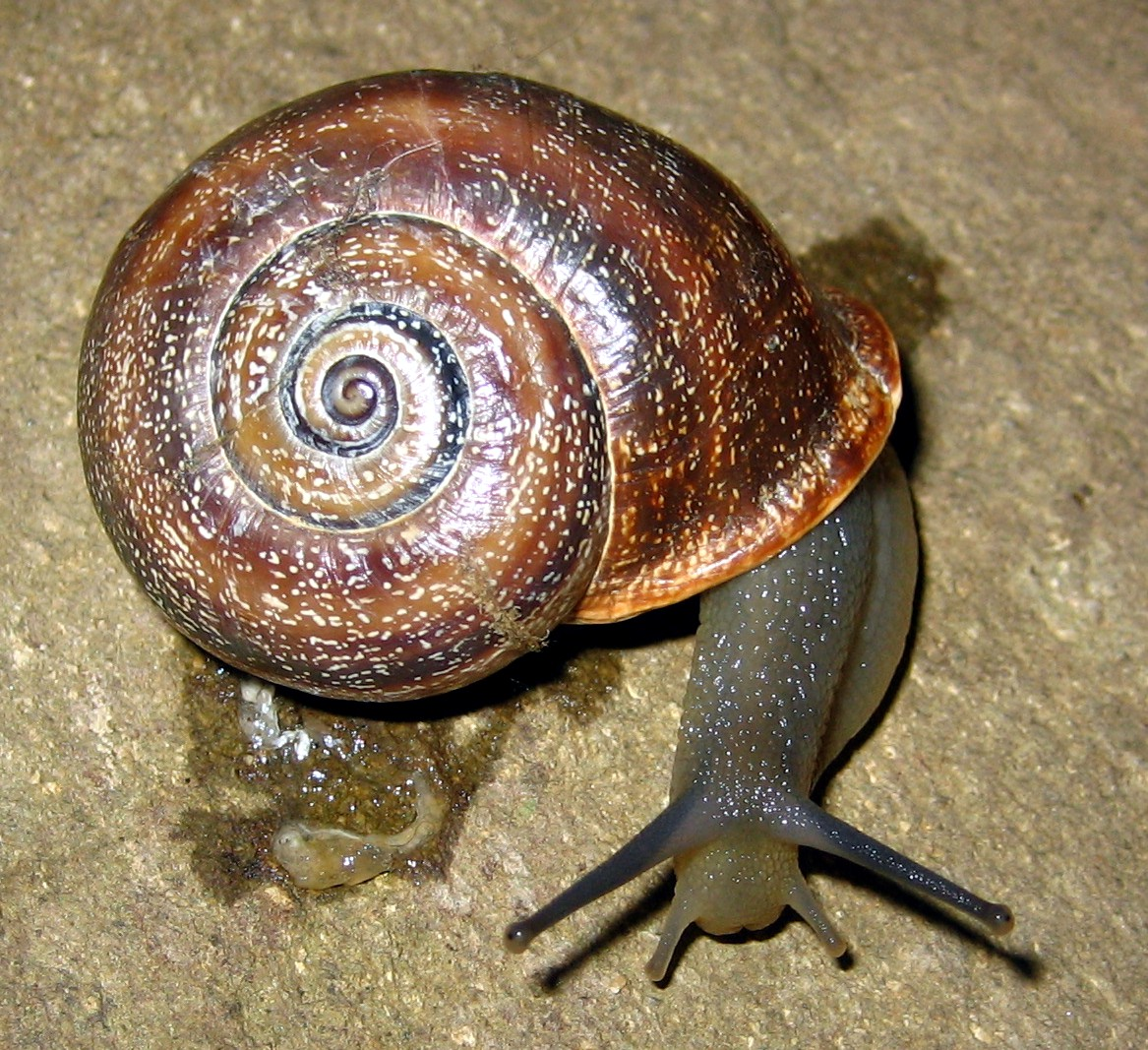
- Otala punctata

Scientific classification
- Kingdom: Animalia
- Phylum: Mollusca
- Class: Gastropoda
- Order: Stylommatophora
- Family: Helicidae
- Subfamily: Helicinae
- Tribe: Thebini
- Genus: Otala; Schumacher, 1817

Synonyms
- Archelix Albers, 1850 (objective junior synonym); Archelix (Dupotetia) Kobelt, 1904; Helix (Archelix) Albers, 1850 (objective junior synonym); Otala (Deserticola) P. Hesse, 1911· accepted, alternate representation; Otala (Dupotetia) Kobelt, 1904· accepted, alternate representation; Otala (Otala) Schumacher, 1817· accepted, alternate representation; † Pachydupotetia Pfeffer, 1930 (junior subjective synonym); Tingitana Pallary, 1919 (junior synonym)

= Otala =

Genus of gastropods

Otala is a genus of land snails in the subfamily Helicinae of the family Helicidae.

Archaeological evidence in Morocco indicates the exploitation of O. lactea by ancient Romans as a food source.

== Distribution ==
This genus of snail is native to northwestern Africa and southwestern Europe.

== Anatomy ==
These snails create and shoot love darts as part of their courtship and mating behavior.

== Species ==
Species within the genus Otala include:

- † Otala desoudiniana (Crosse, 1862)
- Otala hieroglyphicula (Michaud, 1833)
- † Otala jobaeana (Crosse, 1861)
- Otala juilleti (Terver, 1839)
- Otala lactea (Müller, 1774)
- Otala occulta D. Holyoak, G. Holyoak, Gómez Moliner & Chueca, 2020
- Otala orientalis (Pallary, 1918)
- Otala pallaryi (Kobelt, 1909)
- Otala punctata (Müller, 1774)
- Otala ramosi (Ahuir & Liñán, 2021)
- Otala tingitana (Paladilhe, 1875)
- Otala xanthodon (Anton, 1838)

Species brought into synonymy

- Otala (Otala) alicantensis Truc, 1971 †: synonym of Schlickumia alicantensis (Truc, 1971) †
- Otala (Otala) bottini (Sacco, 1884) †: synonym of Schlickumia bottinii (Sacco, 1884) † (incorrect subsequent spelling; new combination)
- Otala canariensis Mousson, 1872: synonym of Otala lactea (Müller, 1774)
- Otala jacquemetana Mabille, 1883: synonym of Otala lactea (Müller, 1774)
- Otala vermiculata (O. F. Müller, 1774): synonym of Eobania vermiculata (O. F. Müller, 1774)
