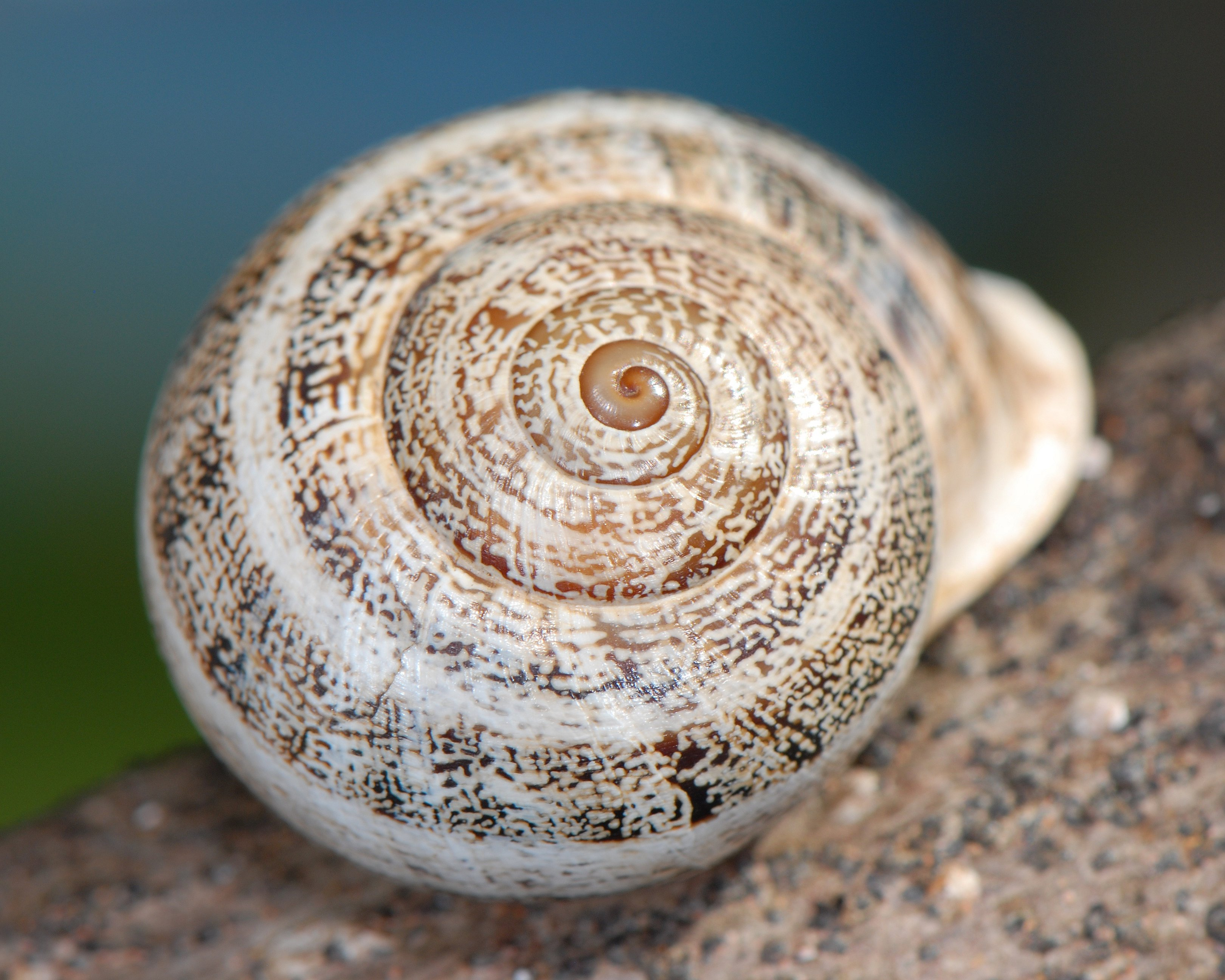
- Live individual
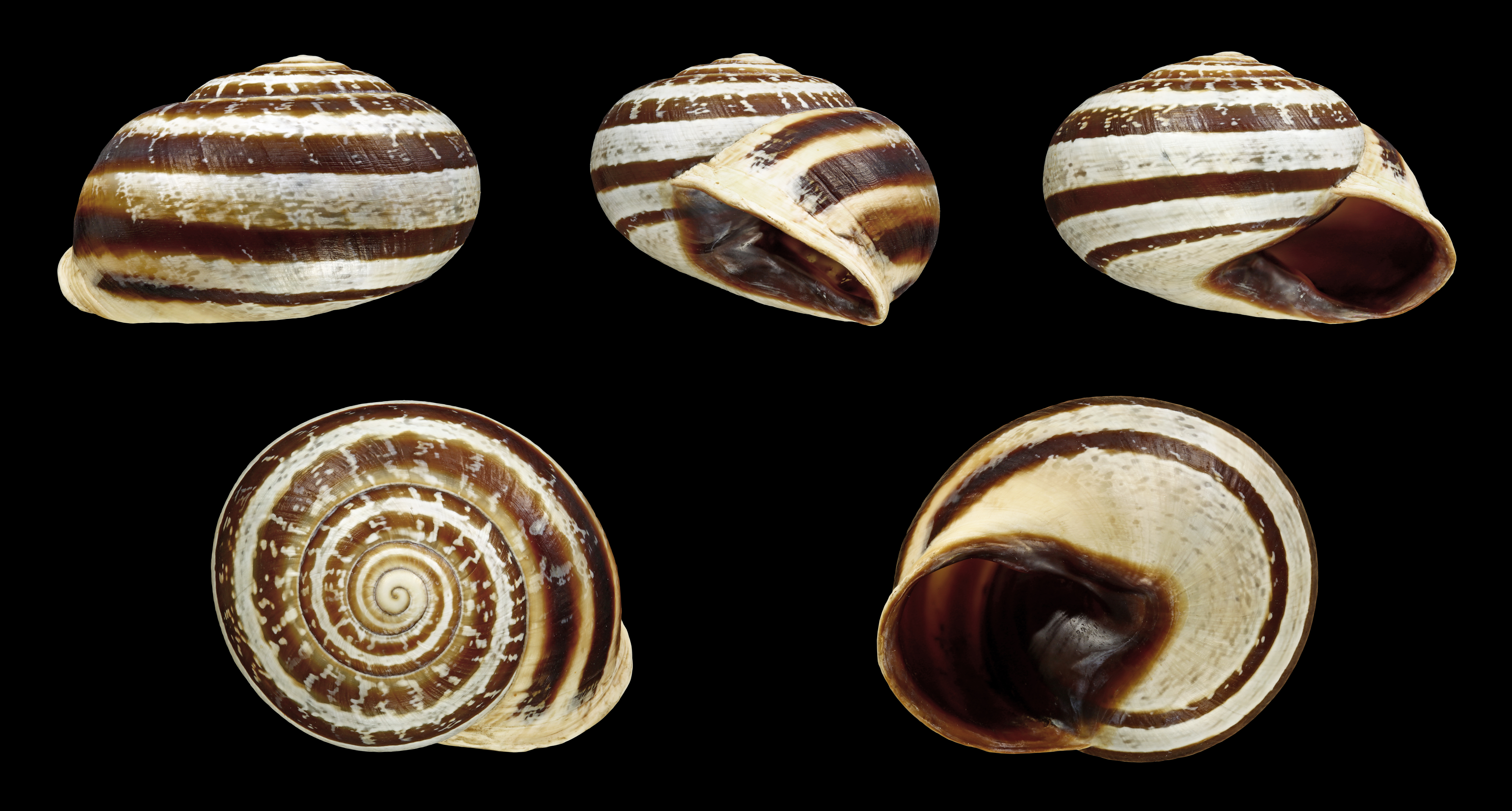
- Five views of a shell of Otala lactea

Conservation status
- Least Concern (IUCN 3.1) (Europe regional assessment)

- Secure (NatureServe)

Scientific classification
- Kingdom: Animalia
- Phylum: Mollusca
- Class: Gastropoda
- Order: Stylommatophora
- Family: Helicidae
- Subfamily: Helicinae
- Tribe: Thebini
- Genus: Otala
- Species: O. lactea

Binomial name
- Otala lactea (Müller, 1774)

Synonyms
- Archelix ahmarina (Bourguignat in Pechaud, 1883) (superseded generic combination); Archelix ahmarina var. ibrahimi Pallary, 1922 (original combination); Archelix ahmarina var. ksebiana Pallary, 1915 (original combination); Archelix barbini Pallary, 1918 (original combination); Archelix barbini var. coloria Pallary, 1918 (original combination); Archelix barbini var. major Pallary, 1926 (original combination); Archelix barbini var. persimilis Pallary, 1918 (original combination); Archelix bleicheri (Paladilhe, 1875) (superseded generic combination); Archelix bleicheri var. minor Pallary, 1922 (original combination); Archelix ceardi Pallary, 1924 (original combination); Archelix connollyi Pallary, 1926 (original combination); Archelix de gouttesiana Pallary, 1928 (original combination); Archelix de gouttesiana var. minor Pallary, 1928 (original combination); Archelix de gouttesiana var. pallida Pallary, 1928 (original combination); Archelix derenica Pallary, 1920 (original combination); Archelix fauxnigra Pallary, 1920 (original combination); Archelix fauxnigra var. unicolor-alba Pallary, 1920 (original combination); Archelix freydieri Pallary, 1923 (original combination); Archelix freydieri var. minor Pallary, 1926 (original combination); Archelix freydieri var. unifasciata Pallary, 1926 (original combination); Archelix gebiletana Pallary, 1918 (original combination); Archelix gebiletana var. minor Pallary, 1919 (original combination); Archelix huotiana Pallary, 1926 (original combination); Archelix ibrahimi (Bourguignat in Pechaud, 1883) (superseded generic combination); Archelix liocephala Pallary, 1923 (original combination); Archelix lucasi A. Férussac & Deshayes, 1848 (superseded generic combination); Archelix lucasi var. discolor Pallary, 1926 (original combination); Archelix solignaci Pallary, 1926 (original combination); Archelix sphaeromorpha (Bourguignat in Pechaud, 1883) (superseded generic combination); Archelix sphaeromorpha var. albicans Pallary, 1920 (original combination); Archelix sphaeromorpha var. depressa Pallary, 1920 (original combination); Archelix sphaeromorpha var. lineolata Pallary, 1920 (original combination); Archelix sphaeromorpha var. minor Pallary, 1920 (original combination); Archelix sphaeromorpha var. quinque-fasciata Pallary, 1920 (original combination); Archelix sphaeromorpha var. subangulata Pallary, 1920 (original combination); Helix ahmarina J. Mabille 1883; Helix bleicheri Paladilhe, 1875 (junior synonym); Helix canariensis Mousson 1872; Helix ibrahimi Bourguignat in Pechaud, 1883 (junior synonym); Helix jacquemetana J. Mabille 1883; Helix lactea O.F. Muller 1774 (original description); Helix lactea var. murcica Rossmässler, 1854 (junior synonym); Helix lucasi A. Férussac & Deshayes, 1848 (junior synonym); Helix plesiasteia Bourguignat in Pechaud, 1884 (junior synonym); Helix sphaeromorpha Bourguignat in Pechaud, 1883 (junior synonym); Otala (Otala) lactea (O. F. Müller, 1774)· accepted, alternate representation; Otala (Otala) lactea lactea (O. F. Müller, 1774) (superseded combination); Otala (Otala) lactea murcica (Rossmässler, 1854) (superseded combination); Otala lactea murcica (Rossmässler, 1854) (superseded combination)

= Otala lactea =

Species of gastropod

Otala lactea, known as the milk snail or Spanish snail, is a large, edible species of air-breathing land snail, a terrestrial pulmonate gastropod mollusk, in the family Helicidae, the typical snails.

Archaeological recovery at the Ancient Roman site of Volubilis, in Morocco, illustrates prehistoric consumption of O. lactea by humans.

== Distribution ==
This species of snail is native to the western Mediterranean Basin in the southern Iberian Peninsula, Morocco, Algeria, Balearic and Canary Islands, Malta and Corsica. It has been introduced to the Azores, Madeira, United States, including Arizona, California, Florida, and Texas, and to Bermuda, Cuba, and southeastern Australia.

== Anatomy ==
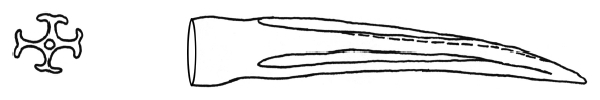
love dart of Otala lactea.

This snail creates and uses love darts as part of its courtship behaviour, prior to mating. The shell of the snail plays an important role on its quality of life. This is because the calcium in the snails shell allows for shell regeneration to take place, if the shell was ever to be broken.

O. lactea has developed the evolutionary adaptation of estivation to help it deal with harsh conditions such as drought or famine. During this time, O. lactea suppresses its metabolism. This affects many of the body functions. On a cellular level, this conversion from normal to estivation is seen impacting the Na^{+}/K^{+}-ATPase function. The Na^{+}/K^{+}-ATPase activity has been shown to be significantly reduced during estivation. As the Na^{+}/K^{+}-ATPase pump uses quite a lot of ATP, the suppression of this pump plays a key role in the conversion to estivation in the O. lactea.
