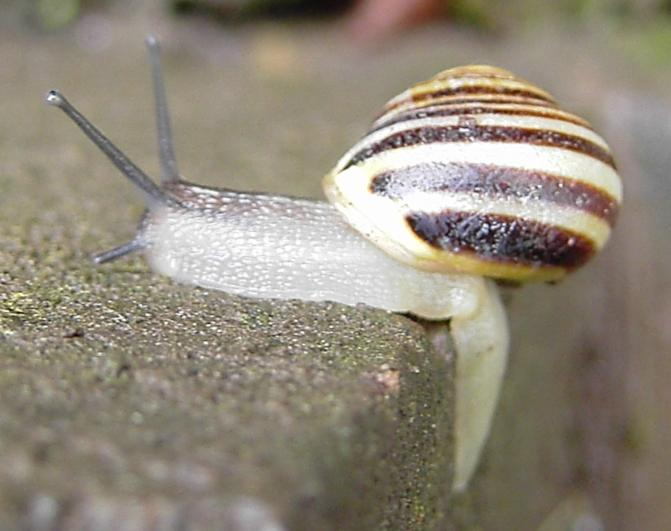
- White-lipped snail Cepaea hortensis

Scientific classification
- Kingdom: Animalia
- Phylum: Mollusca
- Class: Gastropoda
- Order: Stylommatophora
- Family: Helicidae
- Subfamily: Helicinae
- Tribe: Allognathini
- Genus: Cepaea; Held, 1838

Type species
- Helix nemoralis Linnaeus, 1758

Synonyms
- Cepaea (Cepaea) Held, 1838; Helix (Tachea) W. Turton, 1831 (Invalid: junior homonym of Tachea Fleming, 1822 [Aves]); Hystrionica Scudder, 1882

= Cepaea =

Genus of gastropods

Cepaea is a genus of large air-breathing land snails, terrestrial pulmonate gastropod molluscs in the family Helicidae. The shells are often brightly coloured and patterned with brown stripes. The two living species in this genus, C. nemoralis and C. hortensis, are widespread and common in Western and Central Europe. In North America, C. hortensis is native on the northeast coast, but both species have been introduced elsewhere, and they are also spreading further east in Europe. Both have been influential model species for ongoing studies of genetics and natural selection. Like many Helicidae, these snails use love darts during mating.

== Species ==
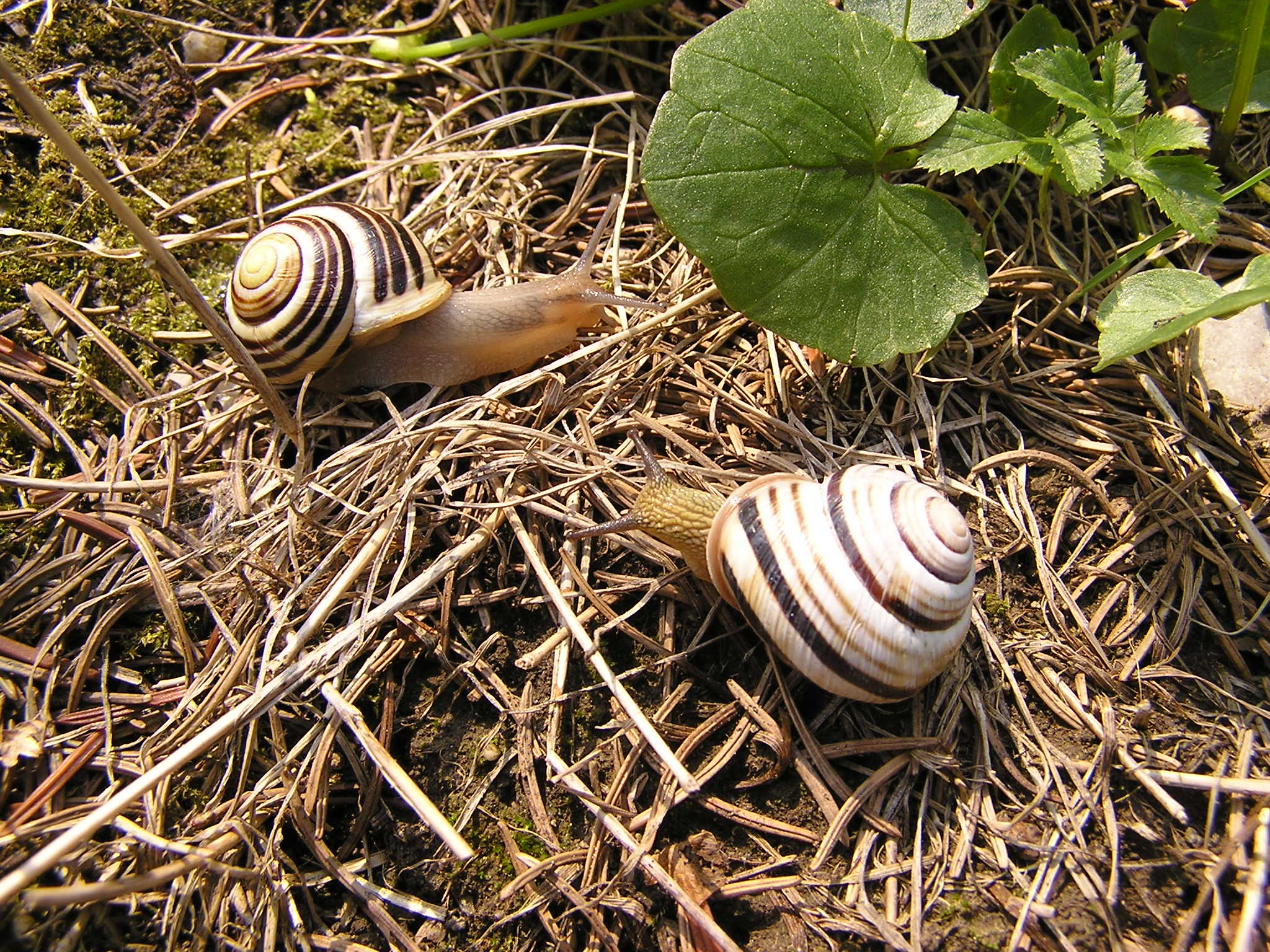
A comparison between Cepaea hortensis (left) and Caucasotachea vindobonensis (right)

For a long time, four living species were classified in the genus Cepaea. However, molecular phylogenetic studies suggested that two of them should be placed in the genera Macularia and Caucasotachea, which are not immediate relatives of either Cepaea or each other:

- Cepaea hortensis (O. F. Müller, 1774) – white-lipped snail or garden banded snail
- Cepaea nemoralis (Linnaeus, 1758) – brown-lipped snail or grove snail
- Cepaea sylvatica (Draparnaud, 1801), now Macularia sylvatica
- Cepaea vindobonensis (Férussac, 1821), now Caucasotachea vindobonensis

Several other fossil species have been described.

== Interspecific relations ==
The range of C. hortensis extends further north than that of C. nemoralis in Scotland and Scandinavia and it is the only one of the two species in Iceland and the only one native to North America. Likewise in the Swiss Alps C. hortensis is found as high as 2050 m, but C. nemoralis only up to 1600 m. Conversely, the southern edge of the range lies further north in C. hortensis; unlike C. nemoralis it does not occur in Italy, and in Spain it has a more restricted distribution (in the north-east corner).

Where the ranges overlap C. hortensis prefers cooler sites with longer and damper vegetation. But the two species often co-occur at a site, in which situation the densities of both affect each other's growth, fecundity and mortality. However, they differ somewhat in their behaviour: C. hortensis is more active at lower temperatures, aestivates higher on the vegetation and is more diurnal, although this appears to be independent of whether the other species is present or not.

When given no choice of partner in the laboratory, the two Cepaea species can form hybrids, which will backcross with the parental species, but the fertility is very low.

== Shell polymorphism ==
=== Description and genetics ===
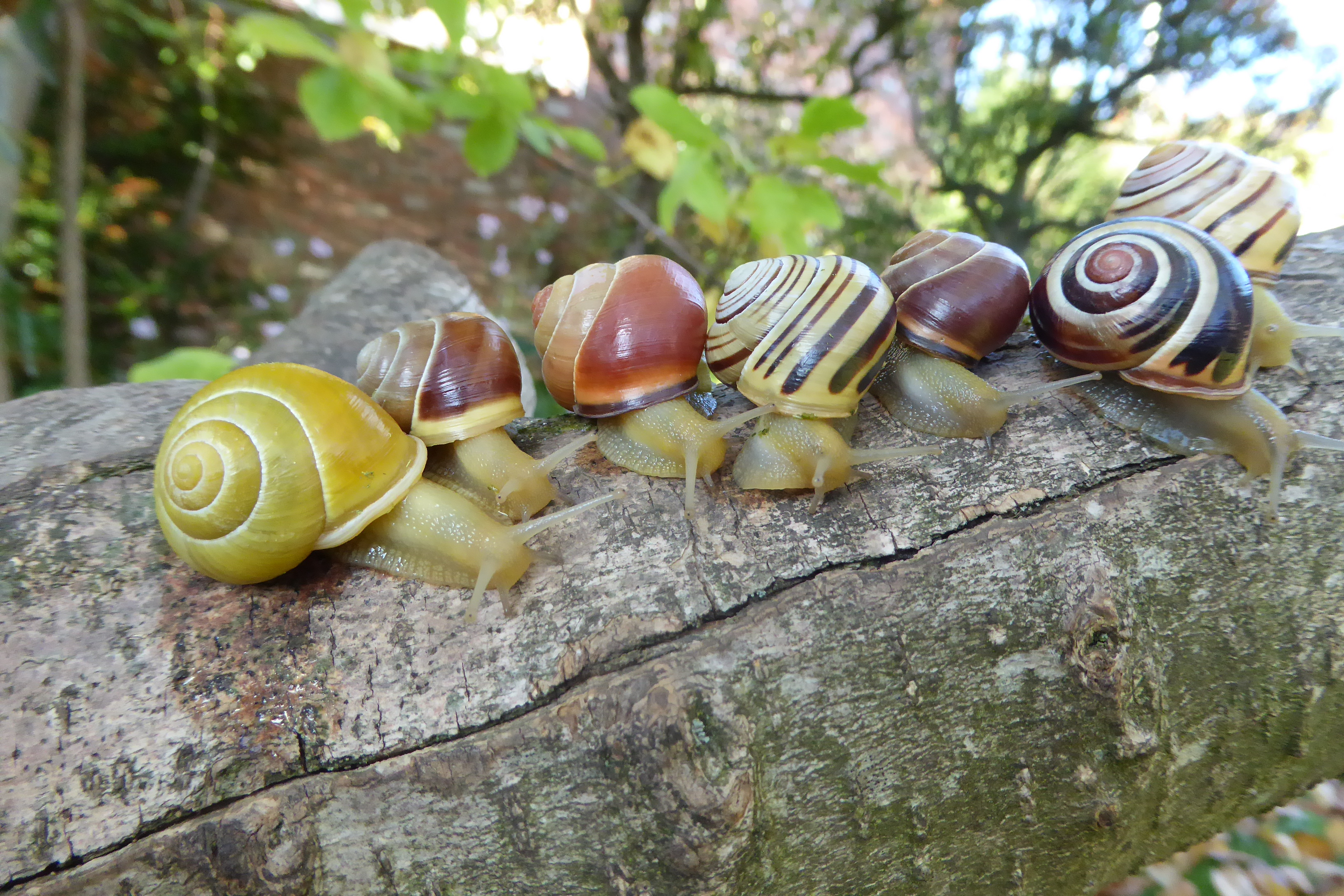
Cepaea nemoralis, showing colour and banding polymorphisms

The two Cepaea species share a genetic polymorphism for the colour and banding pattern of the shell.

The background colour of the shell ranges from dark brown, through pink to yellow or even approaching white. This variation is continuous, but there are peaks in the distribution corresponding to brown, pink and yellow morphs. The colour is mainly determined by alleles at a single locus with brown dominant to pink, which is dominant to yellow.

Up to five bands (very rarely more) run spirally around the shell, numbered 1 to 5 with the larger numbers further from the shell apex. The conventional scoring annotation is to write 12345 if all bands are present and separated, but to replace a number with 0 if a band is absent from its usual position and to enclose numbers in parentheses if bands are fused with their neighbours. Thus 003(45) would mean that the top two bands are absent and the lower two fused.

A dominant allele at one locus causes the absence of all bands, a dominant allele at another locus causes the loss of all bands except band 3, and a dominant allele at a third locus causes the loss of just bands 1 and 2. The first of these three loci is closely linked to the locus determining shell colour, to another influencing the spread of the band pigment, and to one determining the colour of the lip and bands. This collection of linked loci are part of a supergene. A consequence of this arrangement is that the shells of different background colours within a population often exhibit different ratios of banded to unbanded shells: this is an example of linkage disequilibrium.

The bands are usually dark brown, but this is affected by genes influencing intensity and colouration (e.g. black or orange). Another locus (part of the supergene) determines whether the band is continuous or forms a sequence of spots. The genetics underlying the fusion of adjacent bands is not well understood.

=== Evolutionary explanations ===
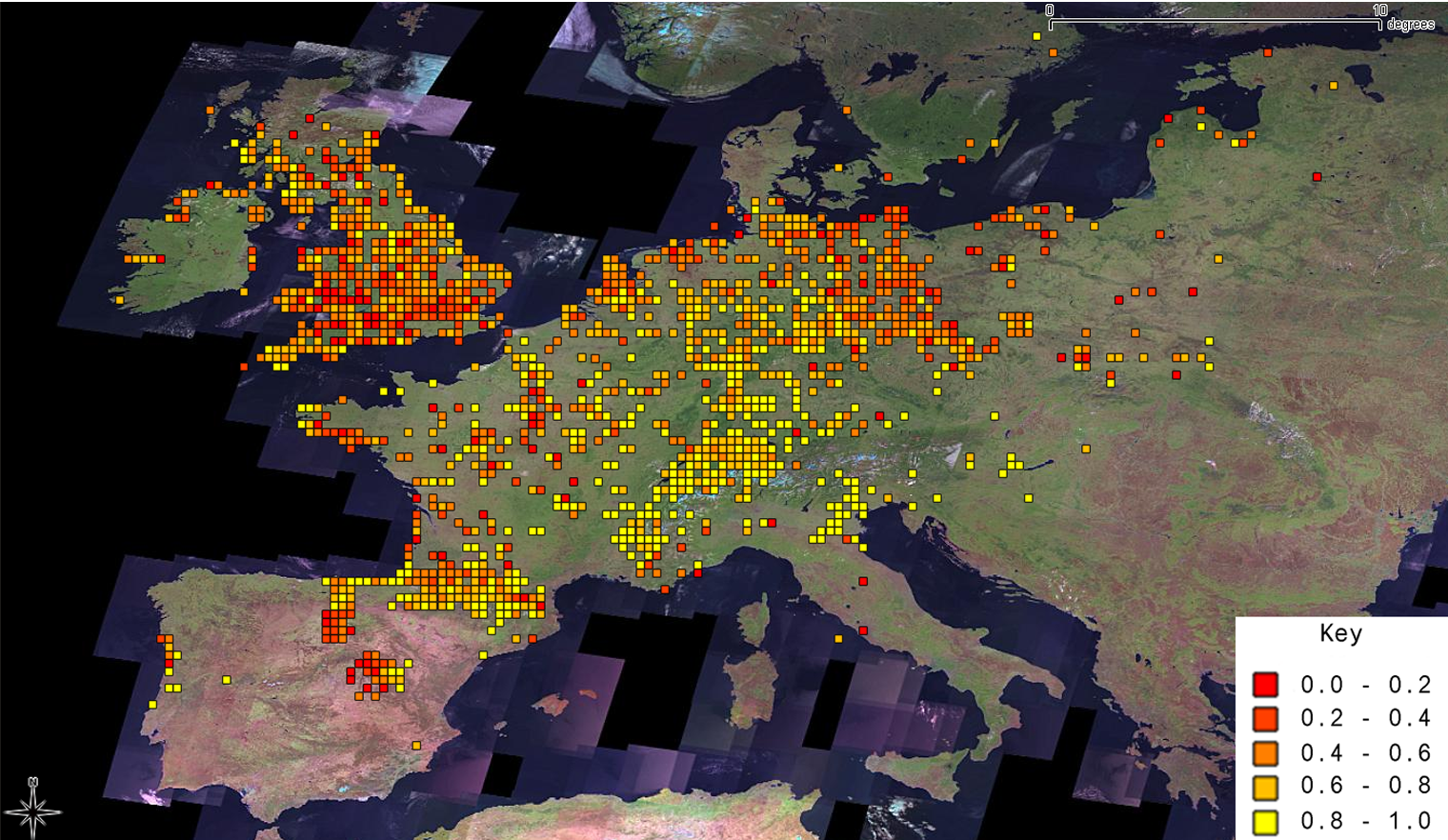
Proportion of C. nemoralis shells that are yellow

In both species, most populations exhibit polymorphism in one or more of these shell characters. Nevertheless, statistically we can detect systematic variation at continental scales, and also between habitats, and at various scales down to a few tens of metres. There is also statistical evidence of change with time, based both on comparisons between sub-fossil and modern shells, and on resampling the same sites some decades apart, although the latter has more often found little change over the period (stasis). Very much research in ecological genetics has addressed the reasons for both the variation and the systematic trends.

The two selection pressures that might most feasibly act on the appearance of shells are climatic selection and predation. Darker shells heat up more quickly in the sun, which might well be advantageous for cold-blooded animals in shaded woodland but risks causing overheating and death in open habitats. This trade-off is also presumed to be responsible for the greater proportion of yellow C. nemoralis to the south, but it is curious why the trend is not present in C. hortensis. Contrary to predictions, recent global warming has not led to a detectable increase in yellow morphs on a continental scale. The use of photosensitive paint has shown that paler morphs spend more time exposed to the sun, which may imply that the shell polymorphism allows different morphs to coexist at a site by occupying different microhabitats.

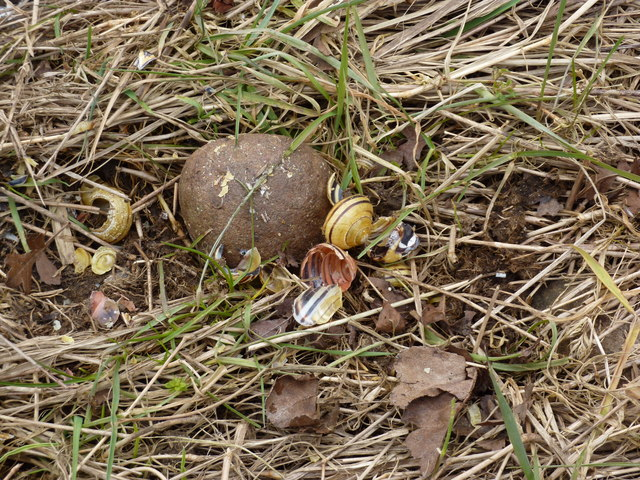
Song thrush anvil with broken Cepaea shells

Both temperature regulation and predation make the same prediction of pale shells in open habitats and dark shells in woodland, so—although the prediction has often been confirmed—it is difficult to test which is the more important explanation. However, song thrushes (Turdus philomelos) break open Cepaea shells on stones ("anvils"), allowing a comparison of those they predate with those present in the local environment. Besides the directional selection favouring camouflaged individuals, visually searching predators might cause apostatic selection. The hypothesis is that they form a search image for the commonest morphs, favouring whichever morphs are locally rare, thus promoting diversity. As well as its visual effect, the shell pigments are associated with differences in shell strength, so may affect predation by predators searching non-visually, for instance at night.

Several studies have demonstrated a predicted evolutionary response of shell appearance to a change of habitat. However, the association of shell appearance and habitat is not always consistent, especially in more disturbed environments, so it is believed that random effects are also influential, particularly founder effects. The two Cepaea species colonised much of Europe only within the last 4000 generations, so the time available for selection to act has been limited, and local anthropogenetic disturbances must often have reversed which morphs are optimal. Moreover, snails disperse more slowly than many other animals, so the most suitable genes may be locally absent.

For instance, biologists were at one time puzzled by the phenomenon of "area effects"; the same morph of Cepaea may be found consistently over a wide area but in adjacent areas of similar habitat a different set of morphs predominate instead, with a sharp transition between. The explanation accepted nowadays is that relatively recently a change of habitat allowed the rapid colonisation of vacant areas by descendants of a few founder individuals until the colony had expanded out to areas occupied by other populations; subsequently intraspecific competition slowed the dispersal of genes into the neighbouring, occupied areas. Nevertheless, occasional transfer of genes between areas of different habitat is proposed to be important in maintaining the local diversity of phenotypes.
