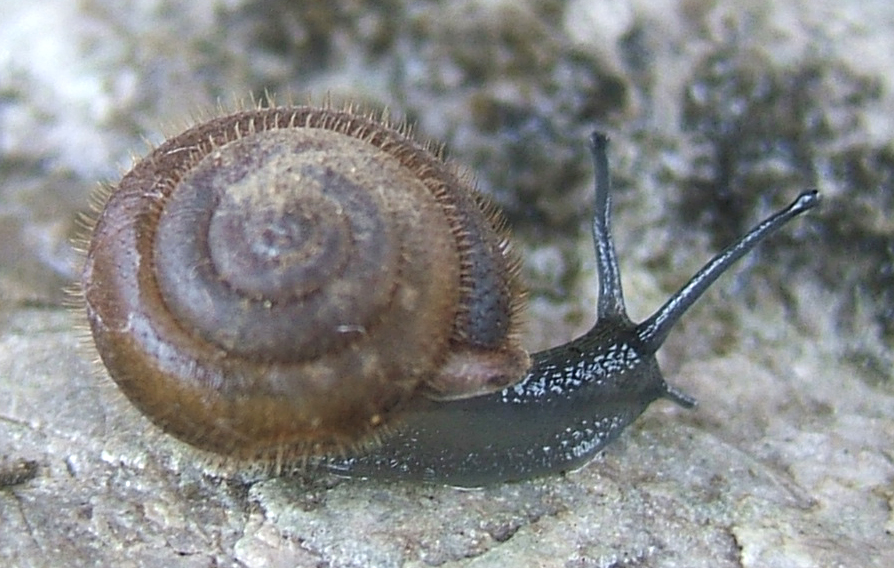
- A live individual of Isognomostoma isognomostomos

Scientific classification
- Kingdom: Animalia
- Phylum: Mollusca
- Class: Gastropoda
- Order: Stylommatophora
- Family: Helicidae
- Genus: Isognomostoma
- Species: I. isognomostomos

Binomial name
- Isognomostoma isognomostomos (Schröter, 1784)

= Isognomostoma isognomostomos =

Species of gastropod

Isognomostoma isognomostomos is a species of air-breathing land snail, a terrestrial pulmonate gastropod mollusk in the family Helicidae, the typical snails.

== Distribution ==
This species is found in the Czech Republic, Latvia, Poland, Slovakia, Ukraine and other countries.
