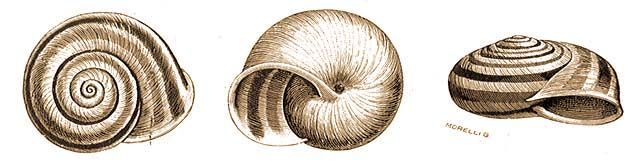
- Three views of a shell of Cattania trizona

Conservation status
- Least Concern (IUCN 3.1)

Scientific classification
- Kingdom: Animalia
- Phylum: Mollusca
- Class: Gastropoda
- Order: Stylommatophora
- Family: Helicidae
- Genus: Cattania
- Species: C. trizona

Binomial name
- Cattania trizona (Rossmässler, 1835)

Synonyms
- Camplylaea trizona (Rossmässler, 1835); Helicigona trizona (Rossmässler, 1835); Chilostoma trizona (Rossmässler, 1835); Helix (Campylaea) trizona (Rossmässler, 1835) superseded combination; Helix trizona Rossmässler, 1835

= Cattania trizona =

Species of gastropod

Cattania trizona is a species of small air-breathing land snail, a terrestrial gastropod mollusc in the family Helicidae, the true snails.

== Distribution ==
This species is listed in IUCN red list as a Least Concern species.

It occurs in countries including:

- Hungary
