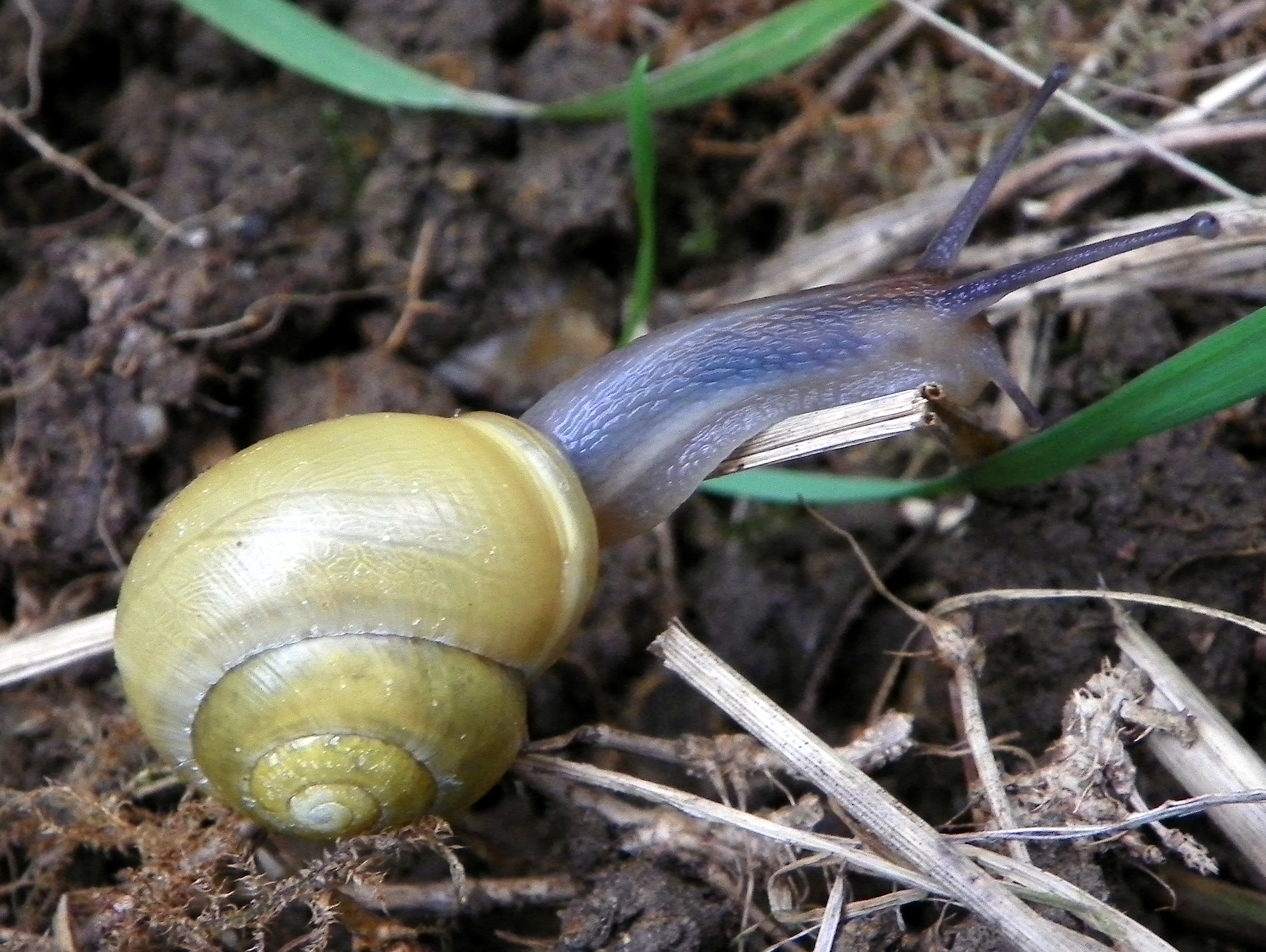

Conservation status
- Least Concern (IUCN 3.1)

- Secure (NatureServe)

Scientific classification
- Kingdom: Animalia
- Phylum: Mollusca
- Class: Gastropoda
- Order: Stylommatophora
- Family: Helicidae
- Genus: Cepaea
- Species: C. hortensis

Binomial name
- Cepaea hortensis (O.F. Müller, 1774)

= White-lipped snail =

Species of gastropod

The white-lipped snail or garden banded snail, scientific name Cepaea hortensis, is a large species of air-breathing land snail, a terrestrial pulmonate gastropod mollusc in the family Helicidae. The only other species in the genus is Cepaea nemoralis.

== Description ==
Cepaea hortensis has a shell up to 22 mm (1 in) in diameter, tending to be slightly smaller than C. nemoralis. The umbilicus is closed in adults, but narrowly open in juveniles. Although the shells of C. hortensis are most commonly yellow, they exhibit a range of background colours from brown through pink to pale yellow, and up to five brown bands may be present, some of which may fuse with their neighbours. This polymorphism, which is shared with Cepaea nemoralis, has been the subject of considerable research.

This species of snail creates and uses love darts during mating.

The size of the egg is 2 mm.

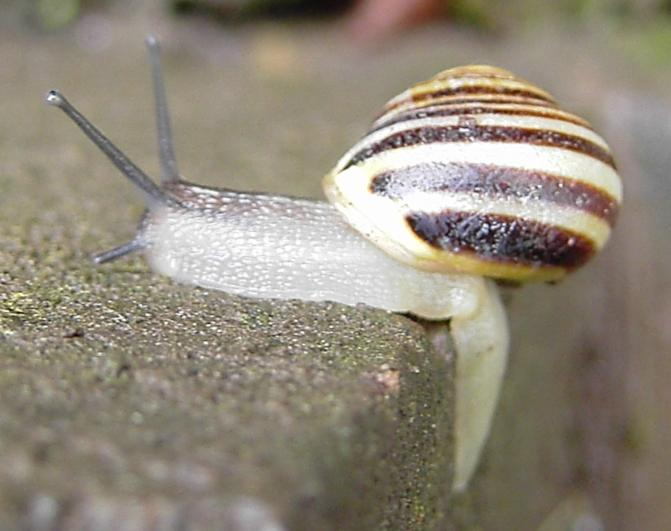
Cepaea hortensis

Specimen in the United Kingdom

Yellow shell with five unfused bands

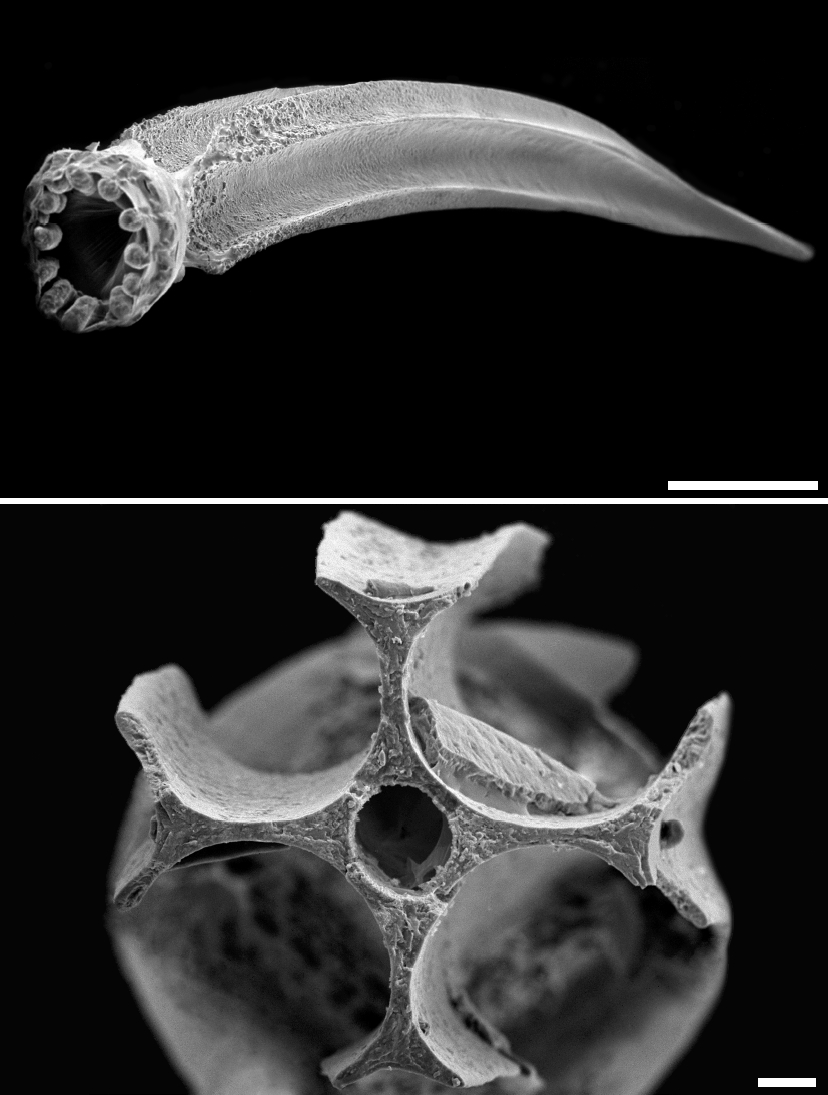
C. hortensis love dart (0.5 mm scale bar above and 50 μm below)

=== Similar species ===
In most areas adults of C. hortensis can be distinguished by the pale colouration of the lip around the shell aperture, whereas it is typically brown in C. nemoralis. But in some areas (e.g. Ireland, Pyrenees) C. nemoralis can have a white lip, and C. hortensis can rarely have a brown lip. More certain characters require dissection. A cross section of the love dart of C. hortensis shows a cross with bifurcated blades, whereas that of C. nemoralis is a simple cross. The mucous gland has 4 or more branches in C. hortensis, but 3 or fewer branches in C. nemoralis.

Caucasotachea vindobonensis and Macularia sylvatica are two superficially similar species formerly mistakenly included in the genus Cepaea. Both have a lip that is brown near the columella becoming pale towards the suture, and they have fine growth ridges on the shell whereas in both Cepaea species it is smooth.

== Distribution and habitat ==
The native distribution of this species is Western and Central Europe. Also its occurrence along the coast of northeastern North America should be considered native, since archaeological deposits reveal it to have been present at least 7850 years ago, so before the presence of Viking explorers. The range of C. hortensis extends further north in Scotland than that of C. nemoralis and it is the only Cepaea species in Iceland and northern parts of Scandinavia (up to 67° 30' N). Conversely, the southern limit of C. hortensis is also further north: in Spain it occurs only in the north-east and it is absent from Italy. Cepaea hortensis has been recently introduced to the Moscow region of Russia and to Ukraine, but has not established itself as widely as C. nemoralis. It reaches an altitude of 2050 m in the Swiss Alps.

The two Cepaea species share many of the same habitats, such as woods, dunes and grassland, but the white-lipped snail tolerates wetter and colder areas.
