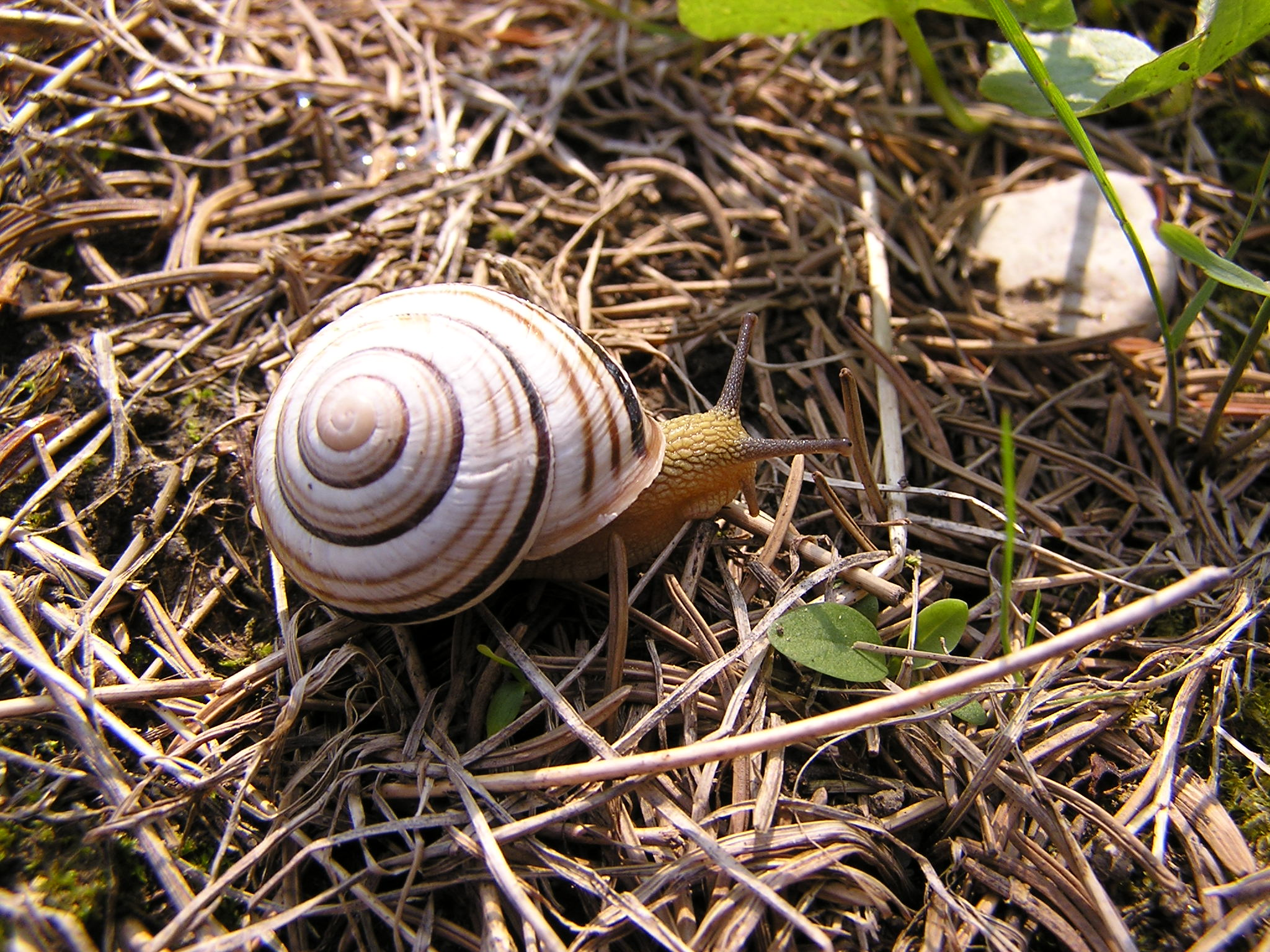

Conservation status
- Least Concern (IUCN 3.1)

Scientific classification
- Kingdom: Animalia
- Phylum: Mollusca
- Class: Gastropoda
- Order: Stylommatophora
- Family: Helicidae
- Genus: Caucasotachea
- Species: C. vindobonensis

Binomial name
- Caucasotachea vindobonensis (C. Pfeiffer, 1828)

= Caucasotachea vindobonensis =

Species of gastropod

Caucasotachea vindobonensis is a large species of air-breathing land snail, a terrestrial pulmonate gastropod in the family Helicidae.

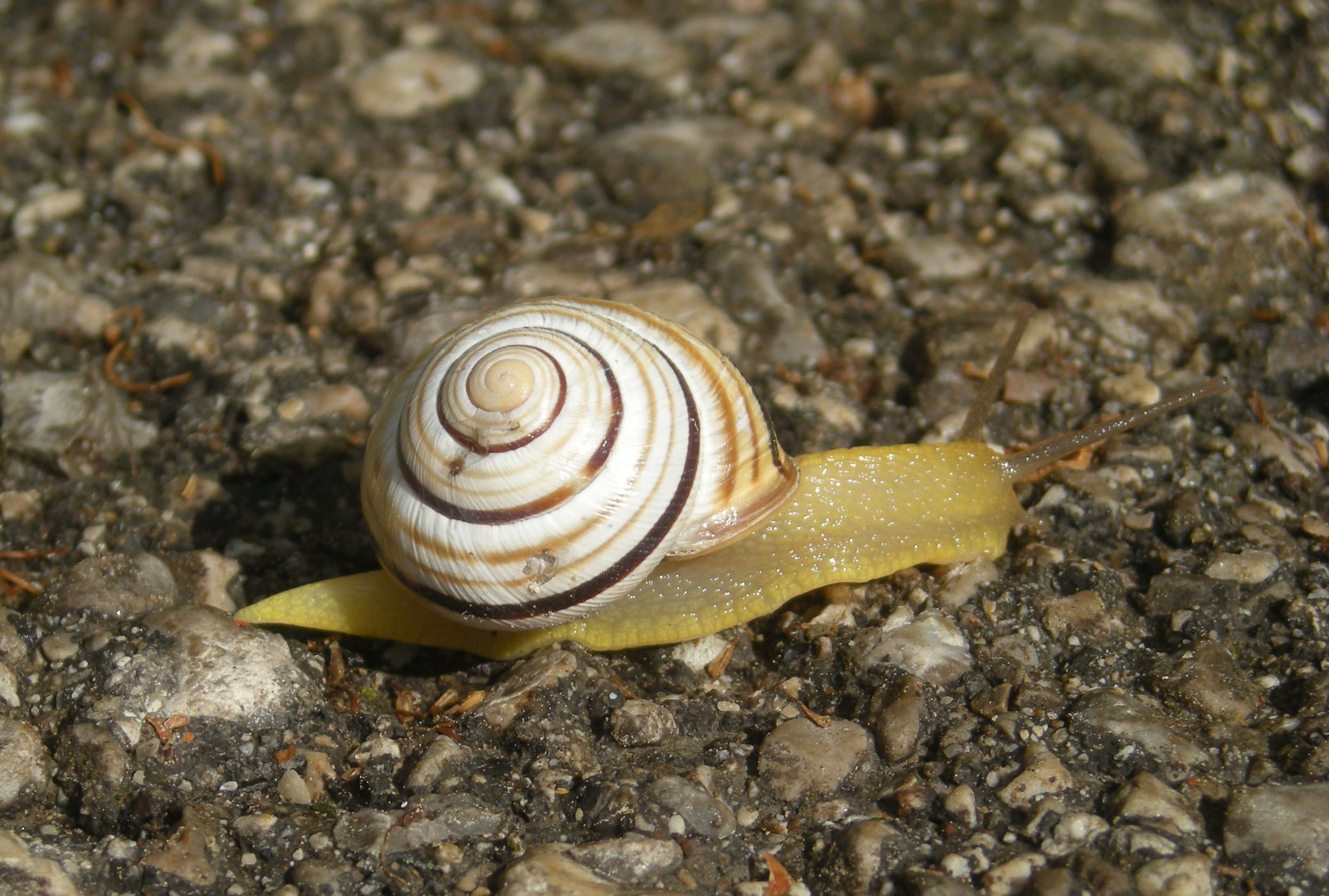
Caucasotachea vindobonensis photographed in Mödling, near Vienna

The scientific name is derived from the Celtic settlement Vindobona, now known as Vienna, the capital of Austria. This species was formerly assigned to the genus Cepaea. However, DNA sequences revealed that this species is not closely related to Cepaea, but belongs instead to the genus Caucasotachea.

== Description ==
The right-hand coiled, globular shell of C. vindobonensis is 17–21 mm high and 20–25 mm broad with 5.5–6 whorls. In adults, the umbilicus is completely covered. The lip is brown at its inner end becoming pale towards the suture; this distinguishes it from the conchological similar Cepaea hortensis (usually pure white lip) and Cepaea nemoralis (usually a dark brown lip), with which C. vindobonensis often co-occurs. Another difference is that the shell C. vindobonensis has fine growth ridges whereas those of Cepaea are smooth. The shell is whitish or yellowish, with typically 5 brown stripes, of which the upper two are usually weak. The lowermost stripe is nearer to the columella than in Cepaea. There is a slight variation of shell colour within this species (see below). The animal itself is yellowish with grey tentacles.

Examples of variation in shell colour of C. vindobonensis
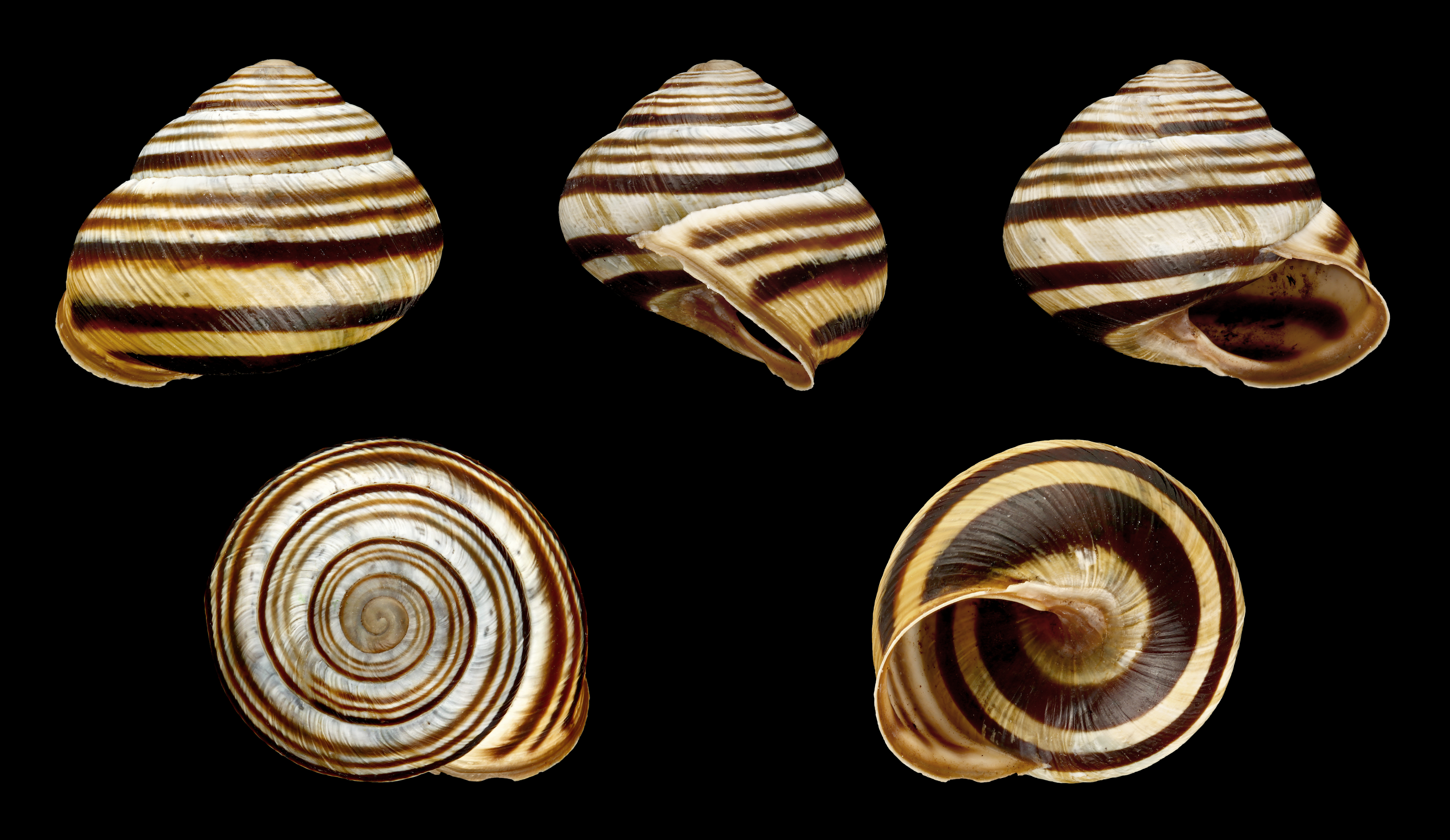

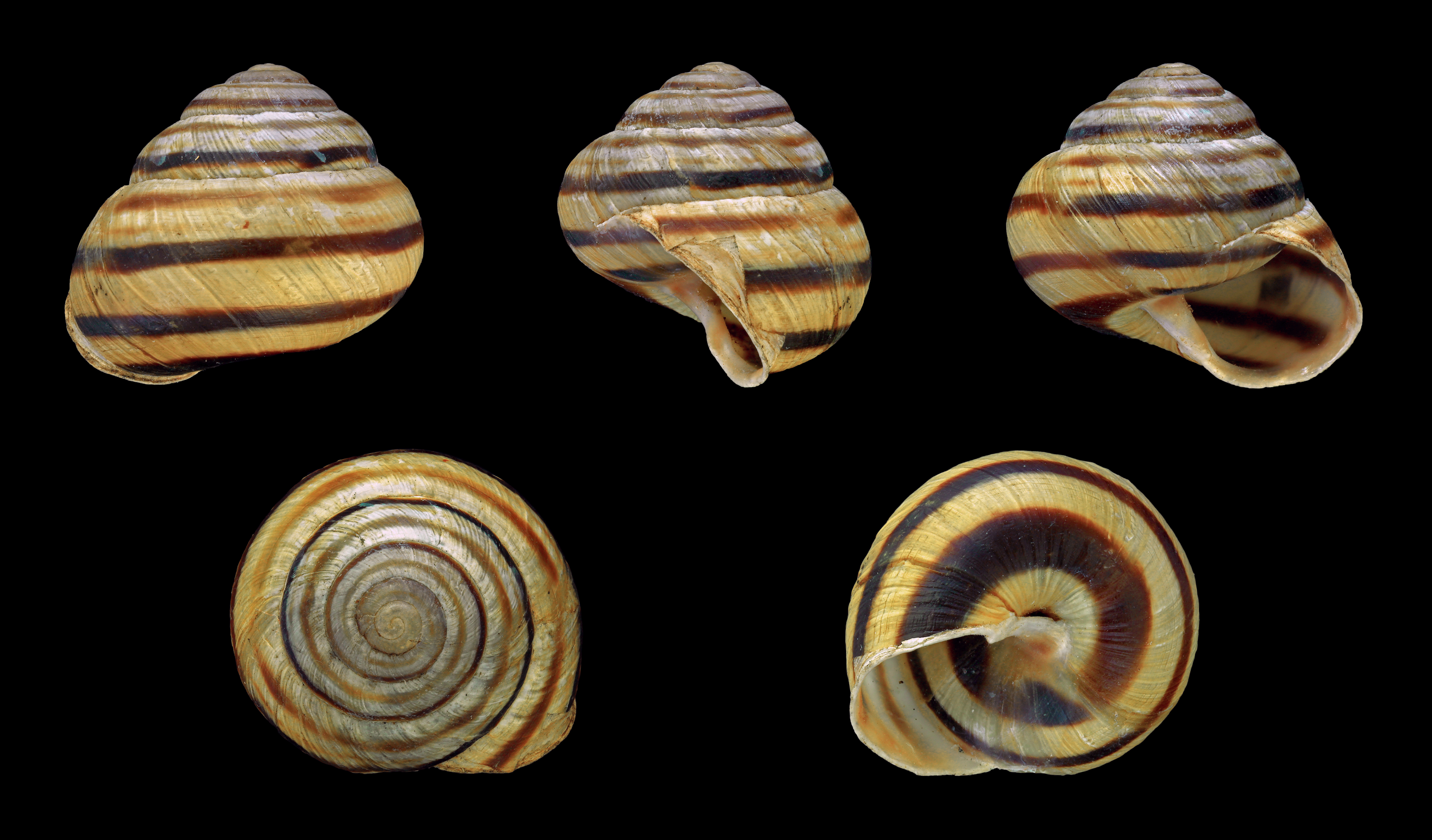

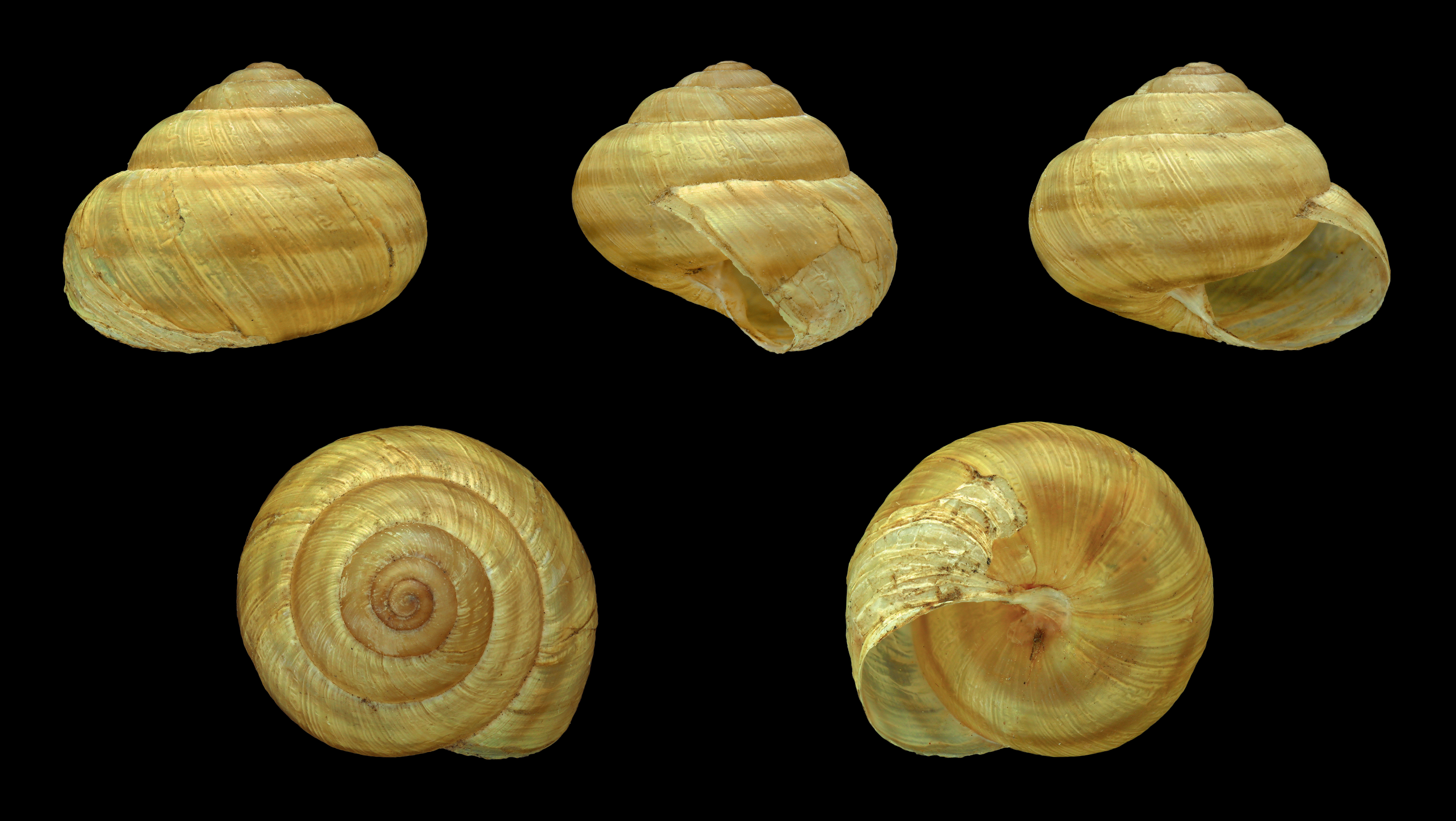

== Distribution and habitat ==
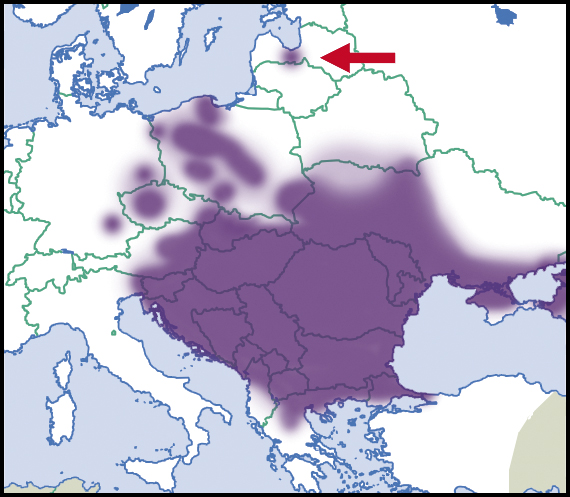
Distribution of C. vindobonensis in Europe (modified after Welter-Schultes)

The native distribution of this species is Pontic, Pannonian and Balkanian.

It occurs in Albania, Austria, Bulgaria, Bosnia and Herzegovina, Croatia, Czech Republic (near threatened (NT)), Germany (reintroduced), Greece, Hungary, Italy, Latvia, Moldova, Poland, North Macedonia, Romania, Slovakia, Russia (Rostov Oblast, Stavropol Krai, Krasnodar Krai; Moscow Region as an introduction) Serbia, Slovenia, and Ukraine.

Introduced populations in the United States (New York State) have been known since 2015 and in Canada (Quebec) since 2020.

The original habitat of C. vindobonensis was most probably open forests in the Balkans, from where it spread over large parts of Central and Eastern Europe after the last glaciation. Nevertheless, it also dwells in several grassland habitats like meadows, steppe and ruderal areas, especially in the north of its distribution area. The highest vertical occurrence is about 1,600 m (5,250 ft) asl in Southern Bulgaria.

== Life cycle ==
All the following information originates from a Greek study. Because Greece is in the southernmost part of the distribution area, the phenology for this species might be quite different in the more northerly countries where it is found. Caucasotachea vindobonensis becomes mature after its second year and can reach a maximum life span of about 7 years. The reproductive period lasts from April to June, with a maximum in May. Each year, adults lay about 50 eggs, about 3 mm in diameter, and the juveniles hatch out after 18 days. During hot summer days, these snails rest attached to leaves or the stems of tall plants. Hibernation commences at the end of October to the beginning of November, and the snails come out of hibernation in March.
