= Idiomela subplicata =

Conservation status
- Vulnerable (IUCN 3.1)

Scientific classification
- Kingdom: Animalia
- Phylum: Mollusca
- Class: Gastropoda
- Order: Stylommatophora
- Family: Helicidae
- Genus: Idiomela
- Species: I. subplicata

Binomial name
- Idiomela subplicata Sowerby, 1824

Species of gastropod

Idiomela subplicata is a species of medium-sized air-breathing land snail, a terrestrial pulmonate gastropods in the family Helicidae, the typical snails.

This species is endemic to the Madeira archipelago, Portugal, where it only occurs on the islet Ilhéu de Baixo off Porto Santo Island.

It is mentioned in annexes II and IV of the Habitats Directive.
