= Tyrrheniberus =

Scientific classification
- Kingdom: Animalia
- Phylum: Mollusca
- Class: Gastropoda
- Order: Stylommatophora
- Family: Helicidae
- Subfamily: Murellinae
- Genus: Tyrrheniberus; Kobelt, 1904

Genus of gastropods

Tyrrheniberus is a genus of air-breathing land snails, terrestrial pulmonate gastropod mollusks in the family Helicidae.

== Distribution ==
They are found in Italy.

== Species ==
Species within the genus Tyrrheniberus include:

- Tyrrheniberus ridens (Martens, 1884)
- Tyrrheniberus sardonius (Martens, 1884) – type species
- Tyrrheniberus villicus (Paulucci, 1882)
