= Isaurica (gastropod) =

Scientific classification
- Kingdom: Animalia
- Phylum: Mollusca
- Class: Gastropoda
- Order: Stylommatophora
- Family: Helicidae
- Tribe: Helicini
- Genus: Isaurica; Kobelt, 1901

Genus of land snails

Isaurica is a genus of rock-dwelling gastropods belonging to the family Helicidae with a flattened shell. The species of this genus are found in the southwestern Anatolia.

Species:

- Isaurica callirhoe (Rolle, 1894)
- Isaurica lycia (Martens, 1889)
- Isaurica pamphylica Subai, 1994
- Isaurica riedeli Subai, 1994
- Isaurica schuetti Subai, 1994
