= Amanica praecellens =

Scientific classification
- Domain: Eukaryota
- Kingdom: Animalia
- Phylum: Mollusca
- Class: Gastropoda
- Order: Stylommatophora
- Family: Helicidae
- Genus: Amanica
- Species: A. praecellens

Binomial name
- Amanica praecellens Naegele, 1901

Species of snail

Amanica praecellens is a species of large, air-breathing land snail native to Nur (Amanos) Mountains in the Hatay Province of Turkey. It has a flattened, brown shell with an open umbilicus. It is the sole species of the genus.
