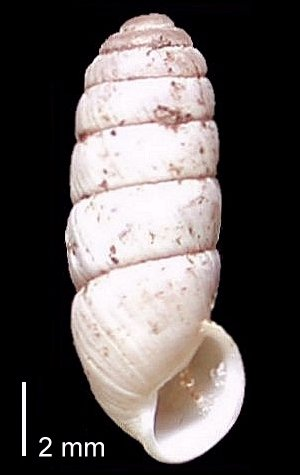
- Apertural view of a shell of Cylindrus obtusus

Conservation status
- Least Concern (IUCN 3.1)

Scientific classification
- Kingdom: Animalia
- Phylum: Mollusca
- Class: Gastropoda
- Order: Stylommatophora
- Family: Helicidae
- Genus: Cylindrus
- Species: C. obtusus

Binomial name
- Cylindrus obtusus (Draparnaud, 1805)

= Cylindrus obtusus =

Species of gastropod

Cylindrus obtusus is a species of air-breathing land snail, a terrestrial pulmonate gastropod mollusk in the family Helicidae, the typical snails.

This species is endemic to Austria. It lives on certain mountain tops in the Eastern Alps, in limestone habitats, e.g. the Dürrnstein, Ötscher and Gesäuse Mountains. It often lives crowded, in moss, in rock crevices.

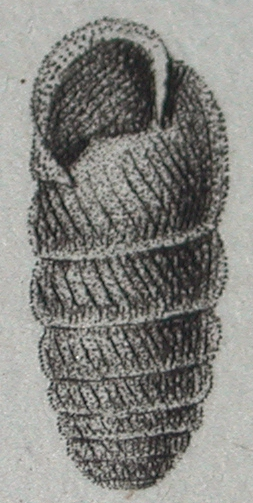
Drawing of shell of Cylindrus obtusus from its original description by Draparnaud in 1805.

== Ecology ==
The lifespan of Cylindrus obtusus is probably several years.

The dispersal rate of Cylindrus obtusus is about 3 cm per day.

== Reproduction ==
C. obtusus is one of the most prominent endemic snail species of the Eastern Alps. In the easternmost snail populations there is strong evidence for selfing (self-fertilization) as indicated by microsatellite data. In eastern populations, compared to western populations, mucous gland structures employed in sexual reproduction are highly variable and deformed suggesting that in selfing organisms the functionality of these structures is reduced.
