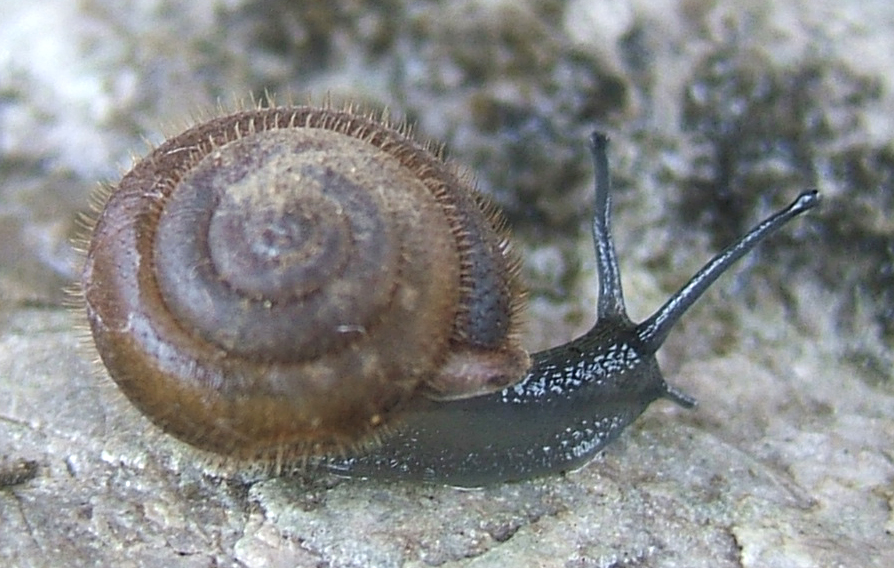
- A live individual of Isognomostoma isognomostomos

Scientific classification
- Kingdom: Animalia
- Phylum: Mollusca
- Class: Gastropoda
- Order: Stylommatophora
- Superfamily: Helicoidea
- Family: Helicidae
- Subfamily: Ariantinae
- Genus: Isognomostoma; Fitzinger, 1833

Type species
- Helix personata Lamarck, 1792

Synonyms
- Helix (Isognostoma) Fitzinger, 1833 (incorrect subsequent spelling and unaccepted rank); Plicostoma Schlüter, 1838

= Isognomostoma =

Genus of gastropods

Isognomostoma is a genus of air-breathing land snails, terrestrial pulmonate gastropod mollusk in the subfamily Ariantinae of the family Helicidae, the typical snails.

== Species ==
Species within the genus Isognomostoma include:

- Isognomostoma isognomostomos (Schröter, 1784)

Synonyms

- Isognomostoma holosericum (S. Studer, 1820): synonym of Causa holosericea (S. Studer, 1820)
- Isognomostoma isognomostoma (Schröter, 1784): synonym of Isognomostoma isognomostomos (Schröter, 1784)
