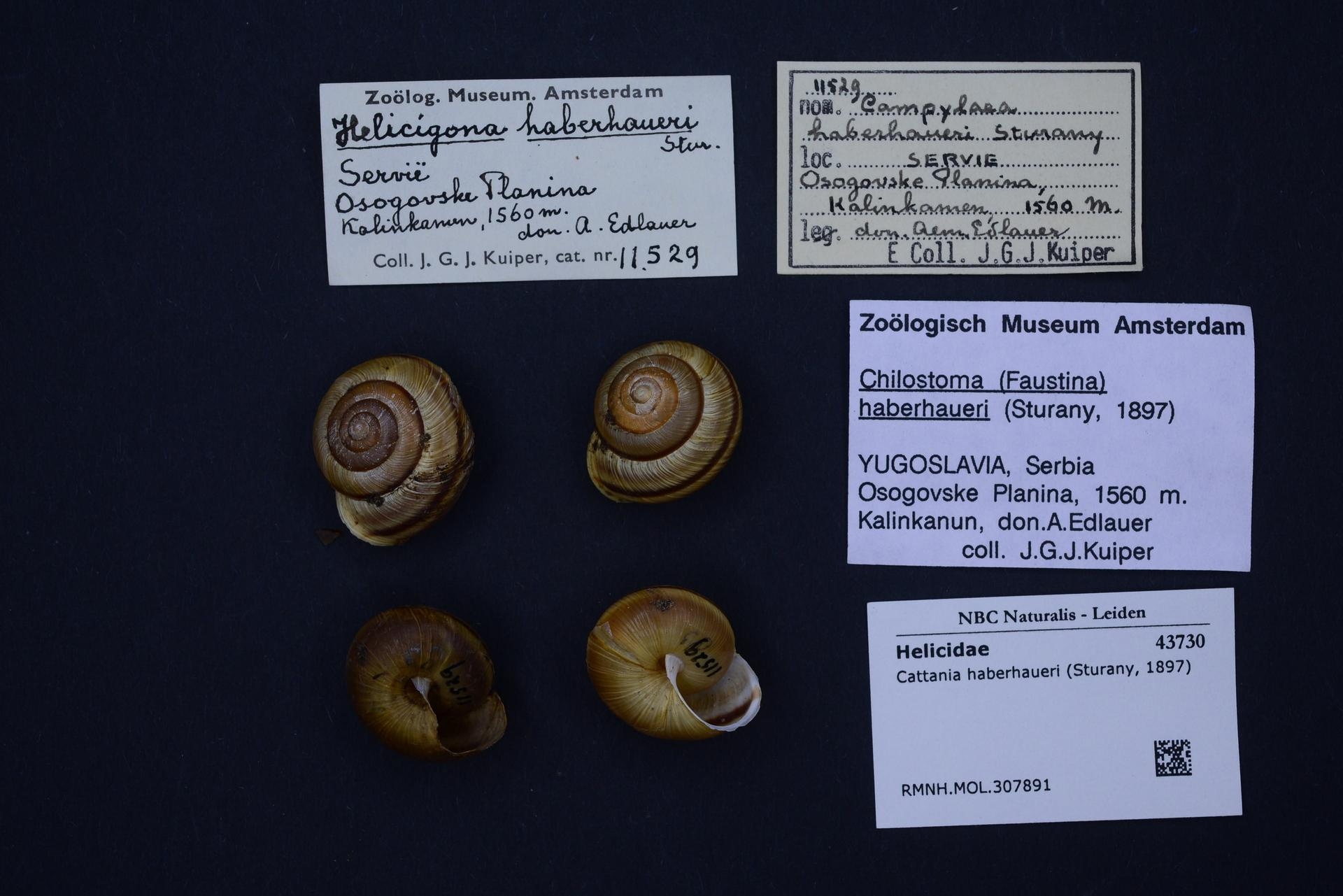
- Cattania haberhaueri

Scientific classification
- Kingdom: Animalia
- Phylum: Mollusca
- Class: Gastropoda
- Order: Stylommatophora
- Family: Helicidae
- Genus: Cattania; Brusina, 1904

= Cattania =

Genus of land snails

Cattania is a genus of gastropods belonging to the family Helicidae.

The species of this genus are found in Southeastern Europe.

Species:

- Cattania apfelbecki (Sturany, 1901)
- Cattania ardica Dedov & Subai, 2006
- Cattania balcanica (L.Pfeiffer, 1853)
- Cattania faueri (Subai, 1990)
- Cattania haberhaueri (Sturany, 1897)
- Cattania ista A.Reischütz, N.Steiner-Reischütz & P.L.Reischütz, 2016
- Cattania kattingeri (Knipper, 1939)
- Cattania maranajensis (A.J.Wagner, 1914)
- Cattania olympica (J.R.Roth, 1855)
- Cattania pelia (P.Hesse, 1912)
- Cattania petrovici (A.J.Wagner, 1914)
- Cattania polinskii (A.J.Wagner, 1928)
- Cattania pseudocingulata (A.J.Wagner, 1914)
- Cattania rumelica (Rossmässler, 1838)
- Cattania subaii (Fauer, 1991)
- Cattania sztolcmani (A.J.Wagner, 1928)
- Cattania thateensis (Subai, 2012)
- Cattania trizona (Rossmässler, 1835)
- Cattania zebiana (Sturany, 1907)
