= Idiomela =

Scientific classification
- Kingdom: Animalia
- Phylum: Mollusca
- Class: Gastropoda
- Order: Stylommatophora
- Family: Helicidae
- Genus: Idiomela; T. Cockerell, 1921

Genus of gastropods

Idiomela is a genus of medium-sized air-breathing land snails, terrestrial pulmonate gastropods in the family Helicidae, the typical snails.

== Species ==
Species within the genus Idiomela include:

- Idiomela subplicata
