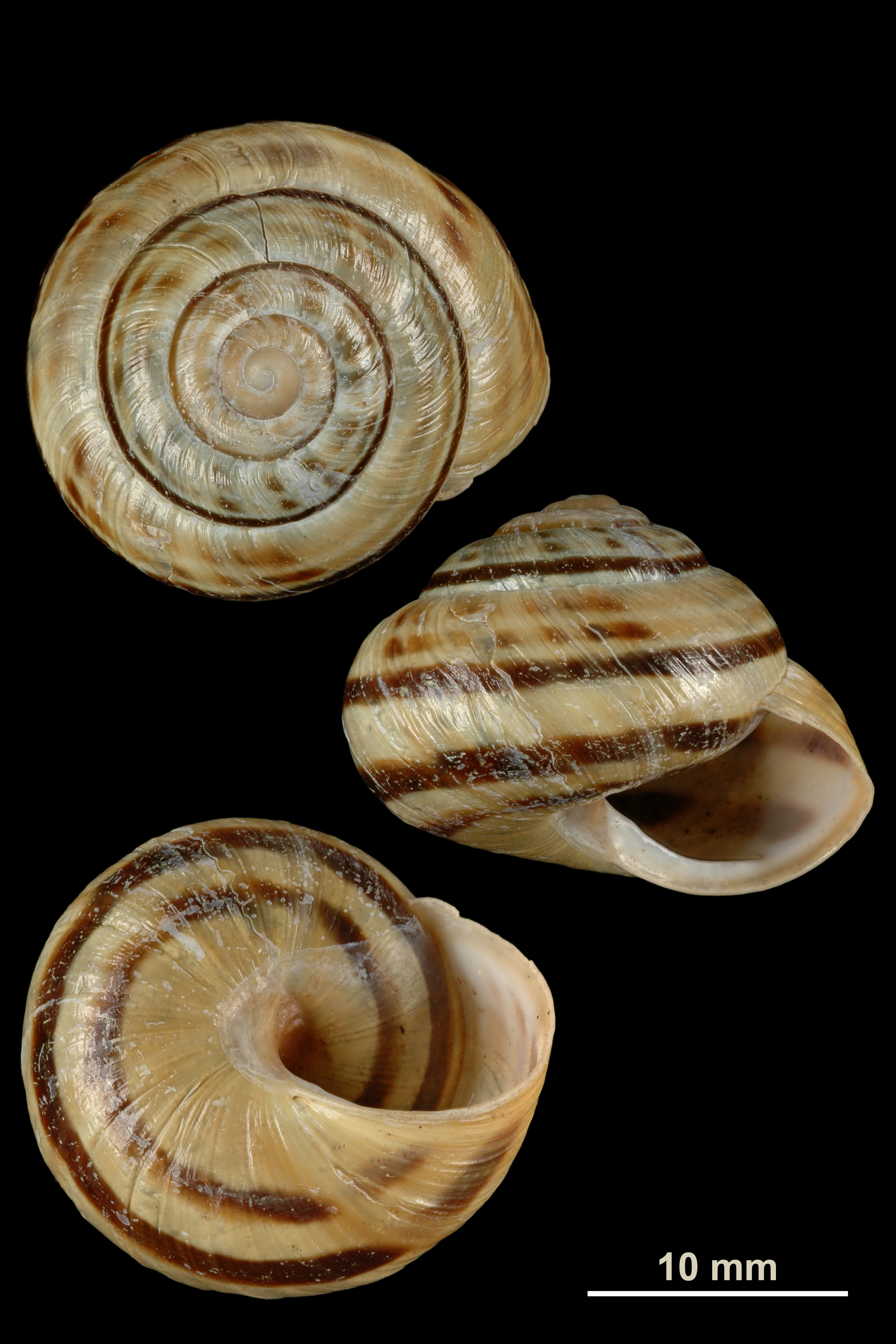
- Shells of Macularia sylvatica (specimen at MNHN, Paris)

Scientific classification
- Domain: Eukaryota
- Kingdom: Animalia
- Phylum: Mollusca
- Class: Gastropoda
- Order: Stylommatophora
- Family: Helicidae
- Genus: Macularia
- Species: M. sylvatica

Binomial name
- Macularia sylvatica (Drapanaud, 1801)

Synonyms
- Cepaea (Cepaea) silvatica (Draparnaud, 1801); Cepaea sylvatica (Draparnaud, 1801); Helix sylvatica Draparnaud, 1801 (original combination)

= Macularia sylvatica =

Species of gastropod

Macularia sylvatica is a medium-sized species of air-breathing dextral land snail, a terrestrial pulmonate gastropod mollusc in the family Helicidae. It was once seen as a close relative of the grove snail (Cepaea nemoralis), but does in fact not belong to the genus Cepaea at all.

== Geographic distribution and habitat ==
This west-Alpine species occurs in Germany, Italy, France, Liechtenstein and Switzerland. The vertical distribution extends from 265 m to 2560 m a.s.l. It lives in similar habitats as C. nemoralis, such as woods, dunes and grassland; however M. sylvatica tolerates wetter and colder mountain areas.

== Description ==
Macularia sylvatica is generally similar in appearance to C. nemoralis, although the shell is smaller, not as colourful, and not as variable. The spire of the shell is blunt. The most obvious character is the formation of the colour bands on the shell, where at least the upper two appear to be "interrupted".
