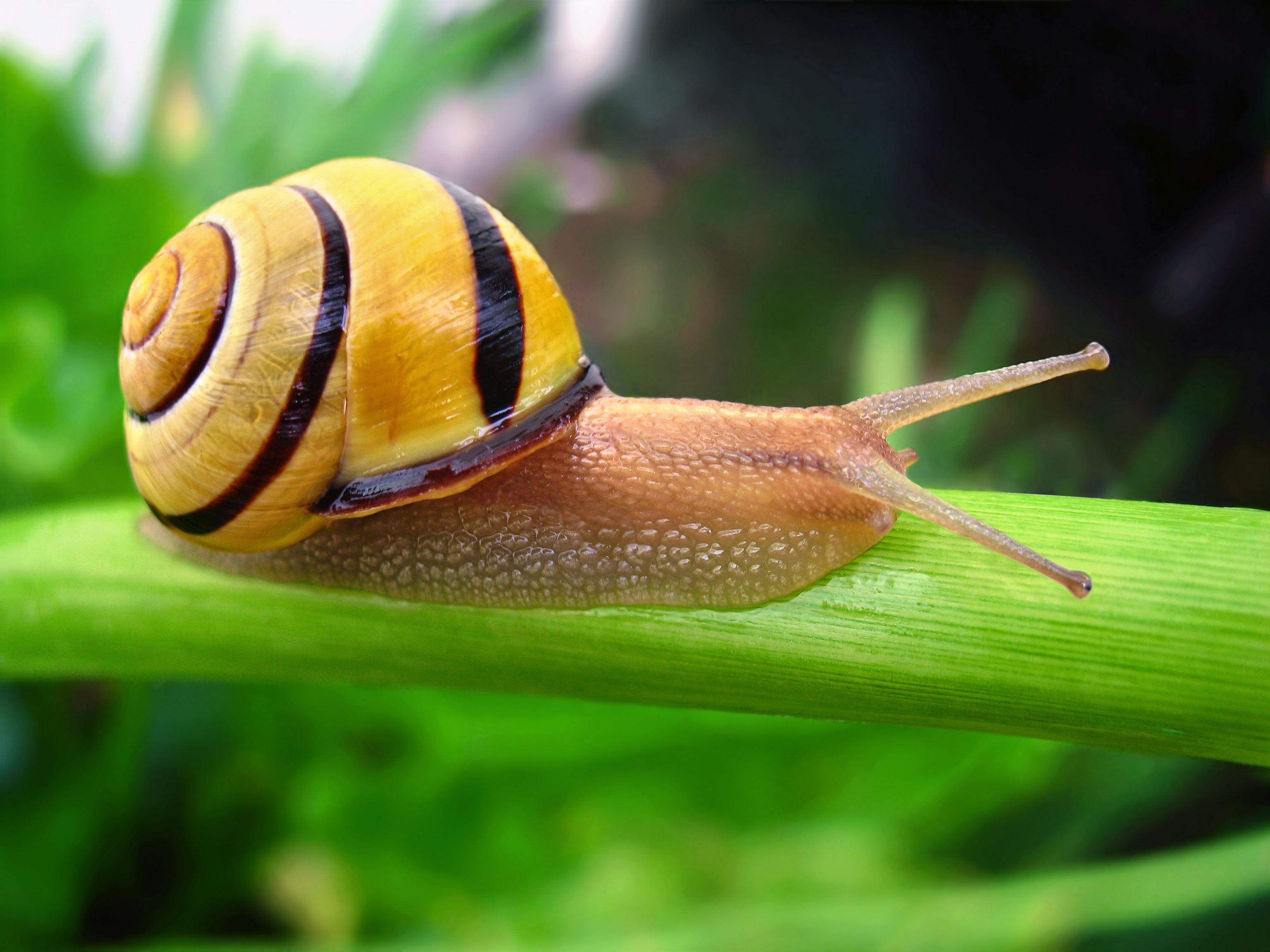

Conservation status
- Least Concern (IUCN 3.1)

- Secure (NatureServe)

Scientific classification
- Kingdom: Animalia
- Phylum: Mollusca
- Class: Gastropoda
- Order: Stylommatophora
- Family: Helicidae
- Genus: Cepaea
- Species: C. nemoralis

Binomial name
- Cepaea nemoralis (Linnaeus, 1758)

Synonyms
- Cepaea (Cepaea) nemoralis (Linnaeus, 1758); Helix nemoralis Linnaeus, 1758

= Cepaea nemoralis =

Species of gastropod

Cepaea nemoralis, the grove snail, brown-lipped snail or lemon snail, is a species of air-breathing land snail, a terrestrial pulmonate gastropod mollusc. Cepaea nemoralis is the type species of the genus Cepaea.

The species is one of the most common large land snails in Europe and has been introduced to North America. It is used as a model organism in ecological genetics, including in citizen science projects.

== Taxonomy ==
Cepaea nemoralis is the type species of the genus Cepaea.

Subspecies

- Cepaea nemoralis etrusca (Rossmässler, 1835)
- Cepaea nemoralis nemoralis (Linnaeus, 1758)

== Description ==
Cepaea nemoralis is among the largest and, because of its bright colouration, one of the best-known snails in Western Europe. The colour of the shell is highly variable; it ranges from brown, through pink, to yellow or even whitish, with or without one to five dark-brown bands. Names for many colour variants were coined in the nineteenth century but this system has been replaced by an independent scoring of shell colour and the presence/absence and fusion of individual bands numbered 1 to 5.

The thickened and slightly out-turned apertural lip of adults is usually dark brown, but can be white in some regions. The umbilicus is closed in adults but narrowly open in juveniles. The shell surface is semi-glossy. An adult shell consists of 4½–5½ whorls, with a width of 18–25 millimetres (3/4–1 in) and a height of 12–22 mm (1/2–7/8 in).

=== Similar species ===
Cepaea nemoralis is closely related to Cepaea hortensis. They share much the same habitat and exhibit a similar range of shell colours and banding patterns. Cepaea nemoralis tends to grow larger, but usually the species can most easily be recognised by the colour of the lip of adult shells. In a high proportion of regions, C. nemoralis consistently has a dark-brown lip to its shell, whilst C. hortensis has a white lip.

Love darts of Cepaea, cross sections on left

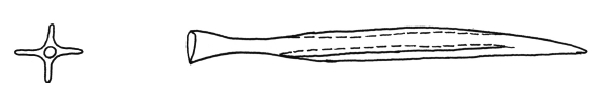
C. nemoralis

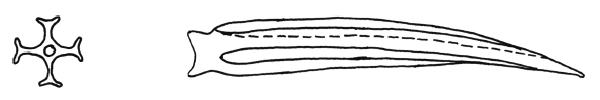
C. hortensis

In areas where lip colour is variable, dissection is necessary. A cross-section of the love dart of C. nemoralis shows a cross with simple blades, whereas that of C. hortensis has bifurcated blades. The mucous gland has 3 or fewer branches in C. nemoralis, but 4 or more in C. hortensis.

Two superficially similar species Caucasotachea vindobonensis and Macularia sylvatica both have a lip that is brown near the columella becoming pale towards the suture, and they have fine growth ridges on the shell whereas in both Cepaea species it is smooth. Also, M. sylvatica is distinct in having a small blunt tooth in its aperture, whilst the lowest brown band on the shell of C. vindobonensis lies noticeably closer to the columella than in Cepaea.

== Colour polymorphism ==
Cepaea nemoralis has been used as a model organism in ecological genetics, including in citizen science projects, because it is highly polymorphic in shell colour and banding. The background colour of the shell varies along a continuum from brown through pink to yellow and sometimes almost white. Additionally the shells can be with or without dark bands. The bands vary in intensity of colour, in width and in number, from zero to five. The genetics underlying this variation is extensively understood and is shared with C. hortensis. The polymorphism has also been intensely studied for its evolution and ecology. For instance, in stable habitats shells tend to be darker in woodland than in open habitats. The explanation might be camouflage or climatic selection: paler, more reflective colours in sunny environments reduce water loss and overheating. Climatic selection can also explain why yellow shells are more common in the south.

Another question is why the variation persists, usually even within a locality. Researchers have variously argued that the cause is random genetic drift and founder effects, different selection pressures in different areas with mixing by migration, and balanced polymorphism. Balanced polymorphism could arise when a predator like the song thrush develops a 'search image' for the commonest morph, so that the rarer morphs are less likely to be predated. Natural selection would then favour a diversity of colours and patterns as an antipredator adaptation. Most probably, the polymorphism has multiple causes.

Different coloration and banding of the shells of Cepaea nemoralis
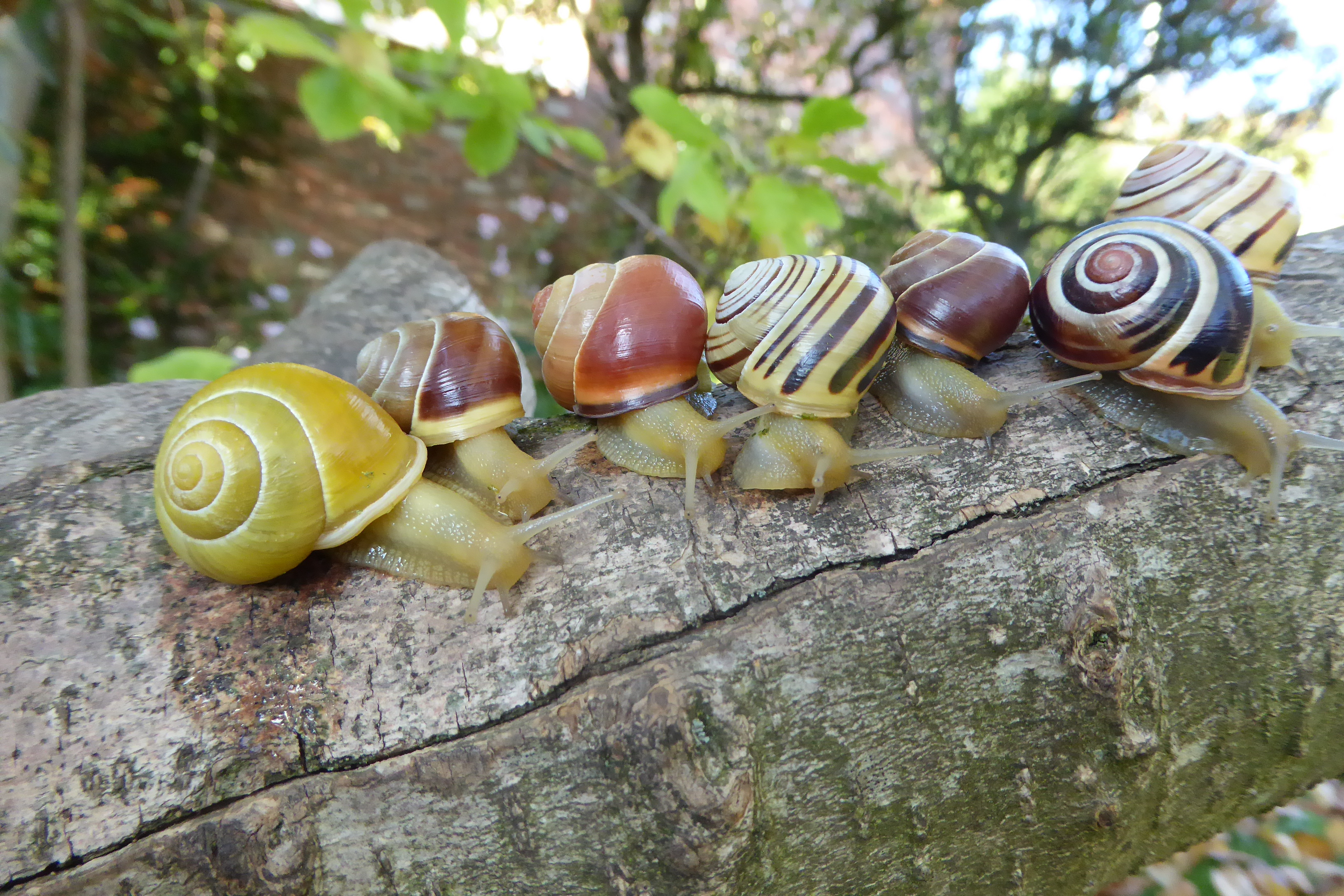
A diversity of forms

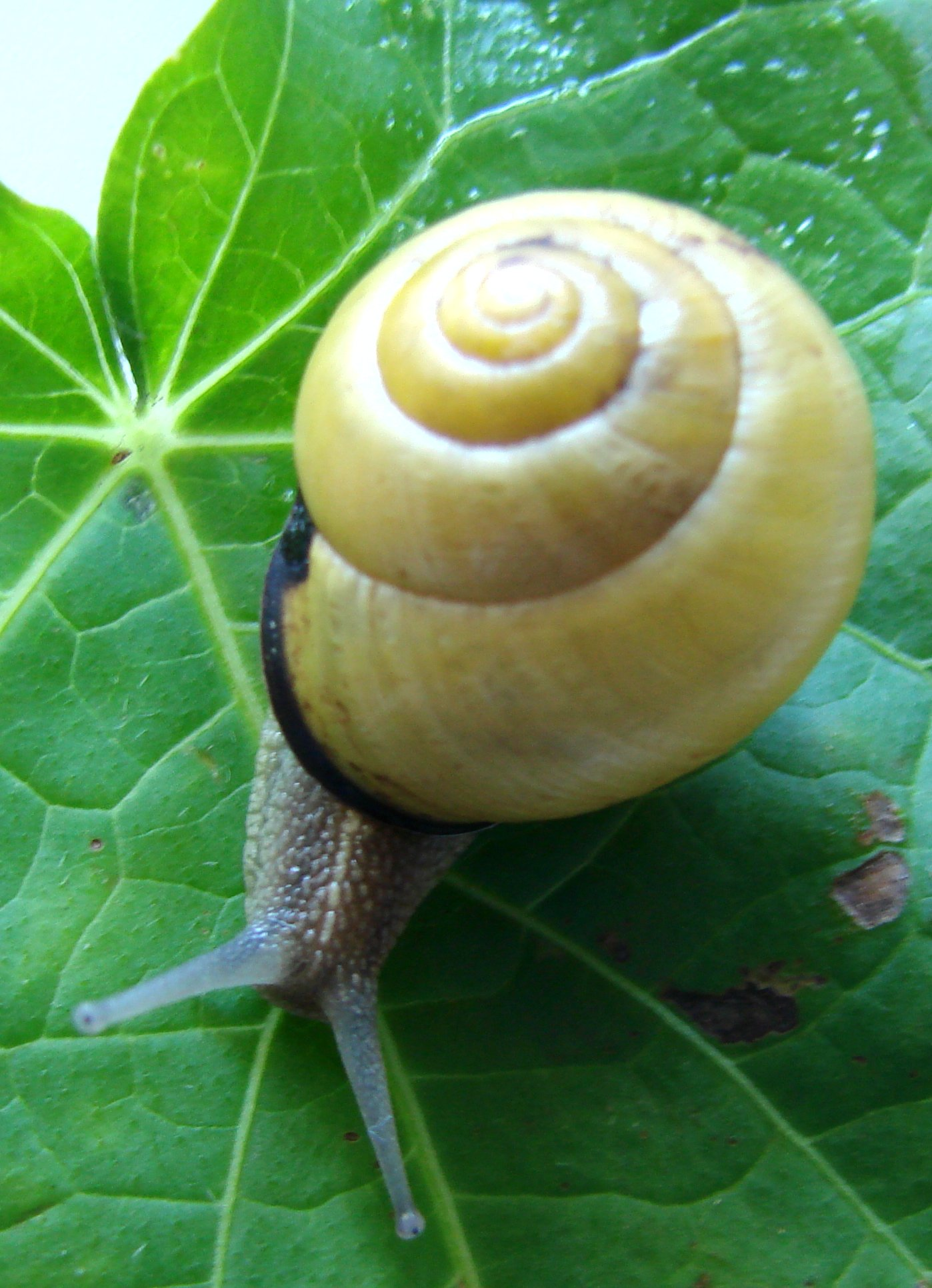
Yellow unbanded

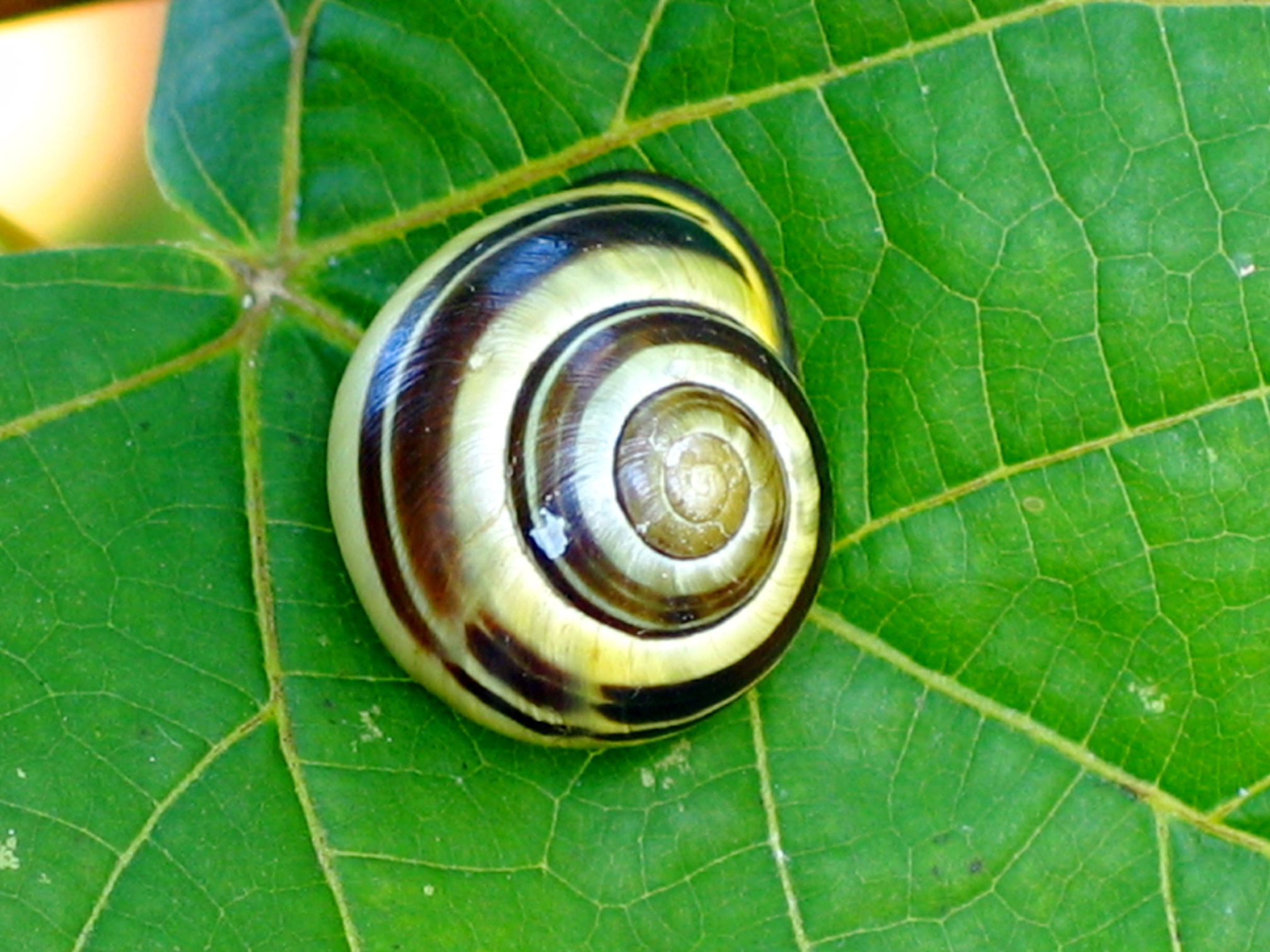
Yellow with several bands

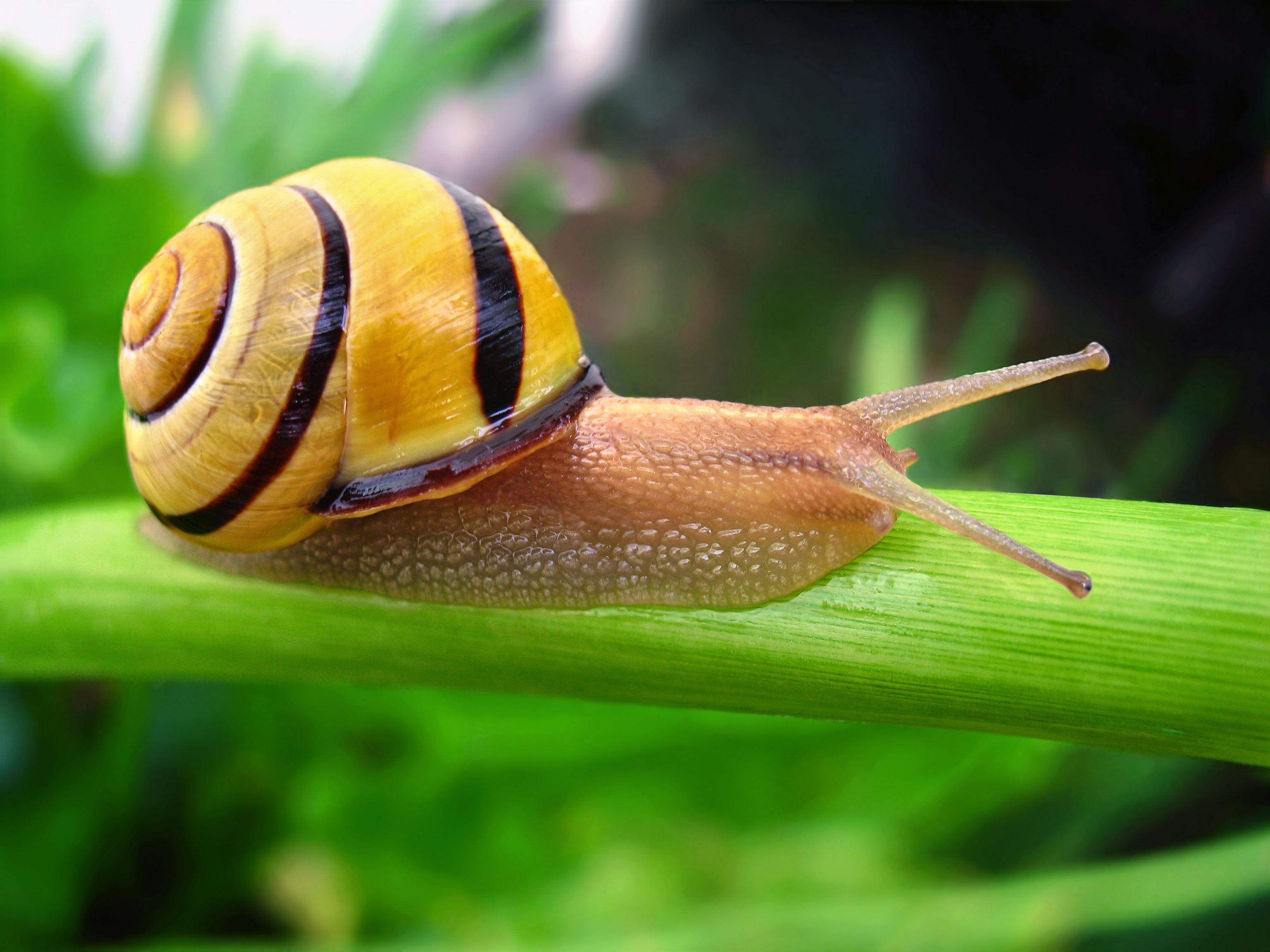
Yellow mid-banded

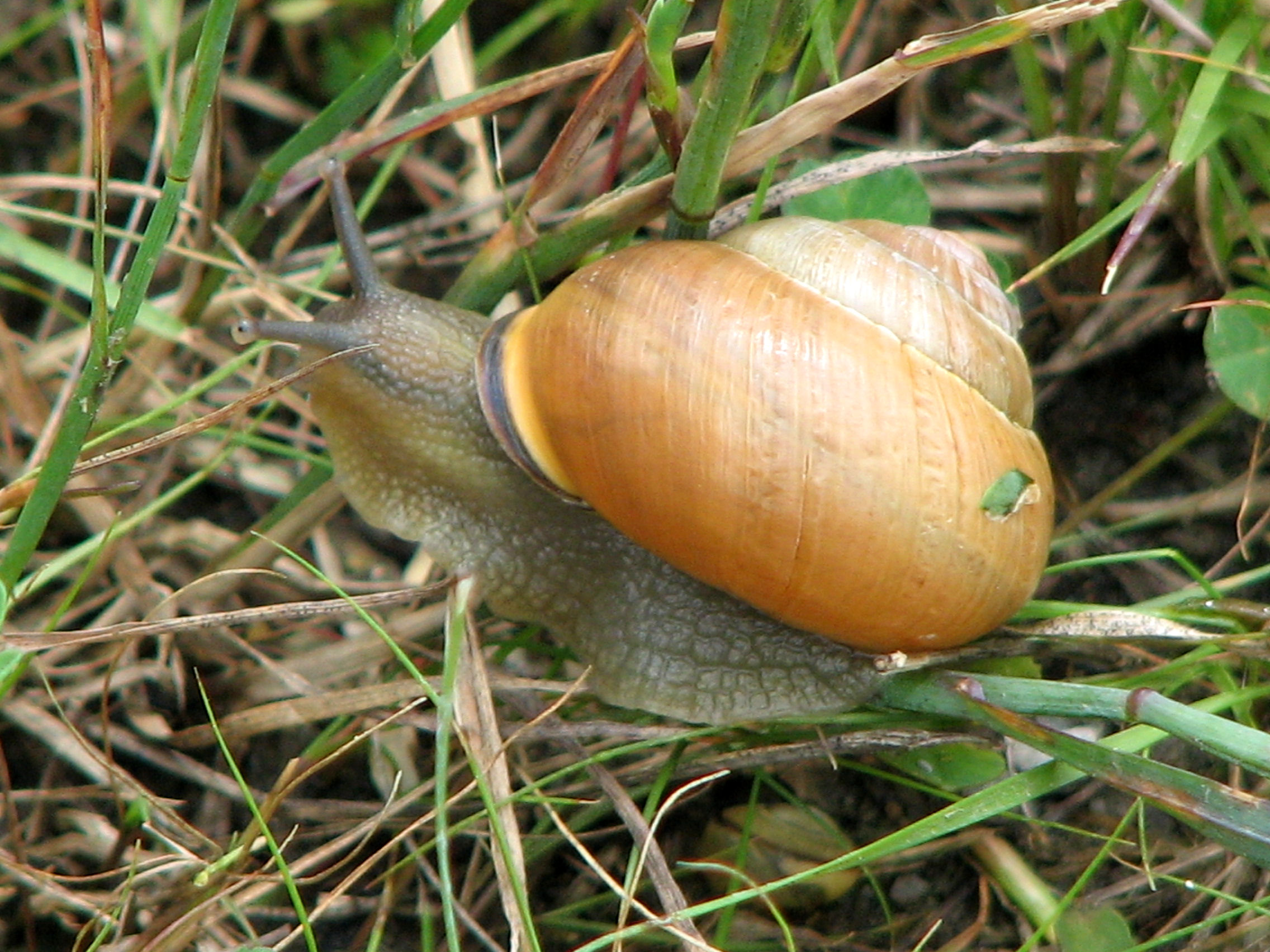
Reddish-brown unbanded

== Distribution ==
Snail traversing a leaf.

The native distribution of C. nemoralis is from Western and Northern Europe to Central Europe, but it has been spreading eastwards especially over the last few decades. Thus it is known from most of the Iberian Peninsula, France, Great Britain, Ireland, Belgium, the Netherlands, Germany, Denmark, southern Sweden and Norway, Switzerland, Austria, the Czech Republic, Hungary, Bosnia, Croatia, and the northern half of Italy. In Central and Eastern Europe it has spread particularly along the Baltic coast (e.g. in Poland, Latvia, Estonia, southern Finland, the east coast of Sweden) but also now elsewhere in Poland, and in Ukraine, Belarus and Russia. In Slovakia it was still known only from a single garden centre by 2020. The first reports from Romania and Bulgaria are each of a single very local occurrence within a city.

At the northern edge of its range,C. nemoralis is rare and scattered in northern Scotland, where it has been introduced. It is not found in the Hebrides, Orkney or Shetland. It seems to have been affected by air pollution and soil acidification in some parts of England.

Starting in 1857, there have been multiple introductions to North America, where it now occurs widely in Canada (from British Columbia to Newfoundland; in Ontario it is a pest of vineyards) and in the northeastern United States, with further occurrences further south (e.g. California, Colorado, Texas and South Carolina).

Both in America and Eastern Europe it is known that some introductions have been deliberate.

The range of C. hortensis mostly overlaps that of C. nemoralis but extends further north and less far south.

== Biology and ecology ==
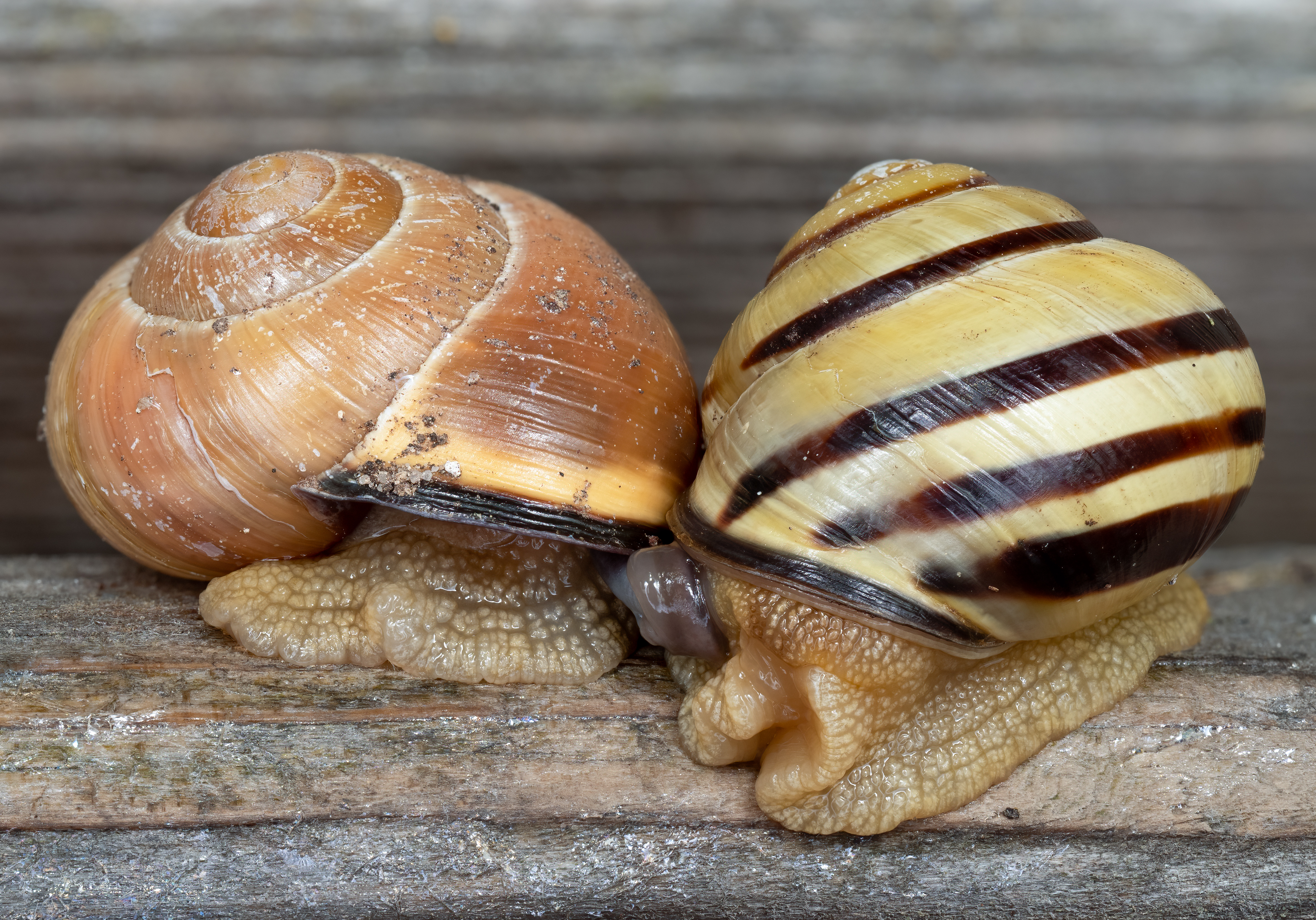
Mating

This is a very common and widespread species in Western Europe, occupying a wide range of habitats from coastal dunes to woodlands with full canopy cover, including gardens and abandoned land. In Eastern Europe, where it is a new arrival, it has turned up particularly in urban areas and other disturbed habitats. It can be found up to an altitude of 1,600 metres (5,200 ft) in the Alps, 1,800 m (5,900 ft) in the Pyrenees, 900 m (3,000 ft) in Wales, 600 m (2,000 ft) in Scotland. Density of adults is often of the order of 2 per square metre.

This species feeds mainly on dead or senescent plants. It prefers broad-leaved plants over grasses. Although mostly not a pest of crops, it can be a nuisance in vineyards because it is inadvertently picked with the grapes.

Like all pulmonate land snails, it is a hermaphrodite, and this species must mate to produce fertile eggs. Mating tends to be concentrated in late spring and early summer, though it can continue through the autumn. The snails may store the sperm they receive from their partner for some time, and individual broods can have mixed paternity. In Britain it lays clutches of 30–50 (in France 40–80) oval eggs between June and August (in France May–October, in West France until November). The size of the egg is 3.1 × 2.6 mm or egg diameter can be 2.3–3.0 mm. Juveniles hatch after 15–20 days.

This snail is comparatively slow-growing, taking 1 to 3 years to develop from an egg to a breeding adult. The life-span for this species is up to seven or eight years, with the annual survival rate of adults about 50% (= 3% over five years, older adults suffer higher mortalities). In winter, the snails may hibernate, but can become active again during warm spells.

Cepaea nemoralis is known experimentally to be a host for Angiostrongylus vasorum.

The most common predator of Cepaea nemoralis is the song thrush (Turdus philomelos), but other predators include rook (Corvus frugilegus), brown rat (Rattus norvegicus), European hedgehog (Erinaceus europaeus), wood/field mouse (Apodemus sylvaticus), moles (Talpidae), rabbits (Leporidae), phorid flies (Phoridae), maggots.
