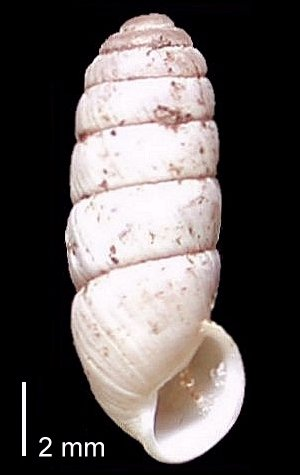
- Apertural view of a shell of Cylindrus obtusus

Scientific classification
- Domain: Eukaryota
- Kingdom: Animalia
- Phylum: Mollusca
- Class: Gastropoda
- Order: Stylommatophora
- Family: Helicidae
- Subfamily: Ariantinae
- Genus: Cylindrus; Fitzinger, 1833

= Cylindrus =

Genus of gastropods

Cylindrus is a genus of air-breathing land snails, terrestrial pulmonate gastropod mollusks in the family Helicidae, the typical snails.

According to some authors, the name Cylindrus Fitzinger, 1833 was homonymous with the cone snail genus Cylindrus Batsch, 1789, an alternate representation of Conus Linnaeus, 1758 and Cylindrus Deshayes, 1824 . The counter argument of others was, that these names have never been in use. As a result, an application to the International Commission on Zoological Nomenclature (ICZN) for the conservation of the name Cylindrus Fitzinger, 1833. was made. In January 2019 the ICZN decided to conserve the name Cylindrus Fitzinger, 1833.

== Species ==
The genus Cylindrus contains the following species:

- Cylindrus obtusus
