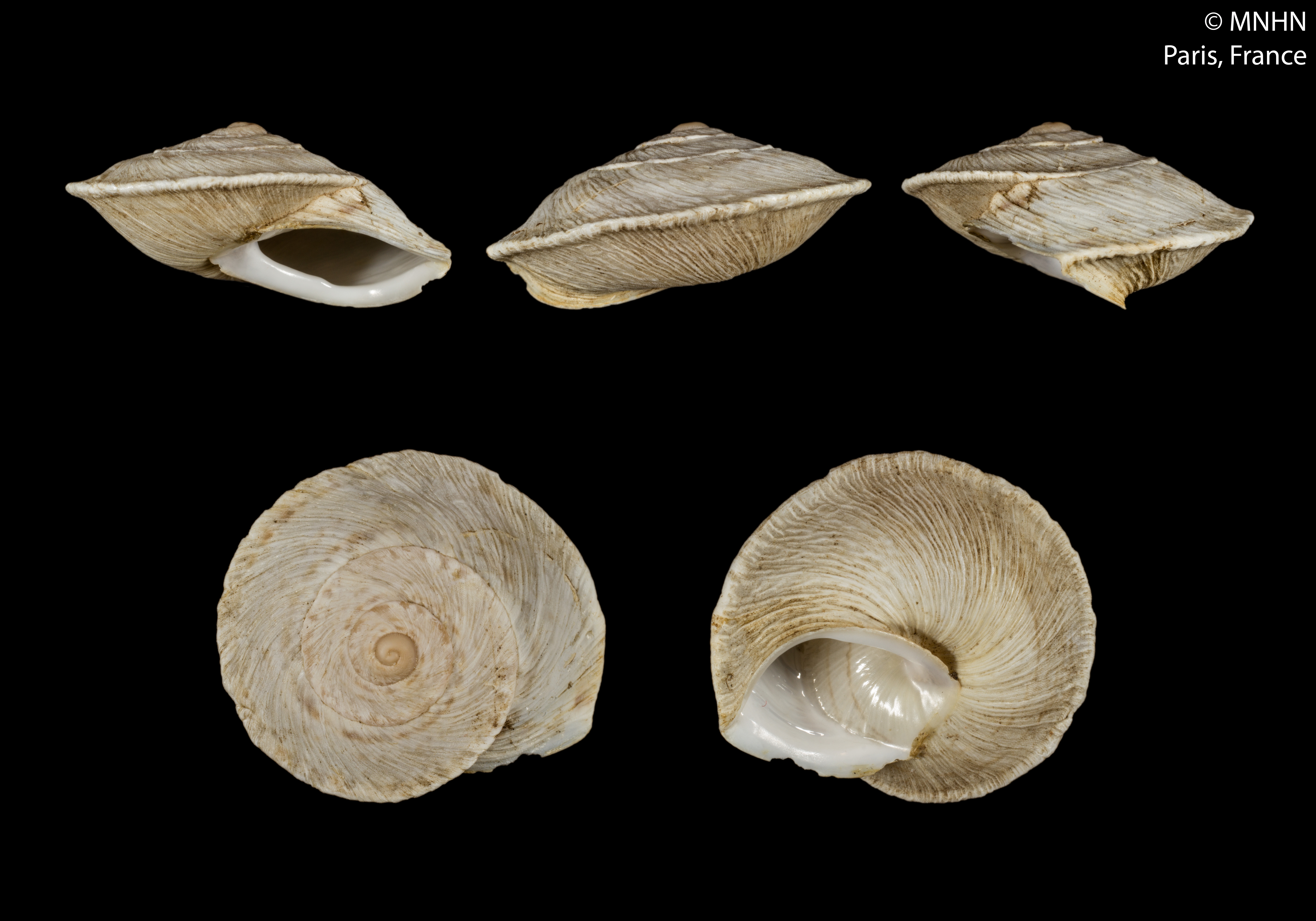
- Shell of Rossmaessleria sultana (syntype at MNHN, Paris)

Scientific classification
- Kingdom: Animalia
- Phylum: Mollusca
- Class: Gastropoda
- Order: Stylommatophora
- Family: Helicidae
- Subfamily: Helicinae
- Tribe: Thebini
- Genus: Rossmaessleria; P. Hesse, 1907

= Rossmaessleria =

Genus of gastropods

Rossmaessleria is a genus of land snails in the subfamily Helicinae of the family Helicidae.

== Distribution ==
This genus of snail is native to northwestern Africa and southwestern Europe.

== Anatomy ==
These snails create and shoot love darts as part of their courtship and mating behavior.

== Species ==
Species within the genus Rossmaessleria include:

- Rossmaessleria boettgeri (Kobelt, 1881)
- Rossmaessleria galindoae Torres & Ahuir Galindo, 2011
- Rossmaessleria homadensis (Rutllant, 1974)
- Rossmaessleria keltiensis Galindo, 2017
- Rossmaessleria kucerai Galindo, 2017
- Rossmaessleria marocana Galindo, 2017
- Rossmaessleria scherzeri (L. Pfeiffer & Zelebor, 1867)
- Rossmaessleria sicanoides (Kobelt, 1881)
- Rossmaessleria subcabriuscula (Böttger)
- Rossmaessleria sultana (P.M.A. Morelet, 1880)
- Rossmaessleria tetuanensis (Kobelt)
- Rossmaessleria tistutensis (Rutllant)
- Rossmaessleria weberi (Kobelt, 1881)

Species brought into synonymy

- Rossmaessleria anticana Pallary, 1928: synonym of Rossmaessleria scherzeri fichtalana (Pallary, 1919) (original combination)
- Rossmaessleria vondeli Pallary, 1928: synonym of Loxana beaumieri (Mousson, 1873) (original combination)
