= Caucasotachea =

- Caucasotachea atrolabiata

Scientific classification
- Domain: Eukaryota
- Kingdom: Animalia
- Phylum: Mollusca
- Class: Gastropoda
- Order: Stylommatophora
- Family: Helicidae
- Tribe: Helicini
- Genus: Caucasotachea; C. R. Boettger, 1909

Type species
- Helix atrolabiata Krynicki, 1833

Synonyms
- Austrotachea Pfeffer, 1930; Cepaea (Octadenia) Schileyko, 1978

Genus of gastropods

Caucasotachea is a genus of medium-sized air-breathing land snails, terrestrial pulmonate gastropod molluscs in the family Helicidae.

== Species ==
The following extant species are currently classified in the genus:

- Caucasotachea atrolabiata (Krynicki, 1833)
- Caucasotachea leucoranea (Mousson, 1863)
- Caucasotachea vindobonensis (C. Pfeiffer, 1828)

Several fossil taxa are placed to Caucasotachea:

- † Caucasotachea andrussovi Steklov, 1966
- † Caucasotachea beringi Schütt, 1985
- † Caucasotachea candirensis Schütt, 1985
- † Caucasotachea kubanica Steklov, 1966
- † Caucasotachea phrygomysica (Oppenheim, 1919)

== Genetics ==
The haploid number of chromosomes is 25 (C. vindobonensis) or 26 (C. atrolabiata).
