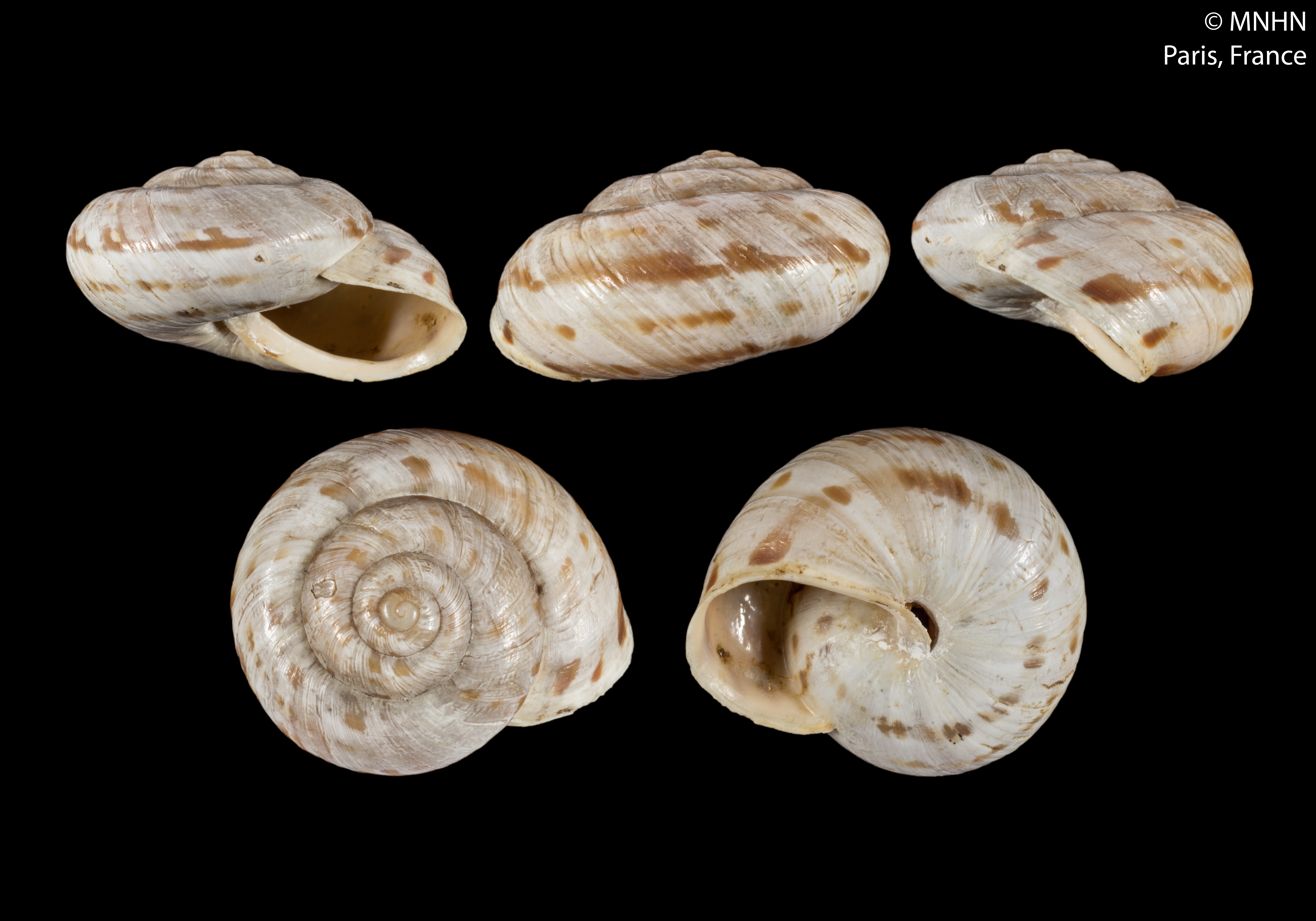
- Shell of Macularia niciensis (syntype at MNHN, Paris)

Scientific classification
- Kingdom: Animalia
- Phylum: Mollusca
- Class: Gastropoda
- Order: Stylommatophora
- Family: Helicidae
- Subfamily: Helicinae
- Tribe: Maculariini
- Genus: Macularia; Albers, 1850

Type species
- Helix niciensis Férussac, 1821

Synonyms
- Helix (Macularia) Albers, 1850; Hylotachea G. Pfeffer, 1930

= Macularia =

Genus of gastropods

Macularia is a genus of air-breathing land snails, a pulmonate gastropod in the subfamily Helicinae of the family Helicidae, the typical snails.

== Species ==
- Macularia niciensis (A. Férussac, 1821)
- Macularia saintivesi (Kobelt, 1906)
- Macularia sylvatica (Draparnaud, 1801)

Species brought into synonymy

- Macularia riffensis Kobelt, 1903: synonym of Hatumia riffensis (Kobelt, 1903) (original combination)
- Macularia saintyvesi (Kobelt, 1906): synonym of Macularia saintivesi (Kobelt, 1906)
- Macularia vittata (O. F. Müller, 1774): synonym of Pseudotrachia vittata (O. F. Müller, 1774) (superseded combination)
