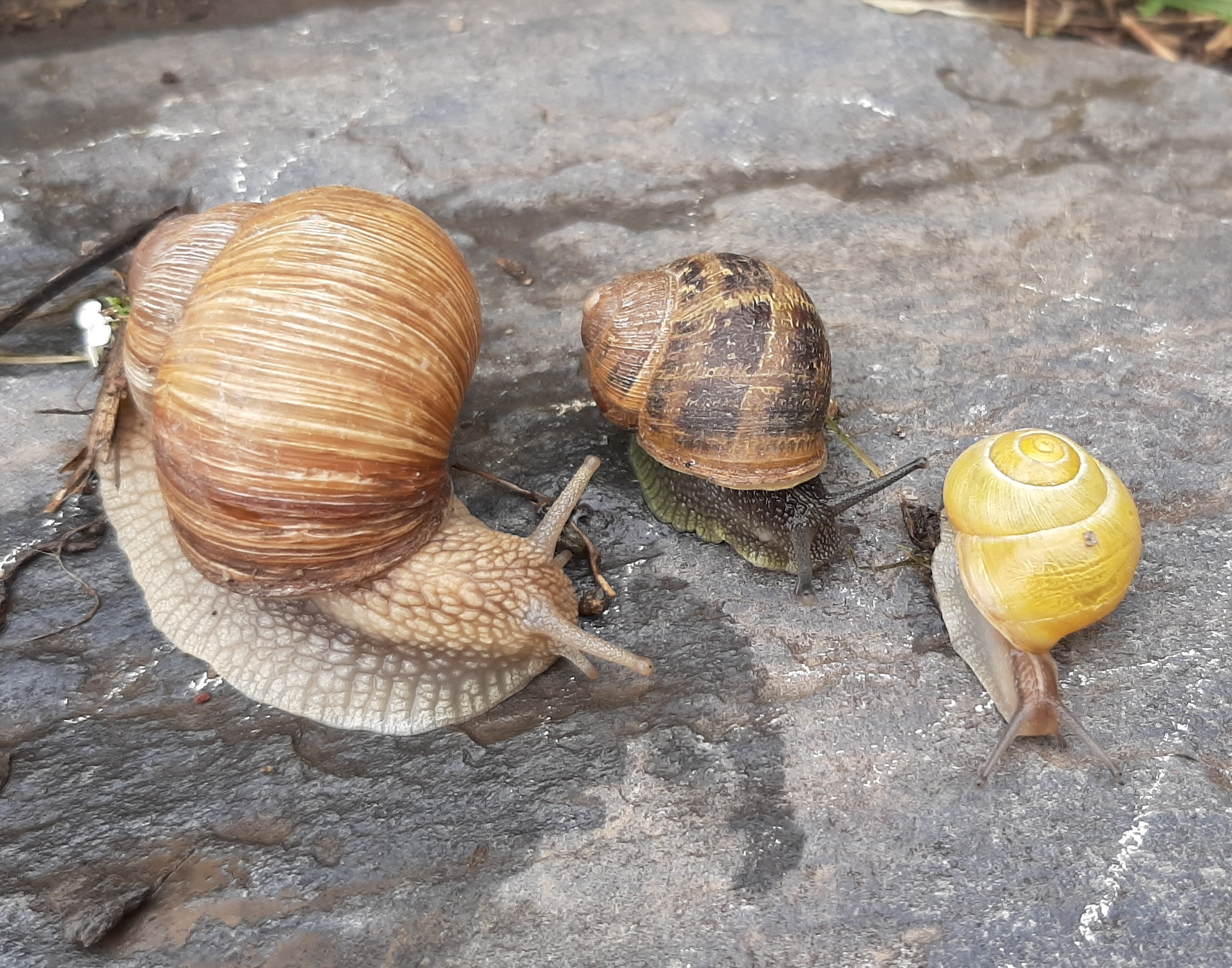
- From left to right: Roman snail (Helix pomatia), Garden snail (Cornu aspersum) and White-lipped snail (Cepaea hortensis), three species of Helicinae

Scientific classification
- Kingdom: Animalia
- Phylum: Mollusca
- Class: Gastropoda
- Order: Stylommatophora
- Superfamily: Helicoidea
- Family: Helicidae; Rafinesque, 1815

Type genus
- Helix Linnaeus, 1758

Subfamilies
- Ariantinae; Murellinae; Helicinae

= Helicidae =

Family of gastropods

Helicidae is a large, diverse family of western Palaearctic, medium to large-sized, air-breathing land snails, sometimes called the "typical snails." It includes some of the largest European land snails, several species are common in anthropogenic habitats, and some became invasive on other continents. A number of species in this family are valued as food items, including Cornu aspersum (formerly Helix aspersa; "petit gris") the brown or garden snail, and Helix pomatia (the "escargot"). The biologies of these two species in particular have been thoroughly studied and documented.

== Shell description ==
Caucasotachea atrolabiata

The shells are usually flattened or depressed conical. Globular shells are found in the genera Helix, Maltzanella, Lindholmia, Cornu, Cantareus, Eremina, and Idiomella. One species, Cylindrus obtusus, has a cylindrical shell. In some genera, especially in Cepaea, the shells are brightly colored and patterned.

== Anatomy ==
Helicidae typically have a ribbed jaw, bursa copulatrix with a diverticulum, and one dart sac accompanied by a pair of (usually) branched, tubular mucous glands inserting at the base of the dart sac.

== Genetics ==
In this family, the number of haploid chromosomes lies between 22 and 30.

In the "Darwin Tree of Life"." project, four species (Cepaea nemoralis, Cepaea hortensis, Cornu aspersum, and Arianta arbustorum) are scheduled for whole genome sequencing and assembly ("Data portal".).

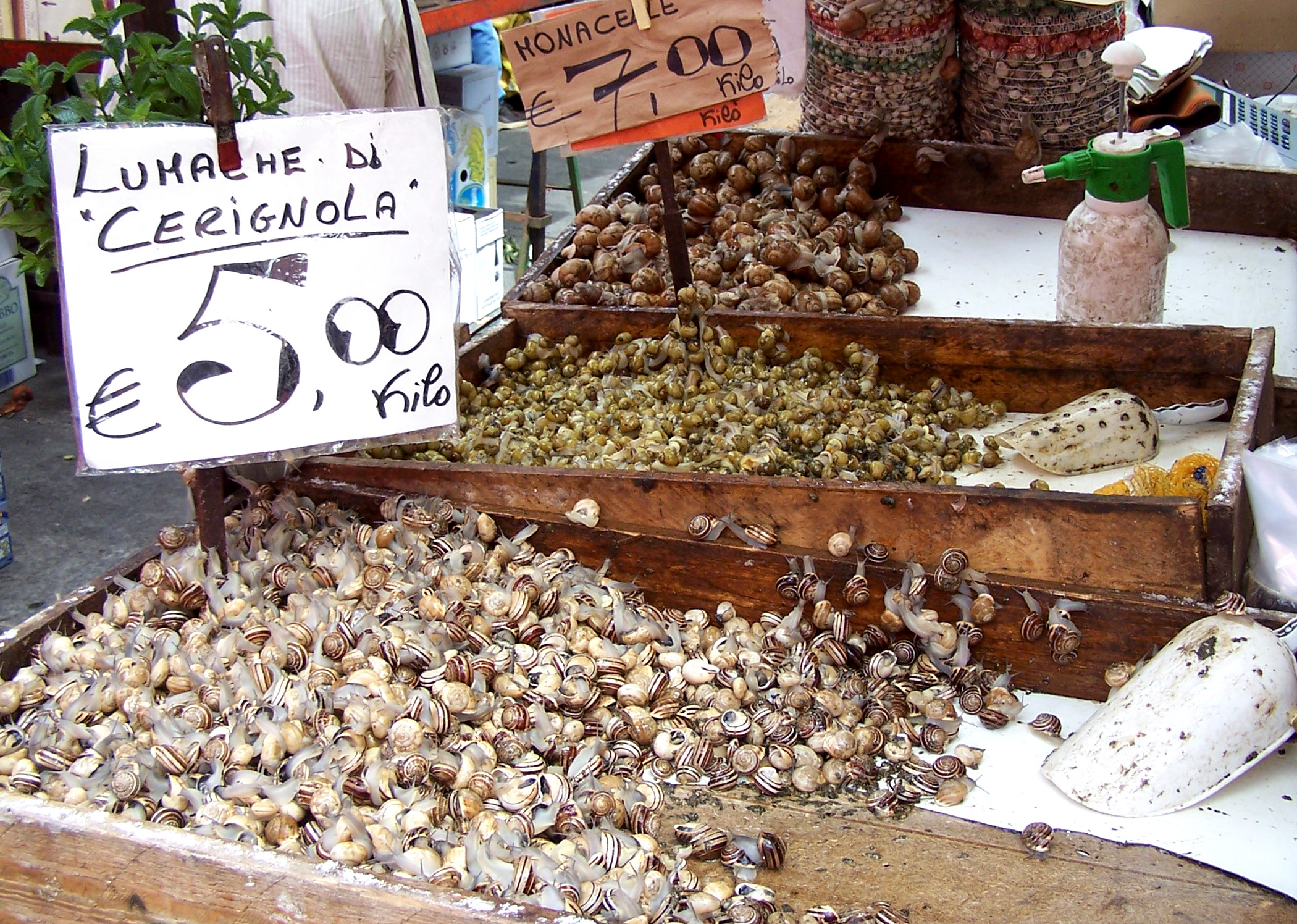
Helicid snails for sale as food in Italy; from the front Eobania vermiculata, Cantareus apertus, and Helix sp.

== Distribution ==
The core of helicids is distributed in from the Caucasus through Turkey and Europe to North Africa. However, some genera or species live beyond these limits. Helicids occur on Cape Verde (Eremina), Canary Islands (Theba, Hemicycla) and the Madeira Archipelago (Lampadia, Idiomela). Levantina extends far south in western Arabia, and Eremina desertella is distributed as south as Sudan, Eritrea and Puntland in Somalia. Cepaea hortensis lives on Iceland and in a small area in eastern Canada. Some species, notably Cornu aspersum and Theba pisana have been introduced and become established in numerous different areas worldwide.

== Taxonomy ==
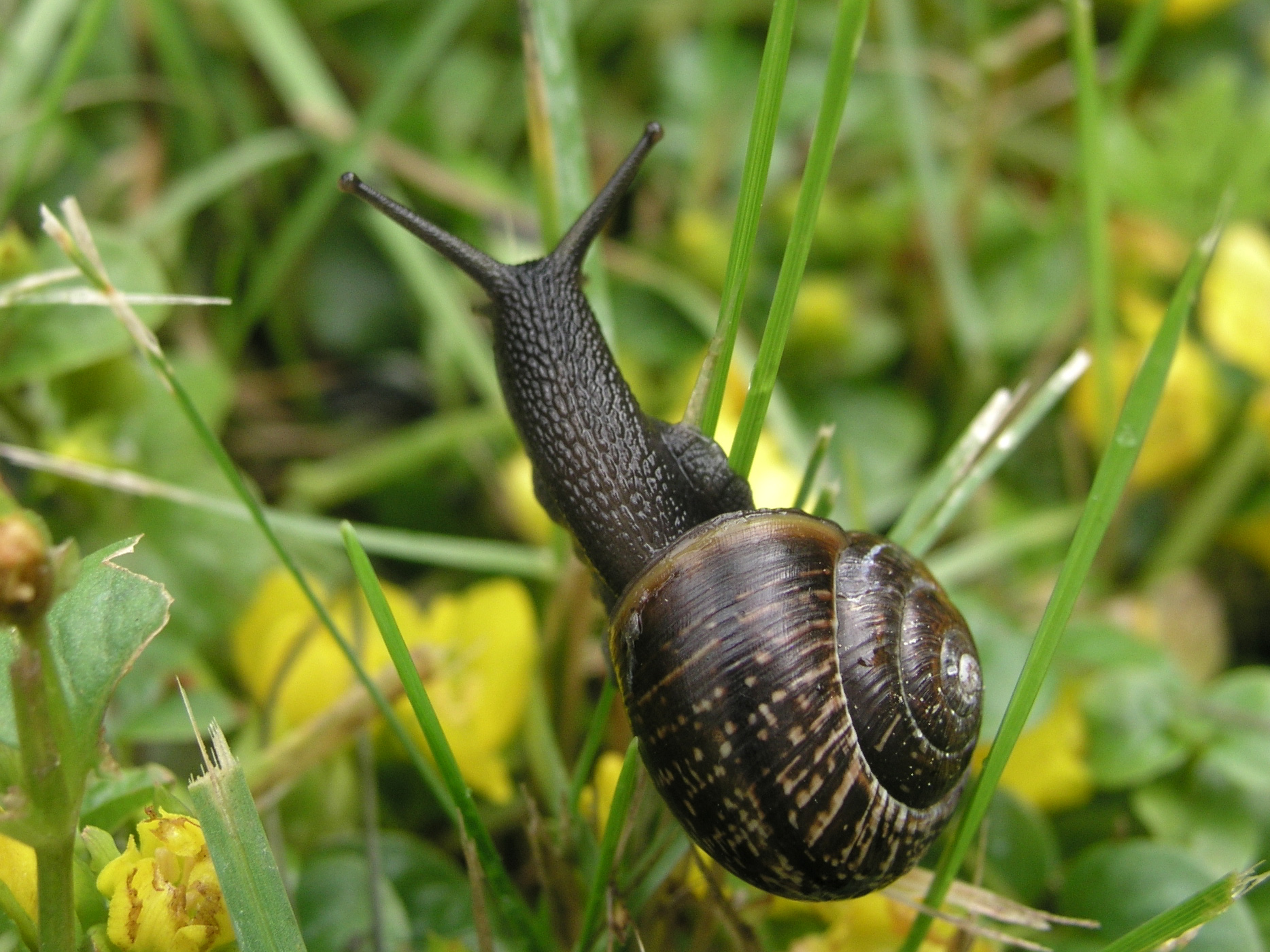
Arianta arbustorum

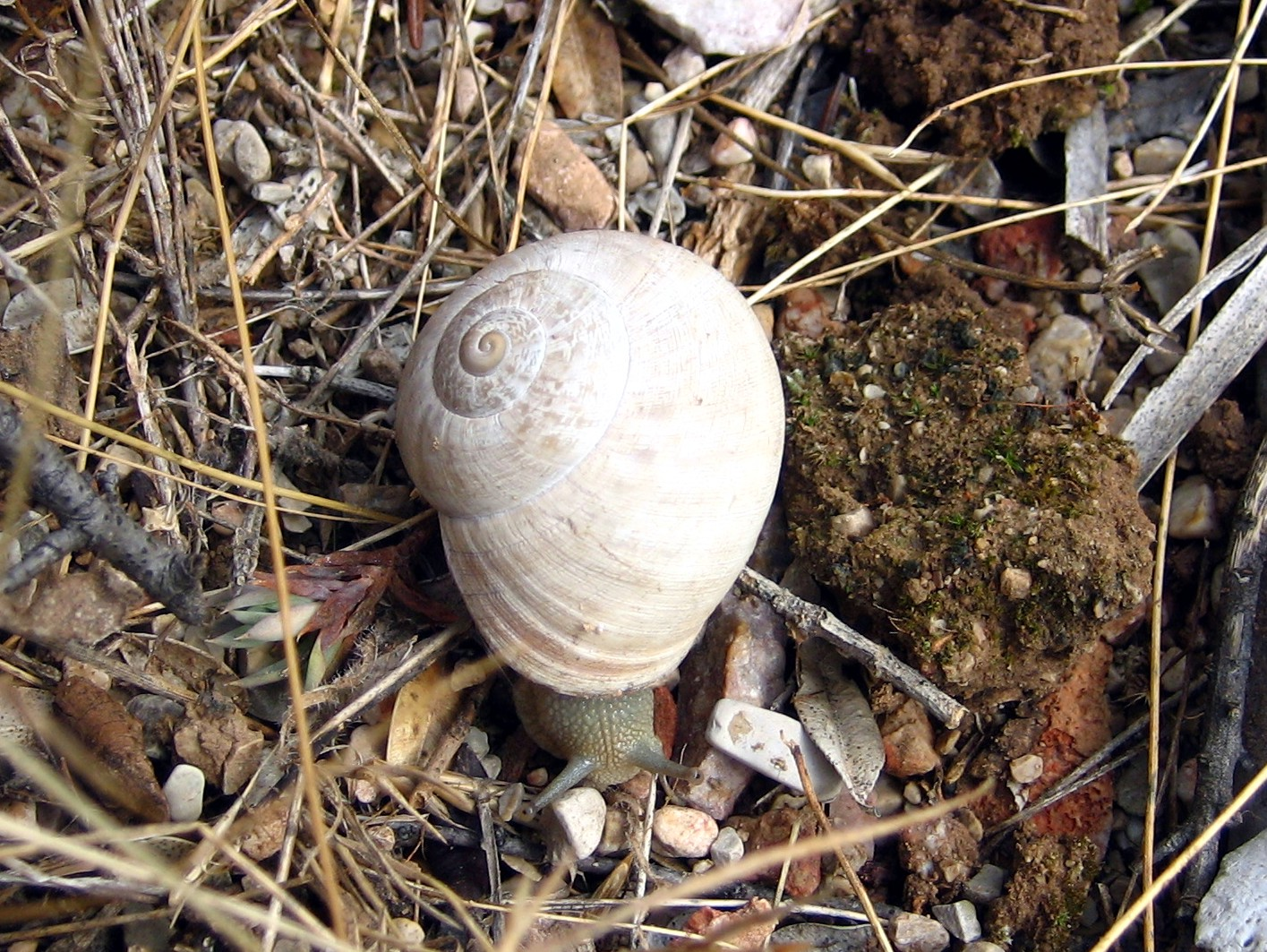
Iberus gualtieranus alonensis

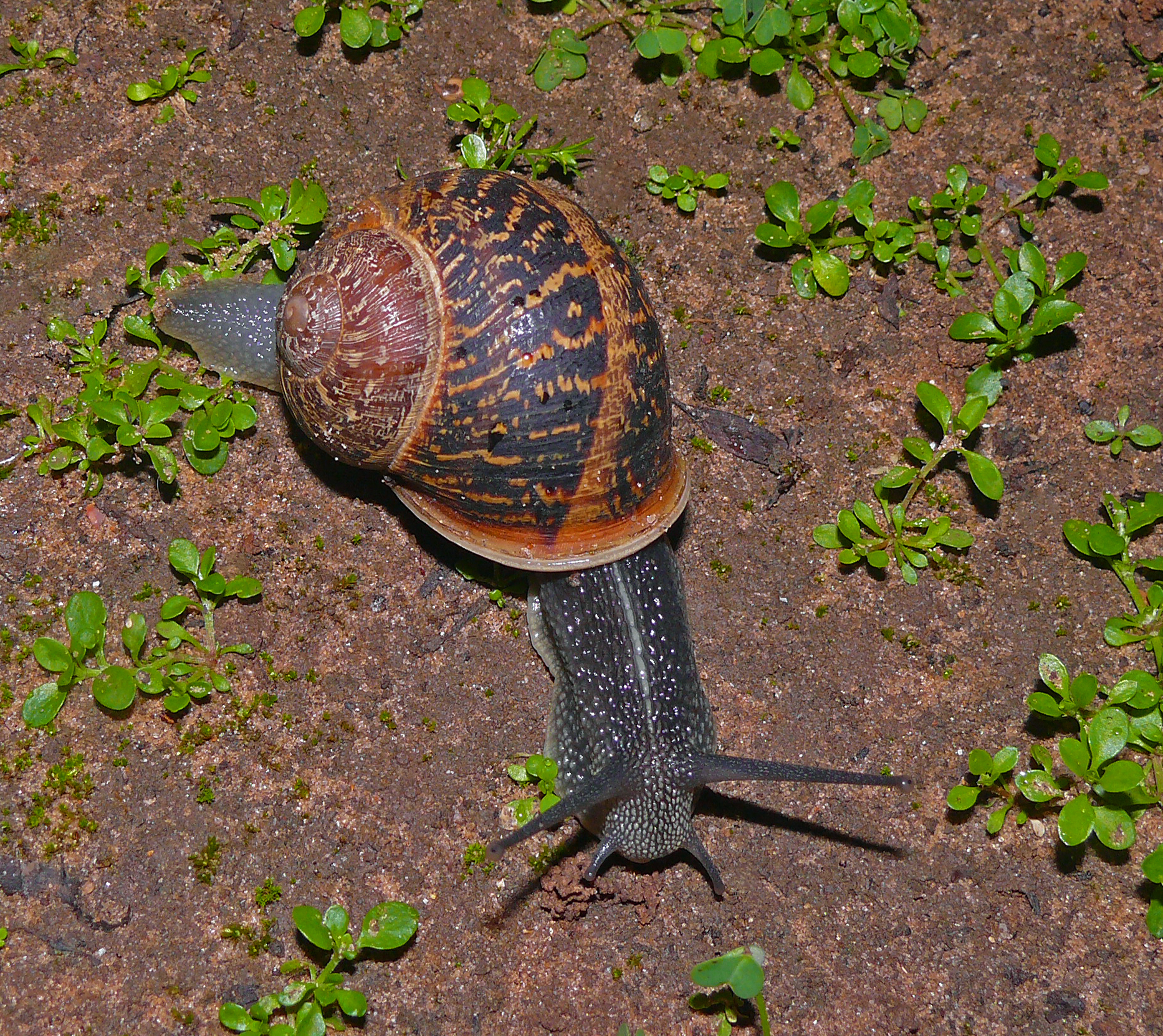
Cornu aspersum

The family Helicidae contains 3 subfamilies (according to molecular phylogenetic analyses):

=== Subfamily Helicinae Rafinesque, 1815 ===
Genital system anatomy (does not apply on all species, as derived states are found in some of them): mucous glands divided into 2 or more branches, love dart with four blades (vanes) along its length, two penial papillae/verges.

==== Tribe Allognathini Westerlund, 1903 ====
- Allognathus
- Cepaea Held, 1838
- Hemicycla
- Iberus
- Idiomela T. Cockerell, 1921
- Lampadia

==== Tribe Helicini Rafinesque, 1815 ====
- Aristena Psonis, Vardinoyannis & Poulakakis, 2022
- Amanica Nordsieck, 2017
- Caucasotachea Boettger, 1909
- Codringtonia Kobelt, 1898
- Helix Linnaeus, 1758 - type genus
- Isaurica Kobelt, 1901
- Levantina Kobelt, 1871
- Lindholmia Hesse, 1918
- Maltzanella Hesse, 1917
- Neocrassa Subai, 2005

==== Tribe Thebini Wenz, 1923 ====
A 2022 phylogenetic analysis proposed that all groups of the Maghreb radiation belonged to a single tribe, Thebini, without support for a separate Otalini tribe. The same study proposed a new tribe, Maculariini trib. nov. containing the genus Macularia due to the wide geographic disjunction between the western Alpine Macularia and the primarily Maghrebian Thebini tribe.

- Cantareus Risso, 1826
- Cornu Born, 1778
- Eobania P. Hesse, 1913
- Eremina Pfeiffer, 1855
- Gyrostomella P. Hesse, 1911
- Loxana Pallary, 1899
- Massylaea Möllendorff, 1898
- Otala Schumacher, 1817
- Rossmaessleria P. Hesse, 1907
- Theba Risso, 1826

==== Tribe Maculariini Neiber, Korábek, Glaubrecht & Hausdorf, 2021 ====
- Macularia Albers, 1850

=== Subfamily Murellinae Hesse, 1918 ===
Genital system anatomy (does not apply on all species, as derived states are found in some of them): mucous glands weakly branched or undivided, love dart with four blades along its length, one penial papilla.

Distributed in Sardinia, Corsica, the Apennine Peninsula and Sicily.

- Marmorana W. Hartmann, 1844
- Tacheocampylaea
- Tyrrheniberus

=== Subfamily Ariantinae Mörch, 1864 ===
Genital system anatomy: mucous glands divided into 2 branches or undivided, love dart with two blades on the tip, one penial papilla.

- Arianta Turton, 1831
- Campylaea H. Beck, 1837
- Campylaeopsis A.J. Wagner, 1914
- Cattania Brusina, 1904
- Causa Schileyko, 1971
- Chilostoma Fitzinger, 1833
- Corneola Held, 1838
- Cylindrus Fitzinger, 1833
- Delphinatia P. Hesse, 1931
- Dinarica Kobelt, 1902
- Drobacia Brusina, 1904
- Faustina Kobelt, 1904
- Helicigona A. Férussac, 1821
- Isognomostoma Fitzinger, 1833
- Josephinella F. Haas, 1936
- Kollarix Groenenberg, Subai & E. Gittenberger, 2016
- Kosicia Brusina, 1904
- Liburnica Kobelt, 1904
- Pseudotrizona Groenenberg, Subai & E. Gittenberger, 2016
- Thiessea Kobelt, 1904
- Vidovicia Brusina, 1904
- †Pseudochloritis C. R. Boettger, 1909
- †Mesodontopsis Pilsbry, 1895
- †Metacampylaea Pilsbry, 1895
- †Paradrobacia H. Nordsieck, 2014
- †Pseudoklikia H. Nordsieck, 2018

=== Incertae sedis ===
- †Megalotachea Pfeffer, 1930
