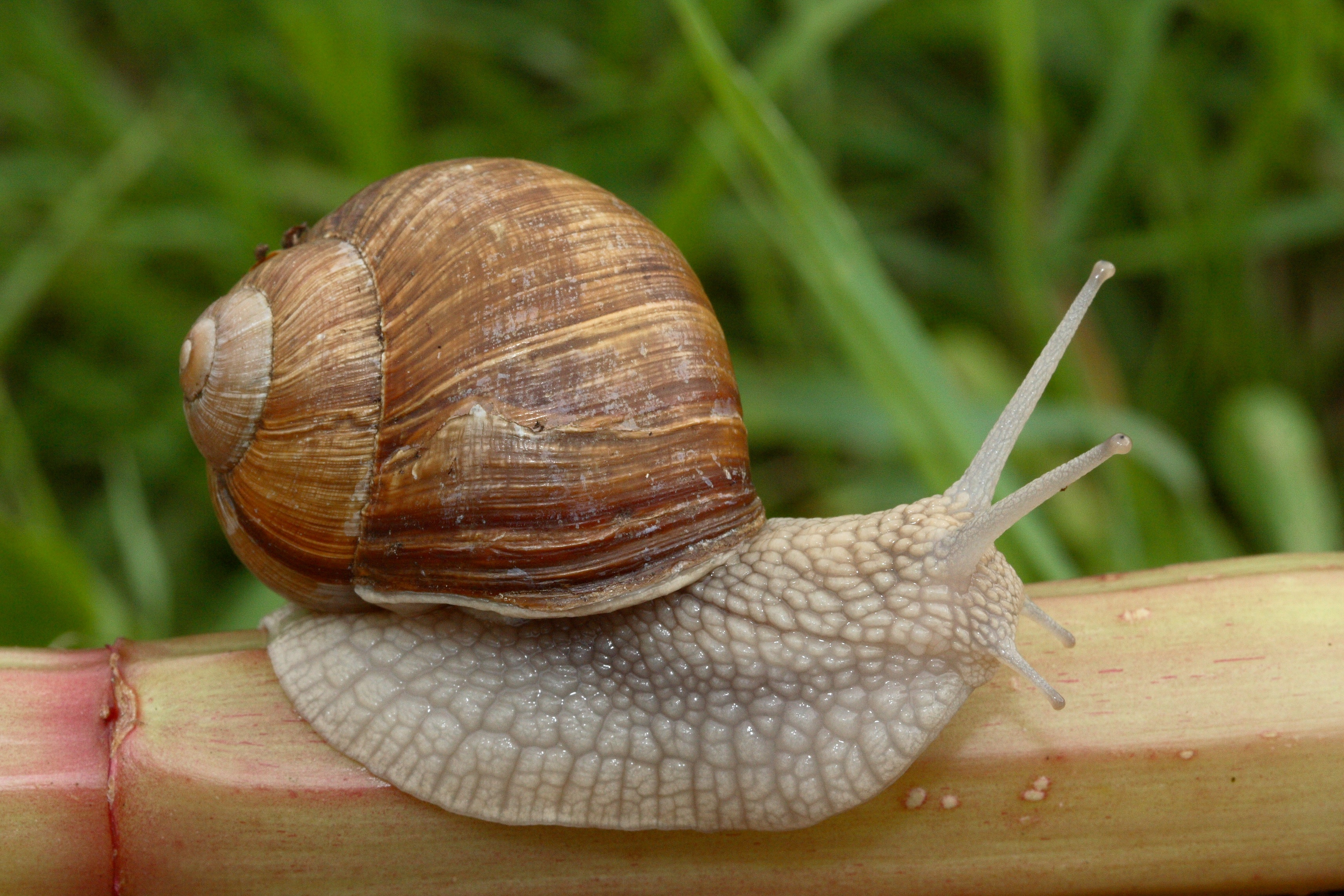
- Helix pomatia

Scientific classification
- Kingdom: Animalia
- Phylum: Mollusca
- Class: Gastropoda
- Order: Stylommatophora
- Family: Helicidae
- Subfamily: Helicinae
- Tribe: Helicini
- Genus: Helix; Linnaeus, 1758

Type species
- Helix pomatia Linnaeus, 1758

Synonyms
- See text

= Helix (gastropod) =

Helix Temporal range: Miocene–recent

Genus of gastropods

Helix is a genus of large, air-breathing land snails native to the western Palaearctic and characterized by a globular shell. It is the type genus of the family Helicidae and one of the animal genera described by Carl Linnaeus at the dawn of the zoological nomenclature. Members of the genus first appeared in the fossil record during the Miocene.

Well-known species include Helix pomatia (Roman snail, Burgundy snail, or edible snail) and Helix lucorum (Turkish snail). Cornu aspersum (garden snail), though externally similar and long classified as a member of Helix (as "Helix aspersa"), is not closely related to Helix and belongs to a different tribe of Helicinae.

== Taxonomy ==
In Linnaeus' 10th edition of Systema Naturae, which marks the beginning of the zoological nomenclature, the generic name Helix had been used for a variety of terrestrial (e.g. Zonites algirus), freshwater (e.g. Lymnaea stagnalis), and marine (e.g. Fossarus ambiguus) gastropods. Later authors restricted the name's use to stylommatophoran species with flattened to globular shells, including zonitids and other groups. In the course of the 1800s, several thousand species of Europe and abroad have been described in Helix. By the early 1900s, the genus was split into many separate genera, leaving only species closely related to its type species Helix pomatia in the genus. However, due to the previously broad concept of the genus, Helix is part of the original combination (basionym) of many gastropod names and there still are many nominal taxa described in Helix whose generic placement remains unresolved (taxa inquirenda), although they clearly do not refer to any species of Helix in its present sense.

Since the 2000s, Helix has been subject to extensive molecular phylogenetic studies and taxonomic revisions. These led to the exclusion of several species, most notably the garden snail, and inclusion of others (H. ceratina, H. nicaeensis). Maltzanella, for long considered a subgenus of Helix, was also formally removed from the genus, but is the sister group of Helix.

Two subgenera are currently recognized:

- Helix (Helix) Linnaeus, 1758
- Helix (Pelasga) Hesse, 1908
- Helix (Aegaeohelix) Korábek & Hausdorf, 2023

== Description ==
Helix comprises large land snail species, with shell diameters of 2–6 centimetres (3/4–2 1/4 in). The shell is globular to conical, with five darker bands that may be variably reduced or fuse together. The globular shell distinguishes Helix from most of the related genera (tribe Helicini), except for Maltzanella and Lindholmia. The surface has a structure of fine transversal ribs, developed to a varying degree, and there may be very fine spiral grooves as well. The shell is never malleated. Colour of the foot varies. It may be grey, brown, black or pink; the back of the foot is dark in several species.

The shells of Helix species are dextral. Sinistral individuals are very rare, but are occasionally found (e.g. H. pomatia, H. thessalica and H. lutescens).

Characters on the genital system have been used to define the genus and its subgenera. Unlike Cornu, the penis of Helix contains two papillae with a central opening. There appears to be a tendency for a shortening of the diverticulum of bursa copulatrix and of the eppiphallus, but there is an overlap with related genera in these characters. Mucous glands adjoining the dart sac are usually richly branched.

== Distribution ==
Helix is a western Palaearctic genus. The species diversity is concentrated to the Balkans and Anatolia, with the greatest phylogenetic diversity in Greece. The natural western distribution limits run through mainland France (Helix pomatia), Corsica (H. ceratina), and Algeria (H. melanostoma). In the north, the natural distribution of H. pomatia reaches central Germany and the southern margins of the North European plain. The southernmost species live in North Africa (H. melanostoma, H. pronuba) and the southern Levant (H. engaddensis). The eastern limits are reached in western Iran and Iraqi Kurdistan (H. salomonica) and in the Caucasus (H. lucorum); H. thessalica reaches through Ukraine at least to the western Russian frontier.

== Genetics ==
Haploid genome size was estimated to be nearly 4 Gbp (C-value 4 pg) with a GC-content of ~42%, but it is unclear which species was studied due to a discrepancy between the stated species and sample origin. The haploid number of chromosomes is 27 (studied species were H. lucorum, H. buchii, H. pomatia, H. gussoneana and H. straminea). In H. pomatia, all chromosomes have median or sub-median centromeres. Small supernumerary chromosomes were reported from H. pomatia from England.

The mitochondrial genome of H. pomatia is available (ca. 14 070 bp long).

== Genital system ==
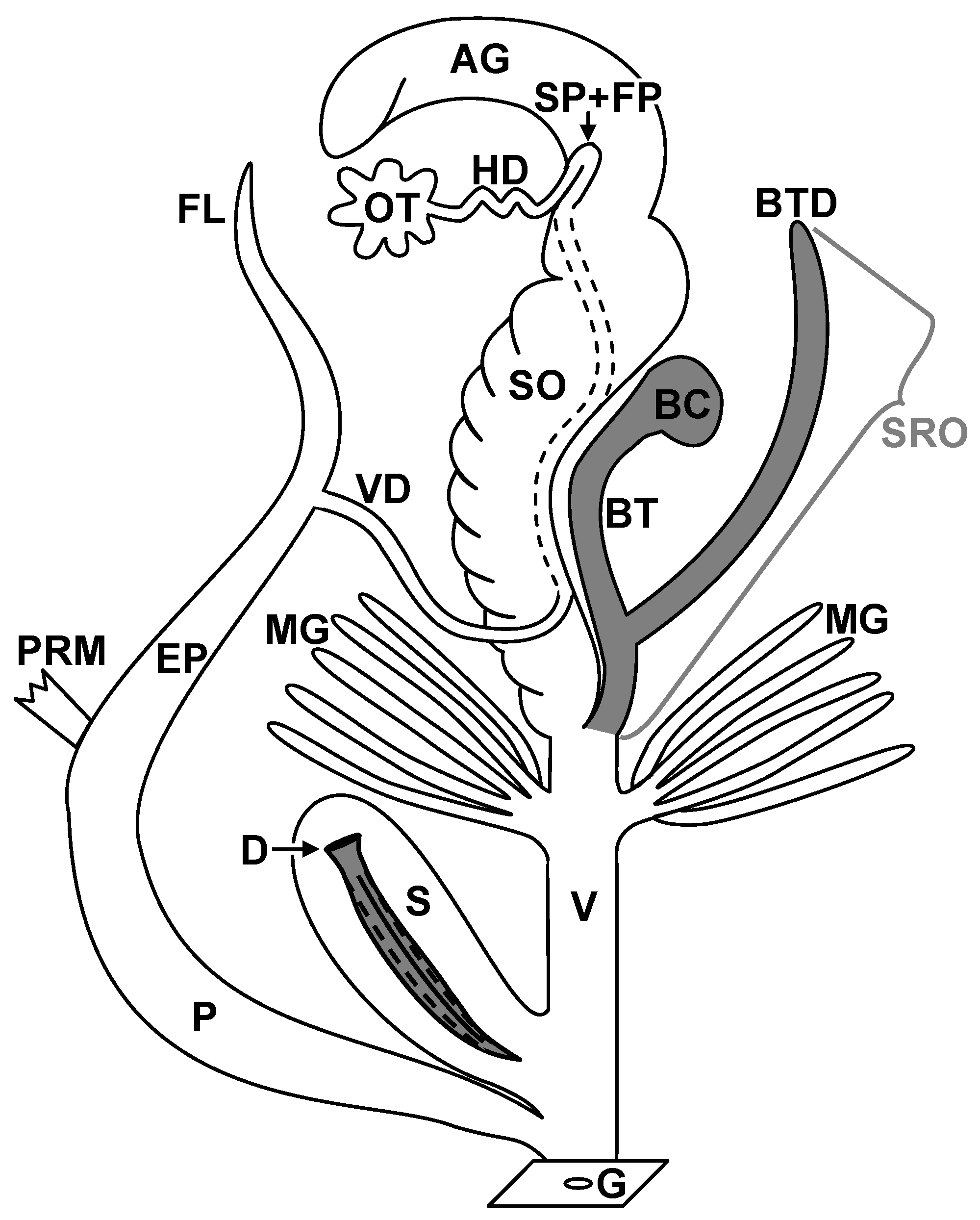
Scheme of the genital system in Helix and related Helicidae. D - love-dart, S - stylophore or dart sac, MG - mucous glands, P - penis, EP - epiphallus, FL - flagellum, BTD - bursa tract diverticulum, BT - bursa tract, BC - bursa copulatrix, SRO - spermatophore-receiving organ, SP - spermathecae, sperm storage organ, FP - fertilization pouch, AG - albumen gland, G - genital opening, HD - hermaphroditic duct, OT - ovotestis, PRM - penis retractor muscle, SO - spermoviduct, V - vaginal duct, VD - vas deferens

The structure of the genital system corresponds in most aspects to that of other Helicidae. Its anatomy and function have been studied in detail in H. pomatia.

As all stylommatophorans, Helix snails are hermaphrodites. Sperms and egg cells are produced in a common gonad, the ovotestis (hermaphroditic gland), which is embedded in the hepatopancreas (digestive gland) near the apex of the shell. Gametes are transported through a hermaphroditic duct (ovotestis duct) to the fertilization pouch–spermatheca complex (carrefour) embedded at the base of the albumen gland. In this organ, the foreign sperm (sperm from the other individual) is stored in spermathecal sacs (receptacula seminis) and egg fertilization takes place in the fertilisation pouch. The albumen gland provides nourishment for the developing fertilized eggs, and its size greatly varies with the stage of the reproductive cycle. The snail's own sperm and fertilized eggs are transported by specialised regions of the spermoviduct (sperm groove and uterus), which distally separate into a male (vas deferens) and female (free oviduct) parts of the genital system.

The male genitalia consist of a tube that serves the formation of a spermatophore and its transfer into the female parts of the mating partner. The penis is the most distal and muscular part. A spermatophore is formed in the epiphallus (between vas deferens and penis) and the flagellum (continuation of the epiphallus proximally from the vas deferens opening); the latter forms the tail of the spermatophore. During copulation, the penis everts (like a sleeve turned inside out) and is in this process inserted in the vagina. A retractor muscle attaches on the epiphallus and retracts the male genitalia after copulation.

The female part consists of a vagina (sometimes called the copulatory canal) and the bursa copulatrix (gametolytic gland) with its stalk and usually a diverticulum of the stalk. The vagina serves the transport of the foreign spermatophore and of eggs. The bursa is attached by a thin stalk to the vagina (marking the boundary between vagina and the free oviduct). The stalk in most cases bears a diverticulum, a blind tube that receives the front part of the spermatophore if present. The diverticulum has been proposed to be a remnant of a seminal duct that originally transported foreign sperm into the fertilization pouch. Sperm leave the tail of the spermatophore and migrate into the oviduct and then to the fertilization pouch; the vast majority of the sperm does not escape in this way and is digested in the bursa. In Helix, there is tendency for a reduction of the diverticulum and it can be missing in several species.

Dart apparatus, although positioned on the vagina, is functionally also part of the male genitalia. It is composed of a single muscular dart sac and two mucous glands (digitiform or accessory glands) on its sides. The mucous glands are branched at their base; the number of branches varies between Helix species. The single dart is aragonitic, straight or only weakly curved, with four blades (vanes) along its length and a corona at its base. The dart apparatus is missing in H. salomonica. The mucous glands produce mucus that covers the dart during shooting and is thereby injected into the body of the partner, where it induces shortening of the diverticulum and peristaltic movements of the bursa stalk that help the foreign sperm to escape lysis in the bursa.

The whole genital system forms from a single tubular invagination of the ectoderm. During the development, folds form along the internal space of the tube then eventually completely separate – first vas deferens and penis, then also bursa copulatrix. The male and female parts open into a common atrium and a genital pore positioned ventrally behind the right optic tentacle.

A rare teratological individual with paired male genitalia (penis, epiphallus, flagellum) has been reported from Germany.

== Reproduction ==
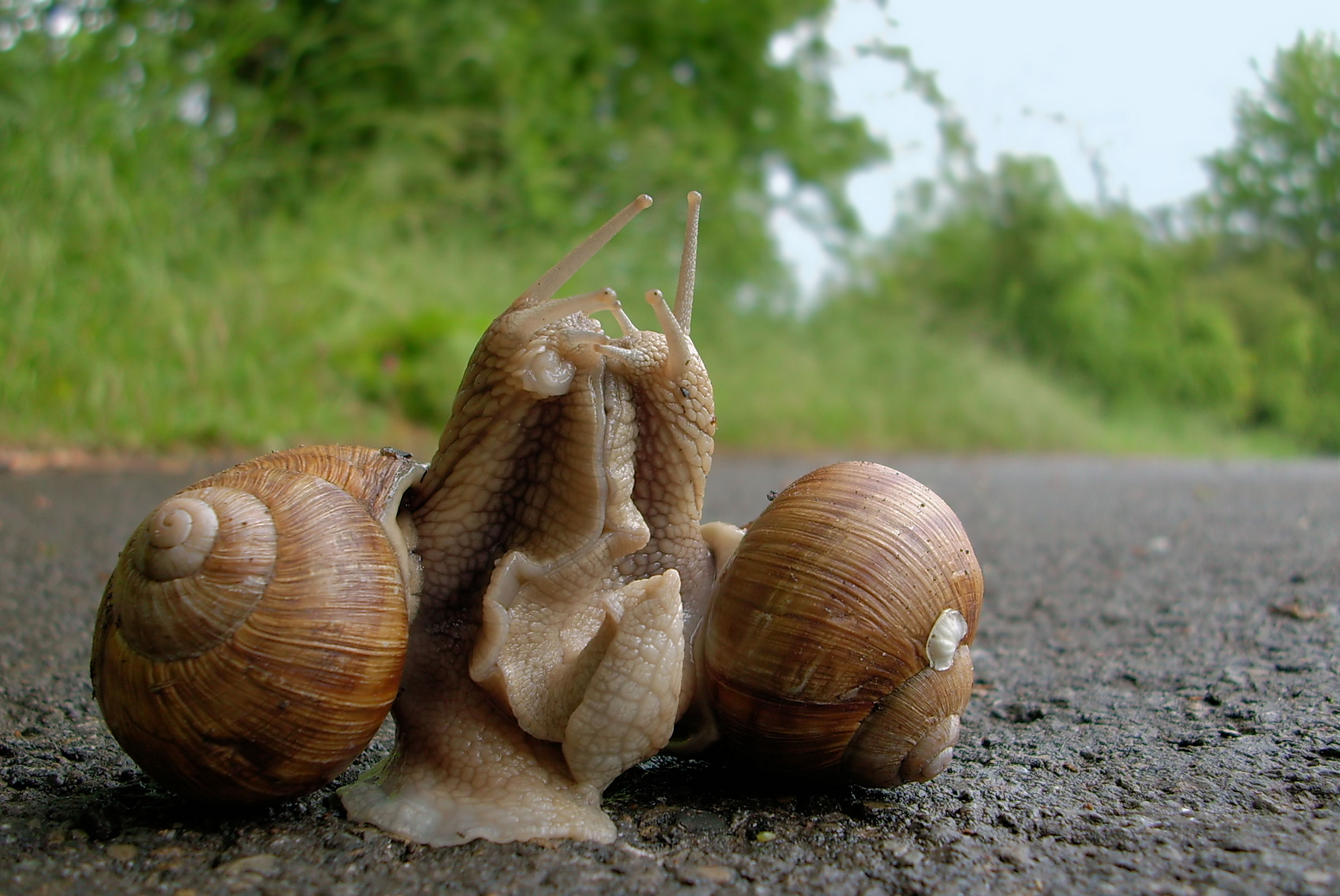
Helix pomatia in the initial phase of the mating sequence.

The aspects of reproduction have been studied primarily in H. pomatia, with limited information from other species.

Mating behaviour has been described several times for H. pomatia. In the initial phase, the two snails raise their feet and press the soles against each other and touch each other's tentacles and mouthparts. This takes 15–30 min. Some time later, the dart shooting takes place, although many matings progress without a love dart being employed. The mucous glands produce a whitish secretion just before the shooting, that contains hormones promoting the compound that improves preservation of foreign sperm in the receiving individual. Then, again after a pause, comes the copulation, usually preceded by several unsuccessful attempts in which the reciprocal insertion of penes is not achieved and the genital organs are partially retracted back into the body. Finally, both individuals simultaneously insert the penes into each other's female opening. Within ca. 4–7 min the spermatophore is formed and transferred, after which the snail disengage and retract the everted genital organs. However, the complete reception of the spermatophore takes another 2–3 hours, during which the snails remain partially retracted and inactive.

It has been reported that only one spermatophore is usually transferred during copulation in H. pomatia, so one animal functions as a male and one as a female in each mating. According to that report it is mostly the older snail who lay eggs, while younger function as males.

In H. pomatia, mating takes place mostly from May to June, but often continues more sporadically up to the autumn. However, because activity is dependent on climatic conditions, the timing of mating and egg laying differs in some other species.

In H. pomatia, the snails copulate usually with multiple mates. Received foreign sperm may be stored for more than a year before fertilization. Eggs are laid into a chamber dug in the soil by the parent about a month after mating. The eggs are formed only as the nest is built. As in other pulmonates, the eggs are rich in galactogen produced by the albumen gland. The eggshell is partially mineralized, with crystals of calcium cabonate in a flexible membrane. Clutch size is given in the literature within the range 3–93. Hatching follows roughly 25–26 (range 18–31) days after egg laying, but the snails remain additional 8–10 days in the nest. An individual may lay more than one clutch per season. The clutch size may be different in other species. Mean clutch size in H. lucorum is similar to that of H. pomatia, while the range reported for H. albescens (smaller body size than H. pomatia, with larger eggs) is only 7–22 eggs per clutch.

The sperm morphology follows the basic pattern known from "pulmonates". Mitochondria are fused and form a continuous sheath around the flagellum. Large part of mitochondrial derivative is made up by a proteinaceous paracrystalline structure, in which there is a glycogen-filled canal. The canal runs helically along the flagellum, forming a so-called glycogen helix. There is only a single, loosely coiled glycogen helix in Helix.

== Life history ==
In H. pomatia, sexual maturity is reached after 2–4 (–6) overwinterings, i.e. at the age of 2–4 (–6) years, but this differs between localities as well as between snails from the same clutch. Adult snails cease to grow and form a thickened lip around the aperture. However, the snails sometimes mate already shortly before the lip is formed. The life span of H. pomatia may reach 30 years in the wild. However, in the wild, they mostly live for just 5–9 years. The age of H. pomatia individuals can be estimated by counting growth interruptions on the shell and the number of layers deposited on the aperture margin lip.

Data from other species are very limited. Helix lucorum in Greece reaches maturity at 3 years. The small species H. ceratina reaches maturity after 1.5–2 years and lives 4–5 years.

The length of the life cycle is dependent on environmental conditions. The time from hatching to first egg laying can be shortened in H. pomatia to just 12–13 months under optimal conditions in the captivity, mainly by skipping hibernation.

== Ecology and behaviour ==
Species of Helix live in a variety of habitats and under very different climatic regimes. Some species are exclusively found in open limestone rocky habitats (H. secernenda), while others tolerate acidic bedrock (e.g. H. pelagonesica) or live predominantly in forests (e.g. H. thessalica). Members of the genus occur from temperate rainforests (H. buchii) to semi-arid regions (H. pronuba).

Food preferences are unknown for most species. Helix pomatia feeds on live plants as well as dead plant matter. Observations showed preference for some specific plant species and avoidance of others. The nettle Urtica dioica is a preferred food plant especially in juveniles. In a H. nucula from northern Israel, adults were found to mainly feed on dead, decaying plant matter early during their activity season, while later on they feed on fresh plants along with the newly hatched juveniles.

The activity of H. pomatia takes place mostly during the night, especially in juveniles. Even during favourable conditions, less than a half of the population at given site is active at the same time. A homing behaviour has been observed in H. pomatia. The snails disperse during the season, but tend to return to their hibernation grounds towards its end. During the season, they may have an area where they reside and from where they make excursions to known feeding areas and, if needed, attempts to locate new ones. It was also observed that the snails may migrate to specific sites for egg laying and aggregate for mating. The snails are able to find their way back from distances of tens of meters. Active dispersal during the lifetime may lead to displacement by more than 200 m.

Several species (e.g. H. pomatia, H. salomonica) build a thick, calcified epiphragm that closes the shell's aperture during hibernation or aestivation. The epiphragm is followed inside the shell by a few additional membranes made of dried mucus. When the animal emerges from the dormancy, it discards the calcareous epiphragm using the posterior part of the foot. Helix lucorum may have up to three calcareous epiphragms, but they are much thinner than in H. pomatia. The hibernation and aestivation takes place in the soil, where the snails bury themselves with the foot. Helix species differ in where they spend shorter periods of inactivity: some tend to remain on the soil surface, some hide in the soil (in particular species of the subgenus Pelasga), and some species often climb on vegetation (e.g. tree trunks and shrubs).

The hibernation or aestivation may take a substantial part of the year. For example, H. salomonica in Şırnak, Turkey, spent on average 85 days in hibernation and 165 days in aestivation during one year of observation. Also the period of activity of H. nucula may be only 4 months a year. In a study on H. lucorum from northern Greece, dormancy of the snails was induced mainly by low humidity. In H. pomatia, hibernation is induced by temperature and humidity, but there is also an influence of photoperiod.

== Biotic interactions ==
=== Predators and parasites ===
Several bird species prey on Helix species. This has been observed in Phasianus colchicus, Burhinus oedicemus, Coracias garrulus, Lanius excubitor, corvids, and probably other birds. Mammals prey on Helix, too. The known predators include hedgehog, mole, shrew, rodents (Rattus, Apodemus) and the wild boar. The slow worm consumes molluscs, including Helix. Helix snails are also attacked by various beetles and flies. The beetle predators belong to the families Carabidae and Lampyridae. The predation by birds, small mammals, and beetles mostly affects juveniles. Larvae of flies from several families attack Helix snails and may kill even adults (Phoridae, Muscidae, Sarcophagidae, Sciomyzidae).

A well known facultative parasite of land snails, including Helix, is the nematode Phasmarhabiditis hermaphrodita. Infection by a parasite, probably an unidentified trematode, may cause parasitic castration when the snails do not possess a gonad. Consequently, the shell growth, which would cease with the onset of sexual maturity, may continue, leading to unusually large shells lacking peristome and possessing about a half of a whorl more than usual. The parasitic mite Riccardoella limacum is found on Helix species.

The kinetoplastid Cryptobia helicis lives in the bursa copulatrix of Helix pomatia. The ciliate Tetrahymena limacis was also reported from Helix.

Bacterial diseases of gastropods including Helix are known, but this field is not well researched.

=== Influence on other species and the environment ===
Some bee species build their nests inside empty Helix shells (e.g. Rhodanthidium semptemdentatum).

== Human use ==
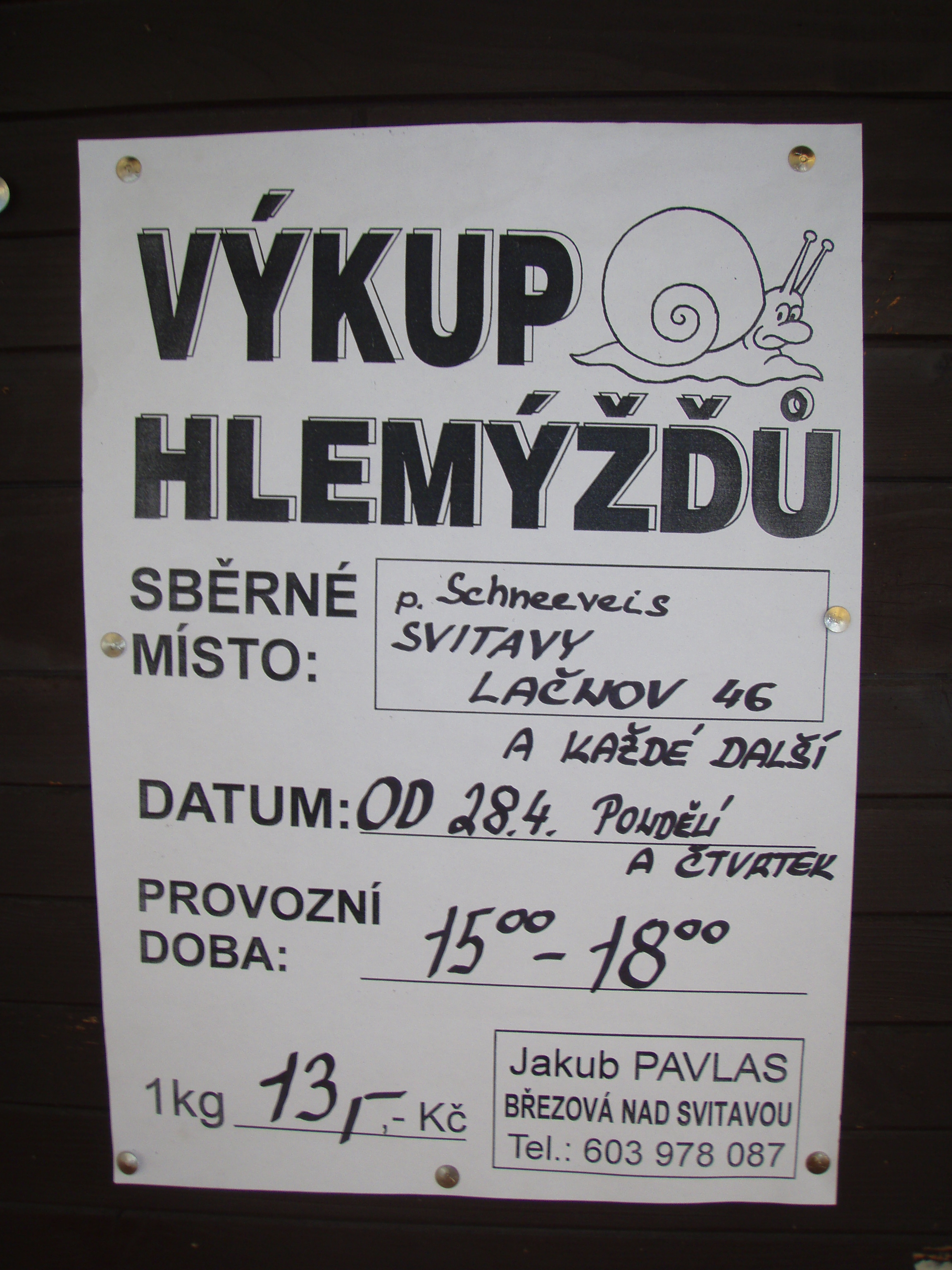
A poster advertising a buy up of Helix pomatia for food processing (Czechia, 2008).

Some species, above all H. pomatia and H. lucorum, are collected for human consumption. The culinary use dates back several millennia and has been evidenced for several species across the genus' range.

Mesolithic shell midden dated to 9370 ± 80 and 8110 ± 90 uncalibrated C-14 years bp and providing evidence of collecting was documented for H. pomatella in Abruzzo, Italy. Helix salomonica was consumed in the Zagros in large amount during the Pre-Pottery Neolithic, with evidence of consumption from ~12,000 BC. In North Africa, shell middens from the Caspian culture containing large amounts of H. melanostoma were found.

Ancient Romans collected snails for food and even held them in enclosures, as described by Marcus Terentius Varro (in De Re Rustica, and repeated by Pliny the Elder). It is believed that the Roman snail H. pomatia was introduced to England by the Romans.

== Conservation ==
Most of the species included in the IUCN Red List are classified as Least Concern. One of the species, H. ceratina, is critically endangered and the present known distribution is limited to a very small area near the Ajaccio airport.

In the past, collection of wild H. pomatia for food led to fears of over-exploitation and the introduction of protection by law in several countries.

== List of extant species ==
| Scientific name | IUCN Red List status | Distribution | Picture |
|---|---|---|---|
| Helix albescens Rossmässler, 1839 | LC^{IUCN} | | |
| Helix anctostoma Martens, 1874 | | Turkey (Nur Dagi and surroundings), Syria (northwestern) | |
| Helix ankae Korábek & Hausdorf, 2023 | | Turkey (northwestern Anatolia) | |
| Helix antiochiensis Kobelt, 1896 | | Syria | |
| Helix asemnis Bourguignat, 1860 | LC^{IUCN} | | |
| Helix borealis Mousson, 1859 | DD^{IUCN} | Greece | |
| Helix buchii (Dubois de Montpéreux, 1840) | | Turkey (northeastern), Georgia, Armenia (northern) | |
| Helix calabrica Westerlund, 1876 | | | |
| Helix ceratina Shuttleworth, 1843 | CR^{IUCN} | | |
| Helix cincta O. F. Müller, 1774 | LC^{IUCN} | | |
| Helix dormitoris Kobelt, 1898 | LC^{IUCN} | | |
| Helix engaddensis Bourguignat, 1852 | | Israel, West Bank, Jordan, Lebanon | |
| Helix fathallae Nägele, 1901 | | | |
| Helix figulina Rossmässler, 1839 | LC^{IUCN} | | |
| Helix godetiana Kobelt, 1878 | EN^{IUCN} | | |
| Helix gussoneana L. Pfeiffer, 1848 | | | |
| Helix kazouiniana Pallary, 1939 | | | |
| Helix ligata O. F. Müller, 1774 | DD^{IUCN} | | |
| Helix lucorum Linnaeus, 1758 | | | |
| Helix lutescens Rossmässler, 1837 | LC^{IUCN} | | |
| Helix melanostoma Draparnaud, 1801 | | | |
| Helix mileti Kobelt, 1906 | | | |
| Helix nicaeensis A. Férussac, 1821 | | Turkey | |
| Helix nucula Mousson, 1854 | LC^{IUCN} | | |
| Helix pachya Bourguignat, 1860 | | | |
| Helix pathetica Mousson, 1854 | | | |
| Helix pelagonesica (Rolle, 1898) | | | |
| Helix philibinensis Rossmässler, 1839 | LC^{IUCN} | Greece, North Macedonia, Bulgaria (southwestern), Albania (by Lake Prespa) | |
| Helix pomacella Mousson, 1854 | LC^{IUCN} | | |
| Helix pomatella Kobelt, 1876 | | | |
| Helix pomatia Linnaeus, 1758 | LC^{IUCN} | | |
| Helix pronuba Westerlund, 1879 | | Egypt, Libya, Tunisia (southern), Greece (Crete and other islands, introduced) | |
| Helix salomonica Nägele, 1899 | | Turkey (southeastern), Iran (western), Iraq (Kurdistan) | |
| Helix schlaeflii Mousson, 1859 | | Albania (central and southern), Greece, North Macedonia (Galičica) | |
| Helix secernenda Rossmässler, 1847 | LC^{IUCN} | Croatia, Bosnia and Herzegovina, Montenegro, Albania (northern) | Helix secernenda (Montenegro) |
| Helix straminea Briganti, 1825 | LC^{IUCN} | Albania, North Macedonia (eastern), Italy | Helix straminea (Italy) |
| Helix thessalica O. Boettger, 1886 | LC^{IUCN} | | |
| Helix valentini Kobelt, 1891 | EN^{IUCN} | | |
| Helix vladika (Kobelt, 1898) | LC^{IUCN} | | |

== Fossil record ==
Several extinct taxa of Helix have been described:

- Helix jasonis Mayer, 1856 (Ukraine: Sevastopol. Miocene: Tortonian)
- Helix pseudoligata Sinzov, 1897 (Ukraine. Miocene: Sarmatian)
- Helix kadolskyi Neubauer & Harzhauser, 2023 (nom. nov. for Helix toulai Kojumdgieva, 1969) (Bulgaria: Balchik. Miocene: middle Tortonian)
- Helix barbeyana De Stefani in De Stefani et al., 1891
- Helix krejcii Wenz in Krejci-Graf & Wenz, 1926
- Helix mrazeci Sevastos, 1922
- Helix sublutescens Wenz in Krejci & Wenz, 1926
- Helix maeotica Steklov, 1966 (Russia: Chechnya: river Gums. Miocene: Maeotian=?Tortonian)
- Helix varnensis Toula, 1892 (Bulgaria: Varna. Miocene: Sarmatian)
- Helix lucorum supralevantina Wenz, 1942 (Romania. Pliocene)

Some extant species are known from Quaternary deposits. The most studied species in this respect is H. pomatia, where the fossils have been used to document the earliest postglacial occurrences in Central Europe. The earliest record in Czechia was dated directly by radiocarbon to 10,120-9,690 BP (but is likely a few hundred years younger); fossils presumably older than 9,402–9,027 BP or 9,403–9,003 BP were found in Baden-Württemberg, Germany. Such records document the speed at which Helix species may extends their ranges by natural means of dispersal.

The quaternary land snail fossil record in more southern parts of Europe is scarce, but some records of Helix exist. Helix figulina dated ~16,000 BP was recorded from the Greek island Antikythera. Helix borealis shells dated to 8,000–27,000 BP were reported from another island, Gavdos.

Other records come from archaeological contexts.

== Phylogeny ==
The phylogenetic relationships between Helix and related genera as well as the internal relationships within the genus have been so far studied only using partial sequences of mitochondrial genes and of the nuclear rRNA gene cluster.

The cladogram shown is based on phylogenetic analyses of mitochondrial sequence data.

- Maltzanella
  - Maltzanella maltzani
  - Maltzanella dickhauti
  - Maltzanella escherichi
- Helix
  - Helix (Pelasga)
    - Helix figulina
    - Helix nucula
    - Helix kazouiniana
    - Helix salomonica
    - Helix engaddensis
  - Helix (Helix)
    - Mediterranean clade
      - - Helix fathallae
        - - Helix anctostoma
          - Helix valentini
          - Helix cincta
      - Helix melanostoma
      - Helix pronuba
      - Helix borealis
      - - Helix ligata
        - Helix mileti
        - Helix pomatella
        - Helix gussoneana
        - Helix calabrica
      - Helix ceratina
    - European clade
      - Helix lutescens
      - Helix secernenda
      - Helix thessalica
      - Helix pomatia
      - Helix dormitoris
      - Helix shlaeflii
      - - Helix vladika
        - Helix straminea
    - Anatolian clade
      - - Helix asemnis
        - Helix ankae
      - Helix pathetica
      - Helix pomacella
      - - Helix nicaeensis
        - Helix lucorum
    - Helix albescens
    - Helix philibinensis
    - Helix pelagonesica
    - Helix buchii
  - Aegaeohelix
    Helix godetiana

== Synonyms ==
The following genus-level taxa are considered synonyms of Helix:

- Callunea Scudder, 1882
- Cochlea Da Costa, 1778
- Coenatoria Held, 1838
- Cunula Pallary, 1936
- Glischrus S. Studer, 1820
- Helicites W. Martin, 1809 (Established for fossils of Helix to distinguish them from extant members of that taxon. Invalid, available only for the purposes of the Principle of Homonymy (Art. 20))
- Helicogena A. Férussac, 1821
- Megastoma Scudder, 1882
- Naegelea P. Hesse, 1918
- Pachyphallus P. Hesse, 1918
- Pentataenia A. Schmidt, 1855 (junior objective synonym)
- Physospira Boettger, 1914
- Pomatia Beck, 1837
- Pomatiana Fagot, 1903
- Pomatiella Pallary, 1909
- Pseudofigulina P. Hesse, 1917
- Rhododerma P. Hesse, 1918
- Tacheopsis Boettger, 1909
- Tammouzia Pallary, 1939
- Tyrrhenaria P. Hesse, 1918
