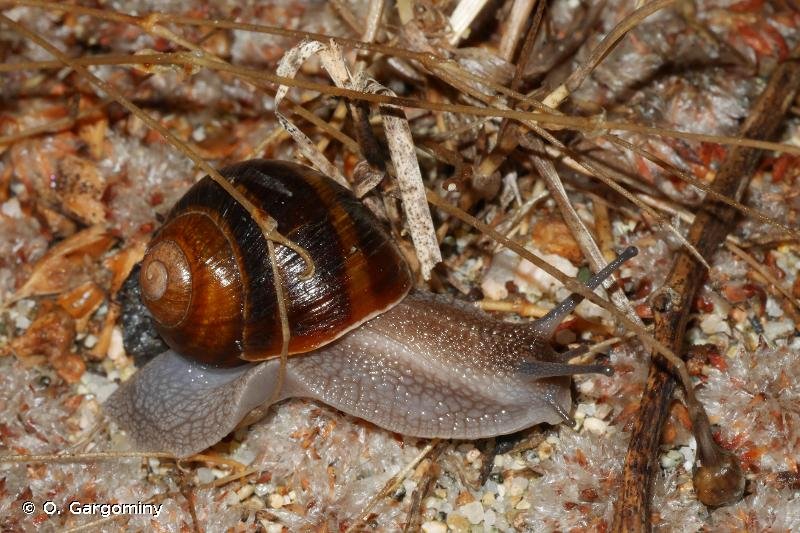

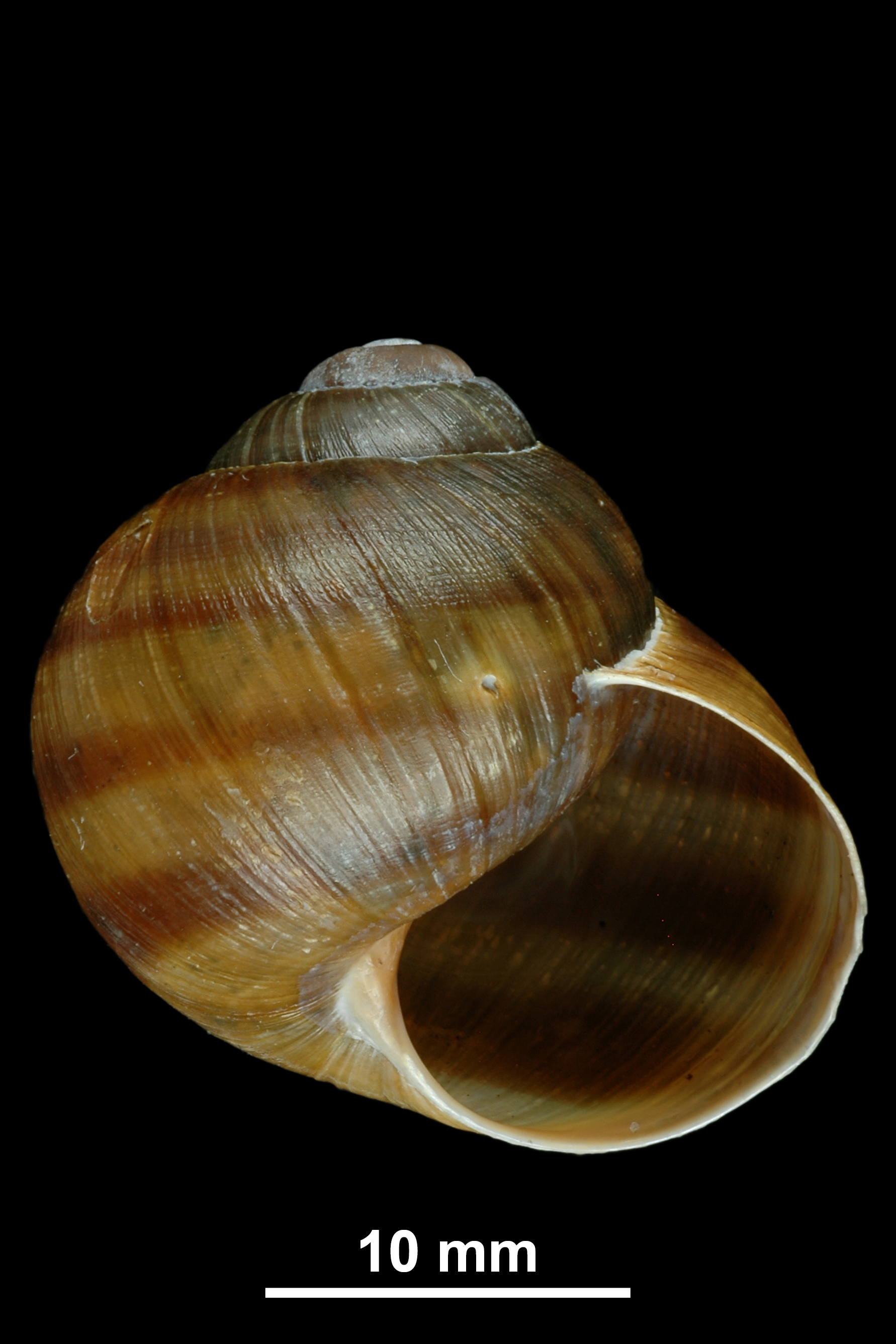
- Shell of Helix ceratina (specimen at MNHN, Paris)

Conservation status
- Critically Endangered (IUCN 3.1)

Scientific classification
- Kingdom: Animalia
- Phylum: Mollusca
- Class: Gastropoda
- Order: Stylommatophora
- Superfamily: Helicoidea
- Family: Helicidae
- Subfamily: Helicinae
- Tribe: Helicini
- Genus: Helix
- Species: H. ceratina

Binomial name
- Helix ceratina Shuttleworth, 1843)

Synonyms
- Helix tristis Pfeiffer, 1845; Tyrrhenaria ceratina (Shuttleworth, 1843) (chresonym)

= Helix ceratina =

Species of gastropod

Helix ceratina, the Corsican snail, is a species of air-breathing land snail, a terrestrial pulmonate gastropod mollusk in the family Helicidae, the typical snails.

For a species of Helix, H. ceratina is a small snail of shell diameter max. 24 mm (28 in fossil individuals). The shell is olive-brown, with darker bands, and thin-walled.

This species is endemic to Corsica. The only known extant population lives at Campo dell'Oro near the Ajaccio airport. The inhabited area was estimated at 0.34 km^{2}. However, the species was distributed more widely in prehistoric times, as fossil shells were found at three other localities on the shore (Bastia: Toga, Piana: Plage d'Arone, Bonifacio). At the site in Bonifacio, the shells were dated to the Neolithic (5600-5000 BC and 3000-2500 BC, respectively; only the older date is mentioned in a later publication). Repeated searches since the 1990s did not reveal any populations additional to that near Ajaccio.

Although still sometimes classified in a monotypic genus Tyrrhenaria, the species is a member of the genus Helix, related to species such as Helix ligata and Helix melanostoma.

It inhabits biotopes on granitic sands near the shore, with vegetation characterized by Crucianella maritima, Scrophularia ramosissima and Genista salzmannii ssp. salzmannii. The snails prefer sites where the vegetation is open and the surface is not covered by lichens. They are active during the night from October to June, if it rains. During dry and hot periods, the snails dig up to 60 cm into the soil and form a convex, calcareous epiphragm.

Mating was observed in captivity from late August to mid-October. Eggs were laid 3–5 days after mating. Eggs are large (diameter 5-7 mm) and ovoid. Clutch size between 6 and 19 was recorded; eggs are laid into underground nests. Hatching takes place after 15-16 days. Shells of the newly hatched juveniles measure 5-6 mm.

Helix ceratina feeds on fresh leaves in the spring, but the diet changes to decaying plant matter in the autumn. Genista salzmannii is the most important part of the diet (found in 80% of faeces); Matthiola sinuata, Jasione montana and grasses are also eaten. In captivity, the snails were observed to ingest the sand substrate.
