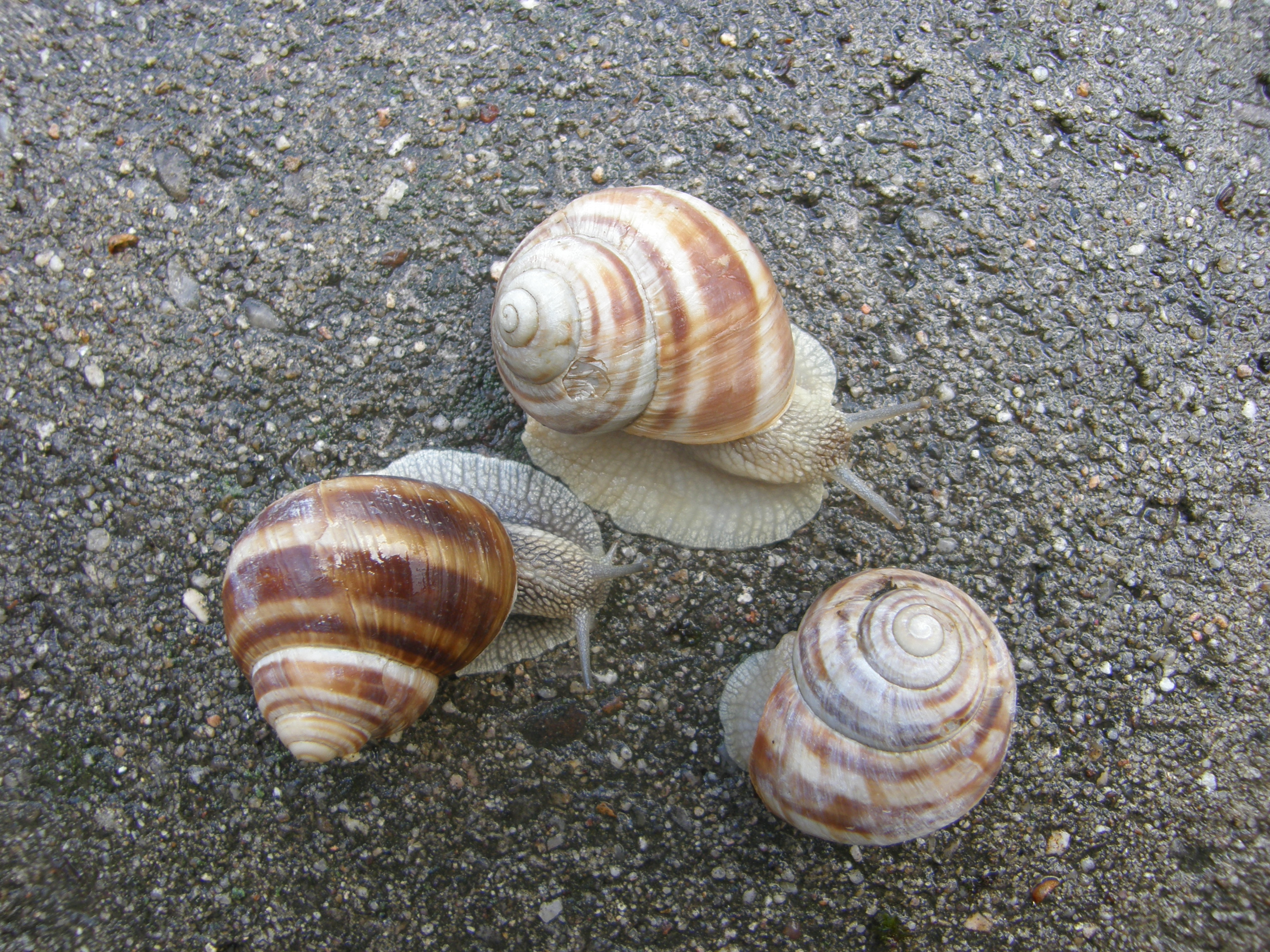

Scientific classification
- Kingdom: Animalia
- Phylum: Mollusca
- Class: Gastropoda
- Order: Stylommatophora
- Family: Helicidae
- Subfamily: Helicinae
- Tribe: Helicini
- Genus: Helix
- Species: H. dormitoris

Binomial name
- Helix dormitoris (Kobelt, 1898)

Synonyms
- Helix (Helicogena) kolasinensis Kobelt, 1906 (unjustified emendation of the original name); Helix (Helicogena) kolasinensis var. bosnica Kobelt, 1906 (junior synonym); Helix (Helicogena) pivensis Kobelt, 1906 (junior synonym); Helix (Helicogena) pivensis lubnicensis Kobelt, 1906 (junior synonym); Helix (Helicogena) stolacensis Kobelt, 1906 (junior synonym); Helix (Helicogena) sturanyi Kobelt, 1906 (junior synonym); Helix (Helix) dormitoris (Kobelt, 1898) · alternate representation; Helix dormitoris arnautorum Knipper, 1939 (junior synonym); Helix dormitoris hajlensis Knipper, 1939 (junior synonym); Helix kolaschinensis Kobelt, 1898 (junior synonym); Pomatia dormitoris Kobelt, 1898 (original combination); Pomatia kolaschinensis Kobelt, 1898 (junior synonym)

= Helix dormitoris =

Species of land snail

Helix dormitoris is a species of large, air-breathing land snail native to mountainous regions of Montenegro, eastern Bosnia and Herzegovina and western Serbia.
