= Maltzanella =

Scientific classification
- Kingdom: Animalia
- Phylum: Mollusca
- Class: Gastropoda
- Order: Stylommatophora
- Family: Helicidae
- Subfamily: Helicinae
- Tribe: Helicini
- Genus: Maltzanella; Hesse, 1917

Synonyms
- Helix (Maltzanella) P. Hesse, 1917; Maltzania P. Hesse, 1908 (preoccupied )

Genus of land snails

Maltzanella is a genus of terrestrial pulmonate gastropod mollusks in the family Helicidae, the typical snails. It has two known species distributed in Turkey. The shell is similar to Helix, which is the sister lineage to Maltzanella.

== Species ==
- Maltzanella maltzani (Kobelt, 1903)
- Maltzanella dickhauti (Kobelt, 1883)
- Maltzanella escherichi (Boettger, 1898)
