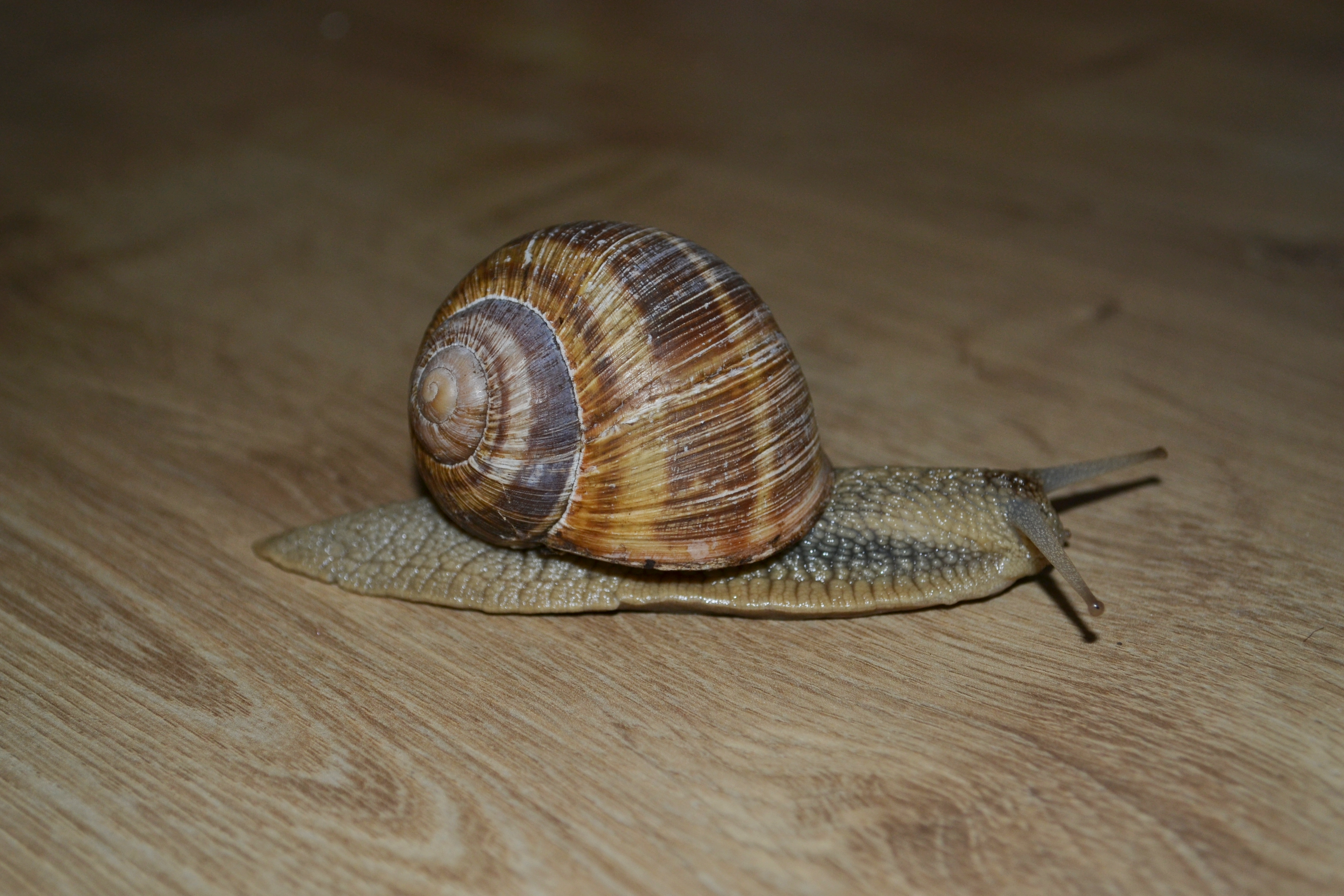

Scientific classification
- Kingdom: Animalia
- Phylum: Mollusca
- Class: Gastropoda
- Order: Stylommatophora
- Family: Helicidae
- Subfamily: Helicinae
- Tribe: Helicini
- Genus: Helix
- Species: H. thessalica

Binomial name
- Helix thessalica O. Boettger, 1886

Synonyms
- Helix (Helicogena) pomatia var. thessalica O. Boettger, 1886 (basionym); Helix (Helix) thessalica O. Boettger, 1886 alternate representation

= Helix thessalica =

Species of snail

Helix thessalica is a species of large, air-breathing land snail native to Europe. It is externally similar to Helix pomatia, but has a dark grey penis and vagina. The species has been long considered synonymous with H. pomatia.

== Distribution ==
The type locality lies in Thessaly in Greece, where are the southernmost occurrences in Ossa and Pelion. The species is the distributed in northern Greece, North Macedonia, Bulgaria, Montenegro, Kosovo, southern and central Serbia and in the Romanian Carpathians. A small part of the distribution range lies in the Western Carpathians (central Slovakia, Bükk in Hungary), in Czechia it lives a restricted area in the valleys of Jihlava and Oslava. East of the Carpathians, H. thessalica lives in Moldova, Ukraine (scattered from the Podolian Upland up to Kharkiv) and Russia (Belgorod oblast near Valuyki, possibly introduced population is known from Ulyanovsk).
