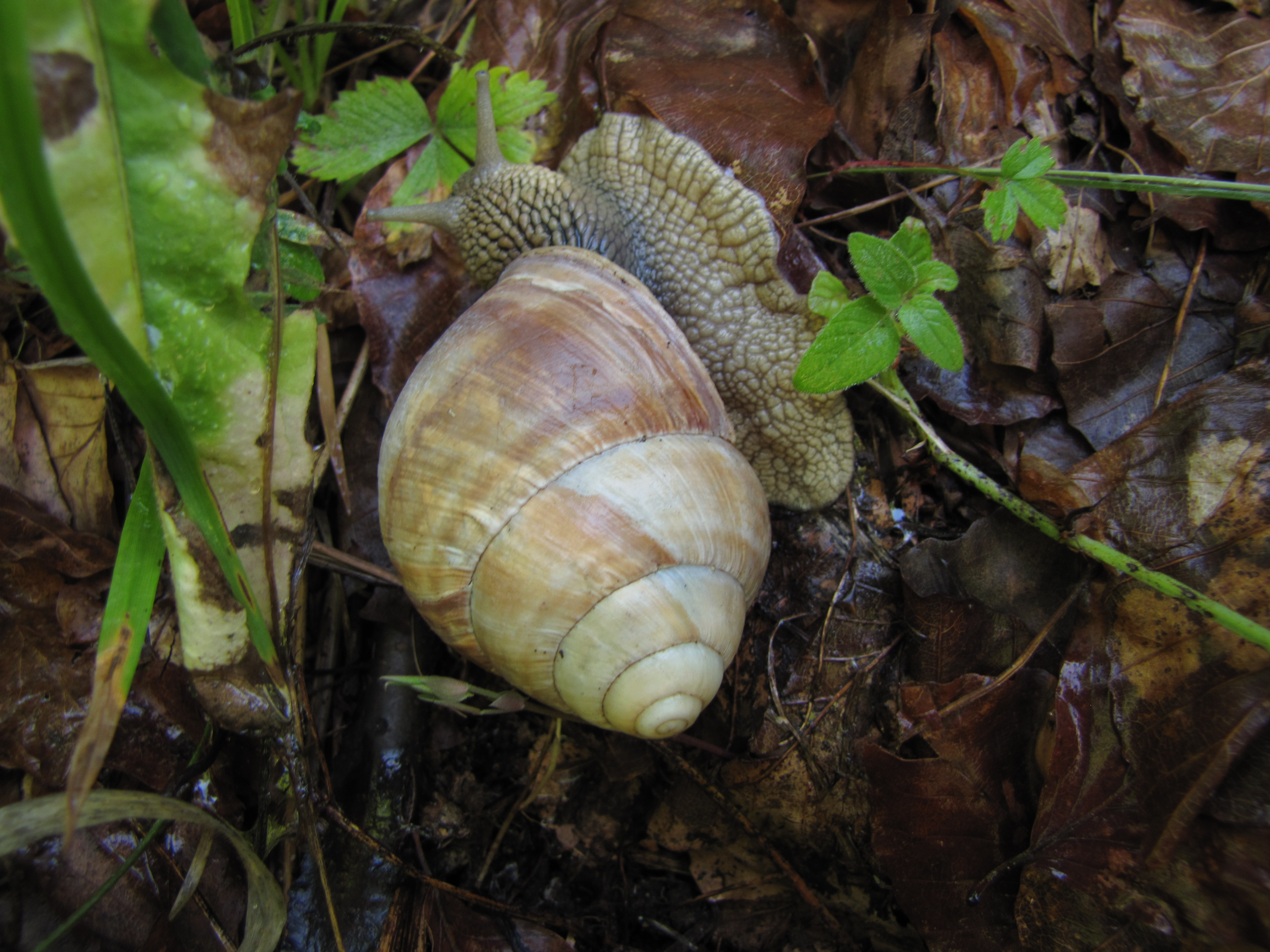

Conservation status
- Least Concern (IUCN 3.1)

Scientific classification
- Kingdom: Animalia
- Phylum: Mollusca
- Class: Gastropoda
- Order: Stylommatophora
- Family: Helicidae
- Subfamily: Helicinae
- Tribe: Helicini
- Genus: Helix
- Species: H. vladika

Binomial name
- Helix vladika (Kobelt, 1898)

Synonyms
- Helix (Helicogena) wohlberedti Kobelt, 1905 (junior synonym); Helix (Helicogena) wohlberedti var. poljensis Kobelt, 1905 (junior synonym); Helix (Helix) vladica (Kobelt, 1898) alternate representation; Helix secernenda var. insignis Brancsik, 1890 (invalid: junior homonym of H. insignis Zieten, 183); Helix vladica pomatiaeformis Kobelt, 1905 (junior synonym); Pomatia vladica Kobelt, 1898 (original combination)

= Helix vladika =

Species of land snail

Helix vladika is a species of large, air-breathing land snail native to Montenegro, Albania and Serbia. It has a brown, conical shell. It is the largest land snail species in Europe. Typical habitat are beech forests. The species is closely related to Helix straminea.
