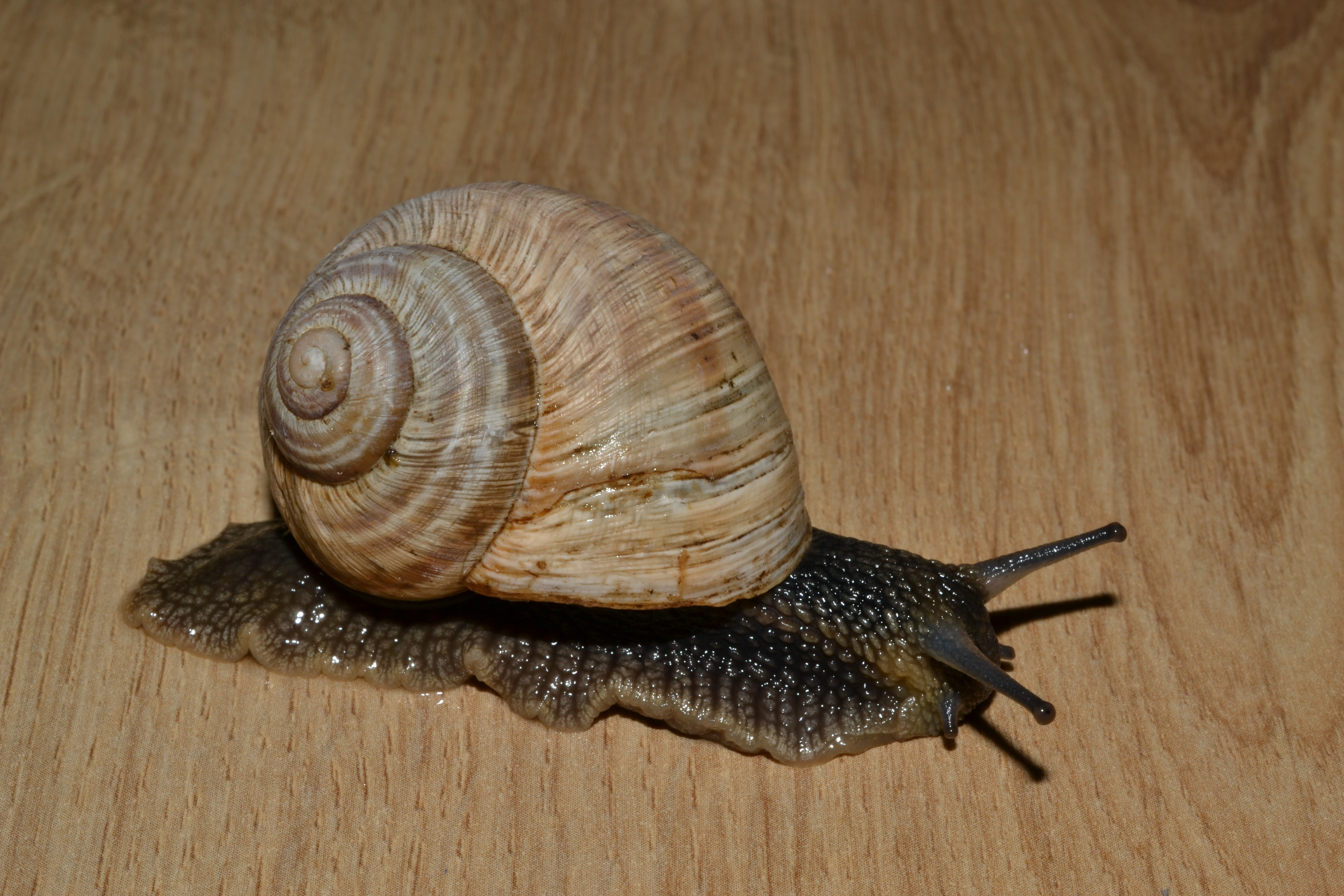

Scientific classification
- Kingdom: Animalia
- Phylum: Mollusca
- Class: Gastropoda
- Order: Stylommatophora
- Family: Helicidae
- Subfamily: Helicinae
- Tribe: Helicini
- Genus: Helix
- Species: H. ligata

Binomial name
- Helix ligata Müller, 1774

Synonyms
- Helix (Helix) ligata O. F. Müller, 1774 · alternate representation; Pomatia ligata (O. F. Müller, 1774)

= Helix ligata =

Species of land snail

Helix ligata is a species of large, air-breathing land snail native to central and southern Italy.

== Taxonomy ==
Helix ligata is one of several closely related species in a group that diversified in the Apennines. The group still waits for a formal taxonomic revision; the most recent taxonomy proposed based on mitochondrial phylogeny presumed that there are at least five species:

- Helix ligata
- Helix pomatella
- Helix miletti
- Helix gussoneana
- Helix calabrica
