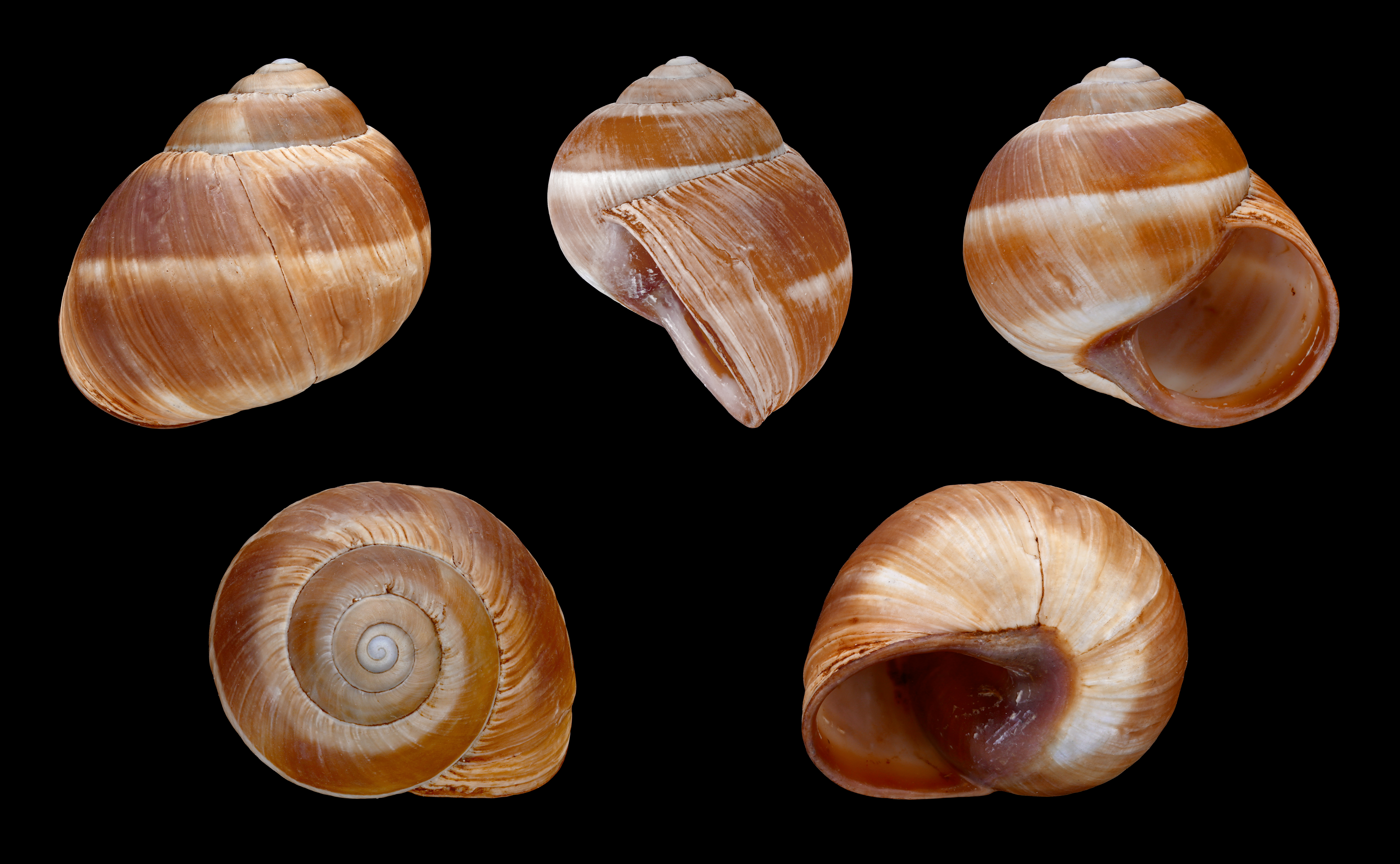

Scientific classification
- Kingdom: Animalia
- Phylum: Mollusca
- Class: Gastropoda
- Order: Stylommatophora
- Family: Helicidae
- Genus: Helix
- Species: H. cincta

Binomial name
- Helix cincta Müller, 1774

= Helix cincta =

Species of mollusc

Helix cincta is a species of gastropods belonging to the family Helicidae.

== Taxonomy ==
Helix cincta is related to several other Helix species with brown shell aperture margins (Helix borealis, Helix melanostoma, Helix pronuba, etc.). Among these, it is part of a group of closely related species that includes also Helix anctostoma and Helix valentini. So far, it is not clear how well are these two separated from H. cincta, or if they rather represent extremes of its conchological variation.

Helix anctostoma has been originally described from the Belen Pass in the Hatay Province of Turkey, and is characterised by a knob on the columellar aperture margin. However, such knob sometimes occurs in European H. cincta as well. Recently, forms with more flattened shells occurring by the Turkish-Syrian frontier were also classified as H. anctostoma.

Helix valentini has been described from an east-Aegean island, but naturally occurs in the Hatay province and northwestern Syria (known as Helix antiochiensis). It has a larger, more conical shell; often there are fine whitish spots in the brown spiral bands.

== Distribution ==
The current distribution is disjunctive, with four separated areas of occurrence. The species originates from Syria or adjacent Turkey, it is most likely introduced in all other parts of its range. These are Cyprus, western Anatolia and eastern Aegean islands, and northeastern Italy with the northern Adriatic coast up to Dalmatia.
