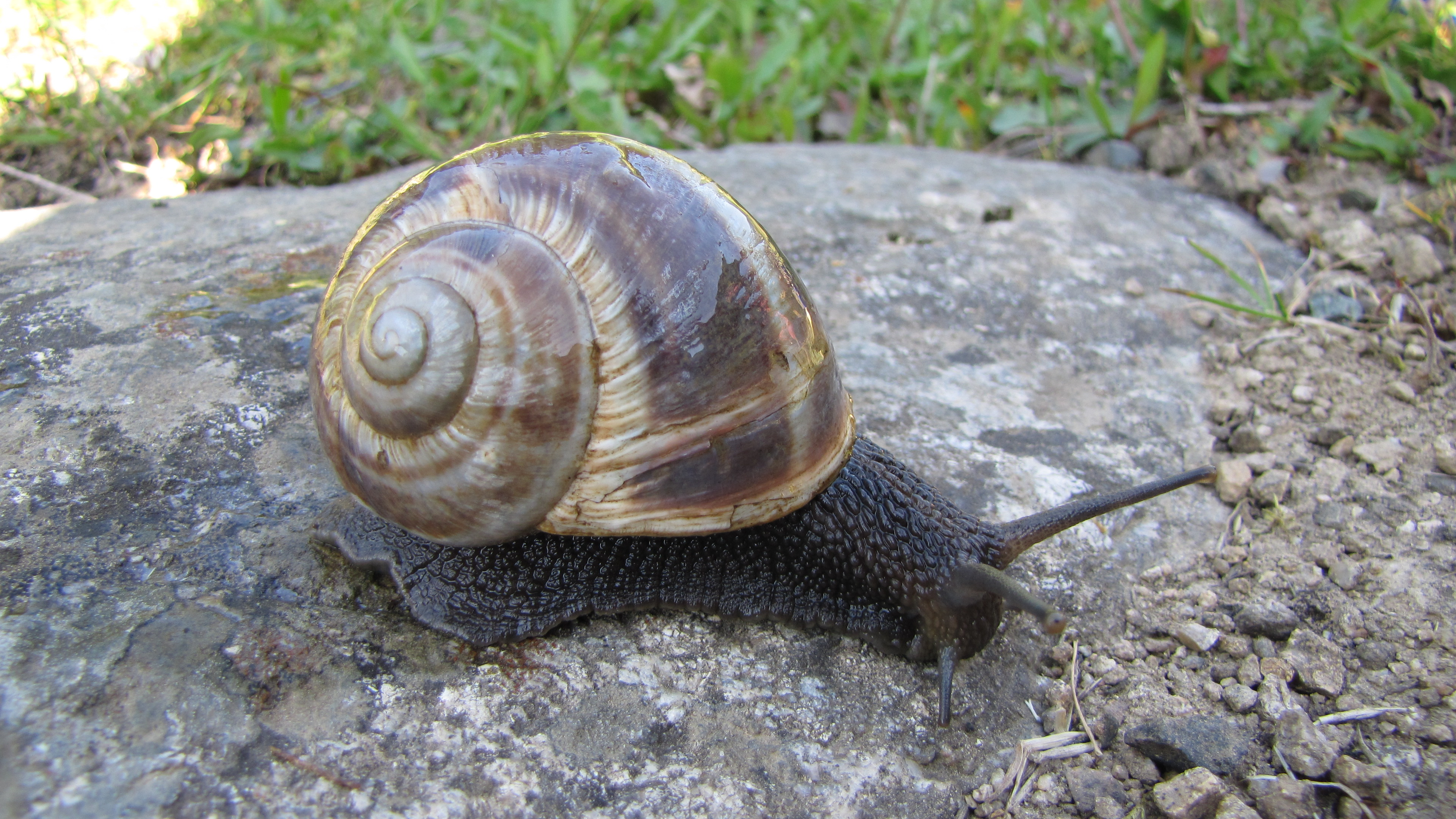

Scientific classification
- Kingdom: Animalia
- Phylum: Mollusca
- Class: Gastropoda
- Order: Stylommatophora
- Family: Helicidae
- Subfamily: Helicinae
- Tribe: Helicini
- Genus: Helix
- Species: H. buchii

Binomial name
- Helix buchii Dubois de Montpéreux, 1839

Synonyms
- Helix (Helicogena) duschekensis Kobelt, 1906 (junior synonym); Helix (Helix) buchii Dubois de Montpéreux, 1840 · alternate representation; Helix buchii var. adsharica Kobelt, 1906 (junior synonym); Helix buchii var. karabaghensis Kobelt, 1904 (junior synonym); Helix goderdziana Mumladze, Tarkhnishvili & Pokryszko, 2008 junior subjective synonym; Helix pomatia var. decussata Mortillet, 1854 (junior synonym); Pomatia sieversi Kobelt, 1903 (junior synonym)

= Helix buchii =

Species of land snail

Helix buchii is a species of large, air-breathing land snail native to northeastern Turkey, Georgia, and northern Armenia.
