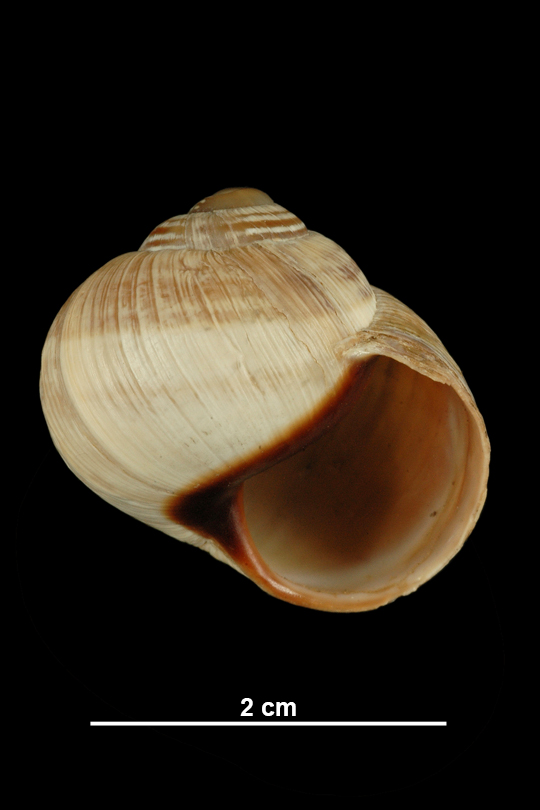
- Shell of Helix melanostoma (specimen at MNHN, Paris)

Scientific classification
- Kingdom: Animalia
- Phylum: Mollusca
- Class: Gastropoda
- Order: Stylommatophora
- Family: Helicidae
- Subfamily: Helicinae
- Tribe: Helicini
- Genus: Helix
- Species: H. melanostoma

Binomial name
- Helix melanostoma Draparnaud, 1801

Synonyms
- Helix (Helix) melanostoma Draparnaud, 1801· accepted, alternate representation; Helix melanonixia Bourguignat, 1876 (junior synonym); Helix melanostoma var. candida Rossmässler, 1839 (junior synonym); Helix melanostoma var. vittata Rossmässler, 1839 (invalid; not O. F. Müller, 1774); Helix pachypleura Bourguignat, 1882 (junior synonym); Helix uthicensis Pechaud, 1883 (junior synonym); Pomatia melanostoma (Draparnaud, 1801); Pomatia melanostoma var. doliolum Pallary, 1939 (junior synonym)

= Helix melanostoma =

Species of gastropod

Helix melanostoma is a species of air-breathing land snail, a terrestrial pulmonate gastropod mollusk in the subfamily Helicinae of the family Helicidae, the typical snails.

== Appearance ==
Colour of the shell greyish or almost white. The inner margin of the mouth brown or violet. Size about 38 × 36 to 28 × 33 mm.

== Distribution ==
- Helix melanostoma occurs in Algeria, Tunisia and South France
