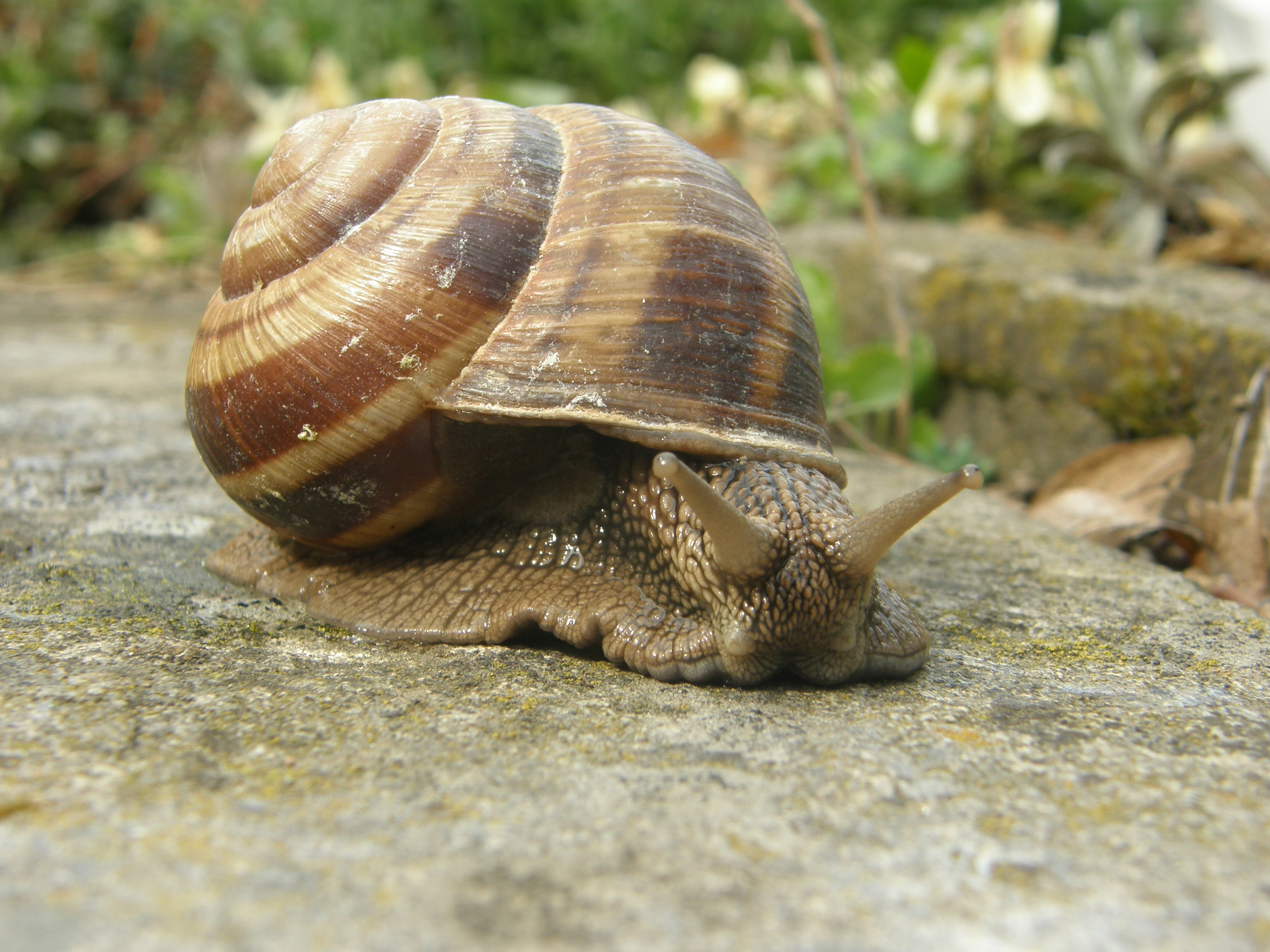

Conservation status
- Least Concern (IUCN 3.1)

Scientific classification
- Kingdom: Animalia
- Phylum: Mollusca
- Class: Gastropoda
- Order: Stylommatophora
- Family: Helicidae
- Tribe: Helicini
- Genus: Helix
- Subgenus: Helix
- Species: H. straminea

Binomial name
- Helix straminea Briganti 1825

Synonyms
- Helix (Helix) straminea Briganti, 1825 · alternate representation; Helix lucorum var. annosa Mascarini, 1892 (junior synonym); Helix lucorum var. candida Mascarini, 1892 (junior synonym); Helix straminea var. elongata Bourguignat, 1860 (invalid: junior homonym of H....); Helix straminiformis Bourguignat, 1876 (junior synonym); Helix yleobia Bourguignat, 1883 (junior synonym)

= Helix straminea =

Species of snail

Helix straminea is a species of large, air-breathing land snail native to North Macedonia, Albania and Italy.

It is closely related to Helix vladika, but it is similar to some colour forms of H. lucorum, with which it used to be confused.
