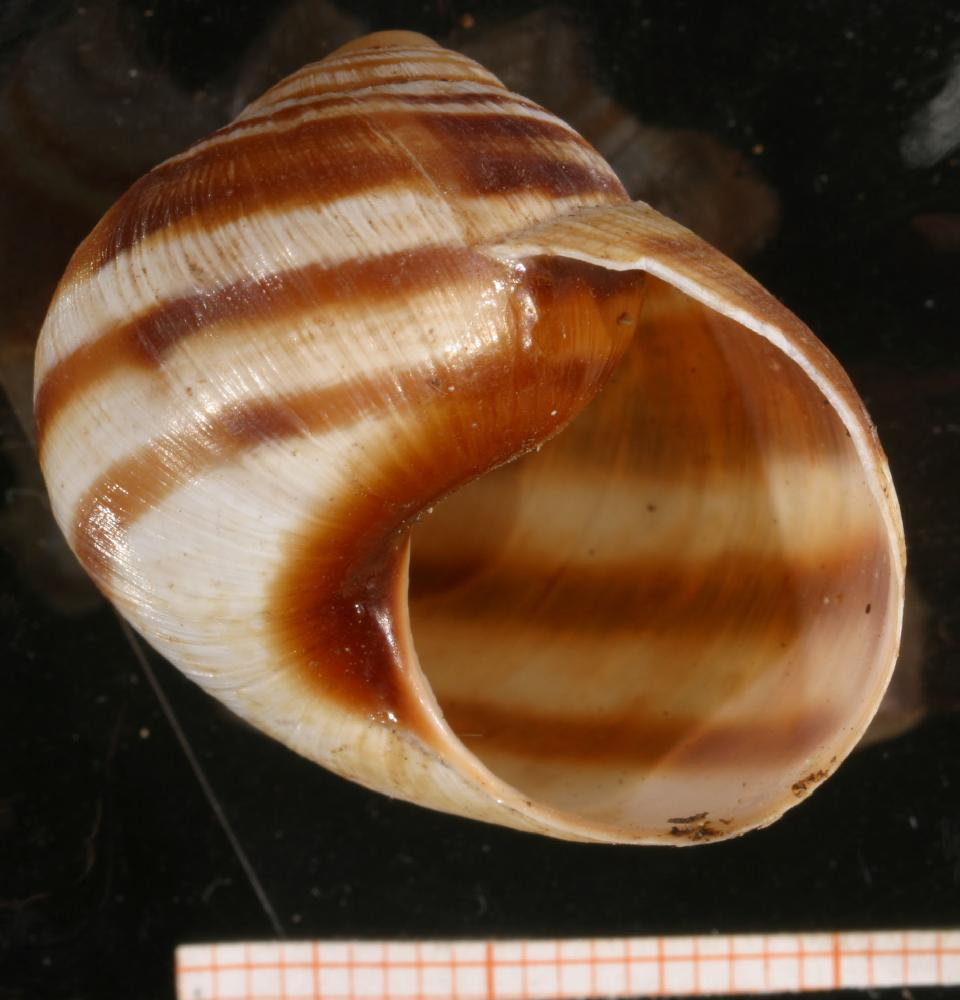

Conservation status
- Least Concern (IUCN 3.1)

Scientific classification
- Kingdom: Animalia
- Phylum: Mollusca
- Class: Gastropoda
- Order: Stylommatophora
- Family: Helicidae
- Genus: Helix
- Species: H. nucula

Binomial name
- Helix nucula Mousson, 1854

= Helix nucula =

Species of gastropod

Helix nucula is a species of air-breathing land snail, a terrestrial pulmonate gastropod mollusk in the family Helicidae, the typical snails. It has a rounded shell with white aperture margins; it differs from the similar Helix figulina by fine spiral grooves on the upper shell surface. Previously, the name H. nucula was used also for Helix pronuba, an unrelated species occurring in North Africa and on Crete, creating some confusion in the literature.

== Distribution ==
This land snail inhabits areas near the south and west coasts of Turkey as well as eastern Aegean Islands of Greece. However, its native range is probably mainly Lebanon, Syria and Cyprus.

== Taxonomy ==
Helix pachya from Lebanon and Syria is not a distinct lineage in the analysed mitochondrial data, and is probably synonymous with H. nucula.
