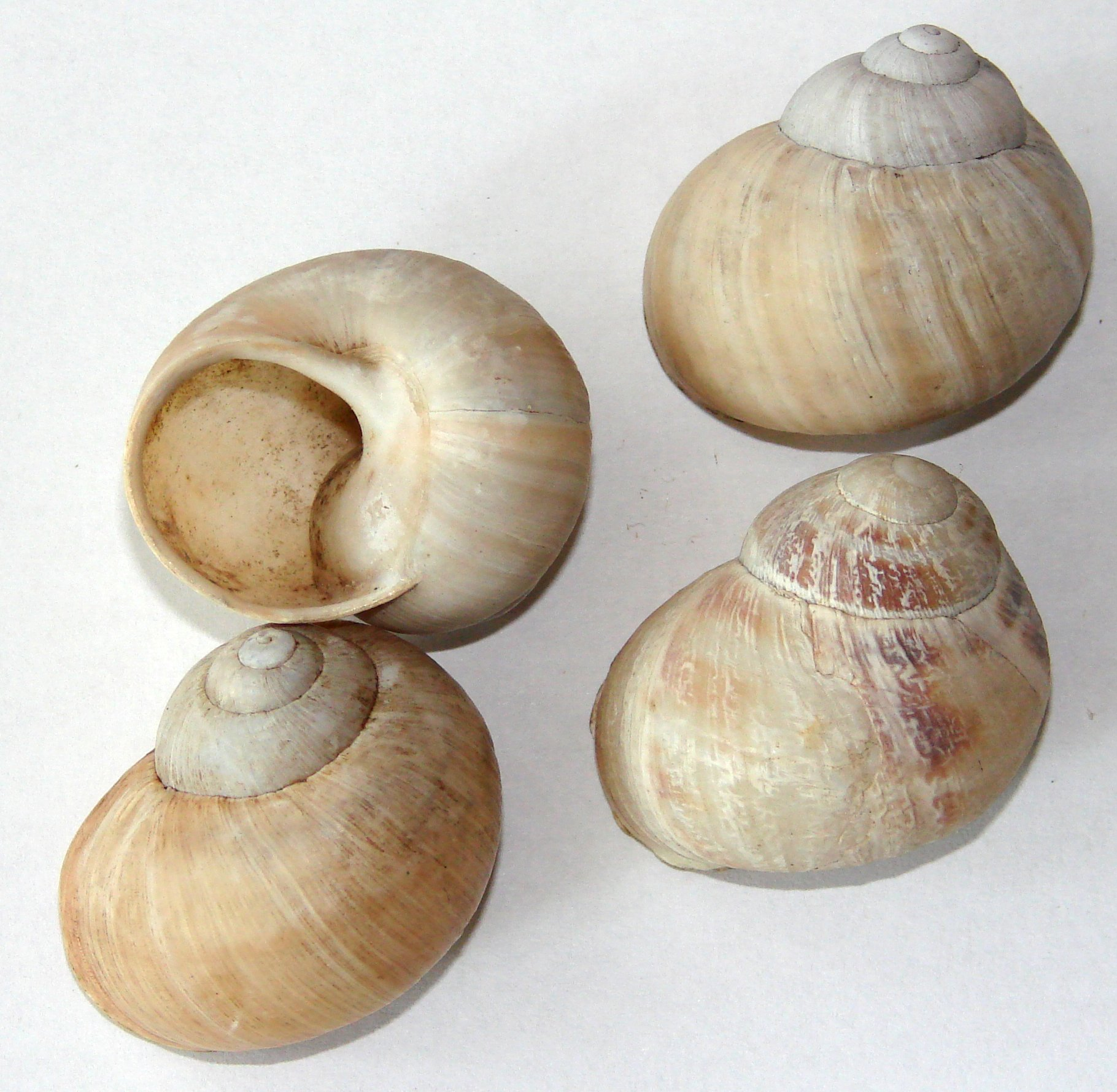
- Four shells of Helix lutescens

Scientific classification
- Kingdom: Animalia
- Phylum: Mollusca
- Class: Gastropoda
- Order: Stylommatophora
- Family: Helicidae
- Subfamily: Helicinae
- Tribe: Helicini
- Genus: Helix
- Species: H. lutescens

Binomial name
- Helix lutescens Linnaeus, 1758

Synonyms
- Helix (Helix) lutescens Rossmässler, 1837· accepted, alternate representation

= Helix lutescens =

Species of gastropod

Helix lutescens is species of air-breathing land snail, a terrestrial pulmonate gastropod mollusk in the family Helicidae, the true snails.

This species of snail creates and uses calcareous love darts.

== Distribution ==
Its native distribution is pericarpathian.

- Poland - Near Threatened (NT, mentioned as lower risk LR)
- Slovakia
- Ukraine
