= Lindholmia =

Scientific classification
- Kingdom: Animalia
- Phylum: Mollusca
- Class: Gastropoda
- Order: Stylommatophora
- Family: Helicidae
- Tribe: Helicini
- Genus: Lindholmia; P.Hesse, 1918

Genus of snails

Lindholmia is a genus of large terrestrial pulmonate gastropod mollusks in the family Helicidae, the typical snails. It has two known species distributed in northwestern Turkey and southern Georgia. The shell is globular, with narrow dark bands.

== Species ==
- Lindholmia nordmanni (Mousson, 1854)
- Lindholmia christophi Boettger, 1881
