= Helix godetiana =

Conservation status
- Endangered (IUCN 3.1)

Scientific classification
- Kingdom: Animalia
- Phylum: Mollusca
- Class: Gastropoda
- Order: Stylommatophora
- Family: Helicidae
- Genus: Helix
- Species: H. godetiana

Binomial name
- Helix godetiana Kobelt, 1878

Species of gastropod

Helix godetiana is a species of large, air-breathing land snail, a terrestrial pulmonate gastropod mollusc in the family Helicidae, the typical snails. This species is endemic to Greece.
