= Aristena =

Conservation status
- Critically Endangered (IUCN 3.1)

Scientific classification
- Kingdom: Animalia
- Phylum: Mollusca
- Class: Gastropoda
- Order: Stylommatophora
- Family: Helicidae
- Tribe: Helicini
- Genus: Aristena; Psonis, Vardinoyannis & Poulakakis, 2022
- Species: A. rechingeri

Binomial name
- Aristena rechingeri (Fuchs & Käufel, 1936)
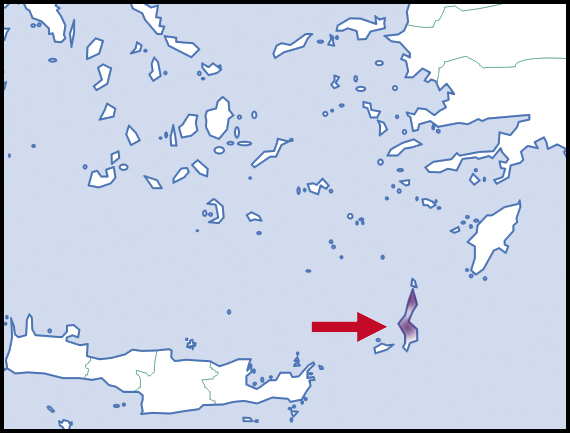
- Native range of the species

Synonyms
- Assyriella rechingeri (Fuchs & Käufel, 1936); Levantina (Levantina) rechingeri (A. Fuchs & Käufel, 1936) superseded combination; Levantina rechingeri A. Fuchs & Käufel, 1936 superseded combination

Genus of land snails

Aristena is a monotypic genus of terrestrial gastropods in the family Helicidae. The only species is Aristena rechingeri (Fuchs & Käufel, 1936). The genus was proposed following a molecular phylogenetic analysis.

The species is endemic to the island Karpathos, Greece. It is a very rare species, without published observations of live individuals.

It was originally described as Levantina rechingeri.
