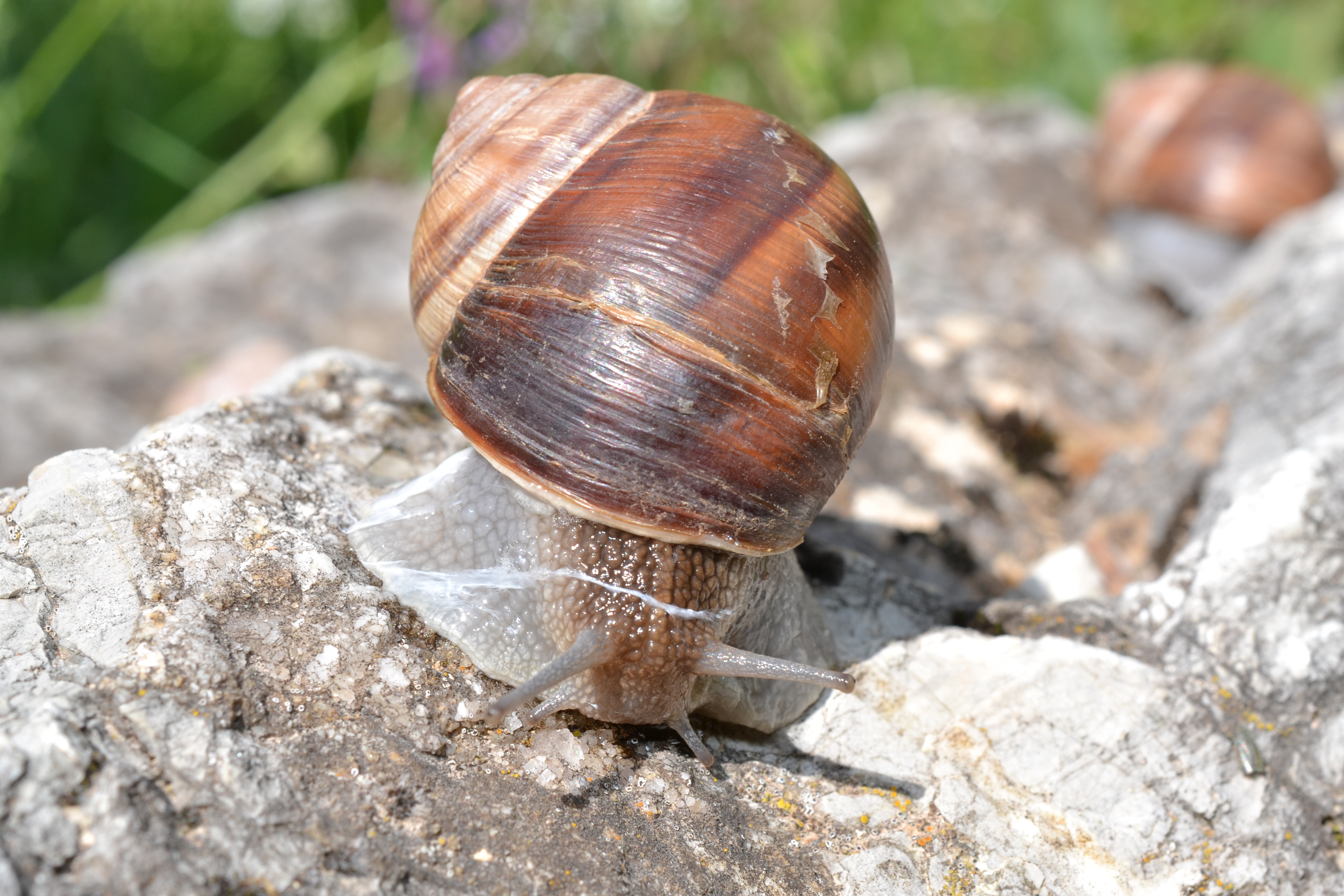

Conservation status
- Data Deficient (IUCN 3.1)

Scientific classification
- Kingdom: Animalia
- Phylum: Mollusca
- Class: Gastropoda
- Order: Stylommatophora
- Family: Helicidae
- Genus: Helix
- Species: H. borealis

Binomial name
- Helix borealis Mousson, 1859

= Helix borealis =

Land snail species

Helix borealis is a species of large, air-breathing land snail native to Greece and the south-west of Anatolia. It is characterized by brown to dark brown margins of the shell aperture. For decades, the species has been considered synonymous with Helix cincta.
