= Helix pronuba =

Scientific classification
- Kingdom: Animalia
- Phylum: Mollusca
- Class: Gastropoda
- Order: Stylommatophora
- Family: Helicidae
- Subfamily: Helicinae
- Tribe: Helicini
- Genus: Helix
- Species: H. pronuba

Binomial name
- Helix pronuba Westerlund & Blanc, 1879

Synonyms
- Helix (Helicogena) grothei Kobelt, 1905 (junior synonym); Helix (Helicogena) rueppelli Kobelt, 1904 (junior synonym); Helix (Helix) pronuba Westerlund, 1879 · alternate representation; Helix thiesseana var. nupta Westerlund, 1879 (junior synonym); Helix thiesseana var. pronuba Westerlund, 1879 (basionym)

Species of land snail

Helix pronuba is a species of large, air-breathing land snail in the subfamily Helicinae of the family Helicidae.

== Distribution ==
It is native to Tunisia, Libya and Egypt and introduced to Crete and Greece.

== Description ==
It is characterized by a shell relatively small for the genus with dark brown margins of the shell aperture. In the local language of Crete these snails are sometimes called "barbarésos" or "bárbaros", which might suggest their origin in Barbaria (North Africa).
