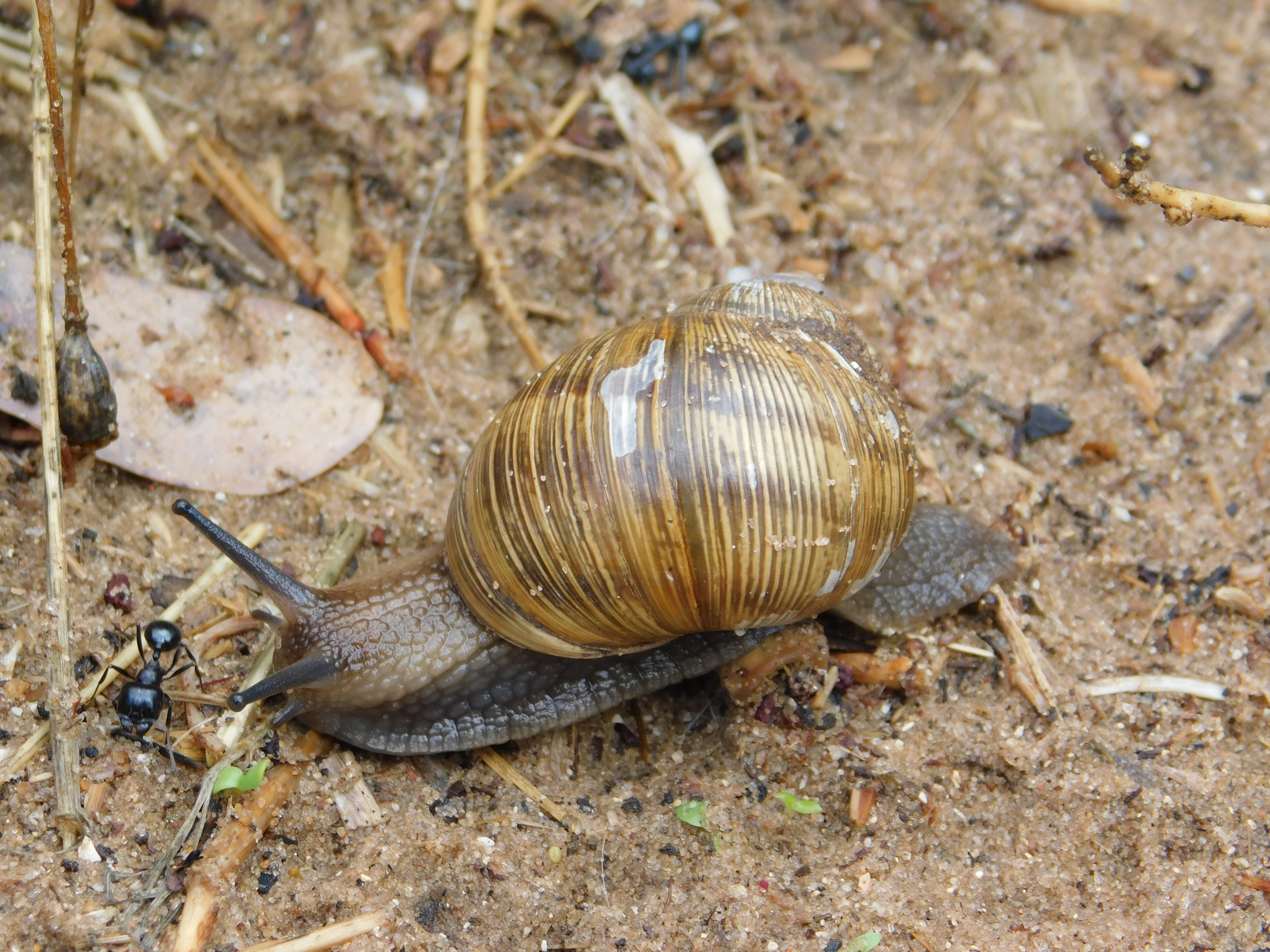

Scientific classification
- Kingdom: Animalia
- Phylum: Mollusca
- Class: Gastropoda
- Order: Stylommatophora
- Family: Helicidae
- Genus: Helix
- Species: H. engaddensis

Binomial name
- Helix engaddensis (Bourguignat, J. R. 1852)

= Helix engaddensis =

Species of gastropod

Helix engaddensis is a species of snail common in the Levant, both in Mediterranean, desert and montane climates. It is smaller than the closely related European Garden snail and usually lighter in color. H. engaddensis goes through estivation. It is dormant in the ground during the dry season and emerges after the first rains (in late autumn). Mating takes place soon after emerging. The snails are active through winter (except in high montane regions, where they might be forced into a somewhat unnatural hibernation) and return to an inactive state at the end of the wet season (midspring).

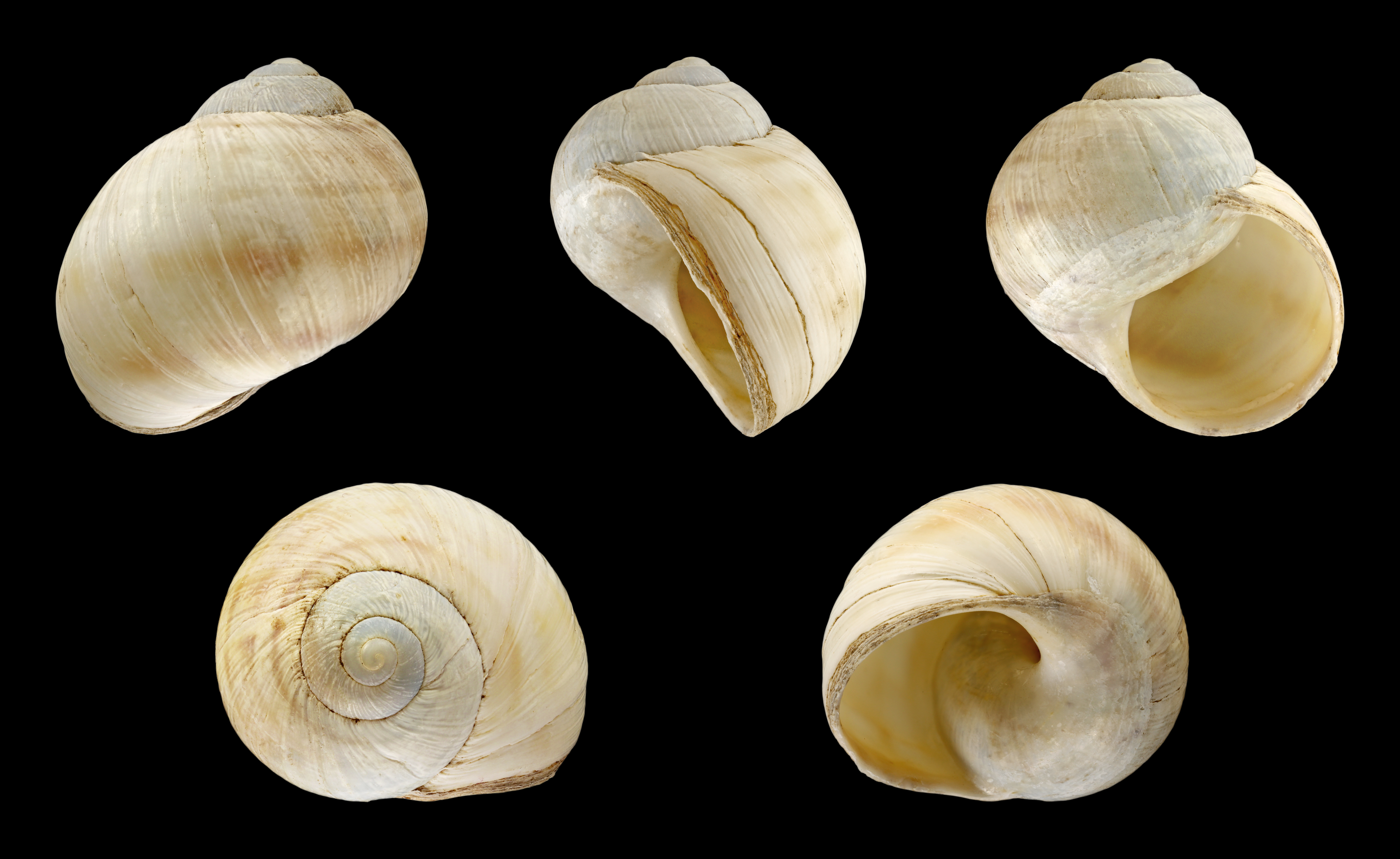
Detailed view of the shell of Helix engaddensis
