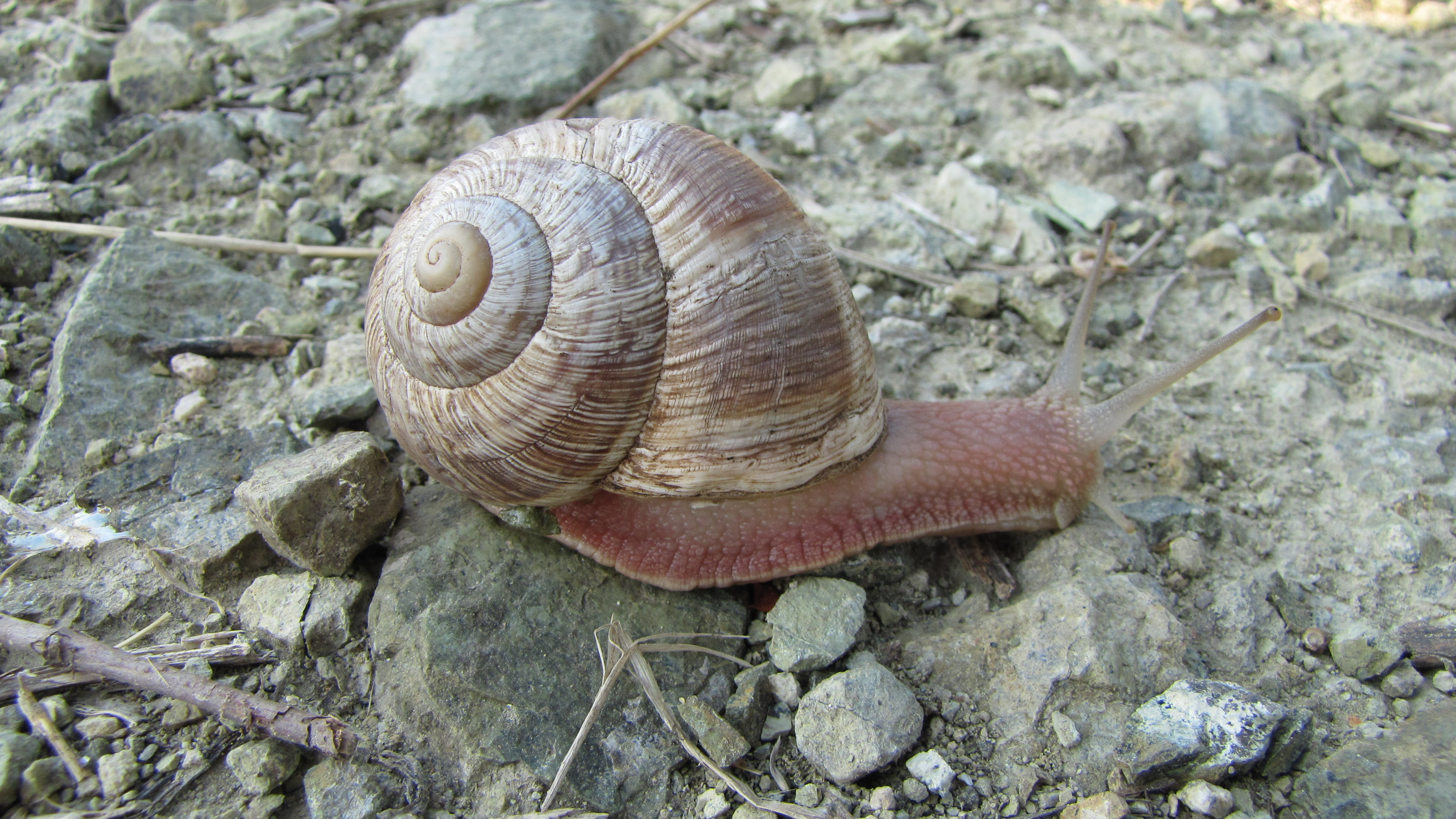

Scientific classification
- Kingdom: Animalia
- Phylum: Mollusca
- Class: Gastropoda
- Order: Stylommatophora
- Family: Helicidae
- Genus: Helix
- Species: H. asemnis

Binomial name
- Helix asemnis Bourguignat, 1860

Synonyms
- Helix adanensis Kobelt, 1896

= Helix asemnis =

Species of mollusc

Helix asemnis is a species of gastropods belonging to the family Helicidae.

The species is found in the Mediterranean.
