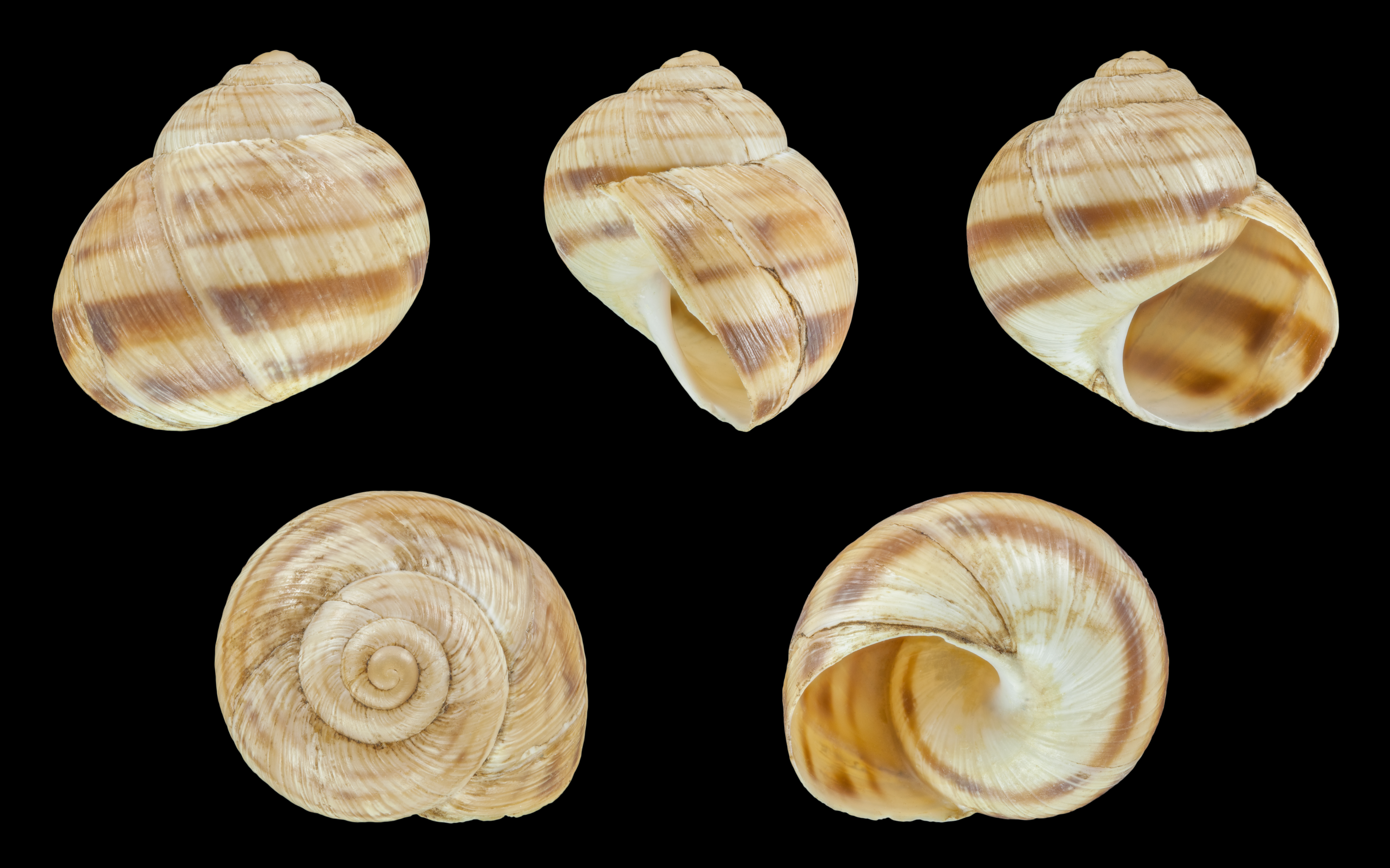

Conservation status
- Least Concern (IUCN 3.1)

Scientific classification
- Kingdom: Animalia
- Phylum: Mollusca
- Class: Gastropoda
- Order: Stylommatophora
- Family: Helicidae
- Genus: Helix
- Subgenus: Pelasga
- Species: H. figulina

Binomial name
- Helix figulina Rossmässler, 1839

= Helix figulina =

Species of gastropod

Helix figulina is a species of air-breathing land snail, a terrestrial pulmonate gastropod mollusk in the family Helicidae, the typical snails.

== Description ==
The shells of this species are dirty white to yellow-brownish in color, usually 21-27×20-26 mm in size. Large shells are about 29-31×29-30 mm.

== Distribution ==
This species is present in Greece, Bulgaria and North Macedonia, except, perhaps, the island of Skyros in the Aegean Sea, where only empty shells of the species have been found, suggesting a recent extinction in the area. There have been reports of the species in western Turkey, however, it seems that these are actually Helix nucula, a related and similar species.

== Habitat ==
This land snail is found in a variety of habitats including dry, open, shrub-land areas. It ranges from coastal areas (dunes) up to 700 m (2,300 ft) above sea level. On the continent, it lives only in areas where there is enough soil, as it is a soil-dwelling species, and sometimes buries deep into the soil. In southwest Bulgaria it lives at altitudes of up to 700 m (2,300 ft).
