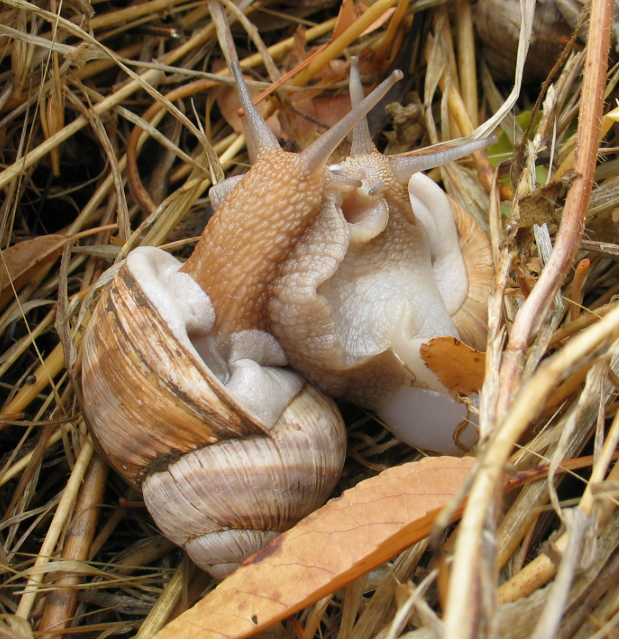

Scientific classification
- Kingdom: Animalia
- Phylum: Mollusca
- Class: Gastropoda
- Order: Stylommatophora
- Family: Helicidae
- Genus: Helix
- Species: H. pachya

Binomial name
- Helix pachya Bourguignat, 1860

Synonyms
- Helix texta Mousson, 1861

= Helix pachya =

Species of gastropod

Helix pachya (Hebrew: שבלול החרמון) is a species of large, edible, air-breathing land snail, a terrestrial pulmonate gastropod mollusk in the family Helicidae, the typical snails. This species is endemic to Israel. It lives in the high northern part of Israel, typically in the Hermon ridge area.

It is the largest Israeli snail with a shell of diameter 55 mm. It is active during autumn (which is November in Israel), when it eats and mates. When the cold winter comes the snail enter hibernation until the next autumn. This snail lives several years and mates usually only a year after hatching from the egg. The size of the egg is 5.5 mm.

Recent studies determined that Helix texta is a synonym of Helix pachya.
