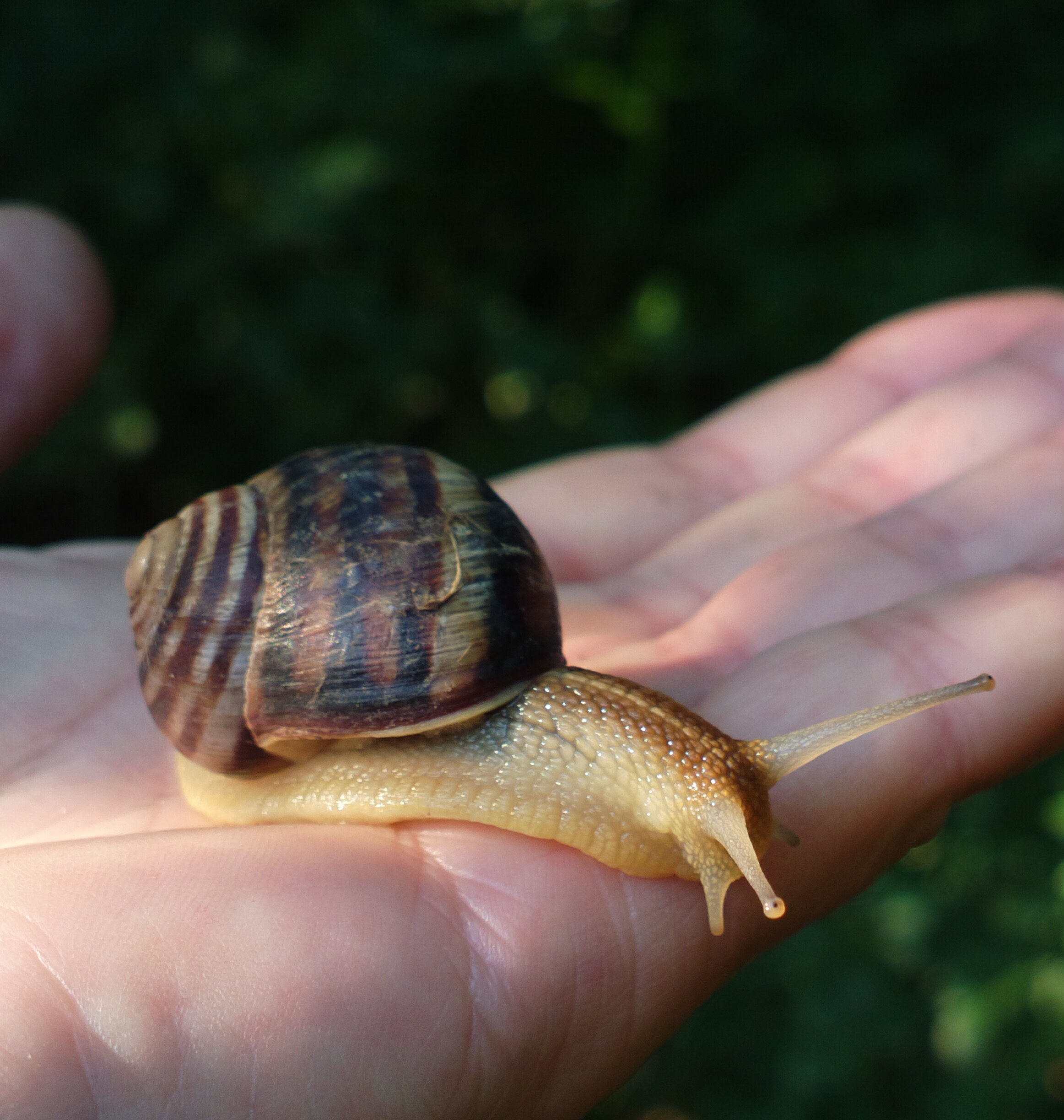

Conservation status
- Least Concern (IUCN 3.1)

Scientific classification
- Kingdom: Animalia
- Phylum: Mollusca
- Class: Gastropoda
- Order: Stylommatophora
- Family: Helicidae
- Genus: Helix
- Species: H. albescens

Binomial name
- Helix albescens Rossmässler, 1839

= Helix albescens =

Species of snail

Helix albescens is a species of large air-breathing land snail from eastern Europe belonging to the family Helicidae.

== Description ==
Helix albescens is a relatively small Helix species with globular shell, which is whitish to cream-brown, usually with five reddish-brown bands of which especially the second and third may partly fuse. Umbilicus closed, apertural margins may be brown. Characteristic is a very large protoconch (the embryonal shell). The animal is yellow, usually with a dark, brown back.

On the genital system, typical characters are a missing diverticulum of bursa copulatrix (gametolytic gland) and a very short flagellum.

== Distribution and habitat ==
Helix albescens is distributed in southern Ukraine, southwestern Russia (Ciscaucasia) and the Caucasus (Georgia, Armenia, Azerbaijan). The distribution of mitochondrial genetic lineages suggests that the species originates from Crimea.

The species naturally occurs in shrubby habitats (with Christ's thorn, blackthorn, hawthorn, etc.).

== Reproduction ==
As all stylommatophoran land snails, H. albescens is a hermaphrodite. It lays its eggs in small clutches in cavities dug 5-6 cm deep into a damp soil. Egg laying takes many hours, because laying one egg can takes as much as two hours. Recorded clutch size ranges between 6 and 25 eggs, with an average of 18 eggs. Oval eggs are large relative to the animal, with a maximum diameter of 6-11 mm.
