= Epiphragm =

Temporary barrier produced by snails

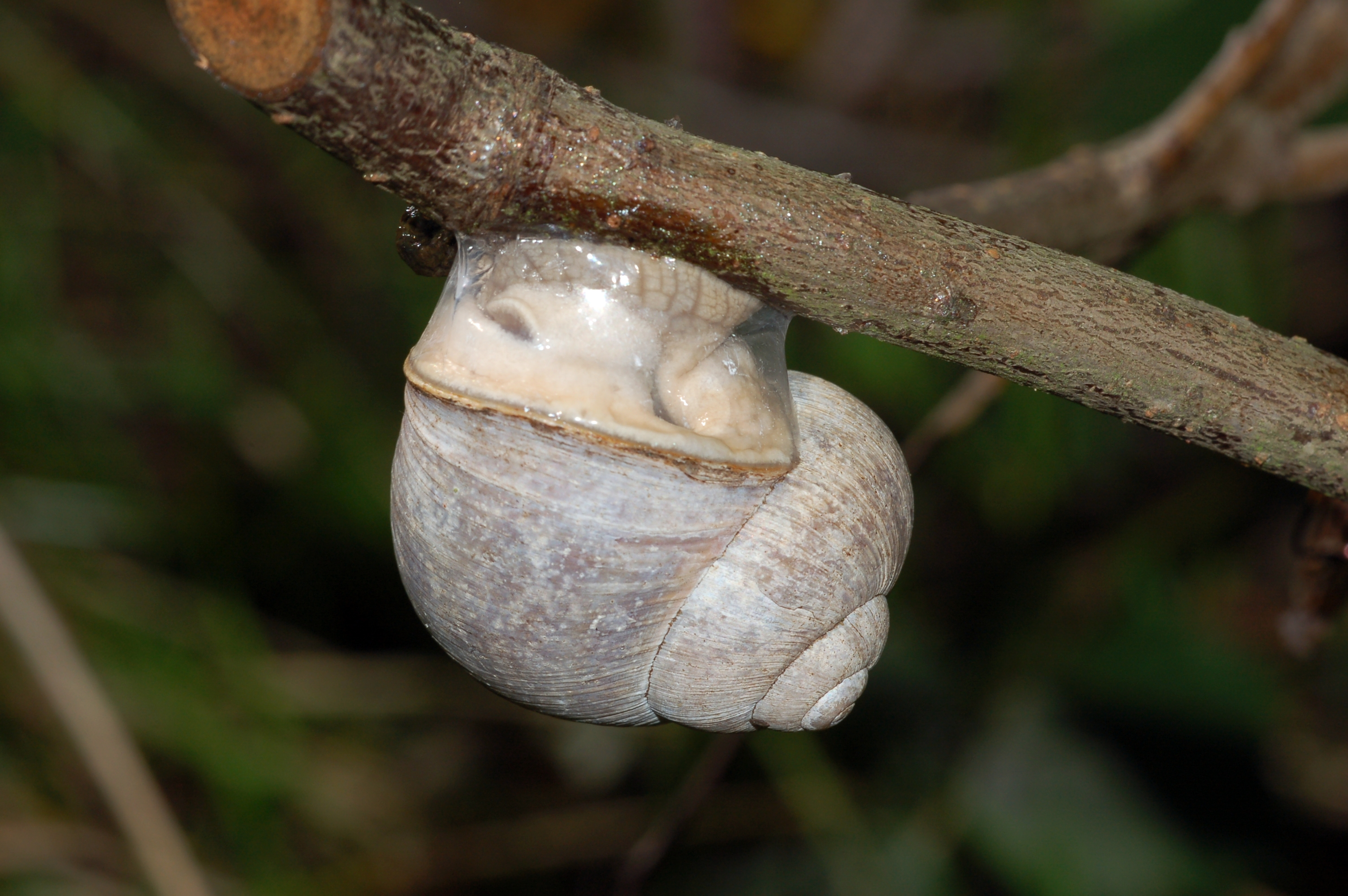
Helix pomatia using a simple transparent epiphragm made of dried mucus

An epiphragm (from the Ancient Greek ἐπί, epi " upon, on, over " and φράγμα, -phrágma "fence") is a temporary structure which can be created by many species of shelled, air-breathing land snails, terrestrial pulmonate gastropod mollusks. It can also be created by freshwater snails when temporary pools dry up.

In most species, the epiphragm is made of dried mucus, and although it is elastic, it is fairly easily torn when forcibly removing a snail from its substrate. In a few species, the epiphragm is thick and quite rigid, being reinforced with calcium carbonate. This kind of epiphragm is very strong and may be difficult to break.

== Function ==
The epiphragm is created to seal the aperture of the shell against desiccation. It is used when the snail is inactive. Most land snails are only active when the humidity is high such as after rain and at night, and become inactive during dry weather.

The main function of the epiphragm is to reduce water loss through the aperture during inactivity.

An operculum is a somewhat similar but permanent anatomical feature that is found in other clades of gastropods. The operculum serves some of the same functions as an epiphragm.

Sometimes it protects the snail against predation. It protects certain species of snail if they are eaten by birds (such as Japanese white-eye). The snail can remain alive as it passes through the digestive tract because it is protected from the digestive enzymes. Snails may also benefit from being moved to new locations.

== Mucus epiphragm ==
In most species of air-breathing land snail, the epiphragm is a simple membrane composed of layers of dried mucus. This is created routinely at the start of a period of inactivity during times of decreased humidity. The epiphragm of Cornu aspersum is secreted from the mantle collar of the snail by intense muscular activity.

This simple mucus epiphragm covers the entire aperture of the snail, being attached at the rim of the aperture, and depending on the habits of the species of snail, is very often also glued to a solid substrate, such as a rock surface, a wall, a tree branch or the stem of a plant, reducing water loss from the soft tissues of the snail's body. A mucus epiphragm is usually transparent or translucent, and is fairly elastic.

== Calcareous epiphragm ==
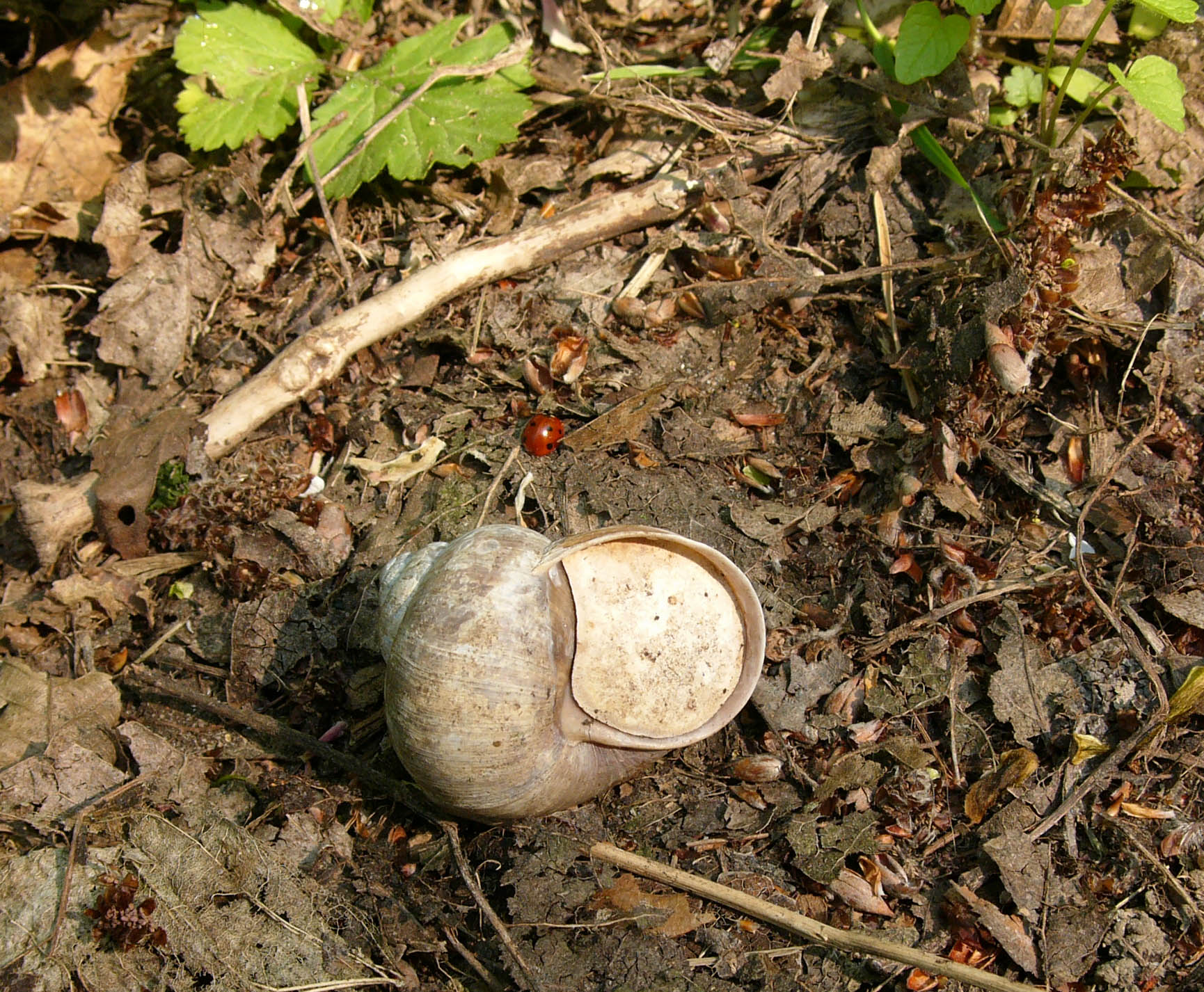
A hibernating Helix pomatia with a calcareous epiphragm in place

A few species, including Helix pomatia create a normal mucus epiphragm for short periods of rest, but can also create a different, specialized solid hard epiphragm, prior to annual hibernation. This kind of epiphragm is a solid structure composed mainly of calcium carbonate, and is much more effective at preventing water loss than a thin mucus epiphragm would be.

This very sturdy flat calcareous structure has a small perforation to allow for oxygen exchange. Helix pomatia snails hibernate for many months buried in the soil, and a strong solid epiphragm protects them not only from desiccation, but also against attacks by soil-dwelling predators such as carnivorous beetle larvae.

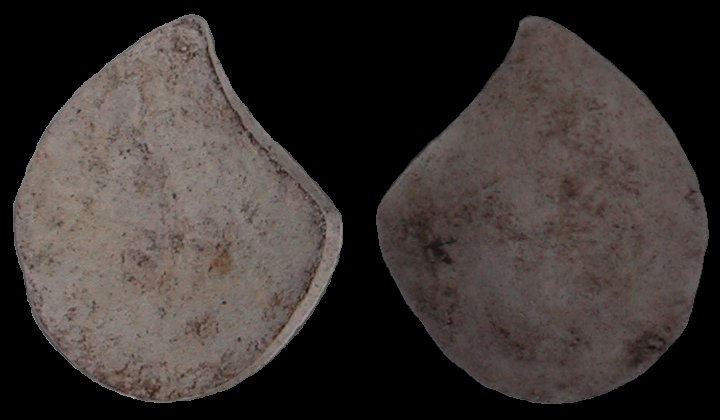
The calcareous epiphragm of Helix pomatia: view of the inner surface, left, and the outer surface, right

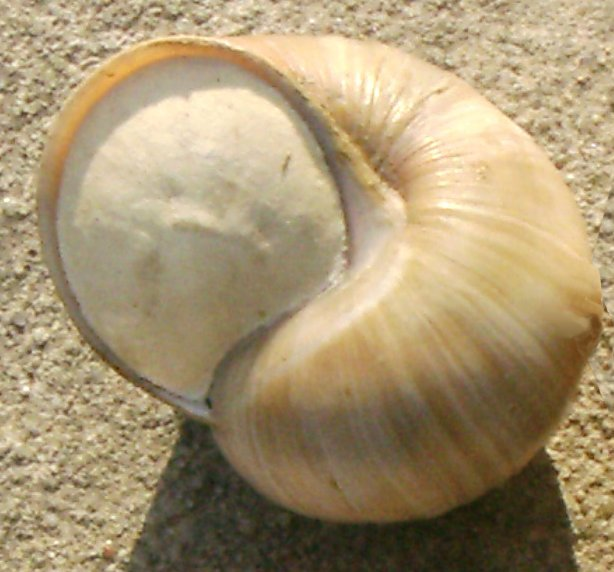
Helix lutescens with a calcareous epiphragm in place
