= Paul Hesse =

Paul Hesse (3 February 1857 – 26 February 1938) was a German zoologist, who specialised in the study of Mollusca. In 1926, the Academy of Natural Sciences of Pennsylvania purchased a collection of about 50,000 specimens from Hesse, mainly focusing on non-marine molluscs from Europe.

== Works ==
Hesse's works included:

- Hesse, P., 1898: Die Perlfischerei im Roten Meere. Zoologische Garten, 39: 382-385
- Hesse, P., 1911: Nekrolog. Carl Agardh Westerlund, (1831-1908) Nachrichtsblatt der Deutschen Malakozoologischen Gesellschaft, 43: 167-171.
- Hesse, P., 1917: Mollusken von Varna und Umgebung, Nachrichtsblatt der Deutschen Malakozoologischen Gesellschaft
- Hesse, P., 1918: Die systematische Stellung von Pyramidula rupestris Drap., nebst Bemerkungen über einige verwandte Genera.Nachrichtsblattder Deutschen Malakozoologischen Gesellschaft, 5(1): 110-120.
- Hesse, P., 1925: On the anatomy of some Clausiliidae. Proceedings of the Malacological Society of London 16 (4): 154-162.
- Hesse, P., 1926: Die Nacktschnecken der palearktischen Region. Abhandlungen des Archiv für Molluskenkunde 2(1): 1-152.

== Other sources ==
- Deutsche Biographie
- 1939 Paul Hesse’s Schriften. Archiv für Molluskenkunde, 71 (1): 52-55.
