= Helicini =

- Caucasotachea atrolabiata

Scientific classification
- Kingdom: Animalia
- Phylum: Mollusca
- Class: Gastropoda
- Order: Stylommatophora
- Family: Helicidae
- Subfamily: Helicinae
- Tribe: Helicini; Rafinesque, 1815

Type genus
- Helix Linnaeus, 1758

Genera
- Amanica H. Nordsieck, 2017; Aristena Psonis, Vardinoyannis & Poulakakis, 2022; Caucasotachea C. R. Boettger, 1909; Codringtonia Kobelt, 1898; Helix Linnaeus, 1758; Isaurica Kobelt, 1901; Levantina Kobelt, 1871; Lindholmia P. Hesse, 1918; Maltzanella P. Hesse, 1917; Neocrassa Subai, 2005

Tribe of molluscs

Helicini is a tribe of terrestrial gastropods in the family Helicidae. It contains mostly large land snail species, diversified in particular in the Balkans, Anatolia, and the Caucasus.

The tribe as currently accepted was delimited with molecular phylogenetic analyses. The previously used concept was much broader and included what now constitutes the subfamily Helicinae, but without Theba. In its present sense, the tribe constitutes the eastern clade of Helicinae, in contrast to the primarily North African Otalini and Allognathini from the western Europe and Macaronesia. There is no known synapomorphy.
