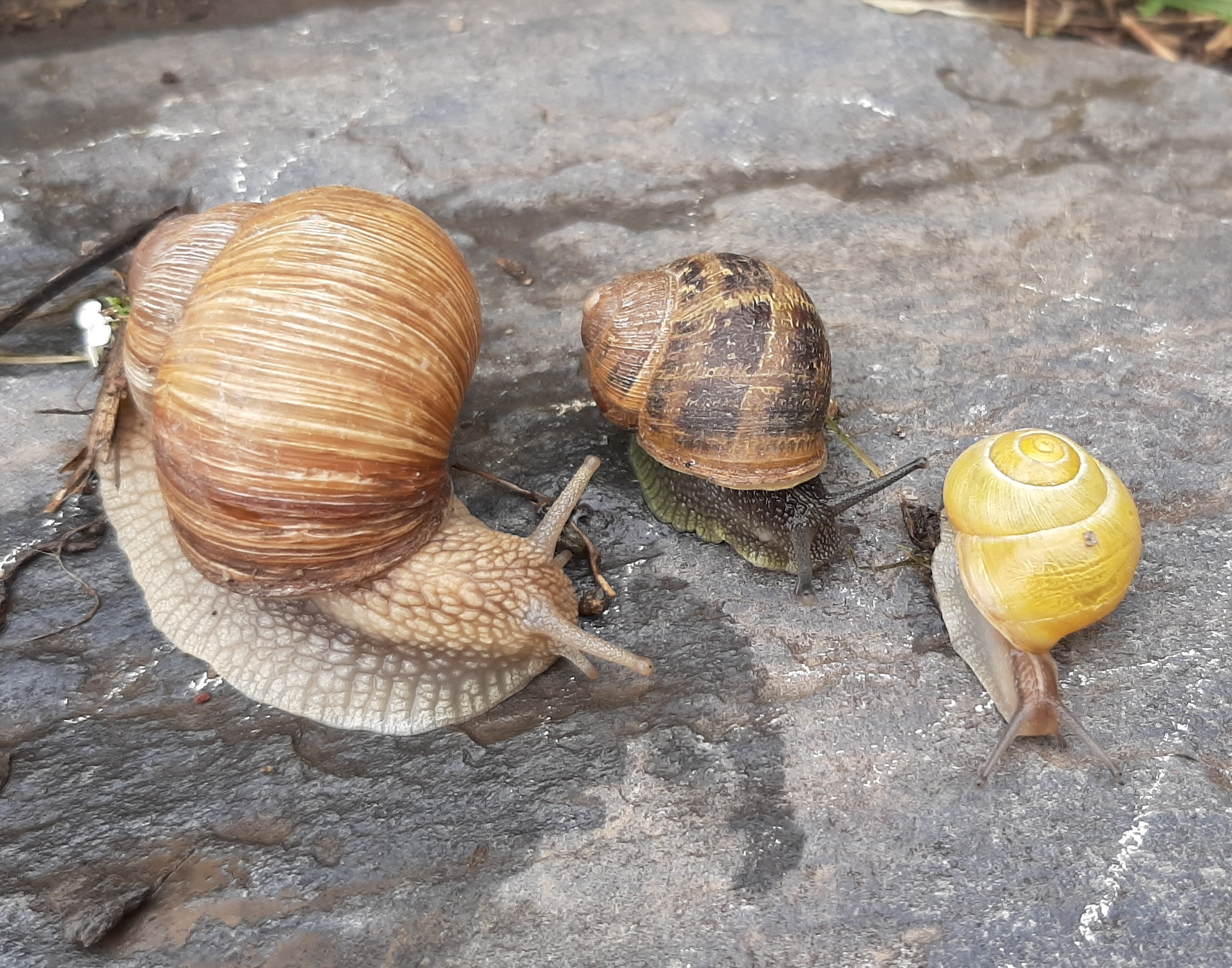
- From left to right: Roman snail (Helix pomatia), Garden snail (Cornu aspersum) and White-lipped snail (Cepaea hortensis), three species of Helicinae

Scientific classification
- Kingdom: Animalia
- Phylum: Mollusca
- Class: Gastropoda
- Order: Stylommatophora
- Family: Helicidae
- Subfamily: Helicinae; Rafinesque, 1815

Type genus
- Helix Linnaeus, 1758

Tribes
- Helicini; Allognathini; Maculariini; Thebini

= Helicinae =

Subfamily of land snails

Helicinae is a subfamily of terrestrial gastropods in the family Helicidae. It contains mostly large land snail species, distributed in the western Palaearctic. The most recent (as of 2023) classification proposed division into three tribes.

The subfamily contains the largest helicids, and includes widely known, widespread species like the garden snail, grove snail, white garden snail, chocolate-band snail or the Roman snail.

Caucasotachea atrolabiata

== See also ==
- Taxonomy of the Helicidae
