= Philip Rogers =

Philip Rogers may refer to:

- Sir Philip Rogers (businessman) (1908–1994), British businessman closely associated with Nigeria and Kenya
- Philip Hutchins Rogers (1794–1853), English marine and landscape painter
- Phil Rogers (born 1971), swimmer
- Phil Rogers (potter) (born 1951), Welsh studio potter
- Phil Rodgers (1938–2018), American golfer
- Philip Rogers (sailor) (1908–1961), Canadian Olympian
- Sir Philip Rogers (civil servant), English civil servant
