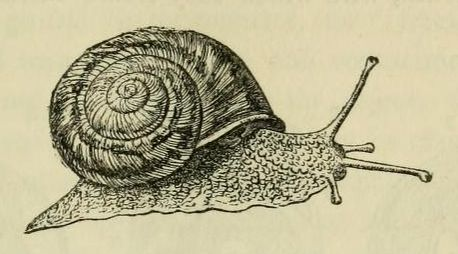
- Eremina desertorum (Woodcut, after a drawing by A. N. Waterhouse, from page 7 of the book 'A Manual of the Mollusca' (1851), by Samuel Pickworth Woodward.

Scientific classification
- Kingdom: Animalia
- Phylum: Mollusca
- Class: Gastropoda
- Order: Stylommatophora
- Family: Helicidae
- Subfamily: Helicinae
- Tribe: Thebini
- Genus: Eremina; L. Pfeiffer, 1885

Type species
- Helix desertorum Forskål, 1775

Synonyms
- Erinna Mörch, 1865; Eremophila Kobelt, 1871; Eremiopsis C.R. Boettger, 1909; Hessea C.R. Boettger, 1911; Nomma Pallary, 1924; Exiliberus Iredale, 1942

= Eremina =

Genus of gastropods

Eremina is a genus of land snails.

Species include:

- Eremina desertorum (Forskål, 1775)
- Eremina ehrenbergi (Roth, 1839)
