= Matilda Heming =

British painter

- Study of Matilda Lowry (later Heming) standing at a sketching table by John Flaxman, 1803
- Born: Matilda Lowry; 1796; London, United Kingdom
- Died: 1855 (aged 58–59)
- Known for: Watercolor; Landscape art

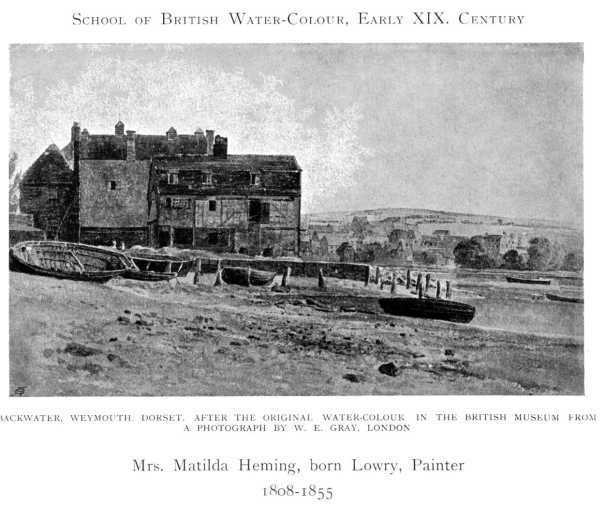
Backwater, Weymouth, Dorset

Matilda Heming, née Lowry (1796–1855) was a British watercolourist.

== Biography ==
Heming was born in London, England. She was the daughter of Wilson Lowry. The engraver Joseph Wilson Lowry was her younger half-brother. She is known for watercolour portraits, but her landscape watercolour Backwater, Weymouth, was included in the 1905 book Women Painters of the World. Today it is in the collection of the British Museum, along with a few more landscapes and a portrait she made of the writer Mary Somerville.
