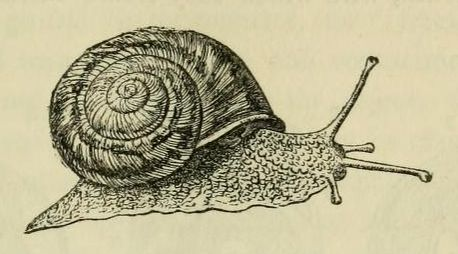
- The revived British Museum specimen (Woodcut, after a drawing by A. N. Waterhouse, from page 7 of the book 'A Manual of the Mollusca' (1851), by Samuel Pickworth Woodward.

Scientific classification
- Kingdom: Animalia
- Phylum: Mollusca
- Class: Gastropoda
- Order: Stylommatophora
- Family: Helicidae
- Genus: Eremina
- Species: E. desertorum

Binomial name
- Eremina desertorum (Forskål, 1775)

Synonyms
- Helix desertorum Forskål, 1775

= Eremina desertorum =

Species of gastropod

Eremina desertorum (formerly Helix desertorum) is a species of land snails in the genus Eremina. It is native to desert regions in Egypt and Israel.

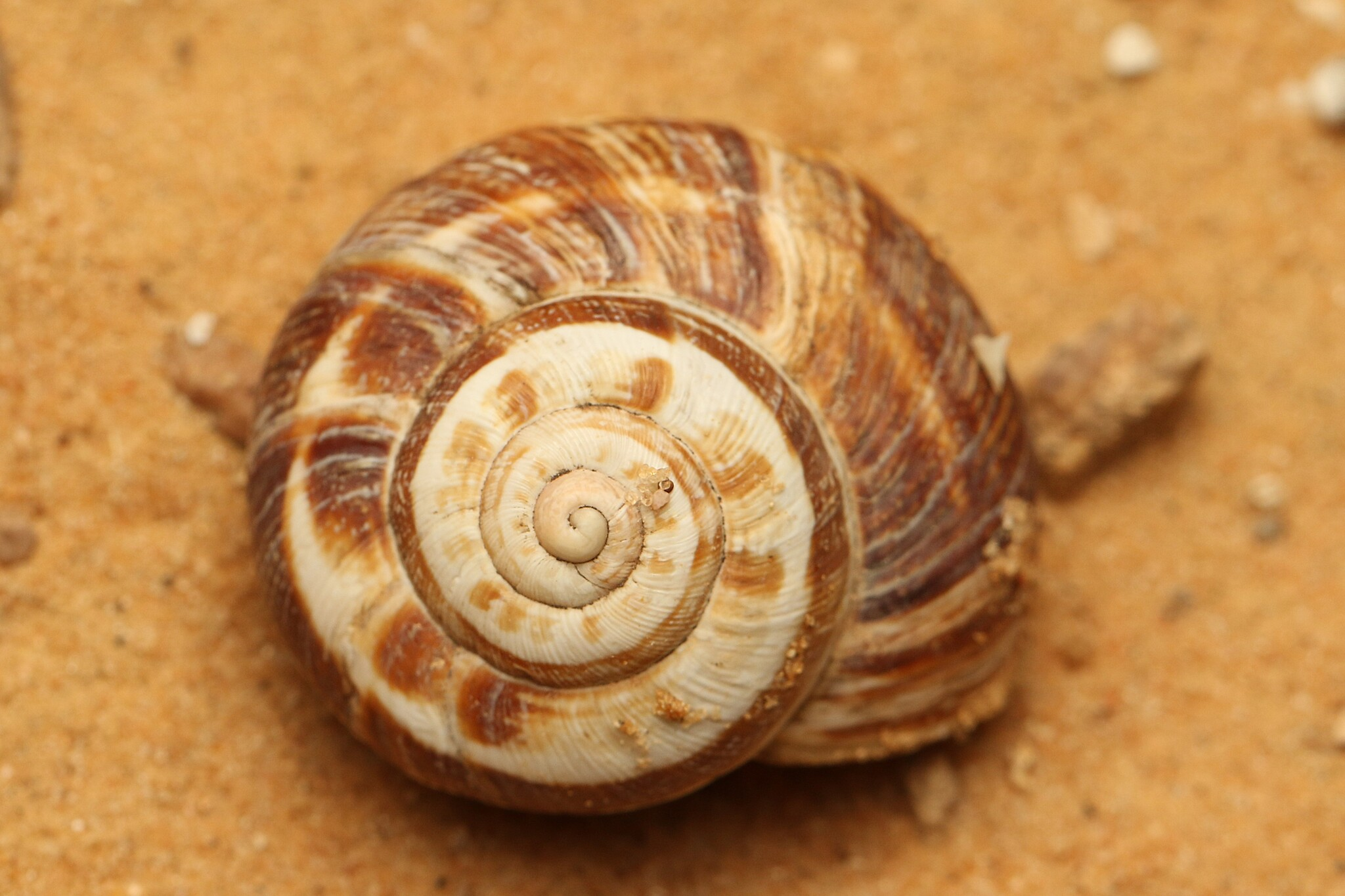
From Israel

A specimen from Egypt, initially thought to be dead, was glued to an index card at the British Museum in March 1846. However, in March 1850, it was discovered to be alive. The Canadian writer Grant Allen observed:

The Museum authorities accordingly ordered our friend a warm bath (who shall say hereafter that science is unfeeling!), upon which the grateful snail, waking up at the touch of the familiar moisture, put his head cautiously out of his shell, walked up to the top of the basin, and began to take a cursory survey of British institutions with his four eye-bearing tentacles. So strange a recovery from a long torpid condition, only equalled by that of the Seven Sleepers of Ephesus, deserved an exceptional amount of scientific recognition.

It is reported that the museum specimen was then transferred to a large glass jar where it lived for a further two years, subsisting largely on cabbage leaves. During this period, it successfully re-entered and exited torpor once more.

Later studies demonstrated that the species could survive in suspended animation without food or water for even longer. In 1904, 40 snails were placed in a tin box as part of an experiment. Approximately 8 years later, in 1912, 10 of these snails were found to be still alive.
