= Philip Hutchins Rogers =

English painter (1794–1853)

Philip Hutchins Rogers (1794–1853) was an English marine and landscape painter.

City of Salzburg, The Archbishops Palace on the Rock painted by Philip Hutchins Rogers in 1833

== Biography ==
Rogers was born at Plymouth in 1794, and educated at Plymouth Grammar School. He studied there under Dr. John Bidlake alongside Samuel Prout, Benjamin Haydon, and Charles Lock Eastlake. In the latter part of his life he resided on the Continent from motives of economy, and died at Lichtenthal, near Baden-Baden, June 25, 1853.

== Works ==
His works, some of which were close imitations of nature, were local views around Pymouyth, found a place in the collection at Saltram House. About 1813 he painted a large picture, The Bombardment of Algiers, which was engraved; and about 1820 some views on the Spanish coast. He was an occasional exhibitor at the Royal Academy up to 1835. Dartmoor (1826) by Noel Thomas Carrington had etched illustrations by Rogers.
