= Joseph Ellison Portlock =

British geologist (1794–1864)

Major-General Joseph Ellison Portlock FRS FGS
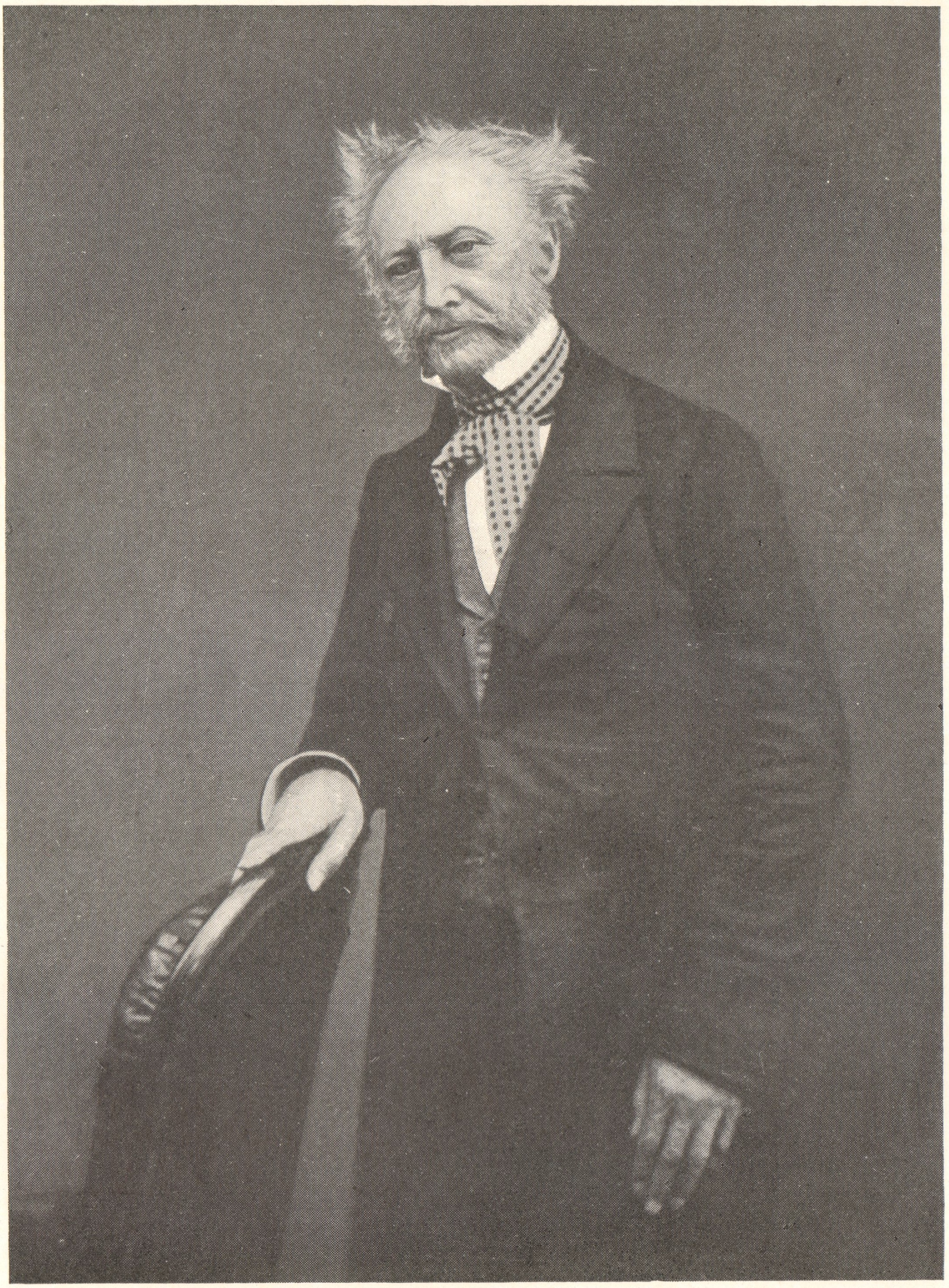
- Born: 30 September 1794; Gosport
- Died: 14 February 1864 (aged 69); Dublin
- Military career
- Allegiance: United Kingdom
- Branch: Ordnance Survey
- Service years: 1813–1857
- Rank: Major-General
- Conflicts: Siege of Fort-Erie, 1814
- Awards: Fellow of the Royal Society

Major-General Joseph Ellison Portlock (30 September 1794 – 14 February 1864) was born at Gosport and was a British geologist and British Army officer, the only son of Nathaniel Portlock, a captain in the Royal Navy.

Educated at Blundell's School and the Royal Military Academy, Portlock entered the Royal Engineers in 1813. In 1814, he took part in frontier operations in Canada. In 1824, he was selected by Lieut-colonel (afterwards Major-General) T.F. Colby (1784–1852) to take part in Ordnance Survey of Ireland. He was engaged for several years in the trigonometrical branch and subsequently compiled information on the physical aspects, geology, and economic products of Ireland, including the Memoir for which he wrote substantial sections on productive economy.

In 1837, he formed at Belfast a geological and statistical office, a museum for geological and zoological specimens, and a laboratory for the examination of soils. The work was then carried on by Portlock as the geological branch of the Ordnance Survey, and the chief results were embodied in his Report on the Geology of the County of Londonderry and of parts of Tyrone and Fermanagh (1843), an elaborate and well-illustrated volume in which he was assisted by Thomas Oldham.

After serving in Corfu and at Portsmouth, he was, in 1849, appointed Commanding Royal Engineer at Cork, and from 1851 to 1856, he was Inspector of Studies at the Royal Military Academy, Woolwich. For a short time, commanding officer at Dover, when the Council of Military Education was formed in 1857, he was selected as a member.

During these years of active service, he contributed numerous geological papers to the scientific societies of Dublin and to the British Association. He published, in 1848, a treatise on geology in John Weale's Rudimentary Series (3rd. ed., 1853). He was president of the geological section of the British Association at Belfast (1852) and of the Geological Society of London (1856–1858). He wrote a Memoir of the late Major-General Colby, with a Sketch of the Origin and Progress of the Trigonometrical Survey (reprinted in 1869 from Papers on Subjects connected with the Royal Engineers, vols. iii-v.). He also contributed several articles on military subjects to the 8th edition of the Encyclopaedia. He was elected a Fellow of the Royal Society in 1837. He died in Dublin on 14 February 1864.

He married twice: firstly Julia Browne at Kilmaine, Co Mayo, Ireland on 24 February 1831, and secondly to Fanny Turner at Cork, Ireland on 11 December 1849. Fanny was the 4th daughter of Major General Charles Turner, KH commander of the Cork District. There was no issue from either marriage.

== Bibliography ==
- Portlock, Joseph Ellison (1843). Report on the geology of the county of Londonderry, and of parts of Tyrone and Fermanagh. Ordnance Survey of Ireland.
- Portlock, Joseph Ellison (1849). A rudimentary treatise on geology. John Weale.
- Portlock, Joseph Ellison (1858). Papers on geometrical drawing: on the arms in use and permanent fortification, on the attack and defence of fortresses, on military mining and the defence of coasts. J. Weale.
- Portlock, Joseph Ellison (1869). Memoir of the life of Major-General Colby: R.E., LL.D., F.R.S.L. & E., F.R.A.S., F.G.S., M.R.I.A., etc: together with a sketch of the origin and progress of the ordnance survey of Great Britain and Ireland; a work with which General Colby was connected for forty-five years. Seeley, Jackson & Halliday.
