= Annie Waterhouse =

- Born: 1814
- Died: 24 October 1896 (aged 81–82)
- Known for: Illustration
- Spouse: James Frazer Redgrave

A. N. Waterhouse, also known as Annie Newman Waterhouse (c. 1814 – 24 October 1896) was an English illustrator, woodcutter, engraver, and teacher. She is best known for her illustrations in working with Joseph Wilson Lowry on Samuel Pickworth Woodward's A Manual of the Mollusca, which was published in three parts. The first part of A Manual of the Mollusca was published in 1851, and it was one of the most notable works on Mollusks that existed at that time. She was also a professor at Marlborough House, and taught classes on wood engraving for ladies only.

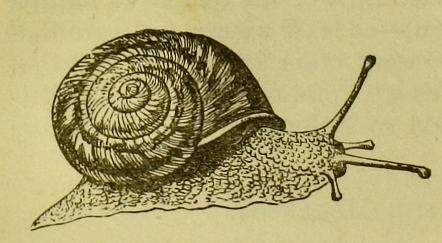
Woodcut of Snail from A Manual of the Mollusca.

== Early life ==
Annie Newman Waterhouse was born to Mary Newman and James Edward Waterhouse. She had three siblings, George Robert Waterhouse, Mary Theresa Waterhouse, and Frederick George Waterhouse. Both of her brothers were also involved in natural history and zoology.

== Marriage ==
She married James Frazer Redgrave in July 1856, but they had no children. James Frazer Redgrave was a clerk in the Office of Her Majesty's Woods, Forests and Land Revenues. He was eventually promoted to Principal Clerk.

== Woodcuts and teaching career ==
During her lifetime, Annie Waterhouse created many woodcuts, but her most notable works are in A Manual of the Mollusca. She produced the woodcuts for this work based on the drawings of mollusks by Samuel Pickworth Woodward, and then these were later engraved to create the book. She also created some embellishments for Sir Henry Cole's A Hand-Book for the Architecture, Tapestries, Paintings, Gardens, & Grounds of Hampton Court.

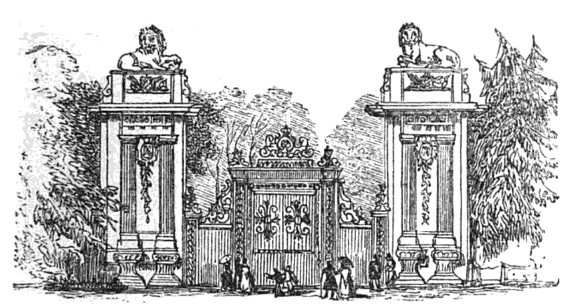
Wood-engraving of Lion Gates by A. N. Waterhouse

She began teaching wood engraving at Marlborough House around the same time that A Manual of the Mollusca was published. The woodcut of a snail as seen in this book is the living specimen of Helix desertorum that was in the British Museum at the time. In the essay "Seven Year Sleepers" by Grant Allen, the author misidentifies A. N. Waterhouse as "Mr. Waterhouse" when describing the story of the snail that woke up famous.

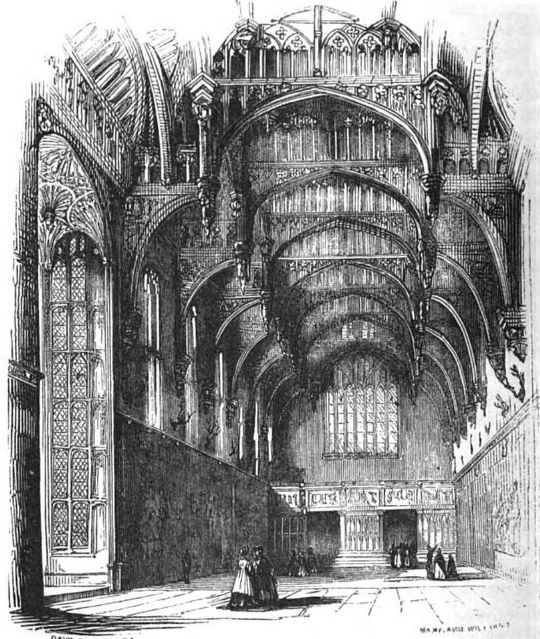
Engraving of hall by A. N. Waterhouse

It is possible that there are many woodcuts that were not expressly credited to her, as during this time and depending on the publisher, sometimes the name of the illustrator was not disclosed aside from in the financial records of the publisher, and female illustrators were credited even less commonly. She, as well as the students in her engraving class, produced work for the purpose of practice, as well as professional work to be used under the authority of the Department of Science and Art. They produced work to be used by the school at Marlborough House, as well as for patrons.
