= John Skinner Prout =

English painter (1805–1876)

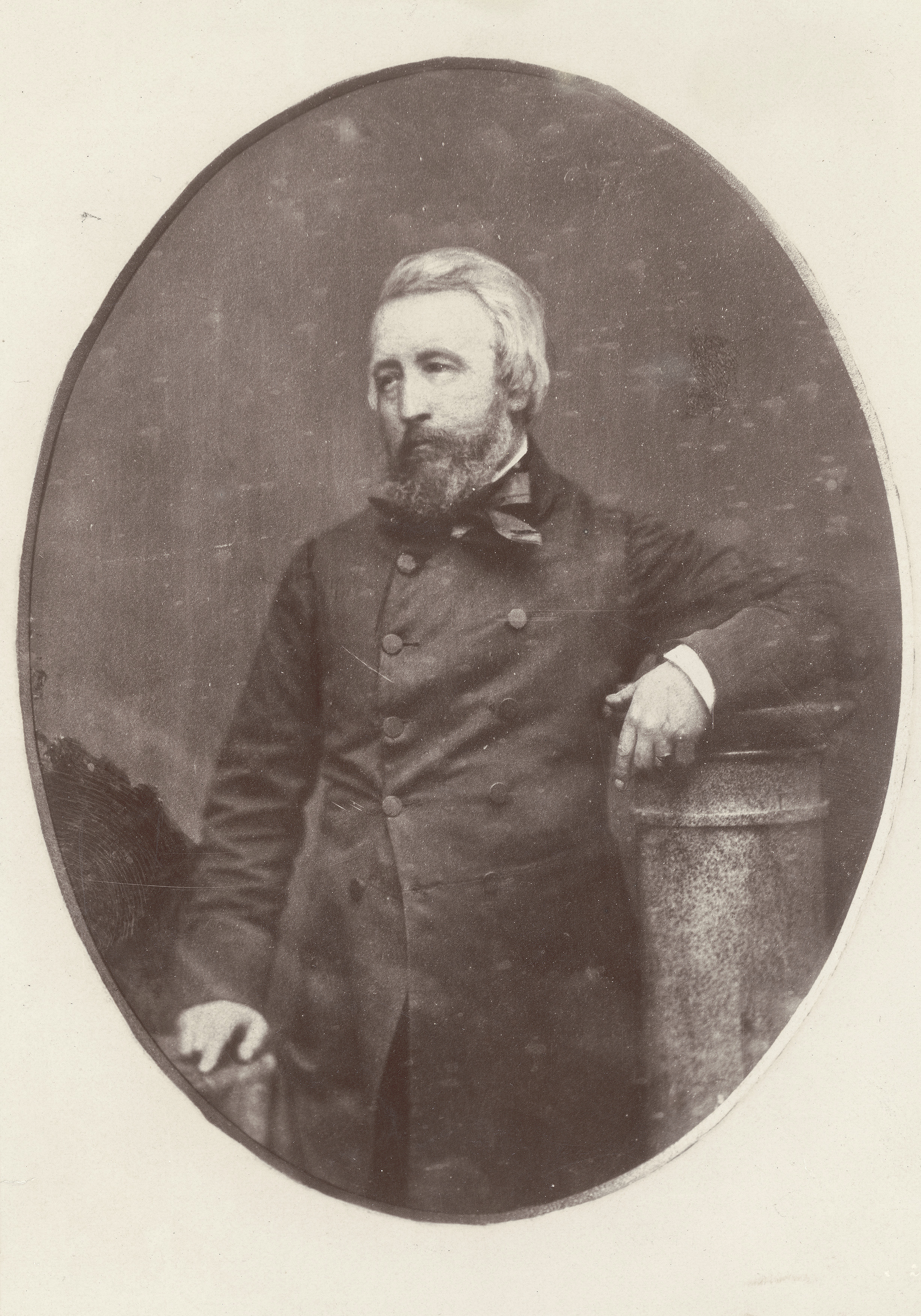
- Portrait of J. S. Prout, ca. 1860
- Born: John Skinner Prout; 19 December 1805; Devon, England
- Died: 29 August 1876 (aged 70); Kentish Town, London, England
- Resting place: Highgate Cemetery
- Education: Painter, Publisher
- Known for: Painting, lithography
- Notable work: 'Blue Mountain Scenery', 'Cockatoo Island, Sydney', 'Brady's Bay, Tasmania'
- Spouse: Maria Heathilla Marsh

John Skinner Prout (19 December 1805 – 29 August 1876) was a British painter, writer, lithographer and art teacher who worked in Australia in the 1840s.

== Biography ==
Skinner Prout was born on 19 December 1805 in Plymouth, Devon, England. He is the eldest child of John Prout and Maria Skinner. His father was the elder brother of watercolourist Samuel Prout.

Skinner Prout married Maria Heathilla, who was a musician and painter, on 19 June 1828. They had eleven children; six daughters (Matilda born in 1828, Anna Maria born in 1831, Rosa Heathilla born in 1833 and Agnes born in 1838, Mary Frederika and Amy) and five sons (Frederick born in 1834, Victor Albert born in 1835, Edwin born in 1837, Edgar born in 1839 and Mark).

On 3 December 1838, in London, Prout was elected a member of the New Society of Painters in water colours.

Hoping to improve his fortunes Prout emigrated to Australia with wife and eight children, arriving in Sydney 14 December 1840. Amongst the possessions that he brought with him to the colony of New South Wales was a lithographic press, which enabled him to set up the 'J. S. Prout and Co. Australian Lithographic Establishment.'

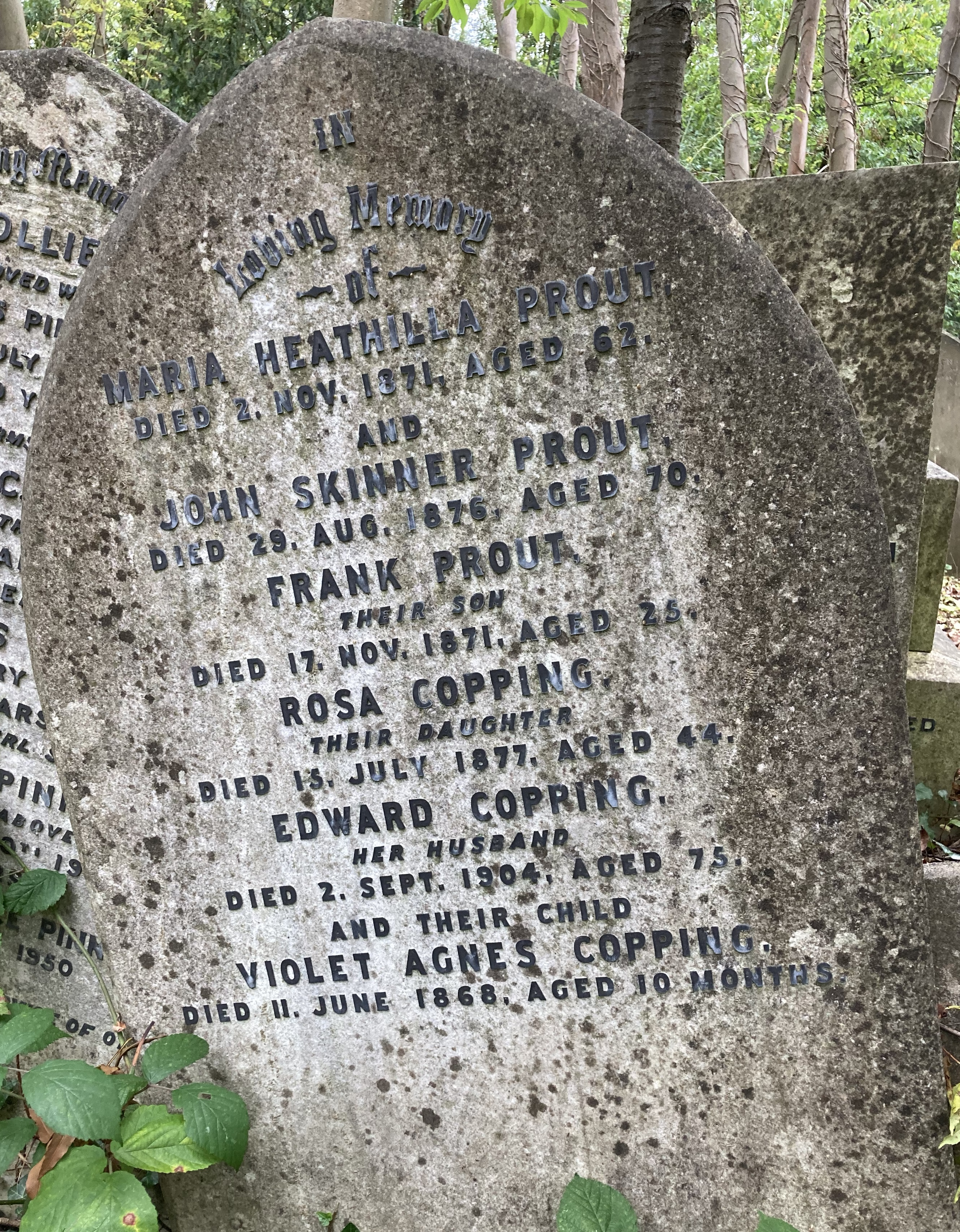
Family grave of John Skinner Prout in Highgate Cemetery

In the first four years of his residence in Sydney, between 1840 and 1844, Prout undertook a number of sketching tours in the districts around Sydney. Prout followed the route of many artists of the period, journeying west across the Blue Mountains towards Bathurst, south to Broulee and the Illawarra district, and north to Newcastle and Port Stephens. Returning from these travels, Prout would work up his sketches into finished works in lithographs, watercolour and oil paint for sale.

Whilst Prout was a resident in Sydney held exhibitions and presented lectures on the technique of drawing and painting in watercolour. His works original watercolours sold well and he produced a series of lithographic views of the colony, a number of which were in the 1842 publication Sydney illustrated.

Due to the lacklustre market for his works, competition by more established artists such as Conrad Martens, and the depressed economic circumstances of Sydney during the 1840s, Prout and his family moved once more. After a visit to the colony of Van Diemen's Land (Tasmania) in January he arrived with his family in April 1844. Here Prout was more successful, drawing the patronage of the Governor Sir John Franklin and his wife and held his first exhibition there in 1845.

Prout returned to England in June 1848, living in Bristol and London. Upon his return, at the Western Literary and Scientific Institution, Leicester Square, he exhibited his work on life in the Australian colonies, and lectured on convicts, bushrangers and Aboriginals. In the 1850s he produced illustrated handbooks detailing his travels in Australia. Among them An illustrated handbook of the voyage to Australia and a visit to the gold fields, 1852 and A Magical Trip to the Gold Regions, 1853. These publications have raised the question as the whether Prout returned to Australia, as he claimed the sketches for the illustrated volumes were made on site in 1852.

His grandson was the illustrator Harold Copping who married in 1888 his cousin Violet Amy Prout (1865–1894) daughter of son Victor Albert.

Prout died at Kentish Town, London, on 29 August 1876 and was buried in a family grave on the eastern side of Highgate Cemetery.

== Gallery ==
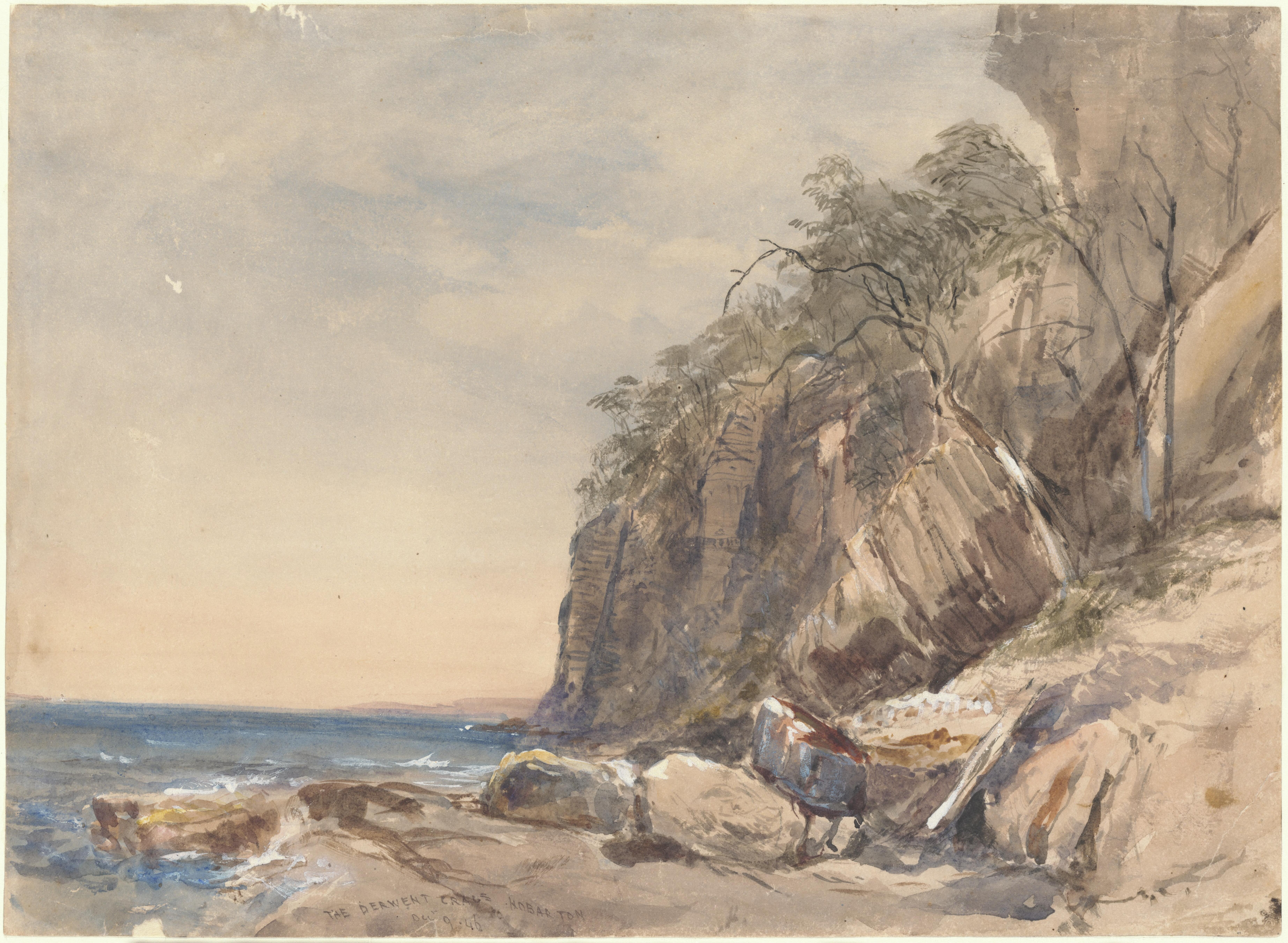
John Skinner Prout, The Derwent Crags, Hobarton, Decr.9, '46, 1846; watercolour; 24.4 x 33.4 cm. National Library of Australia

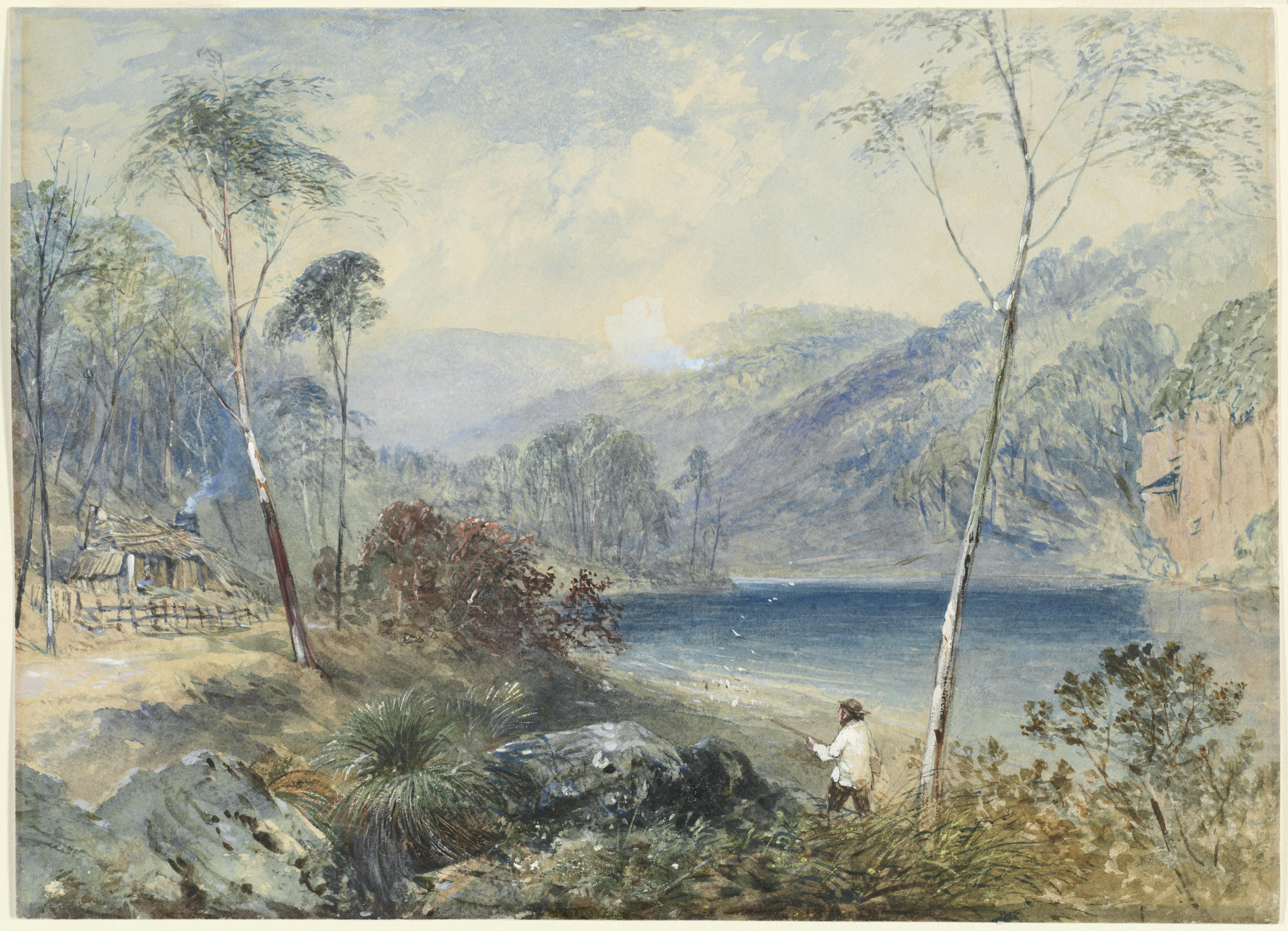
John Skinner Prout, Fairlight Glen on the Warragambra (i.e. Warragamba), c.1843, watercolour; 27 x 37.5 cm. National Library of Australia

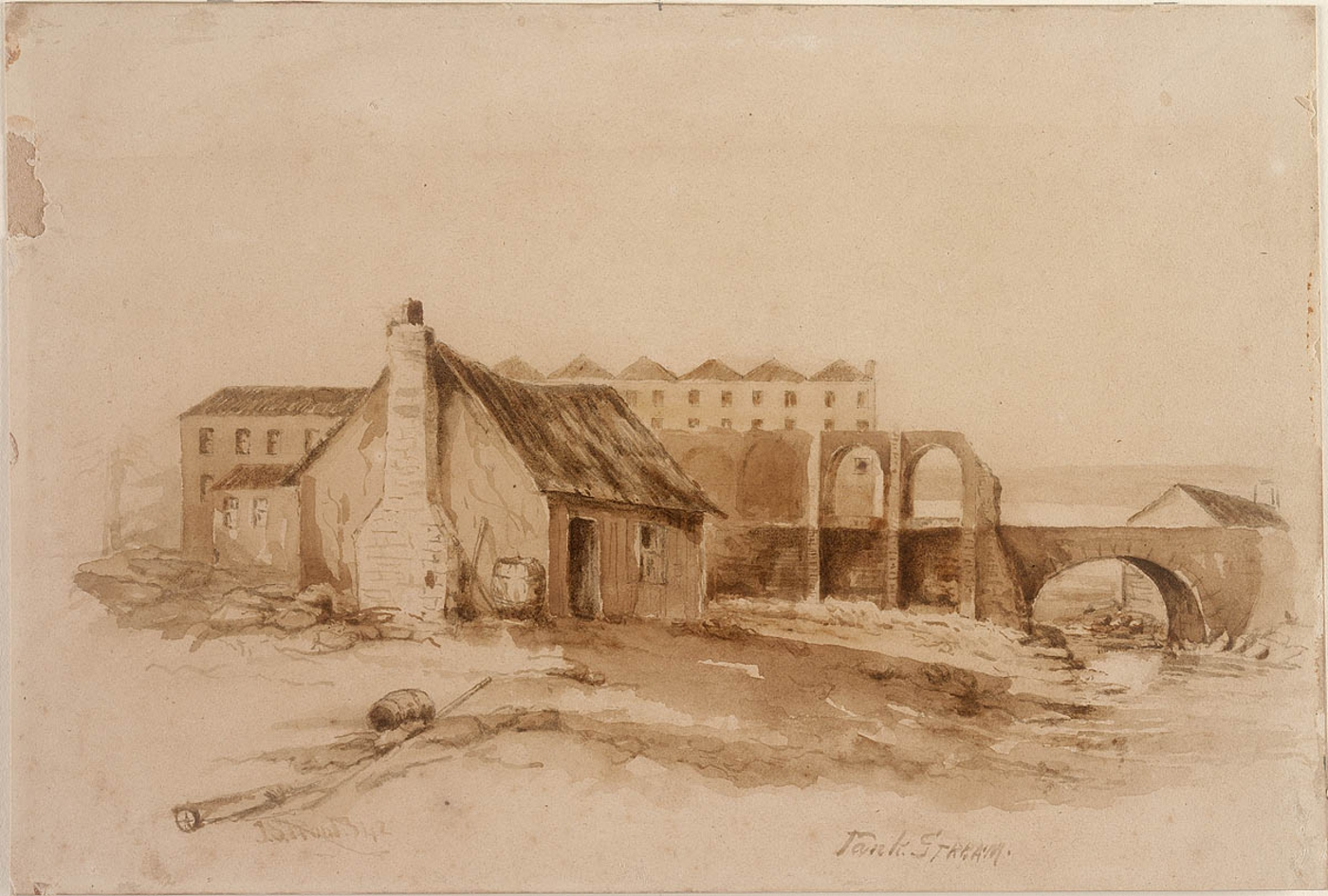
Tank Stream, Sydney, 1842, John Skinner Prout 18 x 26 cm. watercolour (sepia wash) State Library of New South Wales

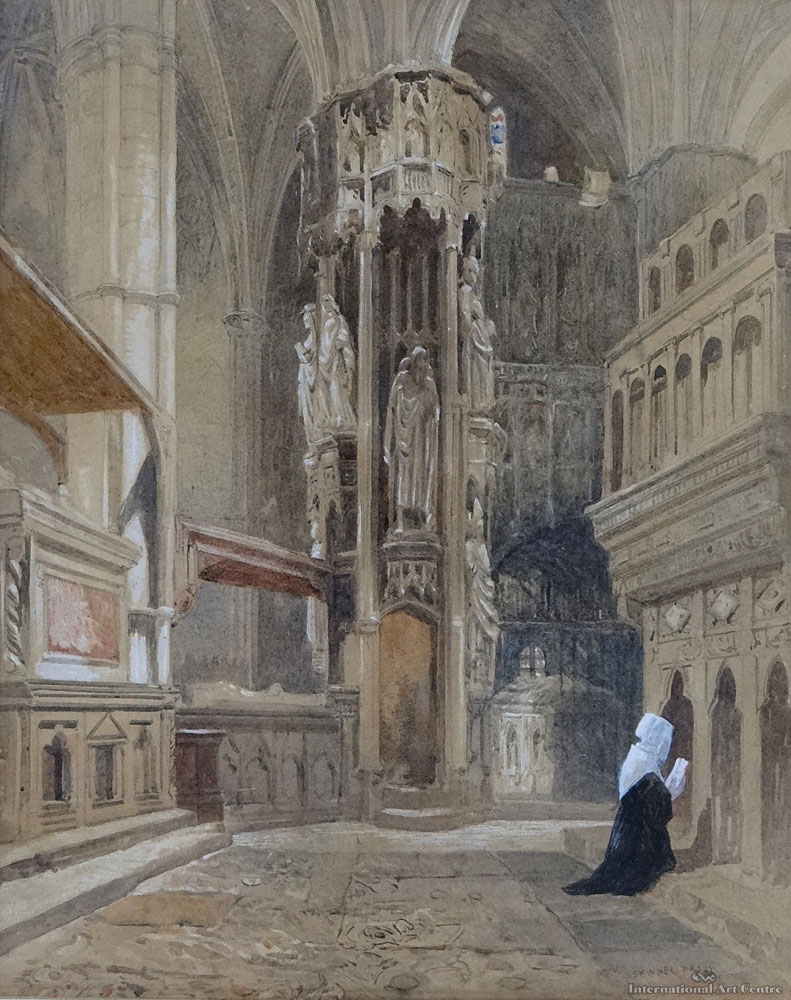
John Skinner Prout, Porsche de la Cathedrale de Reims, watercolour 45.5 cm x 36.5 cm .Private Collection, Auckland New Zealand

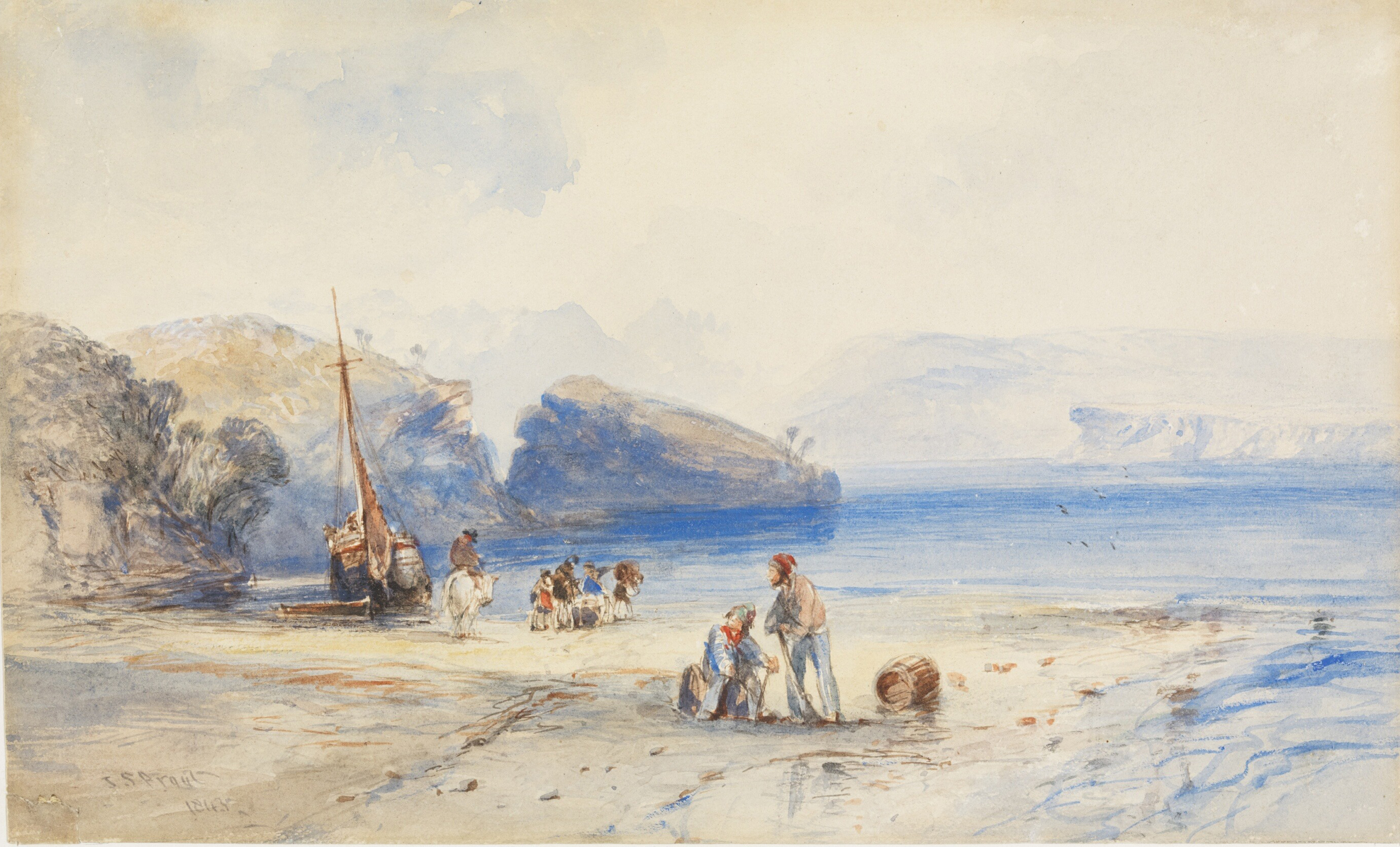
Spring Cove Sydney Harbour, 1843, watercolour, John Skinner Prout, State Library of New South Wales

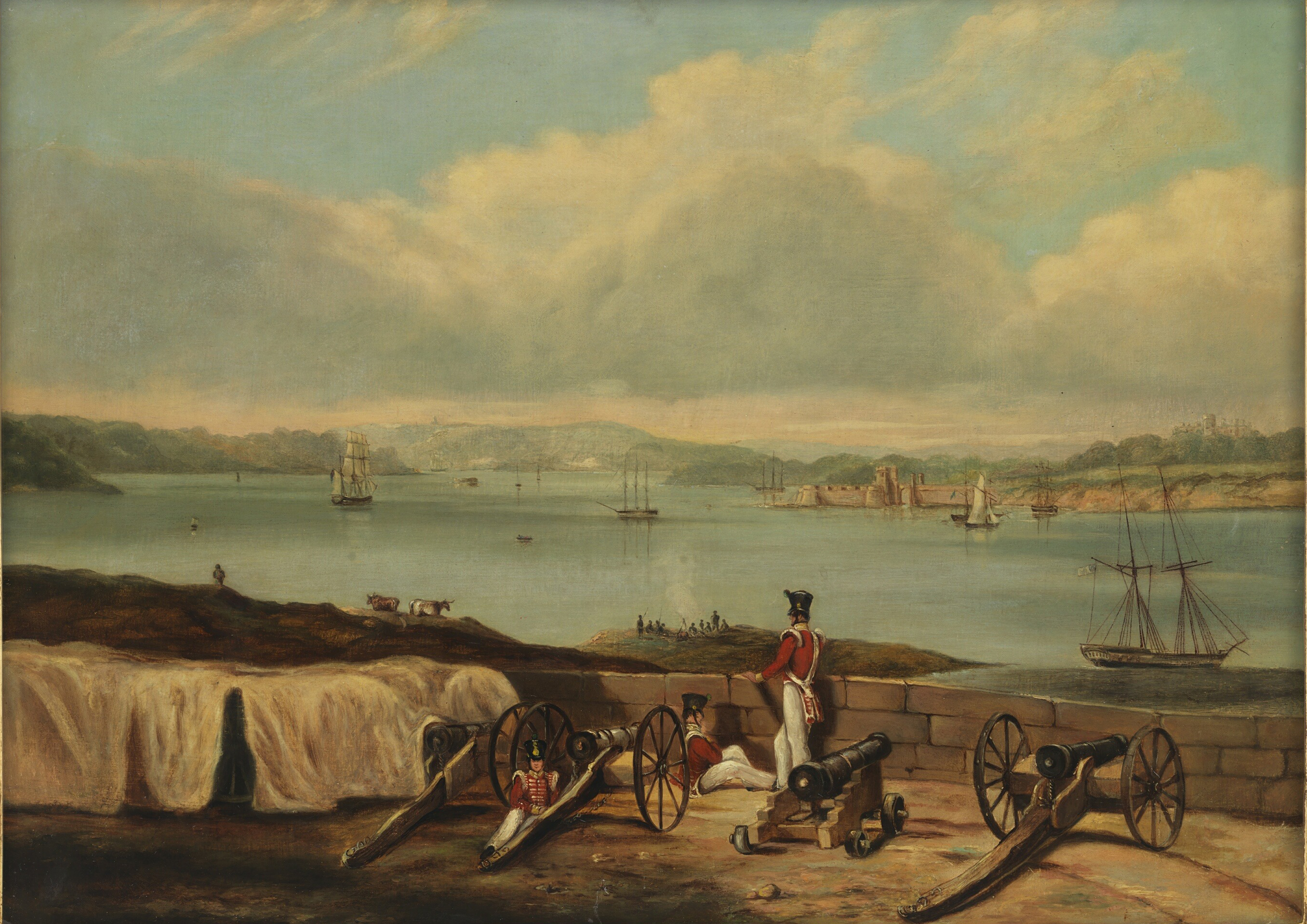
Port Jackson from Dawes Point, Ca. 1842, John Skinner Prout, State Library of New South Wales

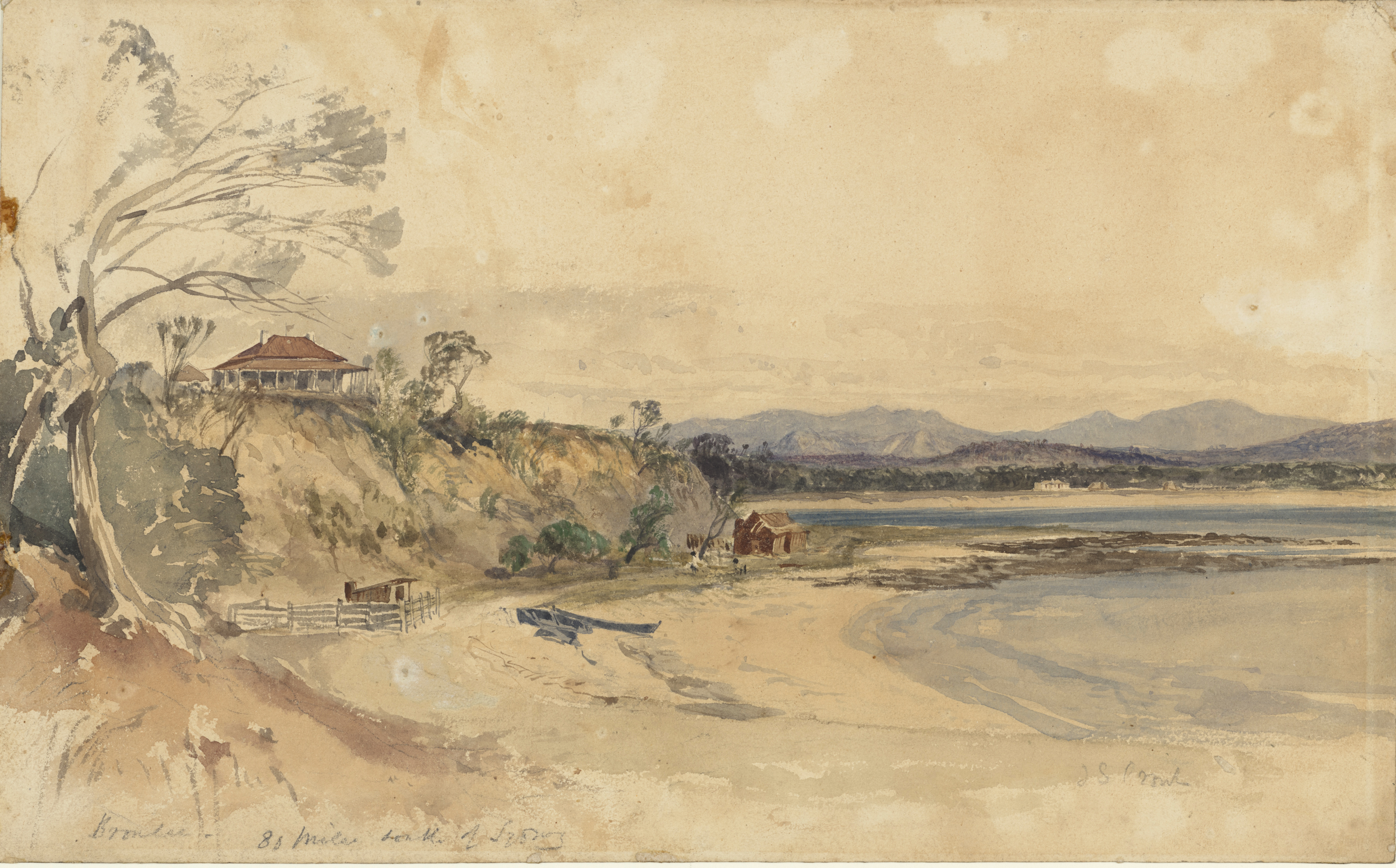
Broulee in 1843. John Skinner Prout. Collection of National Library of Australia

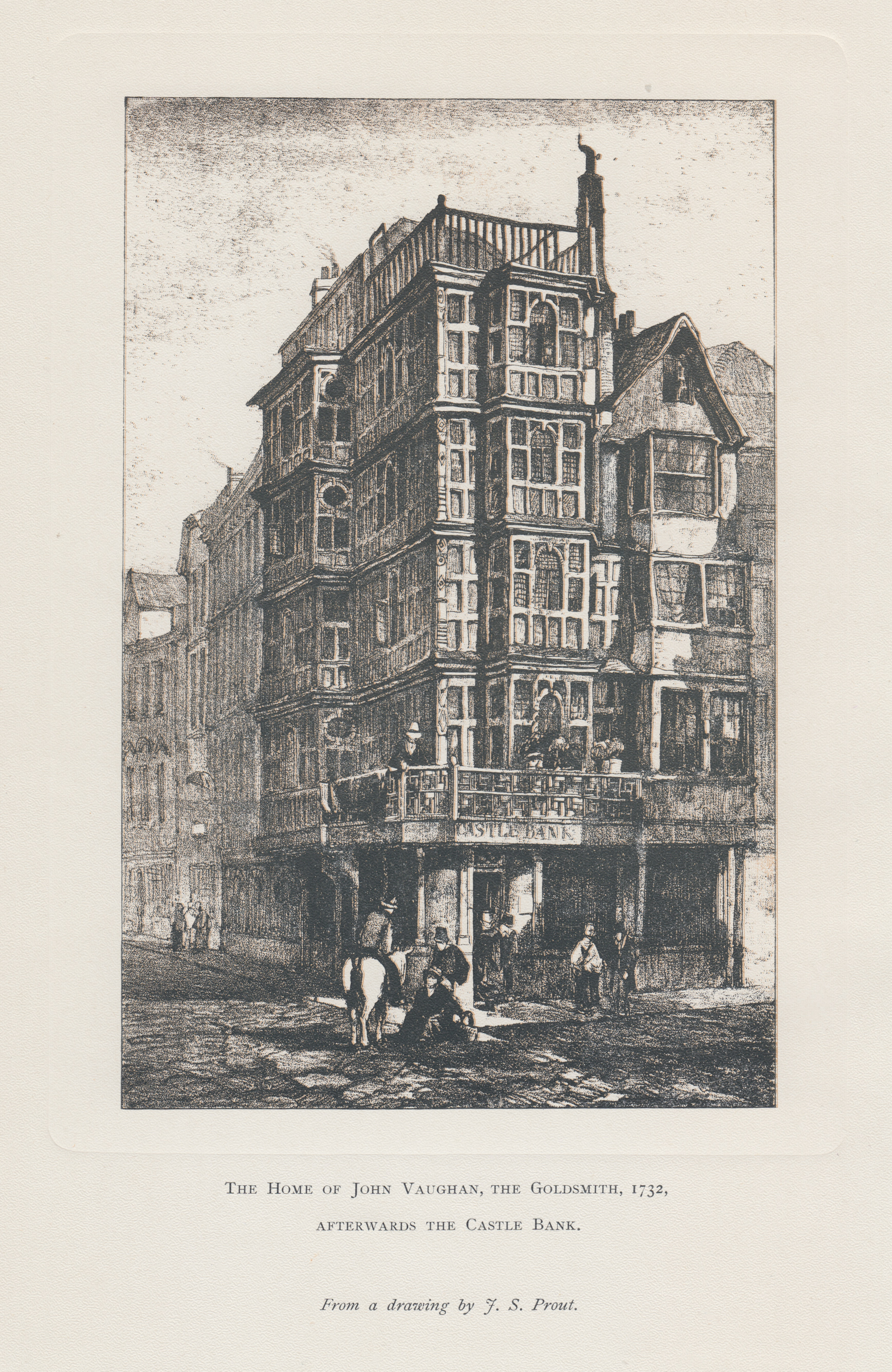
The Dutch House, Bristol c.1850. John Skinner Prout.

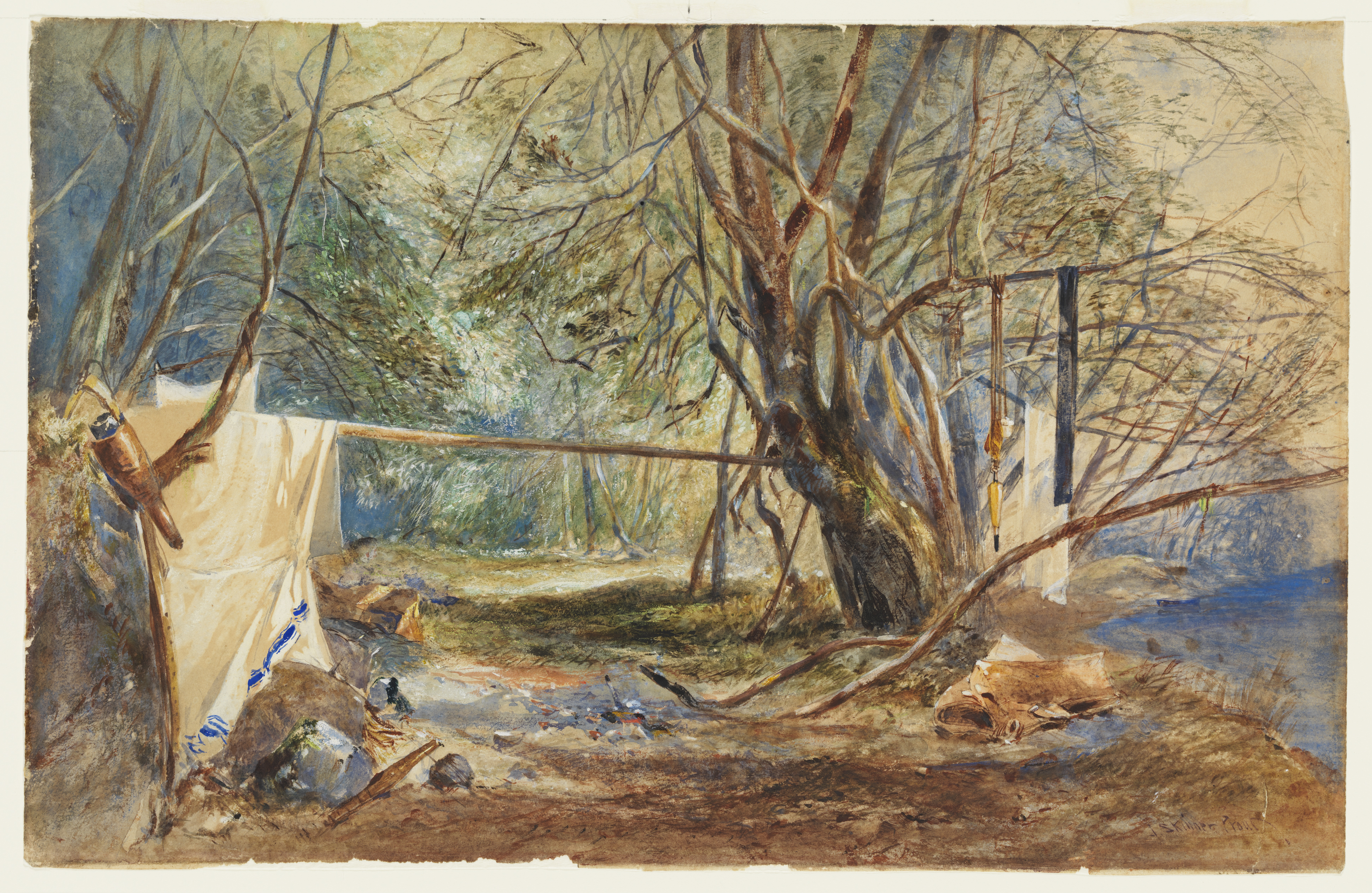
Camping spot, Tasmania, c. 1845, John Skinner Prout, State Library of New South Wales

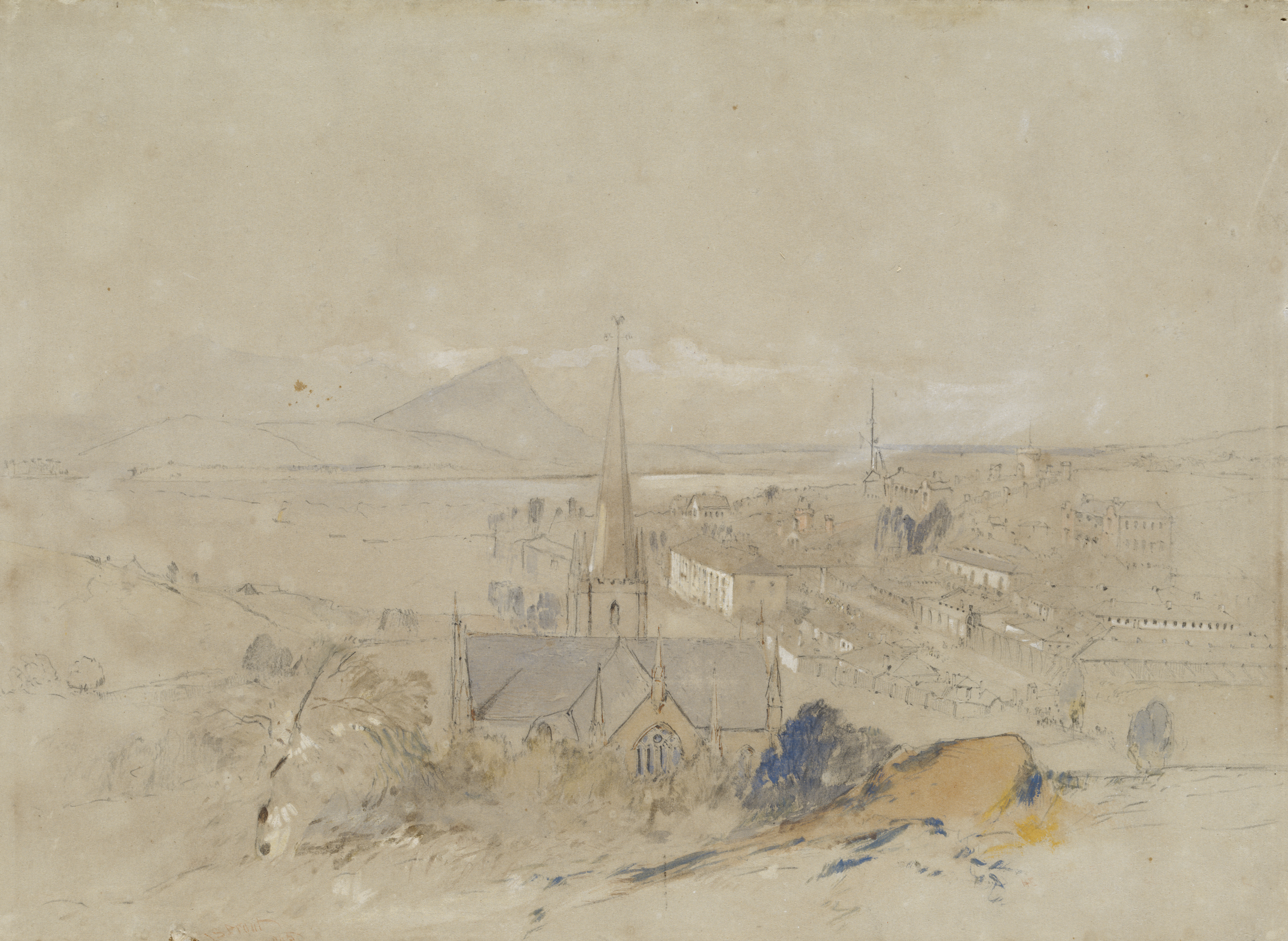
Port Arthur, Tasmania, 1845, John Skinner Prout, State Library of New South Wales

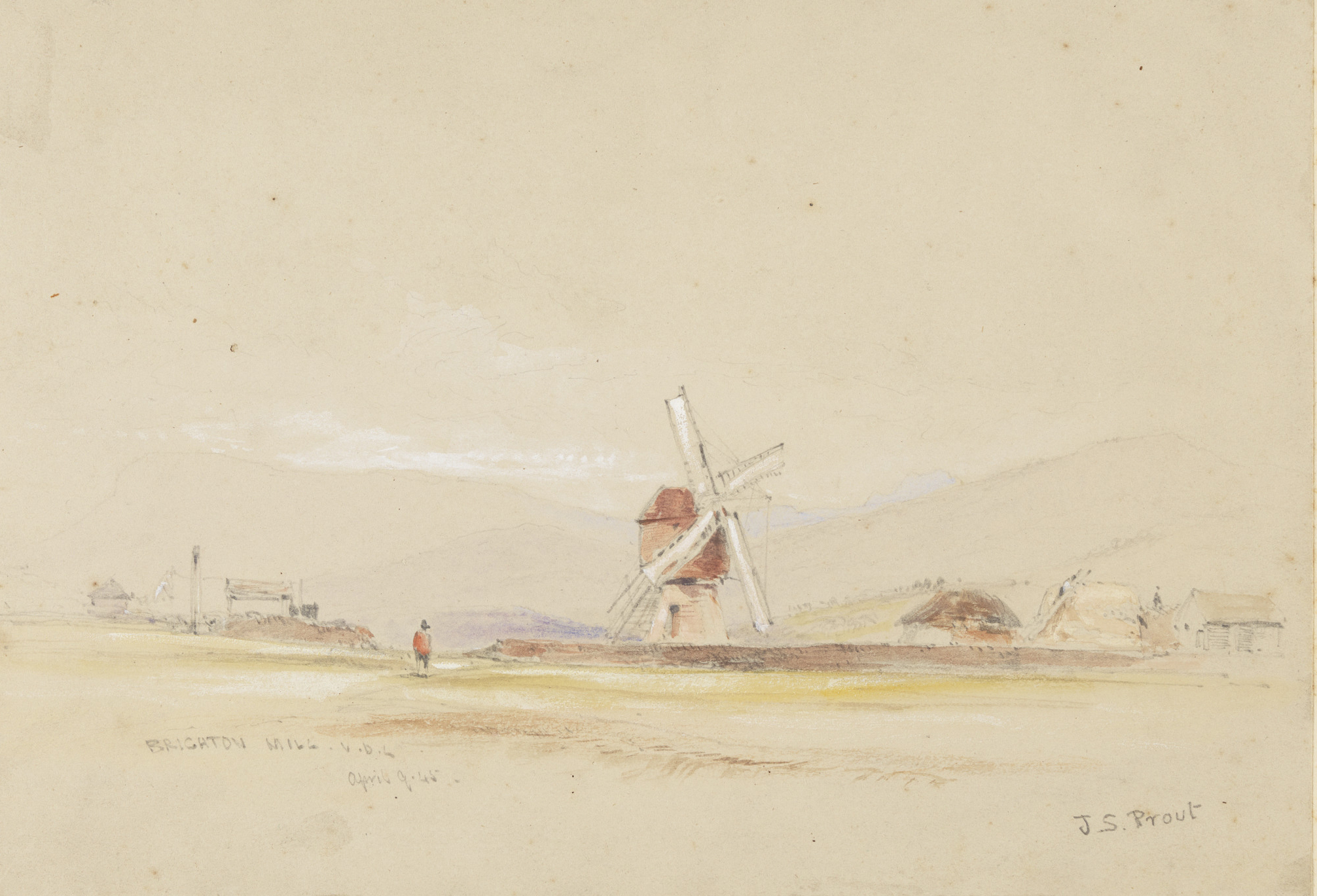
Brighton Mill, Tasmania, John Skinner Prout, 1845, State Library of New South Wales

== Exhibited works ==
- 'Albion Mills, 1843', exhibited in the National Art Gallery of New South Wales loan exhibition, 1897.
- 'Blue Mountain Scenery', National Art Gallery of New South Wales loan exhibition, 1897.
- 'Brady's Bay, Tasmania', National Art Gallery of New South Wales loan exhibition, 1897.
- 'Cockatoo Island, Sydney', National Art Gallery of New South Wales loan exhibition, 1897.
- 'Fort Macquarie, 1843', National Art Gallery of New South Wales loan exhibition, 1897.
- 'Neutral Bay in 1843', National Art Gallery of New South Wales loan exhibition, 1897.
- 'Old House, Manchester', National Art Gallery of New South Wales loan exhibition, 1897.
- 'Street Scene', National Art Gallery of New South Wales loan exhibition, 1897.
- 'The Derwent, Tasmania', National Art Gallery of New South Wales loan exhibition, 1897.
- 'The Escarpment', National Art Gallery of New South Wales loan exhibition, 1897.
- 'The Old Tank Stream, Sydney', National Art Gallery of New South Wales loan exhibition, 1897.
- 'Waterfall', National Art Gallery of New South Wales loan exhibition, 1897.

== Publications ==
- John Skinner Prout, Sydney illustrated (Sydney: J.S. Prout, 1843). Online at National Library of Australia 2261516
- John Skinner Prout, Journal of a voyage from Plymouth to Sydney, in Australia: on board the emigrant ship Royal Sovereign, with a short description of Sydney (London: Smith, Elder, 1844). Online at National Library of Australia 2759188 and the State Library of New South Wales DSM/981.1/P
- John Skinner Prout, Prout's dioramic views of Australia, illustrative of convict and emigrant life: exhibited in the theatre of the Western Literary and Scientific Institution (London: Printed by M. Snell, 1850?). National Library of Australia 111805
- Broadsides promoting Prout's moving panorama of a voyage to Australia and visit to the gold fields exhibited daily at 309 Regent Street, London, 1853–1854. Online at State Library of New South Wales, PAM 85/803
- John Skinner Prout, An illustrated handbook of the voyage to Australia and a visit to the gold fields (London?: s.n., 1852?). Online at State Library of New South Wales MD 4 S 17.
- Brown, T., Kolenberg, H., & Tasmanian Museum Art Gallery. (1986). Skinner Prout in Australia, 1840–48, Hobart: Tasmanian Museum Art Gallery. ISBN 0724614958.
