= John Weale (publisher) =

19th-century English publisher

John Weale (1791 – 18 December 1862, in Maida Vale) was an English publisher of popular scientific, architectural, engineering and educational works.

== Life ==
He first began publishing with George Priestley in St Giles, London who died around 1812, and worked then with Priestley's widow. He took a particular interest in the study of architecture. In 1823 he issued a bibliographical Catalogue of Works on Architecture and the Fine Arts, of which a new edition appeared in 1854. He bought the architectural publishing business at 59 High Holborn built up by Isaac Taylor and his son Josiah Taylor as The Architectural Library, after Josiah's death in 1834.

He followed the Catalogue in 1849–50 with a Rudimentary Dictionary of Terms used in Architecture, Building, and Engineering, a work which reached a fifth edition in 1876.

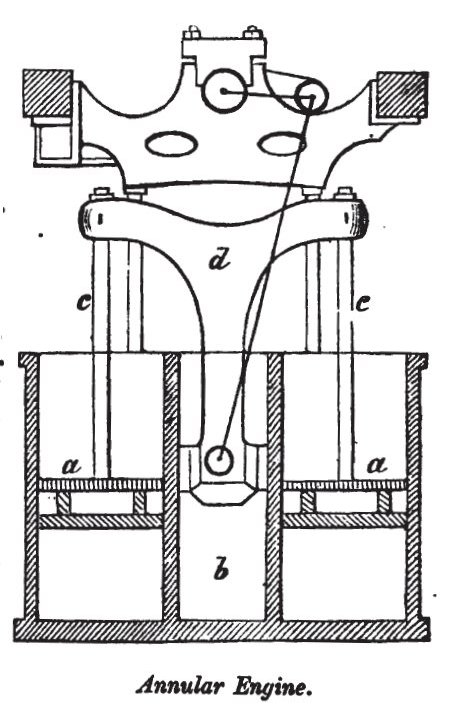
Diagram of an annular engine, from Robert Murray, Rudimentary Treatise on Marine Engines and Steam Vessels (1858), published by John Weale.

Weale died in London on 18 December 1862.

== Publications ==
=== Books ===
Among other books issued by Weale were the following:

- Steam Navigation, Tredgold on the Steam Engine, Appendix A, edited and published by John Weale, London, 1839
- A Series of Examples in Architectural Engineering and Mechanical Drawing, London, 1841; supplemental Description, London, 1842.
- Designs of Ornamental Gates, Lodges, Palisading, and Ironwork of the Royal Parks adjoining the Metropolis, edited by John Weale’ London, 1841.
- The Theory, Practice, and Architecture of Bridges of Stone, Iron, Timber, and Wire, edited by John Weale, London, 1843, 2 vols.; a supplemental volume, edited by George Rowdon Burnell and William Tierney Clark, appeared in 1853.
- Divers Works of Early Masters in Christian Decoration, London, 1846, 2 vols.
- The Great Britain Atlantic Steam Ship, London, 1847.
- Letter to Lord John Russell on the Defence of the Country, London, 1847.
- Joseph Glynn, On the Construction of Cranes, and Machinery for Raising Heavy Bodies, London, 1849
- Edmund Beckett Denison, Clock and Watch Making, London, 1850
- Alan Stevenson, On the History, Construction, and Illumination of Lighthouses, London, 1850
- London Exhibited in 1851, London, 1851; 2nd edit., 1852.
- Joseph Glynn, On the Power of Water, as Applied to Drive Flour Mills, and to Give Motion to Turbines and other Hydrostatic Engines
- Designs and Examples of Cottages, Villas, and Country Houses, London, 1857.
- Examples for Builders, Carpenters, and Joiners, London, 1857.
- Old English and French Ornaments, Comprising 244 Designs. Collected by John Weale, London, 1858
- John George Swindell, Rudimentary Treatise on Well-Digging, Boring, and Pump-Work, London, 1861
- Thomas Roger Smith, Acoustics, London, 1861
- William Snow Harris, On Galvanism, London, 1869

=== Serial publications ===
Wealed edited:

- Weale's Quarterly Papers on Architecture, London, 1843–5, 4 vols.
- Weale's Quarterly Papers on Engineering, London, 1843–6, 6 vols.

=== Book series ===
- Weale's Classical Series
- Weale's Educational Series
- Weale's Rudimentary Series
- Weale's Scientific & Technical Series

== Weale's Rudimentary Series ==
Weale was on good terms with many men of science, and published cheap literature for technical education. His Rudimentary Series (over 130 works, usually selling at one shilling) and other educational series comprised standard works, both in classics and science. They were suggested initially by William Reid, and were continued after his death, first by Virtue Brothers (James Sprent Virtue) and by Crosby Lockwood and Son. The Rudimentary Series was later followed by the Weale's Scientific & Technical Series (1881-1923), published by Crosby, Lockwood and Son.

Source: Lists at end of the publications. The series was later taken on by the publisher Crosby Lockwood, who added volumes while retaining the system of reference numbers (across editions).

Series number	First published	Author	Title	Comments
1	1849?	George Fownes	Rudimentary Chemistry	WorldCat editions archive.org Read Online (1853).
2	1848	Charles Tomlinson	Introduction to the Study of Natural Philosophy	WorldCat editions
3	1849	Joseph Ellison Portlock	Rudimentary Geology	WorldCat editions There was an 1871 rewrite as Rudimentary Treatise on Geology by Ralph Tate: WorldCat editions
4, 5	1848	Delvalle Varley	Rudimentary Mineralogy	WorldCat editions Later editions with James Dwight Dana, as Rudimentary Treatise on Mineralogy. Delvalle Varley was the second wife of John Varley, and daughter of Wilson Lowry; her mother Rebekah Eliza Delvalle was a mineralogist.
6	1849	Charles Tomlinson	Rudimentary Mechanics	WorldCat editions archive.org Read Online
7	1848	William Snow Harris	Rudimentary Electricity	WorldCat editions Google Books, 1851 edition
8, 9, 10	1850	William Snow Harris	Rudimentary Magnetism	WorldCat editions
11	1852	Edward Highton	The Electric Telegraph: its history and progress	Edward Highton was the brother of Henry Highton, and they both experimented with electricity, taking a particular interest in telegraphy. WorldCat editions archive.org
12		Tomlinson	Pneumatics	
13, 14, 15, 15*	1848	Henry Law	Rudiments of Civil Engineering	Henry Law (1824–1900) was a civil engineer, a pupil of Brunel much involved in the Thames Tunnel. WorldCat editions archive.org Read Online, 1852 edition
16	1852	William Henry Leeds	Rudimentary Architecture (Orders)	Internet Archive
17	1849	Thomas Talbot Bury	Rudimentary Architecture (Styles)	WorldCat editions Internet Archive (2nd edition)
18, 19		Edward Lacy Garbett	Architecture (Principles of Design)	Garbett (died 1900) was son of the architect Edward William Garbett.
20, 21		G. Pyne	Perspective	
22		Edward Dobson	Art of Building	Dobson emigrated to New Zealand where he had a successful career as an engineer.
23, 24		Edward Dobson	Art of Tile-making, Brick-making	
25, 26		Edward Dobson	Masonry and Stone-cutting	
27, 28		George Field	Art of Painting	
29		G. R. Dempsey	Art of Draining Lands	
30		Dempsey	Art of Draining and Sewage of Towns and Buildings	
31		Burnell	Art of Well-sinking and Boring	
32		J. F. Heather	Art of the Use of Instruments	
33	1853	Samuel Hughes	A treatise on gas works	Samuel Hughes (c. 1816–1870), son of the engineer Thomas Hughes, was a civil engineer and Fellow of the Geological Society. WorldCat edition
45		G. R. Burnell	Limes, cements, mortars, concretes, mastics, plastering etc.	George Rowdon Burnell (1814–1868) was a writer on architecture and engineering, "one of the very few who have united a Fellowship of the Royal Institution of British Architects with a Membership of the Institution of Civil Engineers". WorldCat edition
61	1850	Thomas Baker	Rudimentary treatise on mensuration	
63-65	1852-53	G. H. Andrews	Rudimentary treatise on agricultural engineering	George Henry Andrews (1816–1898), though trained as an engineer, was better known as a marine watercolorist. WorldCat edition
66	1852	John Donaldson	Rudimentary treatise on clay lands and loamy soils	John Donaldson (1799–1876) described himself as a 'Professor of Botany'. He taught at the Agricultural Training College at Hoddesdon, established in the 1840s under the headmastership of William Haselwood. WorldCat edition
69-70		Charles Child Spencer	A rudimentary and practical treatise on music	Charles Child Spencer (1797–1869) was an organist and choirmaster of St. James's Chapel, Clapton, London. WorldCat edition
80		Robert Murray	Rudimentary treatise on marine engines and steam vessels	WorldCat edition
83	1853	Editor Charles Tomlinson, materials by Alfred Charles Hobbs, compiler by George Dodd	Rudimentary Treatise on the Construction of Locks	Alfred Charles Hobbs; George Dodd (1853). Rudimentary Treatise on the Construction of Locks. J. Weale.
91	1867	James Hann	Elements Of Plane Trigonometry	
99–100		John Radford Young	Tables intended to facilitate the operations of navigation and nautical astronomy	John Radford Young (1799–1885) was professor of mathematics at Belfast College from 1833 to 1849. WorldCat edition
101	1852	W. S. B. Woolhouse	The elements of differential calculus	WorldCat edition
102	1852	Homersham Cox	The integral calculus	At archive.org
	1852	Robert Main	Rudimentary Astronomy	
132		S. H. Brooks	Erection of Dwelling-houses	WorldCat edition

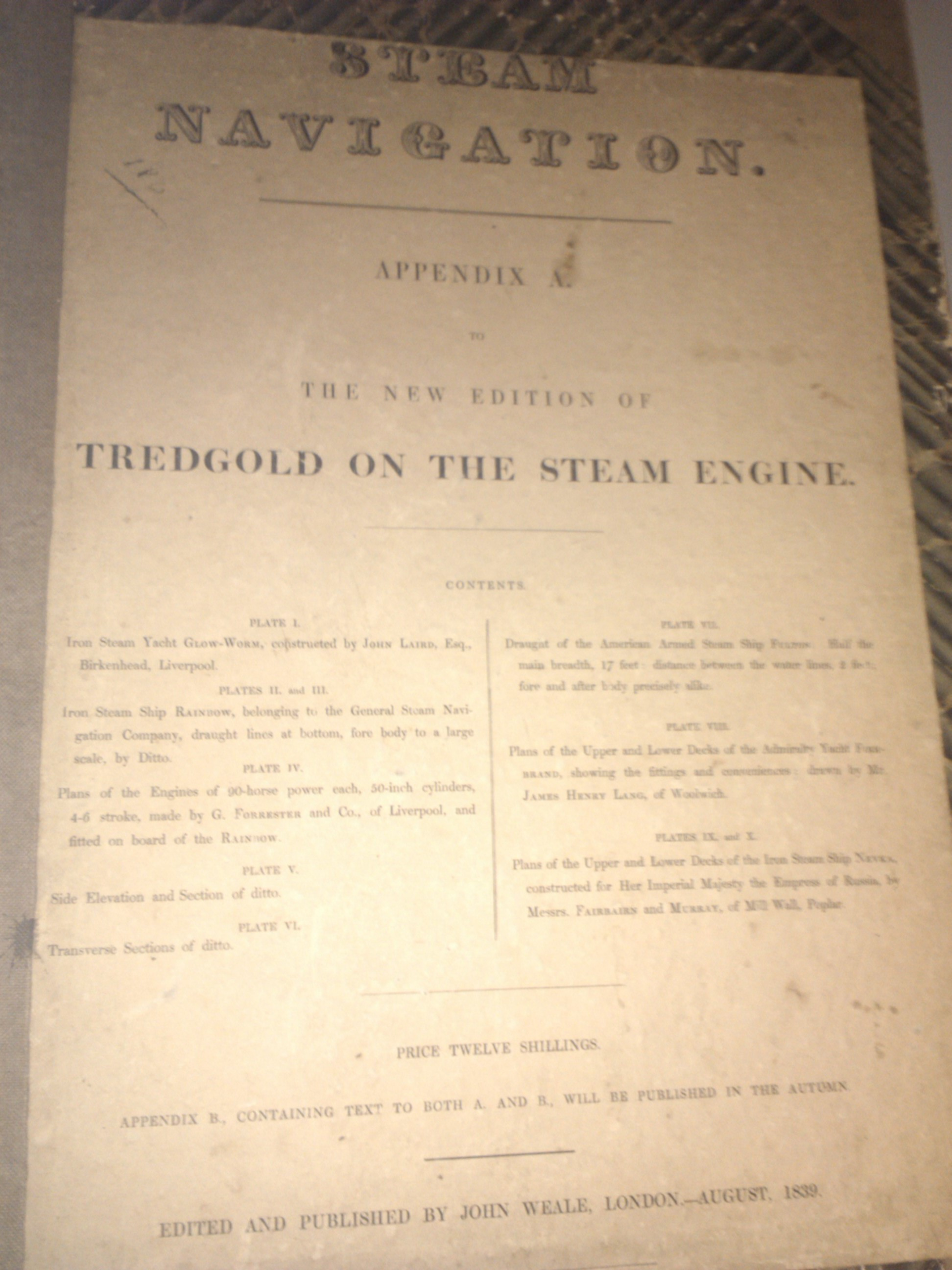
Appendix A, Steam Navigation (1839)

== Steam Navigation ==
One of John Weale's earliest books published was Steam Navigation, Tredgold on the Steam Engine Appendix A which was edited and published under direction from Thomas Tredgold himself. Steam Navigation, Tredgold on the Steam Engine, Appendix A was printed by W. Hughes, King’s Head Court, Gough Square.

Its cover price in August 1839 was twelve shillings.

== Notes ==
Attribution

This article incorporates text from a publication now in the public domain: "Weale, John". Dictionary of National Biography. London: Smith, Elder & Co. 1885–1900.
