= John Bidlake =

English author, artist and educator

John Bidlake (1755 – 17 February 1814) was an English author, artist and educator.

== Biography ==
Bidlake was born in Plymouth, the son of a jeweller, and educated at Plymouth Grammar School and Christ Church, Oxford, where he graduated B.A., M.A., and D.D.

In the last decade of the 18th century until his death Bidlake was the Headmaster of his old school in Plymouth, where he taught both Samuel Prout and Benjamin Haydon. Among his other protégés were artist Charles Lock Eastlake, Philip Hutchins Rogers, a marine and landscape artist who later exhibited at the Royal Academy; and Nathaniel Howard, a charity boy who became "an elegant classical scholar, ... a translator of Dante into blank verse," and a Persian scholar of note. Bidlake has been described as "a man of strict religious principles, but not intolerant." He was rather different from the average schoolmaster of the period. As well he was "a little deformed man," whose "back was bent from fever".

Bidlake was curate of Plymouth's Stonehouse Chapel, now St George's Church, from 1785 to 1812. He also held the position of Common Chaplain to the Prince of Wales (later to become George III) and the Duke of Clarence (later to become William IV).

In 1811 Bidlake gave the Bampton Lecture delivered at St Mary's Church, Oxford and titled The Truth And Consistency Of Divine Revelation, With Some Remarks On The Contrary Extremes Of Infidelity And Enthusiasm: In Eight Discourses. Unfortunately, during this lecture he suffered a stroke as a result of which he lost his eyesight. The Lecture was later to be published as a book in an effort to raise funds for his welfare;

"The Rev. Dr. Bidlake, appointed to read the Bampton Lecture, during the delivery of the third discourse was seized with an affliction of the head, which terminated in blindness. He is without any preferment, and has been obliged to give up the Curacy of Stonehouse, Devon, from which the principal part of his income was derived. It has been proposed to print a new edition of his Bampton Lectures, and the book will be ready for delivery in the course of a few months. In the meantime, Dr. Bidlake's health has been much impaired; and it has pleased God to fill up the measure of his distress by an attack of Paralysis, which his recently seized him. Under these circuinstances his demand for immediate assistance and support is become more urgent; and those persons who have expressed an intention of subscribing to the Work, and who have not yet paid their Subscription, are requested, if they think proper, to advance the same., for the benevolent purpose abovementioned. The attention of others is solicited to this distressful case; and those who feel disposed to assist a Clergyman who is the author of many useful Publications, and who is known to his immediate neighbours by a conscientious discharge of his Parochial duties, are requested to make their Donations to Messrs. Rivington, booksellers, St. Paul's Church-yard; Mr. Rees, bookseller, Pall-mall; or to Mr. Hatchard, bookseller, Piccadilly, it is proposed, in the first place, to relieve the immediate pressure occasioned by this uncommon calamity; and then to apply the remainder of the money subscribed, to the purchase of an annuity, to insure to Dr. Bidlake a comfortable maintenance for the rest of his life. A numerous and respectable List of Subscribers may be seen at either of the 'above places' If any Gentleman wishes to obtain farther information of this case, or of the character of Dr. Bidlake, he is referred to Dr. Cole, the Vice-Chancellor of Oxford."

== Publications ==
Bidlake's published works included seven volumes of poetry, a number of sermons and "discourses" a five-act tragedy in verse, a "moral tale," and an introduction to the study of geography.

- 1786 Sunday schools, recommended. A sermon, preached at the chapel in Stonehouse. P.F. Maurice; R. Trewman, Exeter.
- 1788 Elegy written on the author's revisiting the place of his former residence Law, Foulder & Deighton, London.
- 1789 Slave-trade: A sermon Law, Faulder, Lowndes, and Deighton, London; Trewman, Exeter; and Goadby, Sherborne.
- 1790 A sermon, preached before the Society of Free and Accepted Masons Haydon, Plymouth
- 1794 The poetical works of J. Bidlake Murray & Harding, London
- 1795 Sermons, on various subjects Published by T. Chapman (London)
- 1796 The Sea, a poem in two books Published by T. Chapman (London)
- 1797 The country parson, a poem. Published by T. Cadell Jr. & W. Davies, (London)
- 1799 Eugenio, or, The precepts of Prudentius: a moral tale T. Chapman, 151 Fleet St London
- 1800 The summer's eve: a poem R. Bliss, Oxford
- 1802 A Sermon and An Oration John Murray, Fleet St. London.
- 1802 Youth, a poem Messrs. Murray and Highley, London.
- 1803 Sermons on Various Subjects John Murray, 32 Fleet St. London.
- 1804 Virginia; or the Fall of the Decemvirs: a Tragedy John Murray, Fleet St. London.
- 1813 The Truth And Consistency Of Divine Revelation, With Some Remarks On The Contrary Extremes Of Infidelity And Enthusiasm: In Eight Discourses published by Richard Rees of Pall Mall. Republished by Kessinger May 2009.
