= Plymouth Grammar School =

Grammar school in Plymouth, England

Plymouth Grammar School, sometimes called Plymouth Corporation Grammar School, was a grammar school in Plymouth, England.

The school was closed in 1937.

== History ==
Founded or refounded in 1562, one source states that the school was established by the Corporation of Plymouth in the reign of King Henry VII, paying the schoolmaster £10 a year and providing rooms over an ancient chapel. A late 16th-century pupil was Martin Blake, who was believed to be a grandson of William Blake, one of the school's founders.

A report of 1841 notes the existence of letters patent of Elizabeth I in the 15th year of her reign, confirmed by letters patent of Charles II and an Act of Parliament in the same year.

The heyday of the school was under the master John Bidlake (1755–1814), an old boy of the school who was an author and artist as well as a schoolmaster. At the school he taught at least four boys who went on to become notable artists, Benjamin Haydon, Samuel Prout, Philip Hutchins Rogers, and Charles Lock Eastlake, and also Nathaniel Howard, later a classical and Persian scholar who translated Dante, and the electrician William Snow Harris.

There was a charitable trust founded in 1732 by the will of a Plymouth apothecary, Henry Kelway, which was to educate and clothe as many boys born in Plymouth or Saltash as the funds would stretch to, with preference for Kelway's own descendants, and if possible to send them on to Oxford to be prepared for holy orders, which by 1818 occasionally happened. The trust funds left by Kelway then amounted to £4,860, invested in Bank Stock, equivalent to £448,222 in 2023.

In 1821, the school was called a charitable institution and its buildings were in St Catherine's Street, Plymouth. They consisted of a school-room, described as a narrow, gloomy apartment with "forms for seven classes", and a house and garden for the master, the Rev. W. Williams, together with a boys' play ground, all next to the school-room.

In 1867, the school was teaching 45 boys, of whom ten were foundationers, paying two guineas a year to be taught Classics and English, the rest paying £9 a year for Classics, English, French, German, and other subjects. The Master was the Rev. W. Harpley, MA.

Originally for boys only, in the twentieth century the school began to admit girls, becoming coeducational. Its last headmaster, Frank Sandon, commented in 1950 on the closure of the school in 1937: "Unfortunately, the Plymouth City Council did not believe in co-education and I did, and... my school was closed."

== Notable former pupils ==
- John Bidlake (1755–1814), author, artist, and schoolmaster
- Sir George Birdwood (1832–1917), Indian civil servant and naturalist
- Octavian Blewitt (1810–1884), author
- Guise Brittan (1809–1876), Commissioner of Crown Lands, New Zealand
- Charles Lock Eastlake (1793–1865), painter
- J. Rendel Harris (1852–1941), biblical scholar and curator of manuscripts
- William Snow Harris (1791–1867), electrician
- Benjamin Haydon (1786–1846), painter
- Nathaniel Howard, classical and Persian scholar
- Collingwood Hughes (1872–1963), Conservative politician
- Samuel Prout (1783–1852), watercolour painter
- Philip Hutchins Rogers (1794–1853), painter
- Sir John Snell (1859–1938), electrical engineer
- Bertram Steele (1870–1934), scientist, first professor of chemistry at the University of Queensland
- Sydney Thelwall (1834—1922), clergyman
- Robert Walling (1895–1976), soldier, journalist, and poet
