= Delvalle Lowry =

British geologist, mineralogist, author and scientific illustrator

Delvalle Eliza Rebekah Lowry
- Born: 22 September 1800; London, England
- Died: 23 December 1859 (aged 59); London, England
- Other name: Delvalle Varley
- Known for: Conversations on Mineralogy; The Engineer's Manual of Mineralogy and Geology; Rudimentary Geology
- Spouse: John Varley
- Scientific career
- Fields: Geology

Delvalle Lowry (22 September 1800 – 23 December 1859, married name Varley) was a British geologist and mineralogist and author. Her first book was a popularization of mineralogy for a general audience, but her two later books were more technically oriented.

== Life and work ==
Delvalle Eliza Rebekah Lowry was born on 22 September 1800 in London, England, to the engraver Wilson Lowry, FRS, and his second wife, Rebekah Delvalle, a mineralogist and scientific lecturer. Through her maternal aunt, Abigail, Lowry's cousin was the economist David Ricardo.

She was educated at home, growing up exposed to her parents' circle of artistic and scientific friends, such as John Henry Heuland, William Phillips, John Mawe, and Charles Konig, to name just those mentioned in the acknowledgements of her first book, Conversations on Mineralogy, published in 1822. Lowry and her father engraved the illustrations for the book from original sketches. Presented in the popular format of a conversation between two (female) students and their instructor, the book was generally well-received and went through three editions in Britain and an American edition. Lowry appears to have been mostly concerned with conveying her information clearly to those with a bare knowledge of mineralogy and her prose has been criticized for its stilted dialogue and lack of character development. It was notable, however, for avoiding any religious references common at that time.

Lowry married the much older painter and astrologist John Varley in 1825 and they did not have any children. Varley was spendthrift by nature and had very little business sense; he died of a kidney infection hiding from his creditors in 1842. She was awarded a pension from the Royal Academy after his death. Lowry subsequently published two books using her married name, The Engineer's Manual of Mineralogy and Geology in 1846 and Rudimentary Geology in 1848. The Engineer's Manual was intended for professionals in the field and Rudimentary Geology was published by John Weale in his 'Rudimentary Series' of scientific books. It went through at least four editions, the last two of which were entitled Rudimentary Treatise on Mineralogy and included a section by the American geologist James Dana. Lowry died in London on 23 December 1859.
