= William Snow Harris =

British physician

Sir William Snow Harris
- Born: 1 April 1791; Plymouth, Devon, England
- Died: 22 January 1867 (aged 75)
- Occupations: solicitor and physician

Sir William Snow Harris (1 April 1791 – 22 January 1867) was a British physician and electrical researcher, nicknamed Thunder-and-Lightning Harris, and noted for his invention of a successful system of lightning conductors for ships. It took many years of campaigning, research and successful testing before the British Royal Navy changed to Harris's conductors from their previous less effective system. One of the successful test vessels was HMS Beagle which survived lightning strikes unharmed on her famous voyage with Charles Darwin.

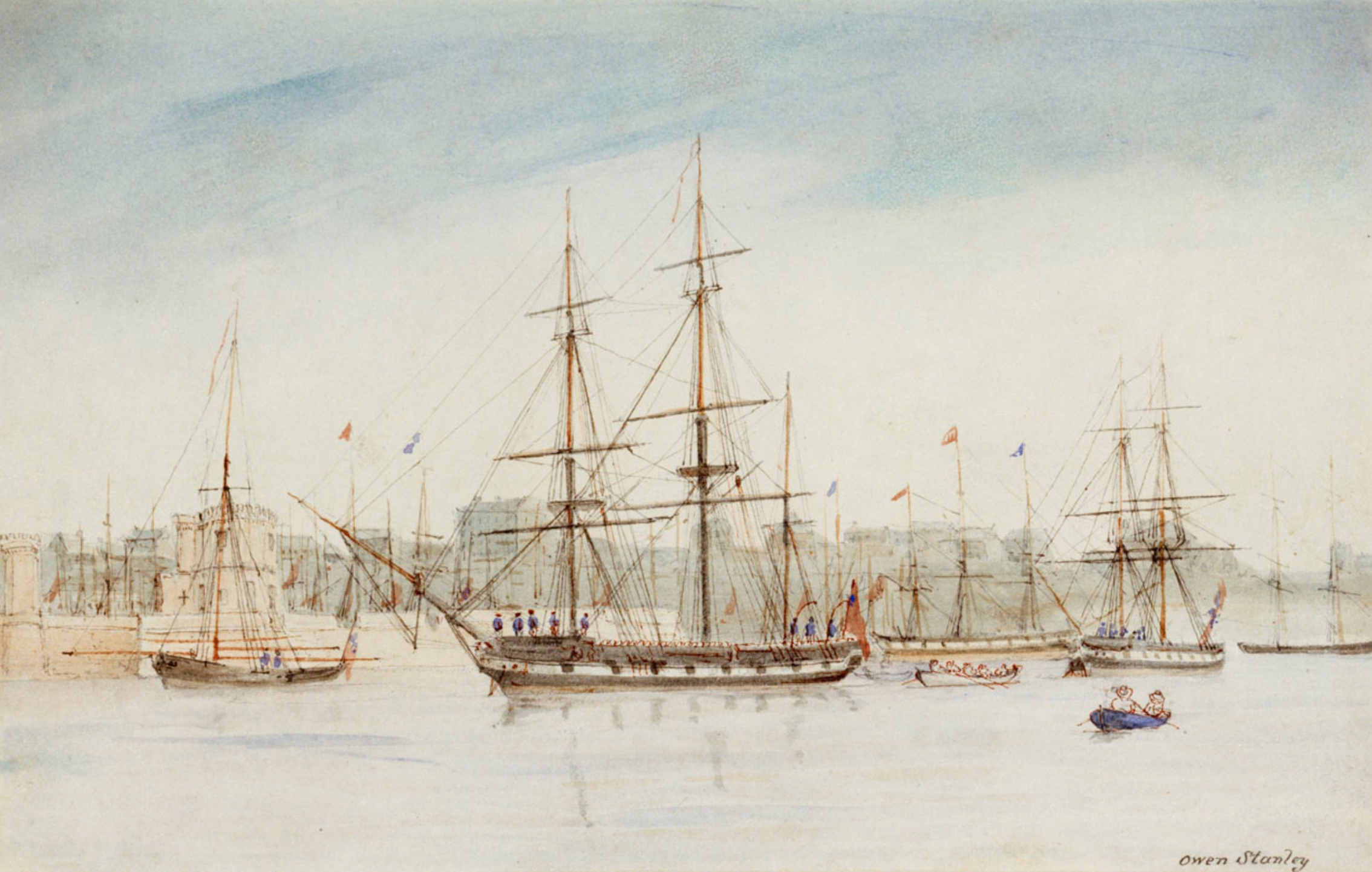
HMS Beagle was one of the first ships protected from lightning by Harris's conductors.

== Life and work ==
Harris was born in Plymouth on 1 April 1791. His family was well established as solicitors in the town, and he went to Plymouth Grammar School. His childhood in the seaport which included the naval dockyard renamed Devonport gave him an enduring interest in ships.

He went to the University of Edinburgh to study medicine and qualified as a physician, then returned to Plymouth and set up a medical practice. His interest in the emerging science of electricity led him to invent his improved lightning conductor for ships in 1820. In 1824 he married, and decided to abandon his profession of medicine to concentrate on his studies of electricity. His paper "On the Relative Powers of various Metallic Substances as Conductors of Electricity", read before the Royal Society in 1826, led to him being elected a fellow of the society in 1831. He read papers on the elementary laws of electricity to the Society in 1834, 1836 and 1839, and also sent accounts of his experiments and discoveries to the Royal Society of Edinburgh. His experimental investigations into the force of high intensity electricity were published in the Philosophical Transactions of 1834. In 1835 Harris received the Royal Society's Copley Medal for his "Experimental Investigations of the Forces of Electricity of high Intensity".

Harris was curator of apparatus in the museum of The Plymouth Institution (now The Plymouth Athenaeum) and held the office of President twice.

His work on lightning conductors for ships gained him a government annuity of £300 "in consideration of services in the cultivation of science", and to overcome continued objections to his proposals he published an 1843 work on Thunderstorms, as well as contributing papers to The Nautical Magazine on lightning damage. He was knighted in 1847 after the system had been adopted and shown successful, and was given a grant of £5,000. Though his continued research did not find new discoveries, his manuals of Electricity, Galvanism and Magnetism were published between 1848 and 1856 and went through several editions. When he died in Plymouth on 22 January 1867 he had a Treatise on Frictional Electricity in preparation, and it was published later that year.

== Lightning conductor for ships ==
The lightning rod invented by Benjamin Franklin in 1752 suggested a way of avoiding the common problem of lightning causing damage to the wooden sailing ships of the period. In Britain, the Royal Navy chose a protection system with a chain draped into the sea from the top of the mast as a lightning conductor. This system proved unsatisfactory: the chain was only supposed to be raised up the mast when lightning was anticipated, and lightning often struck unexpectedly. When the chain was raised it was a nuisance to seamen aloft in the rigging to deal with the square rigged sails, and even when it was raised, lightning strokes would sometimes damage the chain or the ship. There were also fears that the conductors would attract lightning to the ship, and prejudices against their use. The French navy devised a modified system in which the chain was led down the permanent rigging to connect to the copper sheathing which was used to protect the hull below the waterline against damage from collisions and shipworms. In the early 19th century they replaced the chains by metal cables.

Harris invented a new system in 1820, with lightning conductor plates fixed along spars and down the aft side of the mast, right down through the hull to connect to the copper sheathing of the hull. All the principal metallic masses in the ship were to be bonded to the conductor to ensure that there were no side flashes. He proposed this system to the Admiralty in 1821 but found them unresponsive to his proposals, and he campaigned to persuade the Navy to test his system, and to publicise the extent of the problem. They agreed to test the system on eleven vessels, starting in 1830.

=== Trials on HMS Beagle ===
One of the first vessels outfitted for the test was HMS Beagle, which had returned from its first survey voyage to South America, and was extensively rebuilt and refitted for the second survey voyage. As part of this work, "lightning-conductors, invented by Mr. Harris, were fixed in all the masts, the bowsprit, and even in the flying jib-boom." The captain, Robert FitzRoy, had been given command in the middle of the first expedition after the previous captain committed suicide. Before being given that command, FitzRoy had been a lieutenant on board HMS Thetis in Rio harbour when her foremast was struck by lightning. The "fore-topmast was shivered into a mere collection of splinters" and the foremast irreparably damaged, delaying the ship for almost two months while "the foremast was taken out afterwards, and replaced by another, purchased from the Brazilian government at a great expense."

Near the end of 1831, while the Beagle was still being fitted out at Devonport in preparation for sailing, the recently graduated Charles Darwin arrived in Plymouth to take up the opportunity of sailing on the ship as a self-funded gentleman naturalist who would be a companion to the captain while the ship was at sea, and who would make his own expeditions inland while the ship's crew was surveying the coasts. He told his sister that he had "breakfasted yesterday with a Mr. Harris whom I like more than anybody I have seen.— He has written a great deal on Electricity", and wrote to tell his university tutor John Stevens Henslow about his progress, noting that he had met "one or two pleasant people, foremost of whom is Mr. Thunder & Lightning Harris, whom I daresay you have heard of." In his diary he noted that on the evening of 21 November he attended a "popular lecture from Mr Harris on his lightning conductors" at the Athenaeum. Harris used an "Electric machine" for a thunder cloud and a tub of water for the sea, then with "a toy for a line of battle ship he showed the whole process of it being struck by lightning & most satisfactorily proved how completely his plan protects the vessel from any bad consequences. This plan consists in having plates of Copper folding over each other, let in the masts & yards & so connected to the water beneath. — The principle, from which these advantages are derived, owes its utility, to the fact that the Electric fluid is weakened by being transmitted over a large surface to such an extent that no effects are perceived, even when the mast is struck by the lightning. — The Beagle is fitted with conductors on this plan; it is very probable, we shall be the means of trying & I hope proving the utility of its effects."

The voyage took almost five years, and although the Beagle was frequently exposed to lightning and was thought to have been struck by lightning on at least two occasions, "when—at the instant of a vivid flash of lightning, accompanied by a crashing peal of thunder—a hissing sound was heard on the masts; and a strange, though very slightly tremulous, motion in the ship indicated that something unusual had happened", there was never the "slightest damage". Darwin himself reported this effect, and his conviction that "but for the conductor, the results would have been serious." FitzRoy reported that the copper plates stayed firmly in place, even in small spars, and strengthened the spars rather than weakening them. FitzRoy gave the lightning protection high praise:

No objection which appears to me valid, has yet been raised against them; and were I allowed to choose between having masts so fitted and the contrary, I should not have the slightest hesitation in deciding on those with Mr. Harris's conductors.

Whether they might be farther improved, as to position and other details, is for their ingenious inventor to consider and determine. He has already devoted so many years of valuable time and attention to the very important subject of defending ships against the stroke of electricity; and has succeeded so well for the benefit of others—at great inconvenience and expense to himself—that it is earnestly to be hoped that the Government, on behalf of this great maritime country, will, at the least, indemnify him for time employed and private funds expended in a public service of so useful and necessary a character.

— FitzRoy, 1839.

=== Naval adoption of the Harris conductors ===
Harris continued his extensive campaign to publicise the extent of the problem of lightning damage. He presented a report listing the damage caused to British naval vessels during the period from 1793 to 1838, including lightning causing 62 deaths and 114 injuries. Two study committees gave favourable recommendations for his system, but full implementation continued to be blocked by the opposition of the First Sea Lord until a change of government led to him being replaced by a new First Sea Lord late in 1841. In June 1842 the Royal Navy at last adopted the Harris conductors. By then the Imperial Russian Navy had already adopted Harris's invention, and in 1845 the Tsar presented him with a valuable ring and vase, in acknowledgment of his services.

Harris continued to record the effects of lightning on ships of the Royal Navy, and published details of this research. In 1853 a report in The Nautical Magazine proudly stated that between 1830 and 1846 none of the ships protected by Harris conductors had suffered casualties from lightning, and they had not been struck by lightning to nearly the extent that unprotected ships had been. Taking a comparable period, at least 45 unprotected ships had been terribly damaged by lightning. It reflected on the boldness of leading the conductors down through the ship past crowded areas and combustible materials, and the prejudices the scheme had to overcome. It noted that the measure was founded on sound principles of science, and had been backed by eminent scientists including Sir Humphry Davy. Recalling the earlier opposition to Harris's proposals, it concluded with "feelings of satisfaction approaching to exultation at the complete success which has crowned his exertions".

== Selected books ==
- Rudimentary Electricity, being a Concise Exposition of the General Principles of Electrical Science. Published by John Weale, 59 High Holborn, London in 1848.

Second edition (1851)
