= Wilson Lowry =

English engraver (1762–1824)

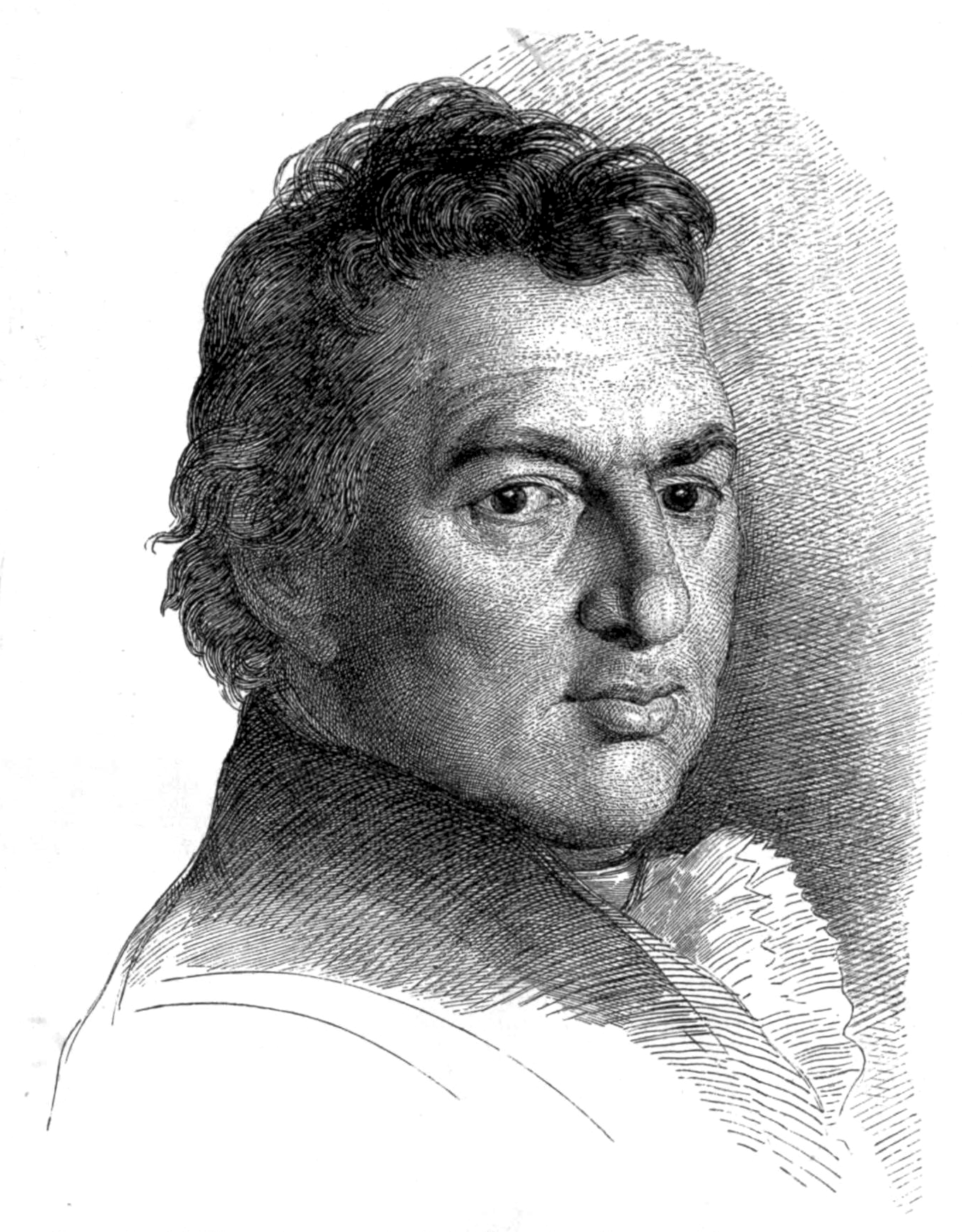
Portrait of Lowry by John Linnell (painter). Engraved by Blake and Linnell.

Wilson Lowry FRS (24 January 1762 – 23 June 1824) was an English engraver.

== Life ==
He was born at Whitehaven, Cumberland, the son of Strickland Lowry, a portrait painter. The family settled in Worcester, and Wilson Lowry, as a boy, left home to work as a house painter in London and Arundel, Sussex. On returning home is received some instruction in engraving from a local craftsman.

He went to London at the age of 18 with an introduction to the print seller John Boydell, who gave him work and introduced him to William Blizard, the surgeon. Blizard encouraged Lowry to become a surgeon and for four years he undertook training, but abandoned it.

Lowry studied under John Browne, the landscape engraver and also received training at the Royal Academy Schools. Lowry developed a number of special instruments to assist his work: about 1790 he devised a ruling machine; in 1801 a device for generating elliptical curves; in 1806 another for making perspective drawings. Lowry was the first engraver to use diamond points and to discover the composition of a corrosive fluid for biting the lines into steel plates.

Lowry specialised in making engraving of architectural and mechanical topics, and excelled in perspective views of machinery. His work appears in Tilloch's Philosophical Magazine, and the Journal of the Society of Arts, Wilkins's Magna Graecia (1807), and Vitruvius (1812), Peter Nicholson's Principles of Architecture (1795–98), and Architectural Dictionary (1819), George Crabb's Technological Dictionary (1823), and the Encyclopædia Metropolitana. Lowry's most famous work in this field was undoubtedly the work he did for Rees's Cyclopædia between 1802 and 1819, including contributing articles, but did work for other encyclopaedias including Pantologia and the British Encyclopedia, or Dictionary of Arts and Sciences.

Lowry was a founder member of the Geological Society and was elected a Fellow of the Royal Society in 1812. He died at his residence, Great Titchfield Street, London.

== Family ==
He married firstly a Miss Porter: they had two daughters, one of whom, Matilda, (who became Mrs Hemming) was a portrait painter. He married secondly mineralogist Rebecca (1761–1848), daughter of Abraham Delvalle, of a Sephardic Jewish family of "small but prosperous" snuff and tobacco merchants settled in England and which had gained British citizenship, and sister of Abigail Delvalle, mother of the economist David Ricardo. They had a son Joseph Wilson Lowry and a daughter Delvalle Lowry, who married John Varley the landscape painter.
