= Samuel Prout =

English painter (1783–1852)

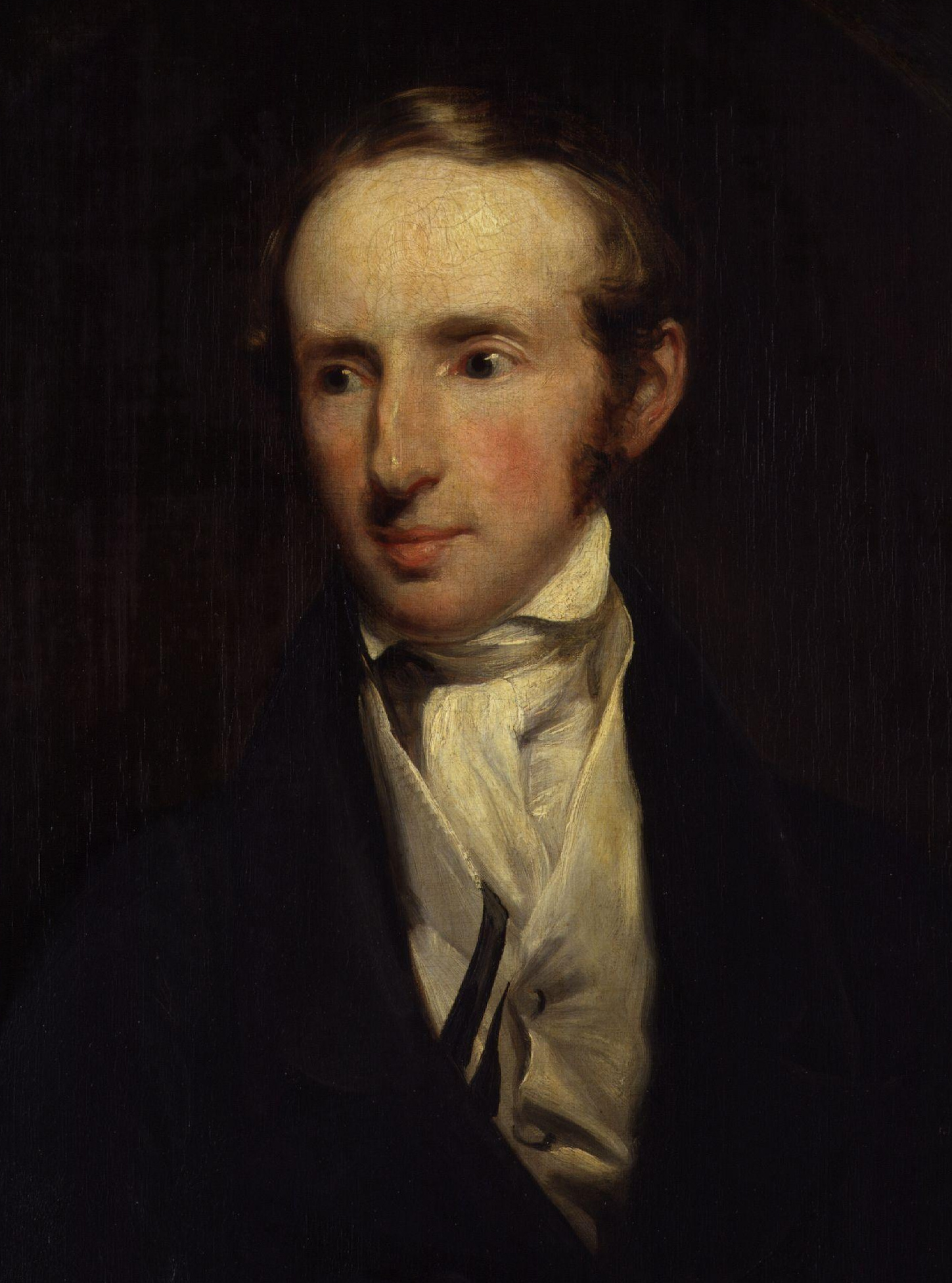
Samuel Prout by John Jackson, 1831 (detail)

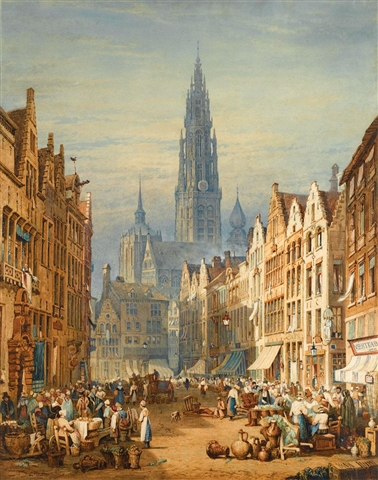
Market in Antwerp, 1823

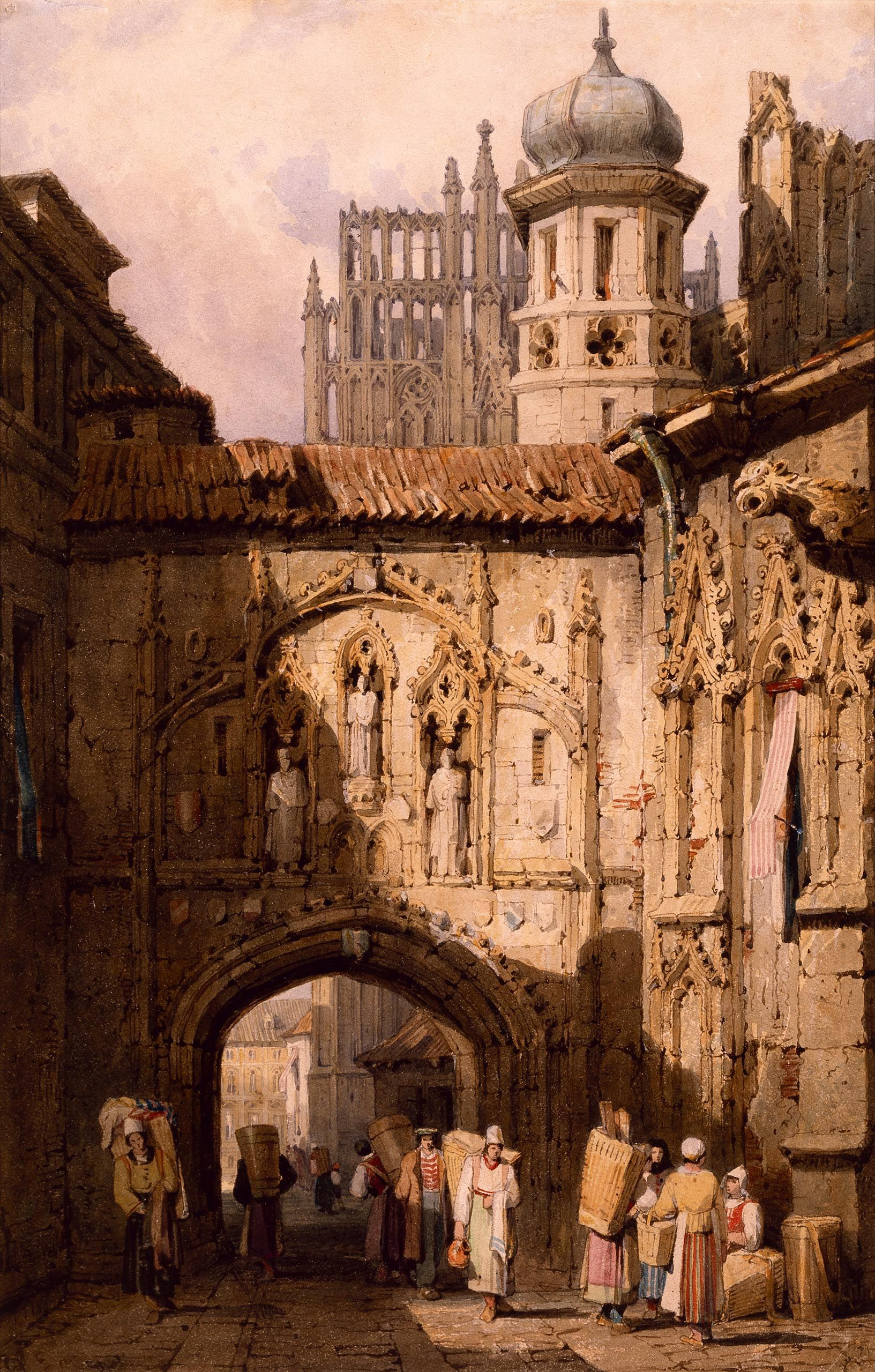
A View in Nuremberg

Samuel Prout (/praʊt/; 17 September 1783 – 10 February 1852) was a British watercolourist, and one of the masters of watercolour architectural painting, who largely invented the genre of the grand street scene in British watercolour painting, mostly with picturesque scenes from continental cities. Prout secured the position of Painter in Water-Colours in Ordinary to King George IV in 1829 and afterwards to Queen Victoria. John Ruskin, whose work often emulated Prout's, wrote in 1844, "Sometimes I tire of Turner, but never of Prout". Prout is often compared to his contemporaries: Turner, Constable and Ruskin, whom he taught. He was the uncle of the artist John Skinner Prout.

== Biography ==
Samuel Prout was born at Plymouth, the fourth of fourteen children born to Samuel Prout Senior, a naval outfitter in the dockyard city, and Mary Cater. Attending Plymouth Grammar School, he came under the influence of its schoolmaster, John Bidlake, who encouraged the young Prout and Benjamin Robert Haydon in their artistic apprenticeship. They spent whole summer days drawing the quiet cottages, rustic bridges and romantic watermills of the beautiful valleys of Devon. With John Britton, he made a journey through Cornwall to try his hand in furnishing sketches for Britton's Beauties of England. In 1803, he moved to London, where he stayed until 1812. Marrying Elizabeth Gillespie in 1810, they had four children; Rebecca Elizabeth (b. 1813), Elizabeth Delsey (b. 1817), Isabella Anne (b. 1820), and Samuel Gillespie (b. 1822).

In London, Prout saw new possibilities, and endeavoured to correct and improve his style by studying the works of the rising school of landscape. To earn a living, he painted marine pieces for Palser the printseller, took students, and published drawing books for learners. He was one of the first to use lithography.

Around 1818, Prout made his first visit to continental Europe. During the trip, he studied the streets, marketplaces, and architecture of European cities, which became recurring subjects in his work. His drawings frequently depicted historic buildings and cathedrals.

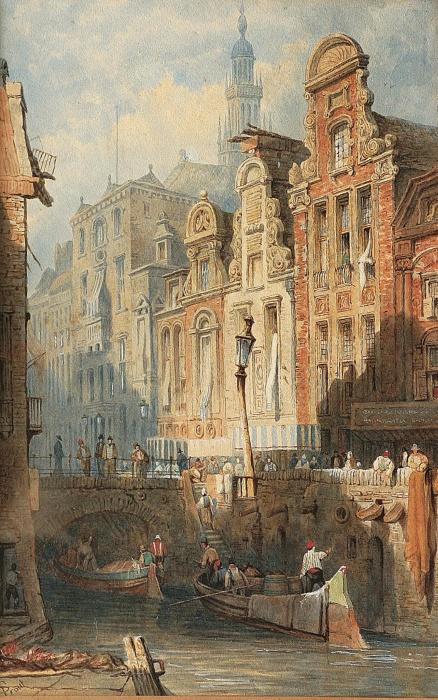
Utrecht Town Hall, 1841

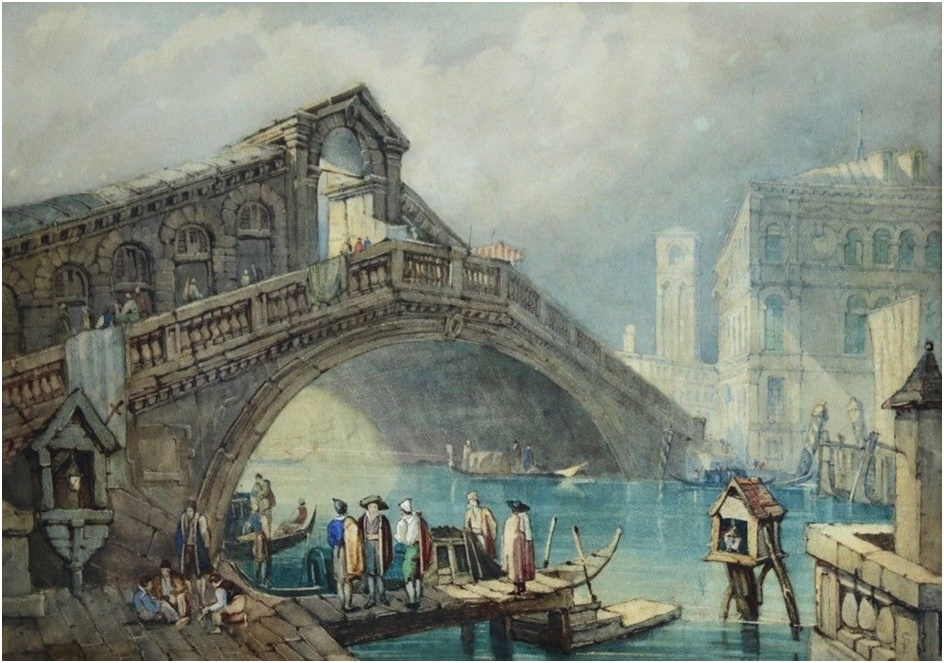
The Rialto Bridge, Venice

He established his reputation with these street scenes, and gained praise from his erstwhile student John Ruskin. Until Prout, says Ruskin, excessive and clumsy artificiality characterized the picturesque: what ruins early artists drew "looked as if broken down on purpose; what weeds they put on seemed put on for ornament". To Prout, therefore, goes credit for the creation of the essential characteristics lacking in earlier art, in particular "that feeling which results from the influence, among the noble lines of architecture, of the rent and the rust, the fissure, the lichen, and the weed, and from the writings upon the pages of ancient walls of the confused hieroglyphics of human history". Prout, in other words, does not unfeelingly depict signs of age and decay chiefly for the sake of interesting textures, but rather employs these textures and other characteristics of the picturesque to create deeply felt impressions of age nobly endured. Though they are often compared, neither Turner nor Prout were vulgar artists, and while Turner concentrated upon the infinite beauties of nature, Prout was more interested by the cityscape.

Prout was appointed the coveted title of 'Painter in Water-Colours in Ordinary' to King George IV in 1829, and afterwards to Queen Victoria.

At the time of his death there was hardly a place in France, Germany, Italy (especially Venice) or the Netherlands where his face had not been seen searching for antique gables and sculptured pieces of stone. He died after a stroke at his home, 5 De Crespigny Terrace, Denmark Hill, London and was buried at West Norwood Cemetery.

A large quantity of his original sketchbooks, lithographs, account books, letters and family materials was held at the North Devon Athenaeum, Barnstaple, Devon. The collection was sold at auction in 2010, and much was acquired by Plymouth City Museum & Art Gallery, adding to its existing holdings of his work.

Samuel Gillespie Prout followed in his father's footsteps by also painting watercolours. His nephew was the composer Ebenezer Prout. Another member of the family, John Skinner Prout made a career for himself painting and writing books in Tasmania.
