= Philip Rogers (businessman) =

British businessman

Sir Philip Rogers, CBE, (19 September 1908 – 16 April 1994) was a British businessman closely associated with Nigeria and Kenya, in both countries making valuable contributions to their progress towards independence. Rogers was appointed Commander of the Order of the British Empire (CBE) in 1952 for his services to Nigeria and was knighted in 1961.

== Early life and career ==
Rogers was educated at Blundell's School in Tiverton before joining British American Tobacco.

His later positions included:

- President, Nigeria Chamber of Commerce, 1948 and 1950;
- Chairman, East African Tobacco Co Ltd, 1951–63;
- Chairman, Rift Valley Cigarette Co Ltd, 1956–63;
- President, Nairobi Chamber of Commerce, 1957;
- Chairman, Governing Council, Royal Technical College of East Africa 1958-60 (and served on the board of governors of the College of Social Studies, and was a founder of the University of Kenya);
- Chairman, Tobacco Research Council.

== Wartime service ==
During the Second World War, Rogers served with the Royal West African Frontier Force and Intelligence Corps.

== Sources ==
- Obituary of Sir Philip Rogers, The Independent, 21 April 1994
