= Joseph Wilson Lowry =

British engraver (1803–1879)

Joseph Wilson Lowry (1803–1879) was a British engraver.

He was the son of Wilson Lowry and his second wife Rebecca Delvalle and was born on 7 October 1803. His mother's sister, Abigail, was mother of the economist David Ricardo. He was trained by his father and from both parents inherited a taste for science and mathematics; in his work he specialised in scientific subjects. He died, unmarried, at his residence, 39 Robert Street, Hampstead Road, London, on 15 June 1879.

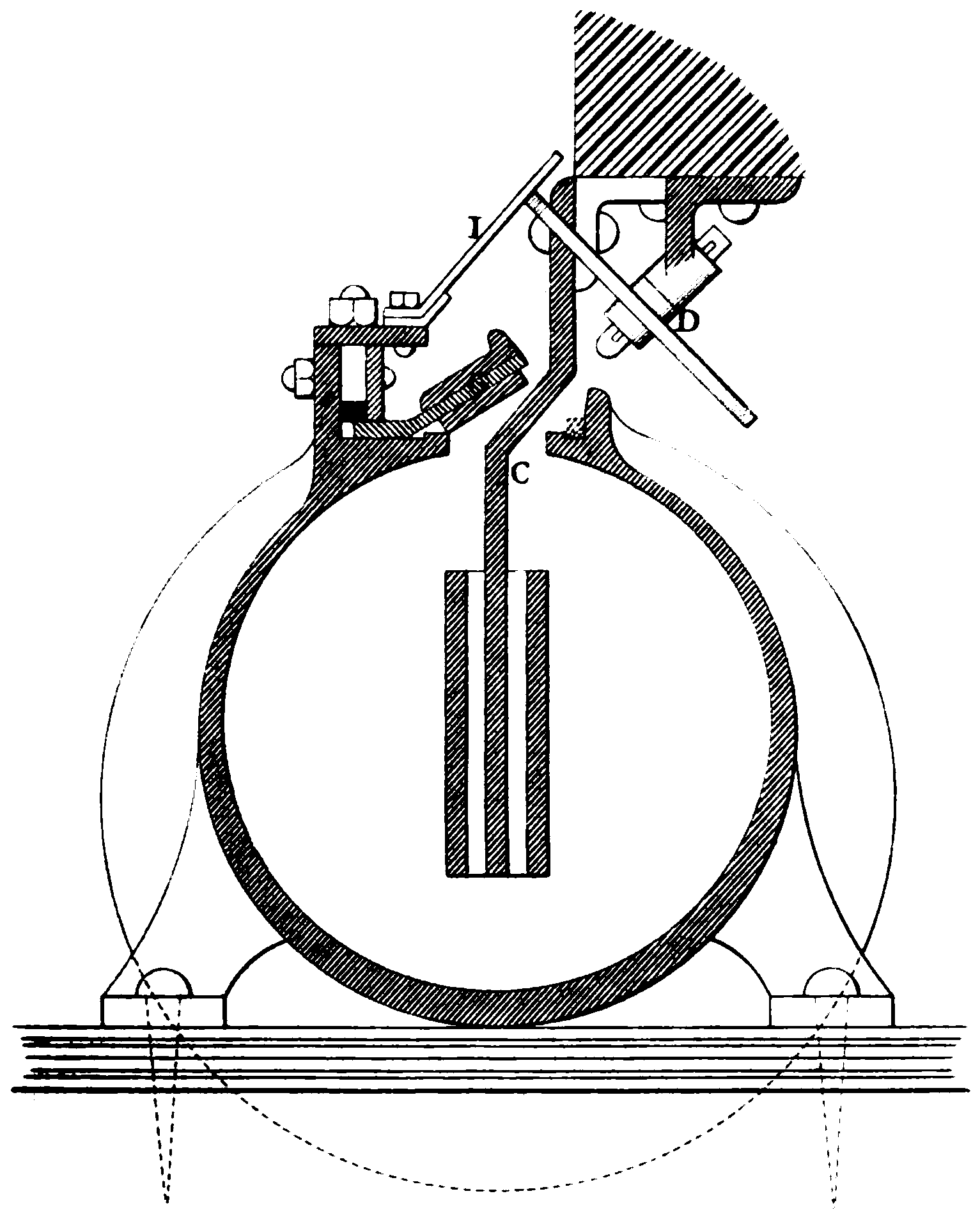
Drawing from a description of the atmospheric railway of Samuel Clegg and Joseph Samuda.

He engraved plates for the Encyclopædia Metropolitana and for Sir John Rennie a series of drawings for London Bridge. Other work included John Phillips's Geology of Yorkshire, 1835 and Scott Russell's Naval Architecture, 1865, John Weale's 'Scientific Series' and the journals of the Institution of Naval Architects and the Royal Geographical Society. He later was appointed engraver to the Geological Survey of Great Britain and Ireland, as can be seen on their Horizontal and Vertical Sections.
