= Mike Dickison =

New Zealand Wikipedian, zoologist, and museum curator (born 1968 or 1969)

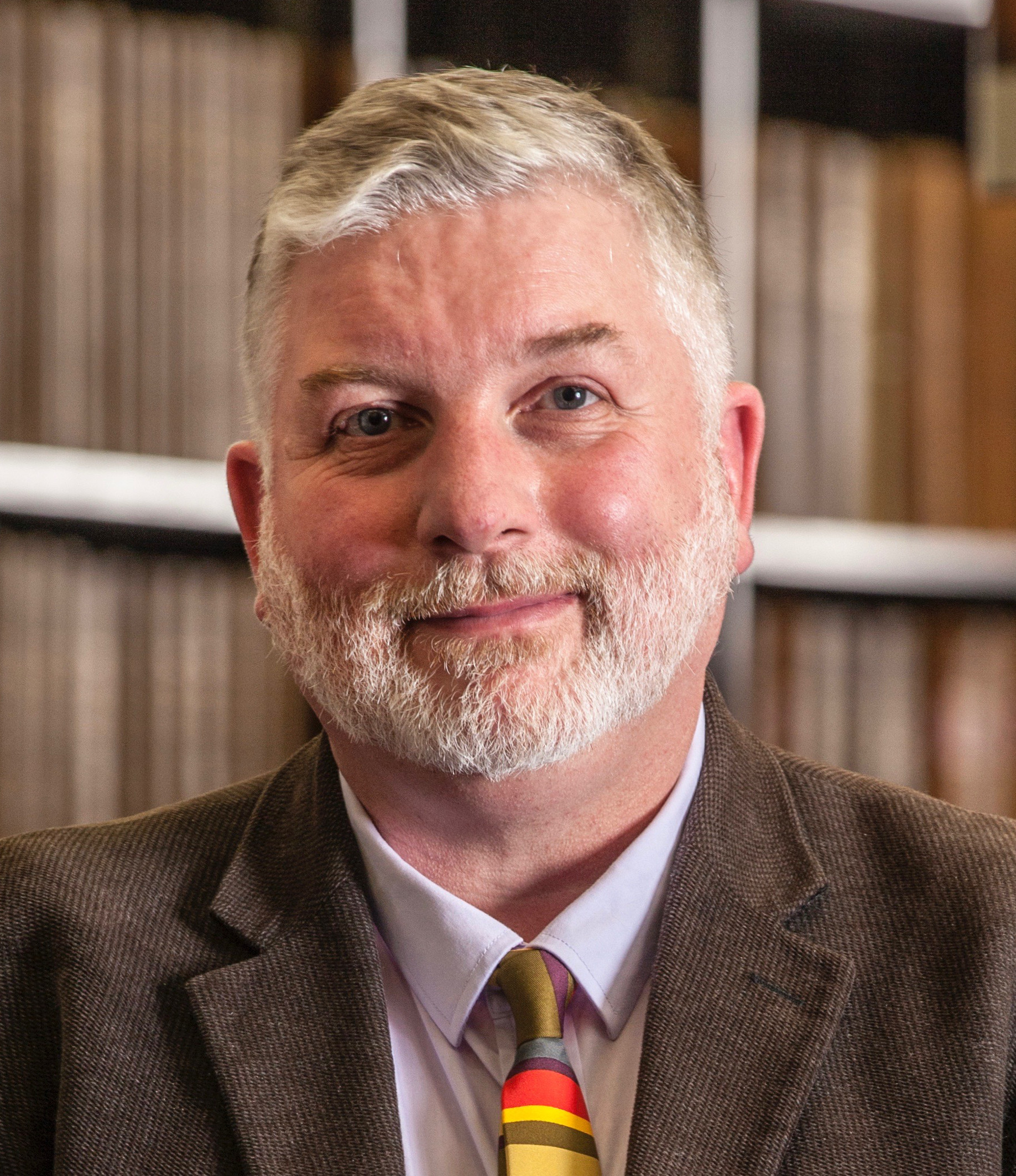
- Dickison in 2018
- Born: 1968 or 1969 (age 57–58); Christchurch, New Zealand
- Education: Duke University (PhD)
- Occupations: Museum curator, zoologist, Wikipedian at Large
- Scientific career
- Thesis: The allometry of giant flightless birds (2007)
- Doctoral advisor: Louise Roth

Michael R. Dickison (born 1968 or 1969) is a New Zealand museum curator, zoologist and Wikipedia editor. He was New Zealand's first Wikipedian at Large, in 2018–19, receiving a grant from the Wikimedia Foundation.

== Early life ==
Dickison grew up in Christchurch. His father was an apprentice boilermaker, and his mother was a homemaker. His father encouraged his interest in curating and collecting.

Dickison gained a PhD in zoology from Duke University in 2007. His dissertation subject was the allometry of giant flightless birds.

== Career ==
Dickison was curator of natural history at the Whanganui Regional Museum from 2013 to 2018. In 2015, he led an effort to mount the museum's collection of more than 2000 bones and 10 articulated moa skeletons.

He became interested in Wikipedia in 2009. In 2012, he created a community group "Whanganui Wiki Wednesday" which met once a month to edit local pages on Wikipedia. He then started running Wikipedia workshops around New Zealand.

He has advocated for museums to engage with Wikipedia to get their collections accessible to the public. He argues that Wikipedia can also be a powerful tool for governments to share information and doing public outreach, citing the example of kauri dieback.

In 2019, Dickison was a judge for the Voyager Media Awards.

=== Wikipedian at Large 2018 ===
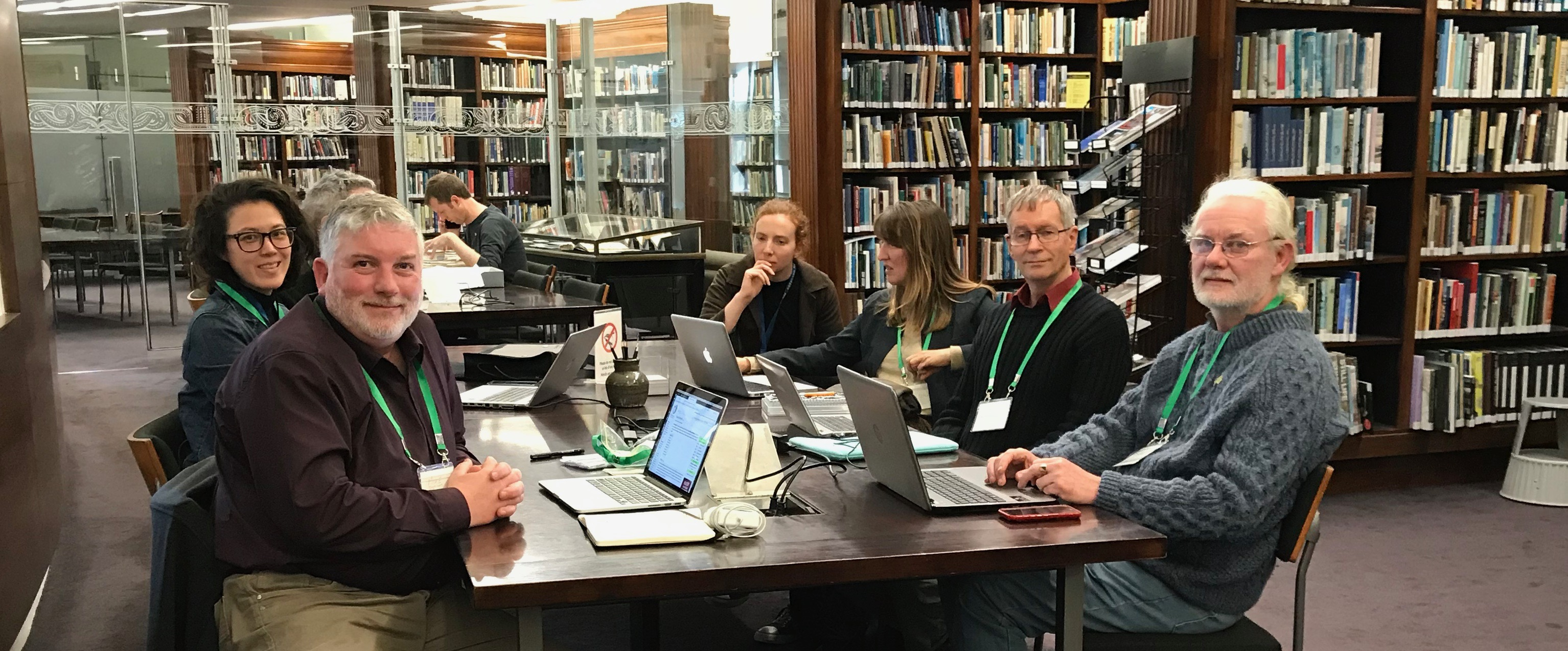
Dickison (front, left) leading a Wikipedia edit-a-thon at Auckland Museum, July 2018.

In 2018, Dickison received a $61,000 grant from the Wikimedia Foundation to become New Zealand's first Wikipedian-at-Large. The grant paid his salary, travel costs, and conference registration fees. The aim of the project was to address the gaps in New Zealand-related content on Wikipedia, such as the lack of articles on Māori and women. He also hoped to attract more female editors to Wikipedia to address the gender bias of article topics. During 2018, he travelled around New Zealand in his 4WD, which acted as a mobile office and entomology field station.

In July 2018, his first stop was Auckland Museum. He went on to extended working stops, presentations and events at multiple institutions, in 16 different towns and cities across New Zealand, working with staff and the public. He recorded Māori language pronunciations to add to Wikipedia articles, and called for locals to share their stories.

== Critter of the Week ==
Dickison presented about the Critter of the Week radio programme in Bali, Indonesia at ESEAP 2018. An updated presentation was given at the Wikimedia Australia Melbourne meetup in November 2018. Critter of the Week was discussed as an example of a museum outreach at the 2018 SPNHC conference in Dunedin.

== See also ==
- List of Wikipedia people
