= Critter of the Week =

New Zealand radio programme

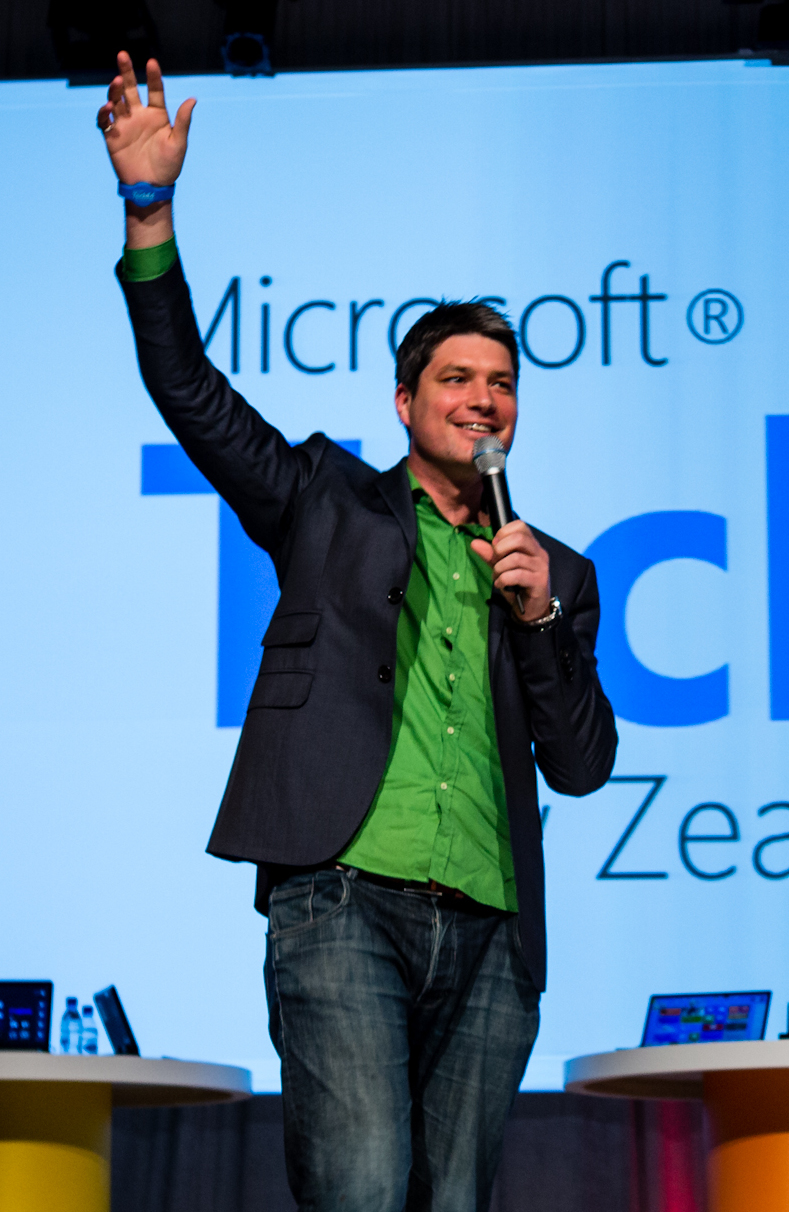
Jesse Mulligan

Critter of the Week is a weekly RNZ National programme about endangered and neglected native plants and animals of New Zealand. The show aims to raise awareness of often overlooked native critters, while raising funds for conservation efforts via Critter Of the Week Merch alongside Joyya, an ethical merchandise manufacturer that empowers communities facing extreme poverty and modern slavery.

Beginning in 2015, Critter of the Week is an approximately 15-minute discussion between Nicola Toki (originally the Department of Conservation Threatened Species Ambassador) and RNZ Afternoons host Jesse Mulligan on an "uncharismatic and lovable" New Zealand species. Despite its name, the show features animals, plants, and fungi, with each species receiving an "attractiveness" score from 1 to 10. The show currently airs on Friday afternoons, and has a regular listenership of 100,000.

== Origin and development ==
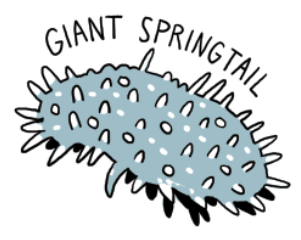
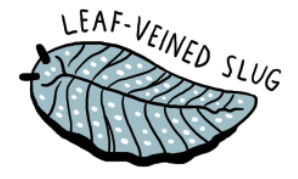
Giselle Clarkson illustrations

The topic of spotlighting uncharismatic species was raised in an interview by Mulligan in April 2015, and the programme originated later in 2015 in a discussion between Mulligan and Toki about threatened bird conservation, in which Toki lamented a lack of attention and corporate funding for species such as the Smeagol gravel slug. The first episode of Critter of the Week aired on 2 October 2015 and featured the New Zealand bat fly. Each week's broadcast is supported by a team of volunteers, referred to by Mulligan as the "wikinerds", who improve the Wikipedia article for the species in question.

In 2018 and in subsequent years artist Giselle Clarkson designed t-shirts, hoodies and totes featuring a selection of species that had appeared on the programme. In September–October 2018, a "Critter of the Week: Bake-off" competition invited listeners to bake a cake in the shape of their favourite "critter". Listeners have also taken part in a "Knit-a-Critter" competition.

Nicola Toki became chief executive of Forest & Bird in April 2022, but continued with the RNZ weekly programme.

== Coverage ==
The Critter of the Week project was the subject of a lightning talk by Mike Dickison for the 2018 ESEAP Conference in Bali, Indonesia. An updated presentation was given at the Wikimedia Australia Melbourne meetup in November 2018. Critter of the Week was discussed as an example of a museum outreach at the 2018 SPNHC conference in Dunedin. Critter of the Week and the role of Wikipedia editors was featured in Forest & Bird magazine in June 2023.
