= Natural Sciences Collections Association =

- Formation: April 2003 from merger of the Biological Curator's Group (founded 1975) and Natural Sciences Conservation Group (founded 1995)
- Type: Learned society
- Purpose: Natural history collections care and use
- Location(s): United Kingdom and Republic of Ireland
- Members: circa 250
- Activities: Research & publications, training & events
- Website: natsca.org

The Natural Sciences Collections Association (NatSCA) is a United Kingdom based membership organisation and charitable organization (No.1098156) run by volunteers from the membership. NatSCA's mission is "to promote and support natural science collections, the institutions that house them and the people that work with them, in order to improve collections care, understanding, accessibility and enjoyment for all." The subject specialist network promotes research and exchange of ideas, advances in technical and ethical standards, and raises the public profile of the conservation and preservation of natural science collections and objects.

The organisation describes their focus as:

- Community – developing an open, friendly and accessible network for sharing information, experience and skills.
- Support – facilitating the professional development of stakeholders in natural science collections.
- Standards – identifying and promoting good quality practice in the care and use of natural science collections.
- Promoting collections – increasing awareness of the scientific and cultural value of natural science collections.
- Advocacy – challenging neglect of collections and lobbying for the appropriate resourcing of collections for their care and sustainable use.

== History ==
The Natural Sciences Collections Association was founded in April 2003 from the merger of Natural Sciences Conservation Group (NCSG) and Biological Curator's Group (BCG) at a meeting in the Manchester Museum on 7 April 2003. The organisation has a Memorandum of Understanding with the Geological Curators' Group and Society for the Preservation of Natural History Collections.

On 14 May 2020 Isla Gladstone (based at Bristol City Museum and Art Gallery) was elected chair, replacing Paolo Viscardi (based at the National Museum of Ireland – Natural History) who was chair for two terms since June 2014.

== Patrons ==
In 2013, the charity announced Alice Roberts, Iain Stewart and Ben Garrod as patrons.

== Publications ==
The Natural Sciences Collections Association publishes an annual peer-reviewed academic journal, the Journal of Natural Science Collections as well as occasional papers under the title of Notes & Comments and a blog. Previous publications include NatSCA News.
