= Geological Collections Group =

- Abbreviation: GCG
- Formation: 1974
- Vision: Geological collections thriving for science and society
- Blog: geocollnews.wordpress.com
- Current Committee: geocurator.org/committee
- Publication: Geological Curator
- Affiliations: Geological Society of London
- Website: geocurator.org
- Formerly called: Geological Curators' Group

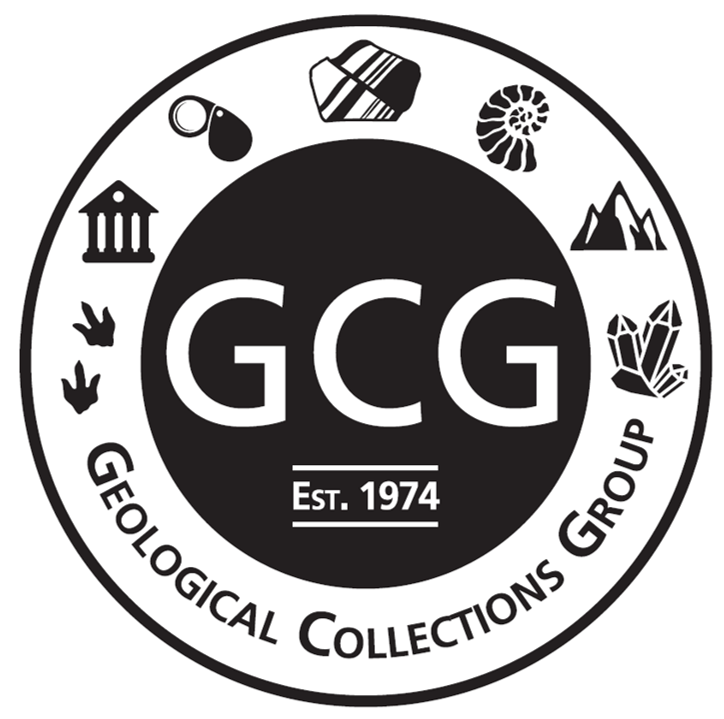
The Geological Collections Group logo, updated 17th May 2024, to commemorate GCG's 50th anniversary.

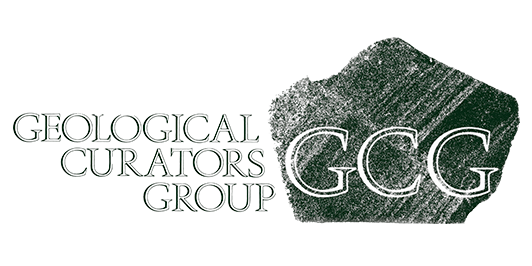
The Geological Curators' Group logo, which represented the organisation prior to its rebranding as the Geological Collections Group in 2024.

The Geological Collections Group (GCG), formerly the Geological Curators' Group, is a charity registered in England and Wales (no. 1198339) and a membership organisation. GCG's mission is, "to connect every geological collection with appropriate resources, knowledge and skills to thrive and positively impact science and society." The organisation does this by: "supporting everyone working with and caring for geological collections of all types; advocating the value of expertise in the care and use of geological collections, and their importance for scientific research and education; and connecting people, skills, information, and collections."

GCG is recognised by the Arts Council as one of 37 organisations in the Subject Specialist Network (SSN) Programme that support, "the development of knowledge and expertise associated with specialist collections and their contribution to public engagement, education and enjoyment". The GCG is affiliated to the Geological Society of London as a specialist group, and it shares a Memorandum of Understanding with the Natural Sciences Collections Association SSN (NatSCA) and the Society for the Preservation of Natural History Collections (SPNHC).

Membership of the Geological Collections Group is open to anyone interested in geology, and will be of particular interest to any individuals or organisations responsible for the care of geological collections, the interpretation or promotion of geological specimens or sites, as well as students, conservators, historians of geology, volunteers, collectors or preparators.

== History of GCG ==
GCG was originally given a working name of The Association of Museum Geologists, until the Geological Society suggested a name-change. An exploratory meeting in the Museum Council Room in Leicester on 15 February 1974 saw over 30 curators gather to discuss the concept, agree a draft constitution, and form a working party headed by Roy Clements and Mike Jones. The inaugural GCG meeting was held on 17 May 1974 at the Geological Society’s rooms in Burlington House, London with 55 people in attendance.

In May 2024, GCG celebrated its 50th anniversary and commemorated this milestone by unveiling a newly designed logo to modernise the brand's appearance.

In November 2024, the Geological Curators' Group adopted a new name: the Geological Collections Group. Retaining the acronym GCG, the updated name was chosen to better reflect and include the diverse community of individuals who work with or volunteer in geological collections.

== Geological Curator ==
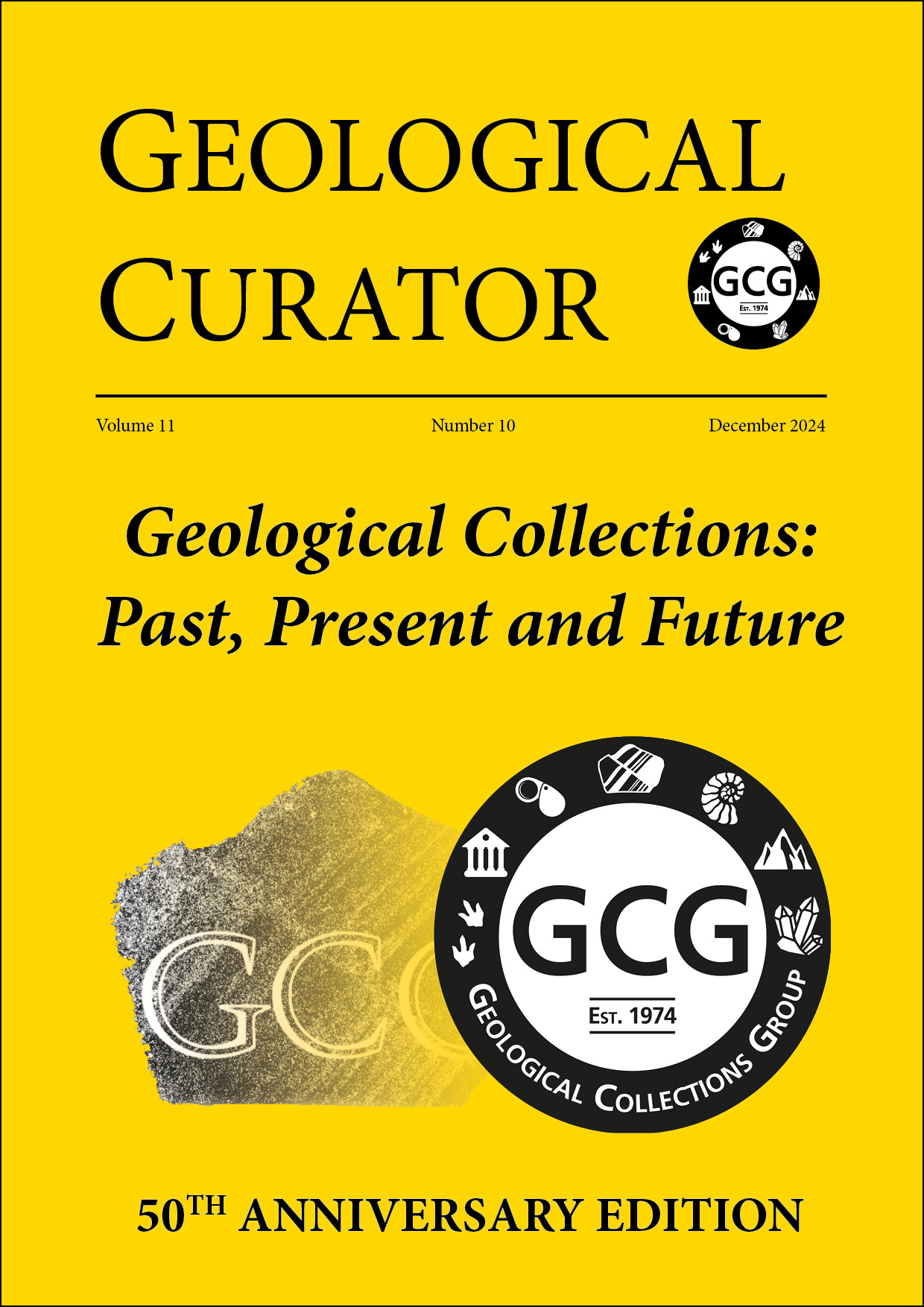
GCG's Geological Curator (Vol. 11, No. 10; Geological Collections - Past, Present and Future).

The Geological Collections Group publishes an annual academic journal, called Geological Curator, which is made available online to GCG members. The journal started life as the Newsletter of the Geological Curators’ Group, and was first published in September 1974, edited by Brian Page.

The journal now publishes peer-reviewed articles on hypothesis-driven studies which contribute novel results and/or perspectives of relevance to the care and management of geological collections and their use in teaching and engagement. Geological Curator is available in both electronic and print format, and the two most recent issues can only be accessed by current members; however issues older than two years are made freely available via GCG's website.

The upcoming Spring 2025 issue of Geological Curator will be a special edition of the journal, titled "Moving towards equitable Geoscience Collections". The purpose of this issue is to consolidate current research and initiatives that aim to improve the environment, accessibility, and future of geological collections.

== Blog and Coprolite Newsletter ==
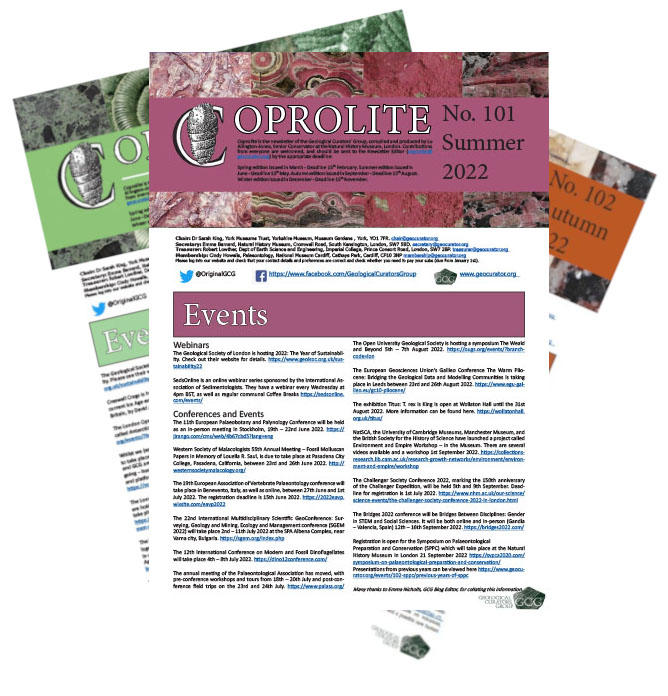
GCG’s long-running quarterly newsletter Coprolite.

The GCG blog was originally set up to highlight examples of how geological collections are used via ‘six questions for a geological curator’. This was intended as positive evidence to support why collections should be maintained at a time of austerity. The blog has now been expanded not only to advocate for collections, but as a space for informal sharing of information for everyone who works with or is interested in geological collections.

Coprolite is the GCG’s long-running quarterly newsletter, aptly named after fossilised animal faeces. It is distributed digitally to all members and typically features upcoming events, exhibition reviews, and updates from the committee. All past issues of Coprolite, from the very first edition in February 1990 to the 100th issue, are available to read and download on the GCG website ("Coprolite Newsletter Archive". Geological Curators' Group.).

== Events and Projects ==
The Geological Collections Group holds a number of workshops each year, either independently or in collaboration with partner organisations. Most recent events and workshops include: Dinosaur Trackways Field Workshop 2025, in partnership with Oxford University Museum of Natural History; EDI Symposium 2025; Digital Morphology Workshop 2025, in partnership with University of Leeds; and the Symposium on Toarcian Palaeobiology ("Past Workshops and Seminars". Geological Curators' Group.).

GCG was also one of six organisations that contributed to the GB3D Type Fossils Online Project, funded by Jisc, which aimed to create, "a single database of the type specimens, held in British collections, of macrofossil species and subspecies found in the UK, including links to photographs (including 'anaglyph' stereo pairs) and a selection of 3D digital models."
