= Ned (snail) =

Garden snail with a left-coiled shell (died 2026)

- Ned (below) next to another snail, with a right-coiled shell
- Species: Cornu aspersum
- Breed: Sinistral
- Sex: Hermaphrodite
- Hatched: Wairarapa, New Zealand
- Died: 15 April 2026
- Owner: Giselle Clarkson
- Residence: Wairarapa, New Zealand
- Appearance: Left-coiled
- Named after: Ned Flanders

Ned (died 15 April 2026) was a garden snail with a left-coiled (sinistral) shell found in New Zealand. Discovered by author and artist Giselle Clarkson in her garden, Ned received international attention due to the rarity of its mutation.

== Discovery ==
Ned was discovered in the garden of conservation cartoonist Giselle Clarkson in the Wairarapa, New Zealand, in August 2025, while she was weeding. Clarkson had previously written the nature book The Observologist and had been looking for a snail with a left-coiled (sinistral) shell. Most snail shells spiral to the right, but one in 40,000 snails has a shell that spirals to the left. This prevents the snail from reproducing, as the position of the snail's sex organs is reversed relative to other normal snails.

Ned was named after Ned Flanders, a character in The Simpsons who, beginning the episode "When Flanders Failed", owns a store for left-handed people called "The Leftorium".

== Breeding and care ==
After the discovery, Clarkson placed Ned in a fish bowl with a companion snail and fed it broccoli and silver beet. She then contacted the New Zealand Geographic, who began a campaign to find a compatible snail for Ned to mate with. The snail then received international media attention, including from CNN, The Washington Post and BBC News, but it was unlikely that a mate found overseas would have been allowed into New Zealand due to the country's biosecurity restrictions.

Clarkson also fed Ned cucumber, carrot, and French beans. The snail was particularly fond of the beans.

== Death ==
Ned died on 15 April 2026 inside its pāua-shell sleeping spot.

== See also ==
- Jeremy (snail), another famous snail with a left-spiralling shell that had a campaign to find a mate
