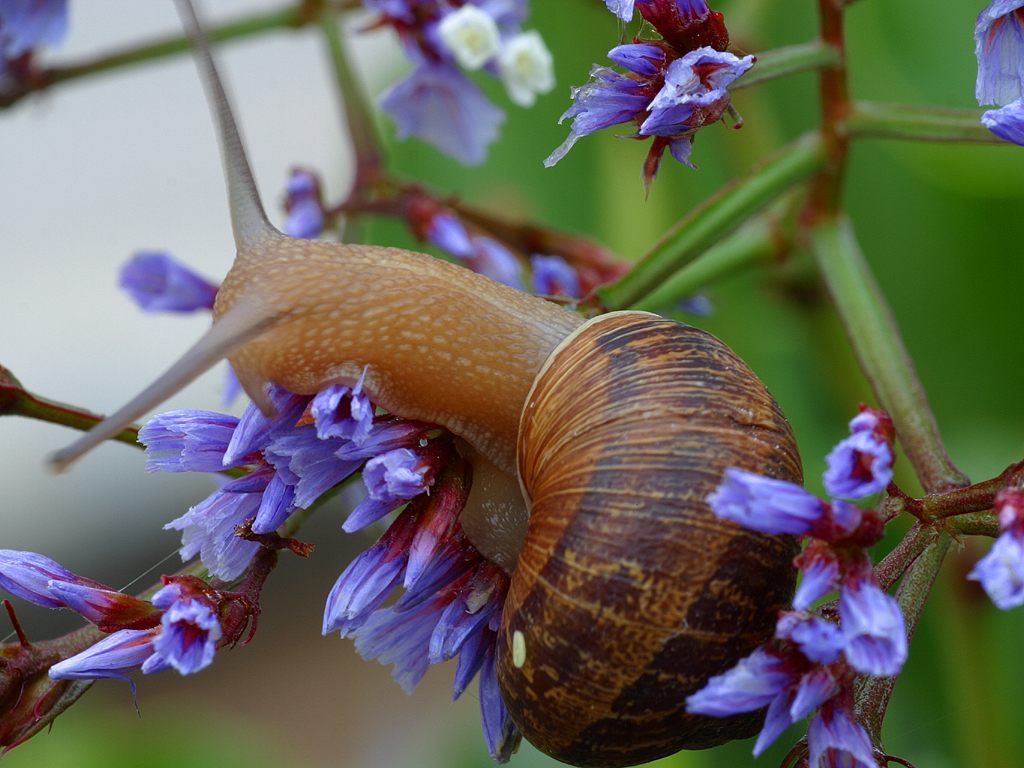
- Garden snail (Cornu aspersum) on Limonium

Scientific classification
- Kingdom: Animalia
- Phylum: Mollusca
- Class: Gastropoda
- Order: Stylommatophora
- Family: Helicidae
- Subfamily: Helicinae
- Tribe: Thebini
- Genus: Cornu; Born, 1778

Species
- Cornu aspersum (O. F. Müller, 1774); Cornu cephalaeditana (Giannuzzi-Savelli, Sparacio & Oliva, 1986); Cornu cretense Hausdorf, Bamberger & Walther, 2020; Cornu insolida (Monterosato, 1892); Cornu mazzullii (De Cristofori & Jan, 1832)

Synonyms
- Cornu (Cornu) Born, 1778; Cornu (Erctella) Monterosato, 1894; Cryptomphalus Charpentier, 1837; Erctella Monterosato, 1894; Helix (Cornu) Born, 1778; Helix (Cryptomphalus) Charpentier, 1837

= Cornu (gastropod) =

Genus of snails

Cornu is a genus of land snails in the family Helicidae.

== Species ==
Species in this genus include, as of 2025:

- Cornu aspersum (O. F. Müller, 1774)
- Cornu cephalaeditana (Giannuzzi-Savelli, Sparacio & Oliva, 1986)
- Cornu cretense Hausdorf, Bamberger & Walther, 2020
- Cornu insolida (Monterosato, 1892)
- Cornu mazzullii (De Cristofori & Jan, 1832)
