= Giselle Clarkson =

New Zealand cartoonist and illustrator

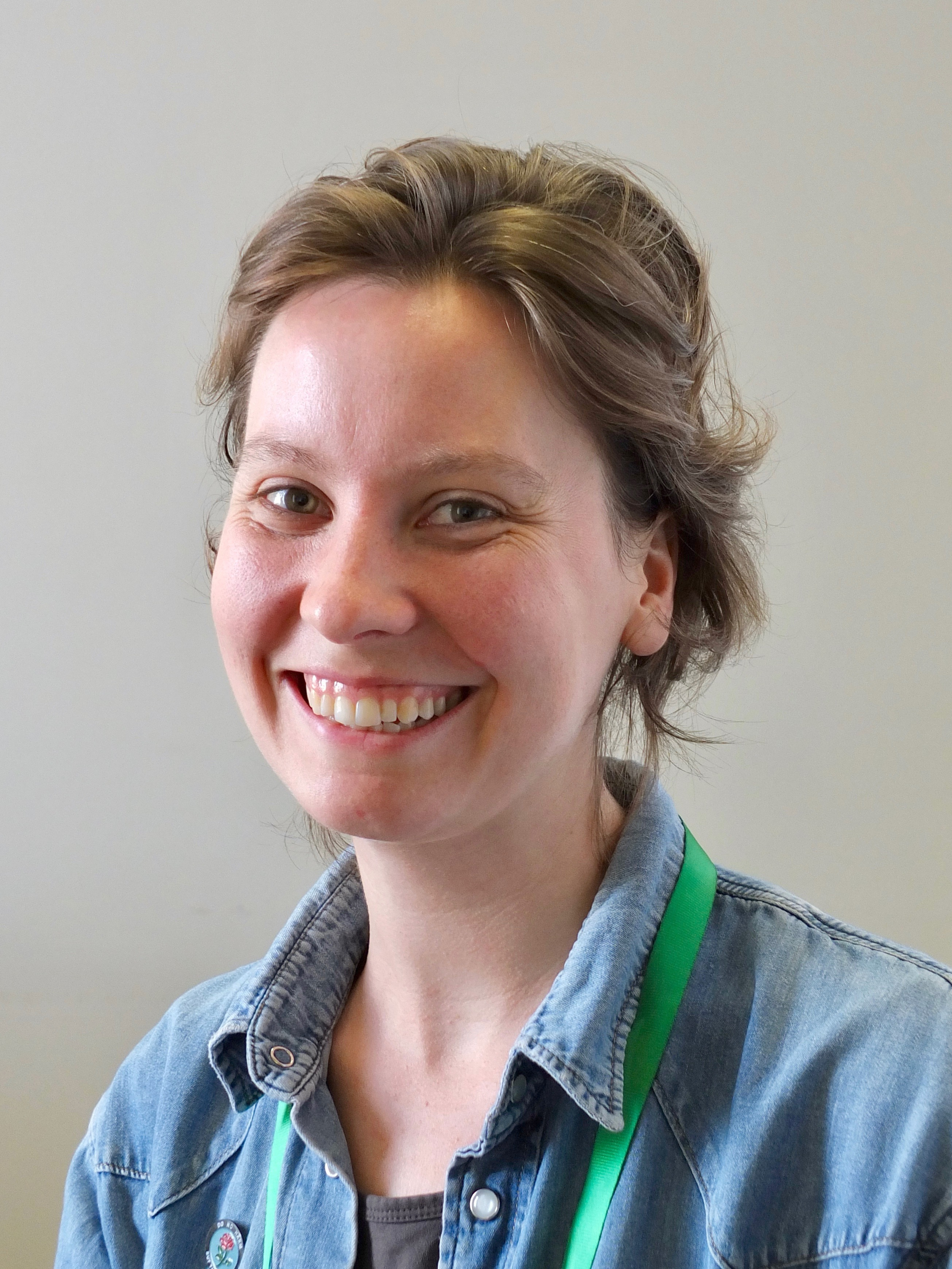
- Clarkson in 2019
- Born: New Zealand
- Areas: Cartoonist; illustrator
- Notable works: Biscuits and Slices of New Zealand
- Awards: Arts Foundation of New Zealand Laureate Award (2023)

Giselle Clarkson is a New Zealand cartoonist and illustrator, best known for her non-fiction comics on conservation and environmental issues.

== Life ==
Clarkson studied for Bachelor of Fine Arts at the University of Canterbury, intending to become a painter but majoring in photography. She works as a freelance illustrator and comics artist, and lives in South Wairarapa, New Zealand.

After graduation she worked in an outdoor equipment shop and volunteered with conservation projects; she was torn between becoming an artist and working for the Department of Conservation. Her entry into illustration was a 2013 poster depicting New Zealand fish. Later illustrations of New Zealand native birds featured on RNZ's Morning Report were distributed through Twitter, which led to commissions from Forest and Bird's children's magazine, the New Zealand School Journal, newspapers, websites, and magazines, and a career in illustration.

== Work ==
Clarkson's first published comic, "The Flood", appeared in the 2016 collection of Aotearoa women's comics Three Words. Her best known work, "Biscuits and Slices of New Zealand", is a visual catalogue of New Zealand baking, with each object given a fanciful Latin name: for example, Anzac biscuit is "Lestwee forgetum". Widely shared in social media, this was published in Annual 2 (2017) and subsequently became a poster and tea towel; Clarkson was interviewed about the success of the comic on TV3's The Project. A follow-up illustration appeared in Annual 3 (2022).

Critter of the Week illustrations
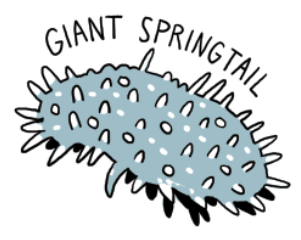
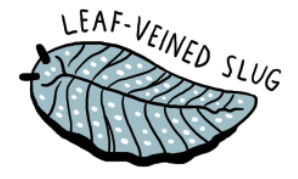

Clarkson has a bimonthly comic in New Zealand children's literature website The Sapling, on children's books and how they influenced her as an illustrator. She frequently undertakes field expeditions as part of her work to places such as the Kermadecs, Milford Sound (to draw penguins) or the Subantarctic Islands (a 19-day sea voyage which led to an 8-page comic in the School Journal). She regularly creates illustration and T-shirts for the Radio New Zealand show Critter of the Week. In 2018 she produced a comics summary of a scientific paper on the migration of the Fiordland penguin or tawaki (Eudyptes pachyrhynchus), which was enthusiastically retweeted by Diana Gabaldon. She has also illustrated a number of children's books published by Gecko Press.

In 2022 Clarkson began illustrating a regular evolutionary-biology column by Kate Evans in New Zealand Geographic magazine. This led to a nomination as Best Artist in the 2023 Voyager Media Awards.

In 2023 her book The Observologist: A Handbook for Mounting Very Small Scientific Expeditions was published. The book was shortlisted for New Zealand Book Awards for Children and Young Adults, Elsie Locke Award for Non-Fiction in 2024.

In 2026 Clarkson's book Omnibird: An Avian Investigator's Handbook was shortlisted for New Zealand Book Awards for Children and Young Adults, Elsie Locke Award for Non-Fiction.

== Honours and awards ==
In 2023, Clarkson received an Arts Foundation of New Zealand Laureate Award. The panel described her work as "always technically impressive and incredibly imaginative; demonstrating huge sensitivity whilst retaining her trademark energy and vibrance."

Clarkson's 2025 book Omnibird: An Avian Investigator's Handbook was named a Storylines Notable Non-Fiction Book for 2025.

== Publications ==
=== Nonfiction writing ===
- —— (2023). The Observologist: A Handbook for Mounting Very Small Scientific Expeditions. Author and illustrator. Gecko Press.
- —— (2025). Omnibird: An Avian Investigator's Handbook. Author and illustrator. Gecko Press.

=== Book contributions as illustrator ===
- Joyce, Rae; Laing, Sarah; Neville, Indira, eds. (2016). Three Words. Illustrations by Giselle Clarkson. Beatnik. ISBN 978-0-9941205-0-2.
- de Goldi, Kate, ed. (2016). Annual. Illustrated by Giselle Clarkson. Gecko Press. ISBN 978-1-77657-077-5.
- de Goldi, Kate, ed. (2017). Annual 2. Illustrated by Giselle Clarkson. Gecko Press. ISBN 978-0-473-39523-0.
- Meredith, Courtney Sina (2018). The Secret World of Butterflies. Illustrations by Giselle Clarkson. Auckland: Allen & Unwin. ISBN 978-1-76063-360-8.
- Blanchard, Nan, ed. (2019). Hazel and the Snails. Illustrated by Giselle Clarkson. Annual Ink. ISBN 978-0-9951135-8-9.
- Cowley, Joy, ed. (2019). The Gobbledegook Book: A Joy Cowley Anthology. Illustrated by Giselle Clarkson. Gecko Press. ISBN 978-1-77657-258-8.
- Tylee, Alexandra, ed. (2020). Egg and Spoon: An Illustrated Cookbook. Illustrated by Giselle Clarkson. Gecko Press. ISBN 978-1-77657-298-4.
- Cowley, Joy, ed. (2021). The Tiny Woman's Coat. Illustrated by Giselle Clarkson. Gecko Press. ISBN 978-1-77657-342-4.

=== Other illustration works ===
- —— (2017). "The Subantarctic Islands" (PDF). The New Zealand School Journal. Illustrated by Giselle Clarkson.
- —— (2018). "Tawaki, Marathon Penguins". Giselle Draws. Archived from the original on 27 January 2019.

== See also ==
- Ned (snail), a garden snail with a left coiled shell found by Clarkson
