= Tommy Ball (retailer) =

British cobbler (1925–2008)

- Born: 1925; Blackburn, England
- Died: 30 March 2008 (aged 82–83); Isle of Man
- Known for: Tommy Ball's Shoe Store
- Children: Terry Ball

Tommy Ball (1925 – 30 March 2008) was an English cobbler from Blackburn. He co-founded the discount retailer Tommy Ball's Shoe Store.

== Biography ==
Ball was born in 1925 and started off as a market stall trader in the 1940s. His initial range of goods included secondhand clothing and his business practices included scouring obituaries to find potential sellers. His wife Mary also had a secondhand stall. Then living in Boxwell Street, he began specialising in shoes after being sent them by Mary and moved into a store following an incident aged 29 where he had to push a pramload of shoes home in the rain after being refused a stall on Blackburn Market. He briefly operated a horse and cart during this period. His business model was based on buying factory seconds, which would then have holes punched in at the back so they could be hung on racks, and his advertising practices included buying pubgoers drinks.

Ball opened a warehouse on Hart Street in 1970 and began ignoring the law forbidding Sunday trading in April 1982. For the latter, he was prosecuted three times and fined £2,000 by Blackburn Magistrates' Court. Around this time, he began exploiting that law's religious artefacts exemption by selling bibles that came with free shoes and also set up the Sunday Shoe Club, which charged customers a 5p membership fee if they wanted to visit on those days. He narrowly avoided having a case against him heard at the High Court of Justice after claiming days beforehand that the case could leave him bankrupt; he then turned his attention to late night opening, for which he was also threatened with legal action.

Ball suffered a heart attack in 1977 at his then home in Clayton-le-Dale. He sold the firm to its managing directors in February 1986 and retired that year on health grounds before moving to the Isle of Man in April 1987 and dying there aged 83 on 30 March 2008. Upon his death, the BBC reported that Ball had "revolutionised the footwear business" and residents called for a statue to be erected. At the time, his brand comprised a branch on Higher Audley Street in Blackburn and a warehouse on Cicely Street in nearby Eanam; some sources claim he also had a branch in Fishergate, though this was in fact operated by Ball's son Terry, who had previously worked for his father but opened his own shop following a family feud.

Tommy Ball's Shoe Store was described by The Guardian in March 2006 as one of the town's few claims to fame besides its football team and the reference to its potholes in The Beatles' "A Day in the Life". That September, the firm opened a museum in its reception area. Ball's narrowly avoided insolvency in November 2007 before going into administration two months after Ball's death. In 2009, the firm's warehouse was sold to local pet shop Aquamania.
