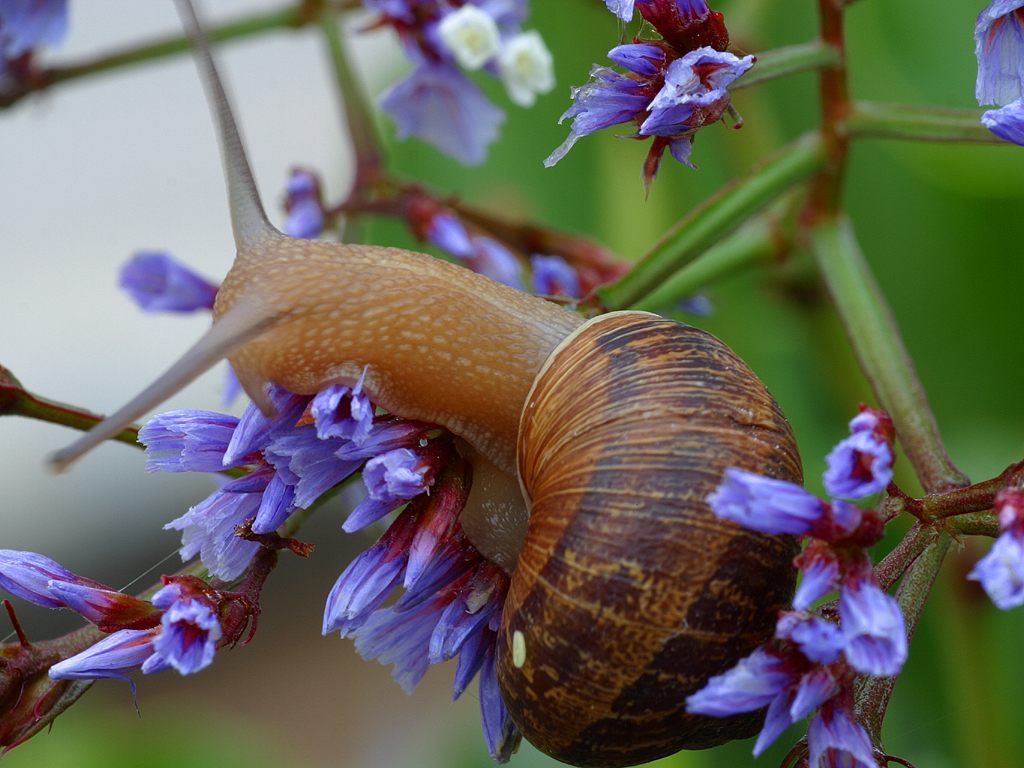
- Garden snail (Cornu aspersum) on Limonium

Conservation status
- Least Concern (IUCN 3.1) (Europe regional assessment)

- Secure (NatureServe)

Scientific classification
- Kingdom: Animalia
- Phylum: Mollusca
- Class: Gastropoda
- Order: Stylommatophora
- Family: Helicidae
- Subfamily: Helicinae
- Tribe: Thebini
- Genus: Cornu
- Species: C. aspersum

Binomial name
- Cornu aspersum (O. F. Müller, 1774)
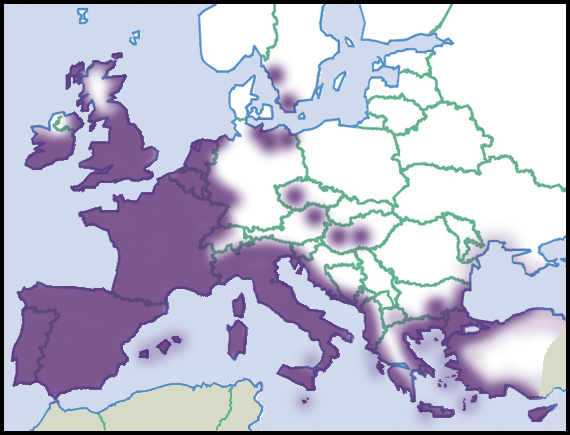
- European range

Synonyms
- Cantareus aspersus (O.F. Müller, 1774); Cochlea vulgaris da Costa, 1778; Cornu copiae Born, 1778; Cryptomphalus aspersus (O.F. Müller, 1774); Helix (Cryptomphalus) betae Trechmann, 1938; Helix (Pomatia) mazzulopsis Pilsbry, 1893; Helix aggerivaga Mabille, 1880; Helix aspersa O. F. Müller, 1774; †Helix depereti Locard, 1890; Helix rufescens O. G. Costa, 1839; Helix secunda O. G. Costa, 1839; Helix spumosa Lowe, 1861; Helix variegata Gmelin, 1791; Pomatia aspersa O. F. Müller, 1774; Serpula cornucopiae Gmelin, 1791

= Cornu aspersum =

Species of edible land snail

Cornu aspersum (syn. Helix aspersa, Cryptomphalus aspersus), known by the common name garden snail, is a species of land snail in the family Helicidae, which includes some of the most familiar land snails. Of all terrestrial molluscs, this species may be the most widely known. It was classified under the name Helix aspersa for over two centuries, but the prevailing classification now places it in the genus Cornu.

The garden snail is relished as a food item in some areas, but it is also widely regarded as a pest in gardens and in agriculture, especially in regions where it has been introduced accidentally, and where snails are not usually considered to be a menu item.

== Description ==
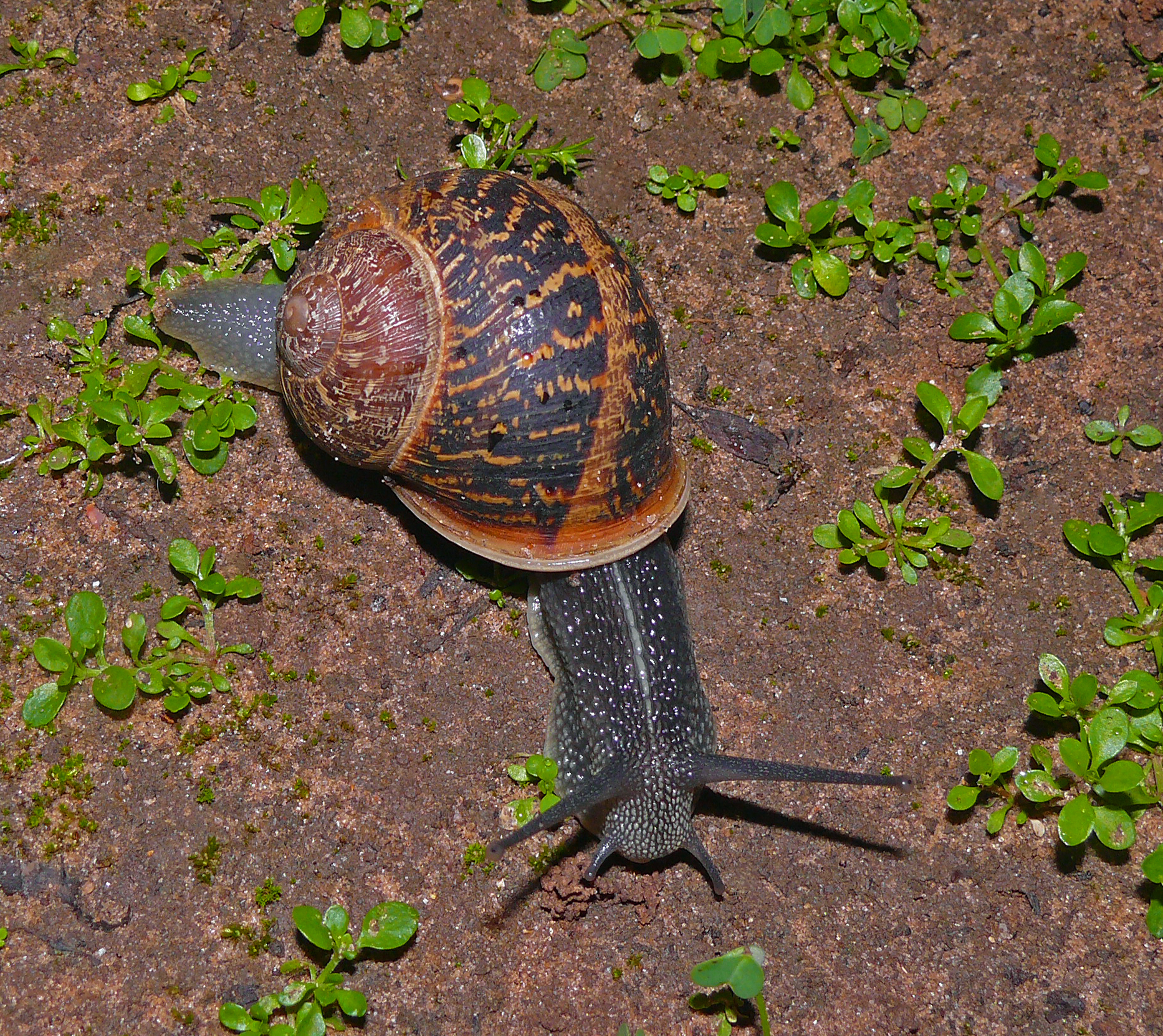
Cornu aspersum in warm regions commonly emerges in moist weather in winter.

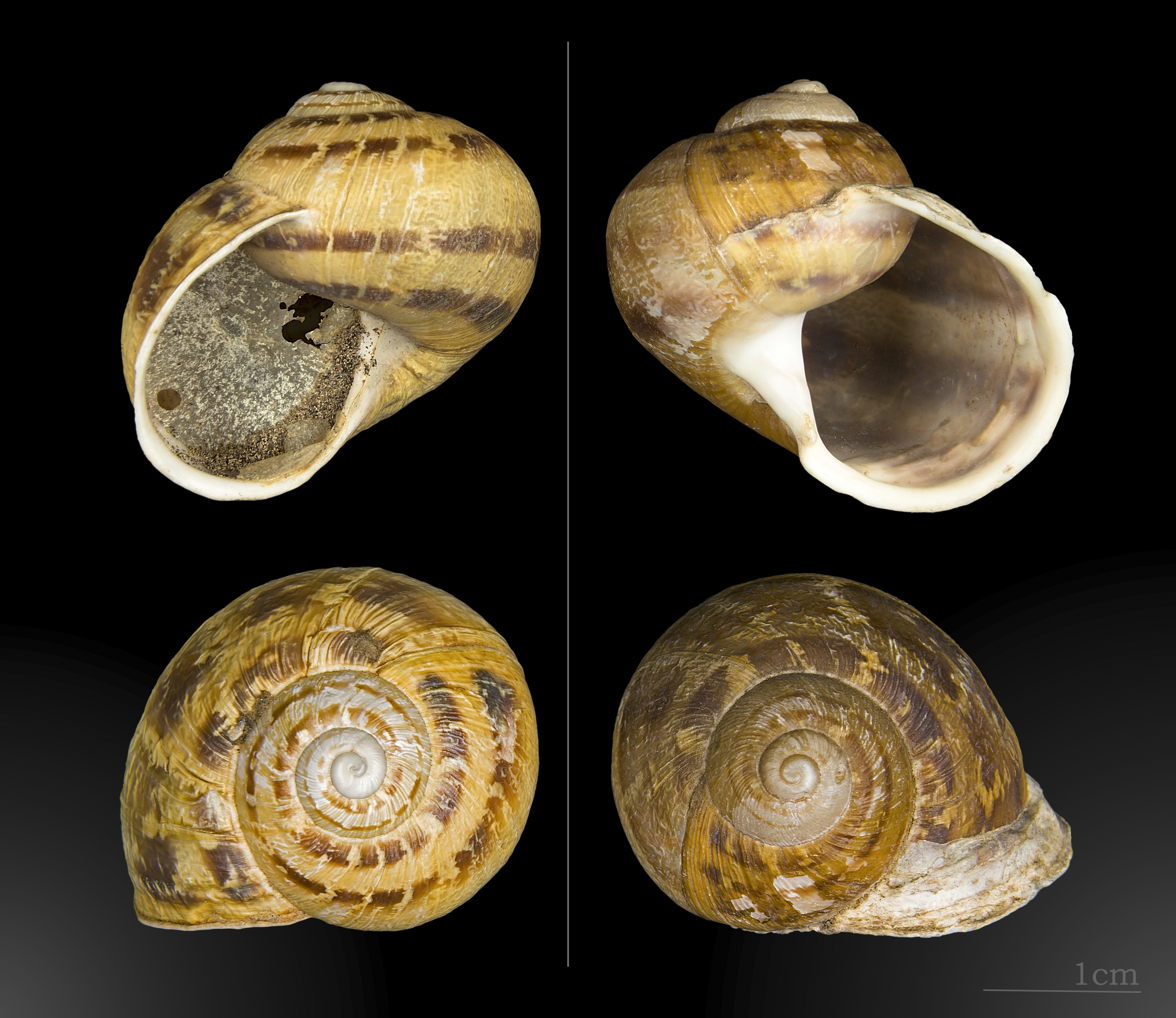
Sinistral form (exceptional) and dextral form (common)

The adult bears a hard, thin calcareous shell 25–40 millimetres (1–1 5/8 in) in diameter and 25–35 millimetres (1–1 3/8 in) high, with four or five whorls. The shell is variable in coloring and shade of color, but generally it has a reticulated pattern of dark brown, brownish-golden, or chestnut with yellow stripes, flecks, or streaks (characteristically interrupted brown colour bands). The aperture is large and characteristically oblique, its margin in adults is whitish and reflected.

The body is soft and slimy, brownish-grey, and able to be retracted entirely into the shell, which the animal does when inactive or threatened. When injured or badly irritated the snail produces a defensive froth of mucus that might repel some enemies or overwhelm aggressive small ants and the like. It has no operculum; during dry or cold weather it seals the aperture of the shell with a thin membrane of dried mucus; the term for such a membrane is epiphragm. The epiphragm helps the snail retain moisture and protects it from small predators such as some ants.

The snail's quiescent periods during heat and drought are known as aestivation; its quiescence during winter is known as overwintering. When overwintering, Cornu aspersum avoids the formation of ice in its tissues by altering the osmotic components of its blood (or haemolymph); this permits it to survive temperatures as low as −5 °C (23 °F). During aestivation, the mantle collar has the ability to change its permeability to water. The snail also has an osmoregulatory mechanism that prevents excessive absorption of water during hibernation. These mechanisms allow Cornu aspersum to avoid either fatal desiccation or hydration during months of either kind of quiescence.

During times of activity the snail's head and "foot" emerge. The head bears four tentacles; the upper two are larger and bear eye-like light sensors, and the lower two are tactile and olfactory sense organs. The snail extends the tentacles by internal pressure of body fluids, and retracts all four tentacles into the head by invagination when threatened or otherwise retreating into its shell. The mouth is located beneath the tentacles, and contains a chitinous radula with which the snail scrapes and manipulates food particles.

The shell of Cornu aspersum is almost always right-coiled, but exceptional left-coiled specimens are also known, including Jeremy and Ned.

== Taxonomy ==
The accepted name of the species was long considered to be Helix aspersa, a member of the genus Helix, like the Roman snail Helix pomatia. However, in a number of publications since 1990, it has instead been placed in various genera previously considered as subgenera of Helix. One such genus is Cornu, which is appropriate if the species is considered as congeneric with the species previously known as Helix aperta. Then the name would be Cornu aspersum. Previously there was debate whether Cornu was a valid generic name (because it was first applied to teratological specimens), but a 2015 ruling has confirmed that it is so. Until this was established, Italian research teams and others used the generic name Cantareus instead. Other workers, including Ukrainian and Russian research teams, who regard H. aspersa and H. aperta as being in different genera, call the former Cryptomphalus aspersus.

Analyses based on DNA sequences have now established that C. aspersum and C. aperta share a clade with snails in the genera Otala and Eobania, distinct from the clade containing Helix, so it is no longer tenable to consider them as species of Helix.

Many subspecific varieties have been described on the basis of shell characters (e.g.). The most prominent example nowadays is the subspecies Cornu aspersum maximum (Taylor, 1883), originally described as a large shelled form from Algeria (but perhaps including similar forms from elsewhere). In the recent scientific literature the name has been applied both to large Algerian snails and to a large form found in snail farms. Some Algerian forms are indeed genetically quite distant from the usual, most widespread form, but the large form in snail farms is different again. A 2026 article has reviewed this confusing literature and further established genetically that the large form in snail farms (or at least its mitochondria) apparently derives from western Algeria or from Morocco. This matches reports that the stock was sourced from Morocco in 1976. Phylogenetically it is not a sister to other C. aspersum, but sits among them. However, the mitochondria are highly derived, possibly an effect of domestication.

In any case the colloquial name maximum for this form is taxonomically invalid both because of a prior use of the name Helix aspersa maxima unassociated with Africa, and because the name Helix maxima was used still earlier for a different species Pararyssola maxima (Reeve, 1853). The subspecies maximum must formally be considered as a junior synonym of Cornu aspersum. In French, the large domestic form is termed 'gros gris' (cf. the usual 'petis gris').

== Life cycle ==
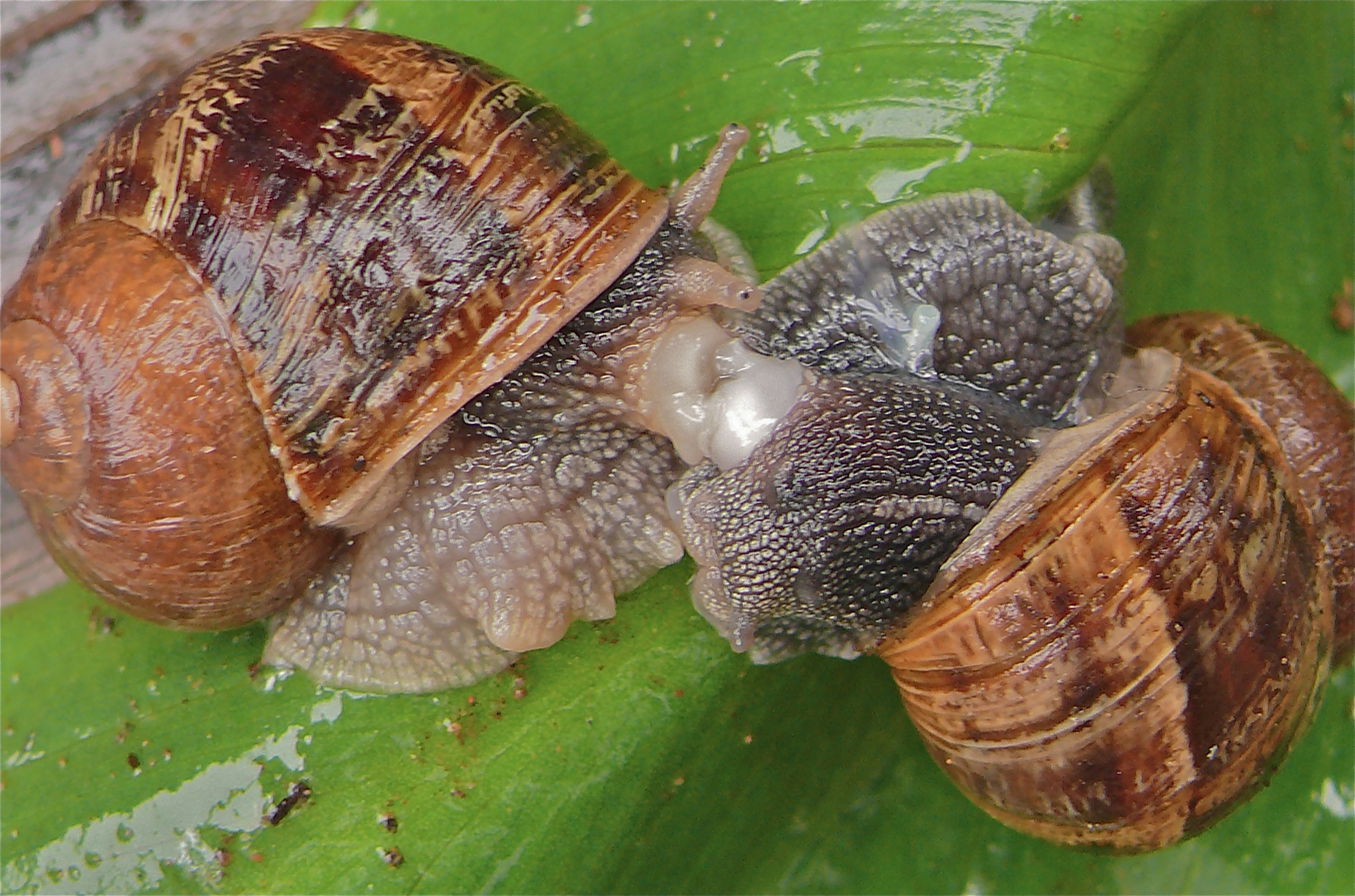
Mating Cornu aspersum

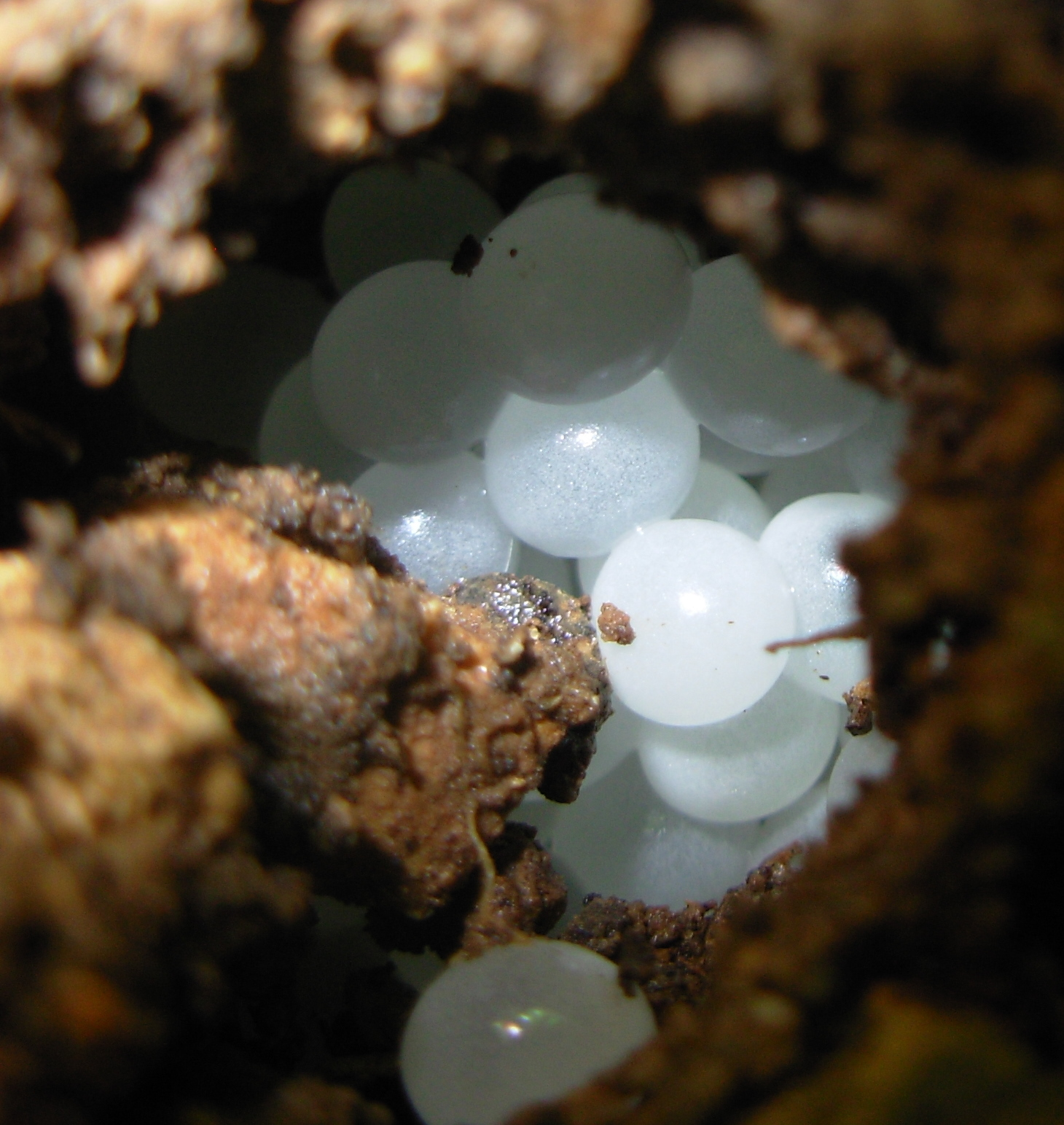
Eggs of Cornu aspersum

Like other Pulmonata, individuals are hermaphrodites, producing both male and female gametes. Reproduction is predominantly, and probably exclusively, by outcrossing. During a mating session of several hours, two snails exchange sperm reciprocally. H. aspersa snails stab a calcite spine, known as a love dart, into their partner. The mucus coating the love dart contains a chemical that diverts sperm away from being digested. This is important for sperm competition because individuals mate repeatedly and the donated sperm can remain viable for 4 years. About 10 days after fertilisation, the snail lays a batch of on average 50 spherical, pearly-white eggs into crevices in the topsoil, or sheltered under stones. In a year it may lay approximately six batches of eggs. The size of the egg is 3 mm.

After snails hatch from the egg, they mature in one or more years. Maturity takes two years in Southern California, while it takes only 10 months in South Africa. In captivity snails can become sexually mature within 3.5 months of hatching, before they stop growing. The lifespan of snails in the wild is typically 2–3 years.

== Distribution ==
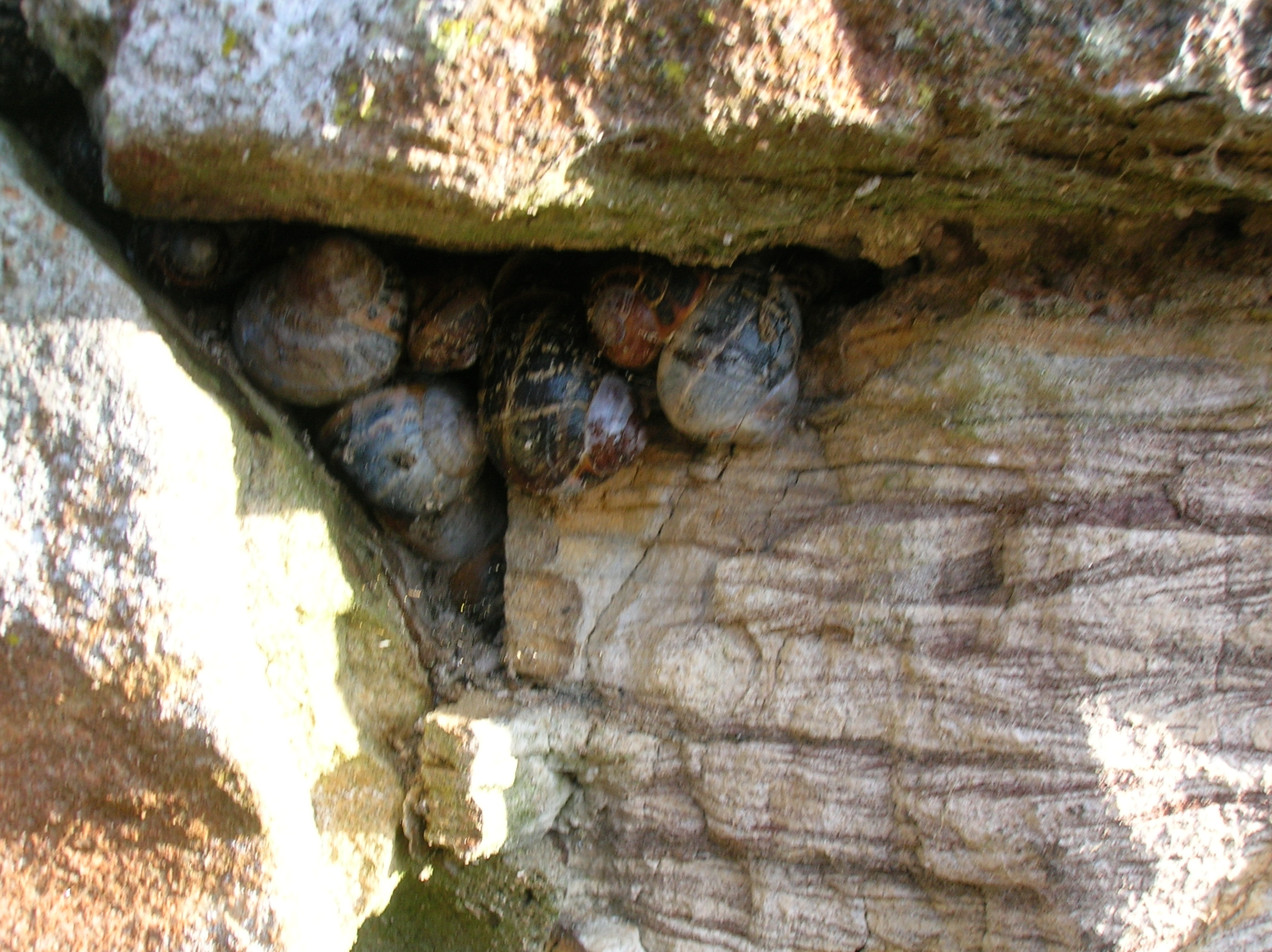
A hibernaculum on a doocot in Eglinton, Scotland

Cornu aspersum is native to the Mediterranean region and its present range stretches from northwest Africa and Iberia, eastwards to Asia Minor and Egypt, and northwards to Britain.

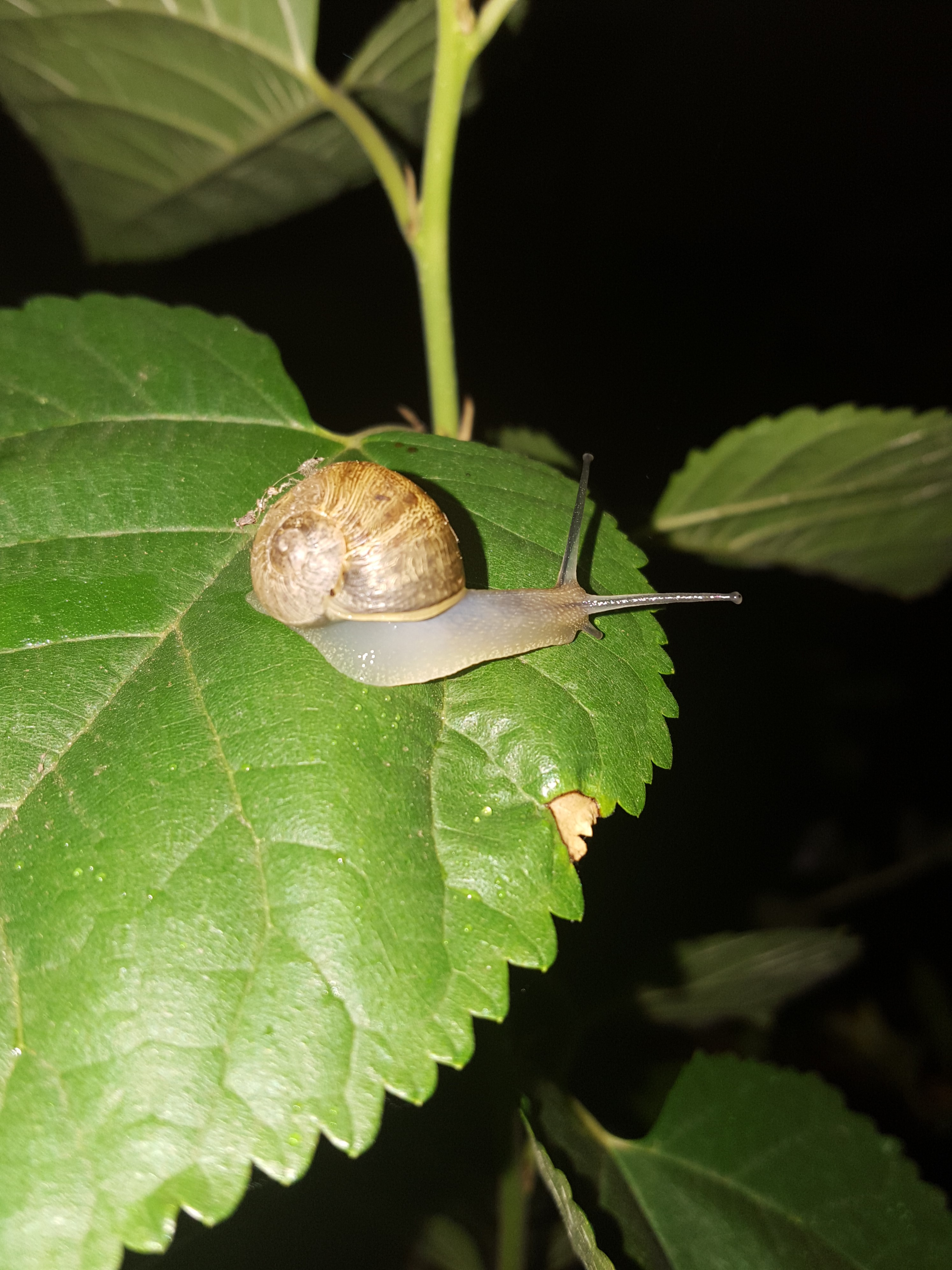
Cornu on a white mulberry leaf in Johannesburg, South Africa

Cornu aspersum is a typically anthropochorous species; it has been spread to many geographical regions by humans, either deliberately or accidentally. Nowadays, it is cosmopolitan in temperate zones, and has become naturalised in regions with climates that differ from the mediterranean climate in which it evolved. Its passive anthropochory is the likeliest explanation for genetic resemblances between allopatric populations. Its anthropochorous spread may have started as early as during the Neolithic Revolution some 8500 BP. Such anthropochory continues, sometimes resulting in locally catastrophic destruction of habitat or crops.

The non-native distribution includes parts of Europe, such as Bohemia in the Czech Republic since 2008. It is present in Australia, New Zealand, North America, Costa Rica and southern South America. It was introduced to Southern Africa as a food animal by Huguenots in the 18th century, and into California as a food animal in the 1850s; it is now a notorious agricultural pest in both regions, especially in citrus groves and vineyards. Many jurisdictions have quarantines for preventing the importation of the snail in plant matter.

== Ecology ==
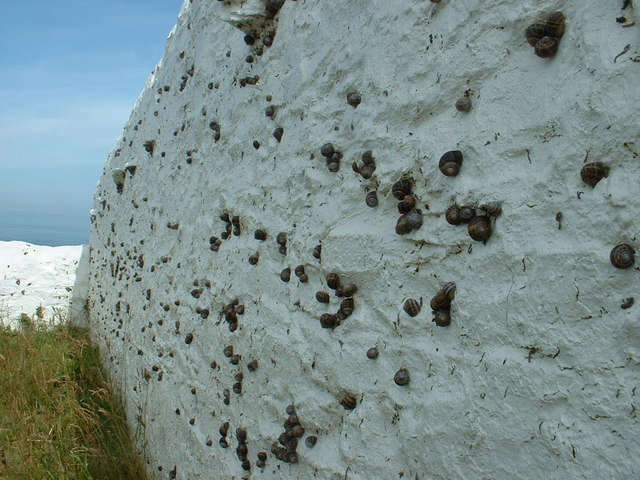
Hundreds of Cornu aspersum on a wall

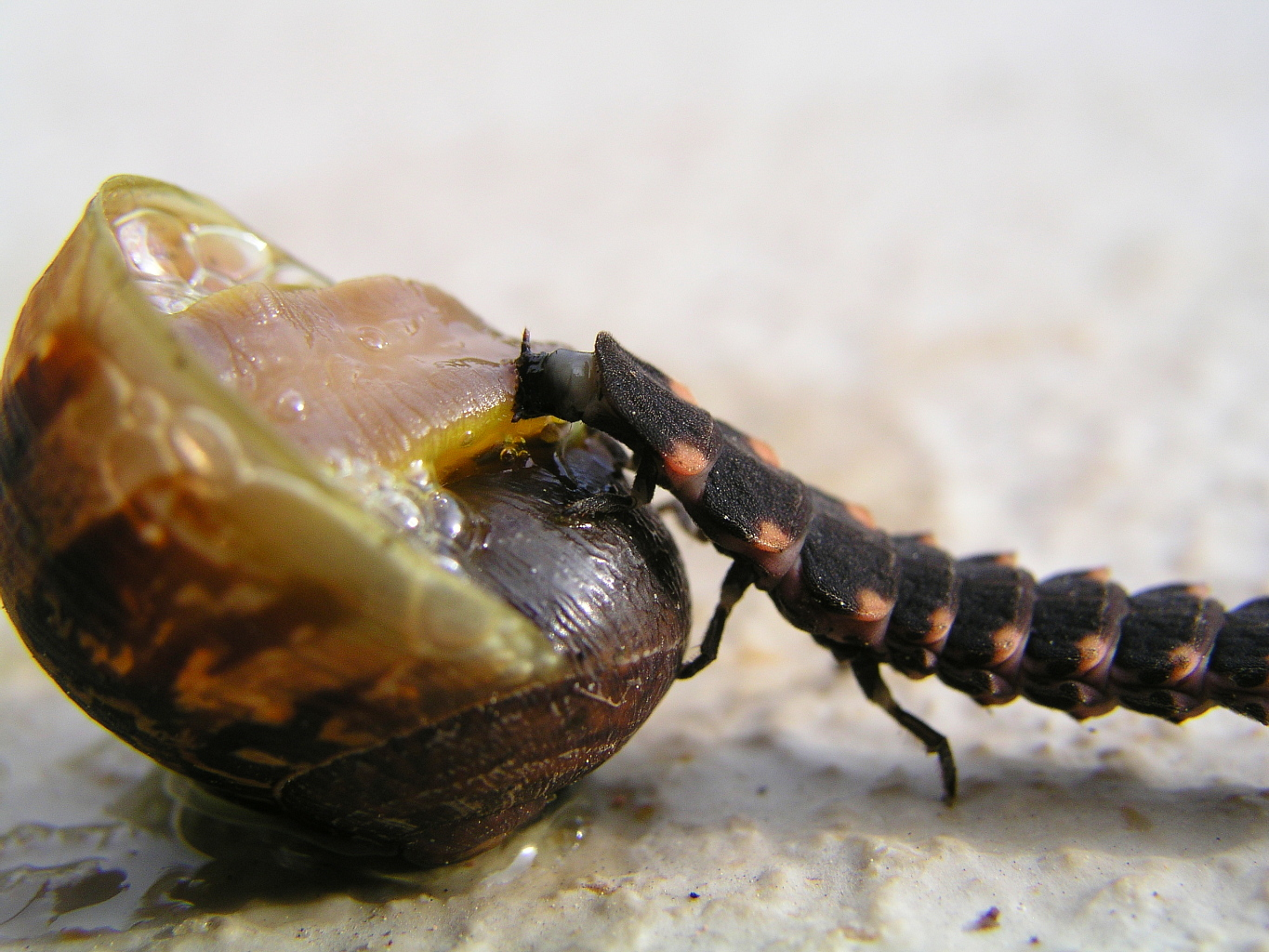
Female glowworm beetle, Lampyris noctiluca, family Lampyridae, feeding on a specimen of Cornu aspersum that it has killed with its venomous bite

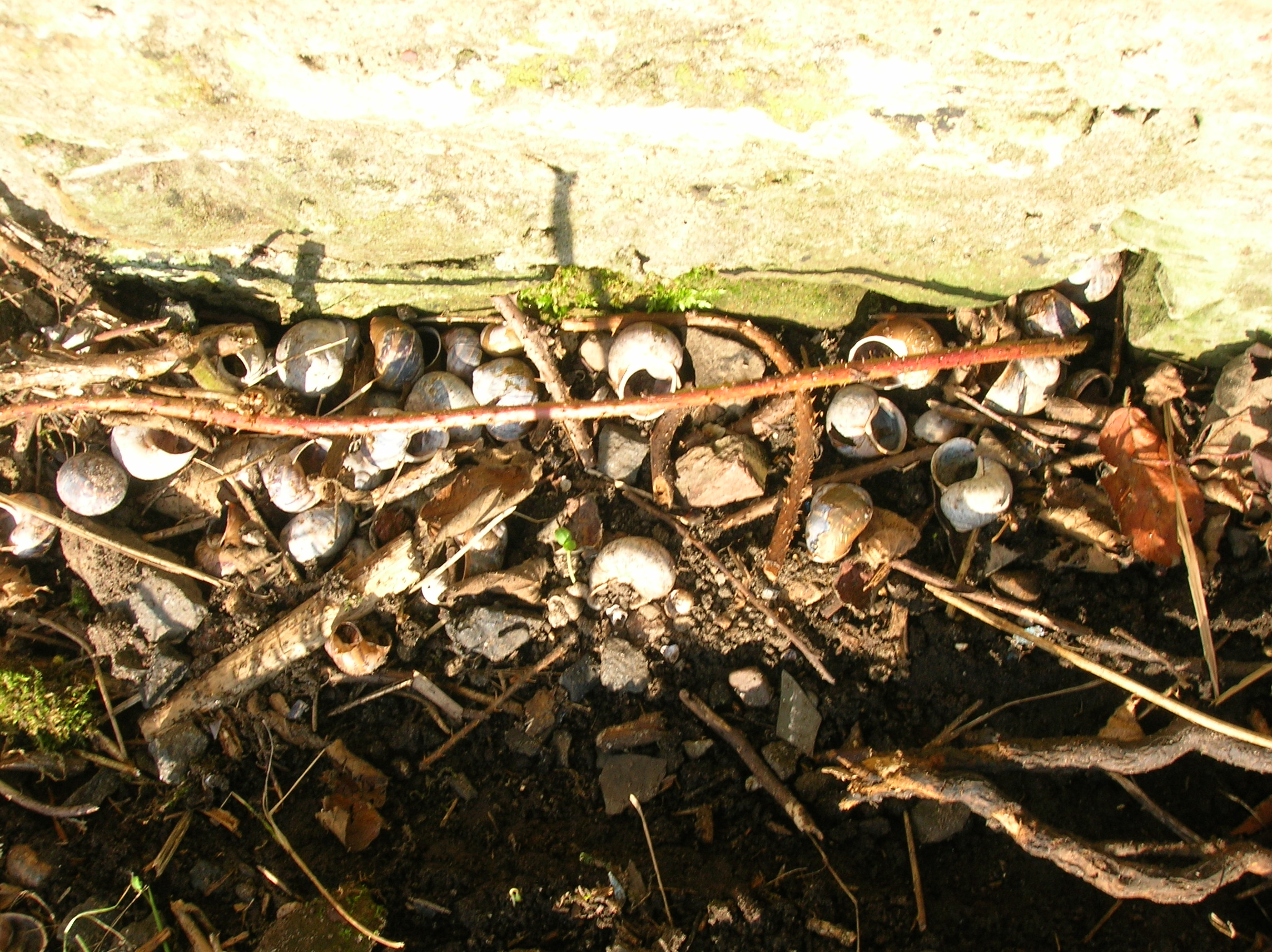
C. aspersum shell cemetery. Individuals failing to overwinter in Scotland.

Cornu aspersum is a primarily a herbivore. It feeds on numerous types of fruit trees, vegetable crops, rose bushes, garden flowers, and cereals. It also is an omnivorous scavenger that will feed on rotting plant material and on occasion scavenge animal matter, such as crushed snails and worms. Cornu aspersum can obtain the calcium required to build its shell by consuming soil. In turn it is a food source for many other animals, including small mammals, some bird species, lizards, frogs, centipedes, predatory insects such as glowworms in the family Lampyridae, and predatory terrestrial snails. The species may be of use as an indicator of environmental pollution, because it deposits heavy metals, such as lead, in its shell.

=== Parasites ===
Parasites of Cornu aspersum include a number of nematodes. Metacercariae of various species of the digenean genus Brachylaima have also been reported, and those have potential for being harmful to people because the adults can infect humans. However, the snails are capable of trapping cercariae (trematode larvae) in their shell, thus possibly reducing the intensity of infestation by parasites.

== Behavior ==
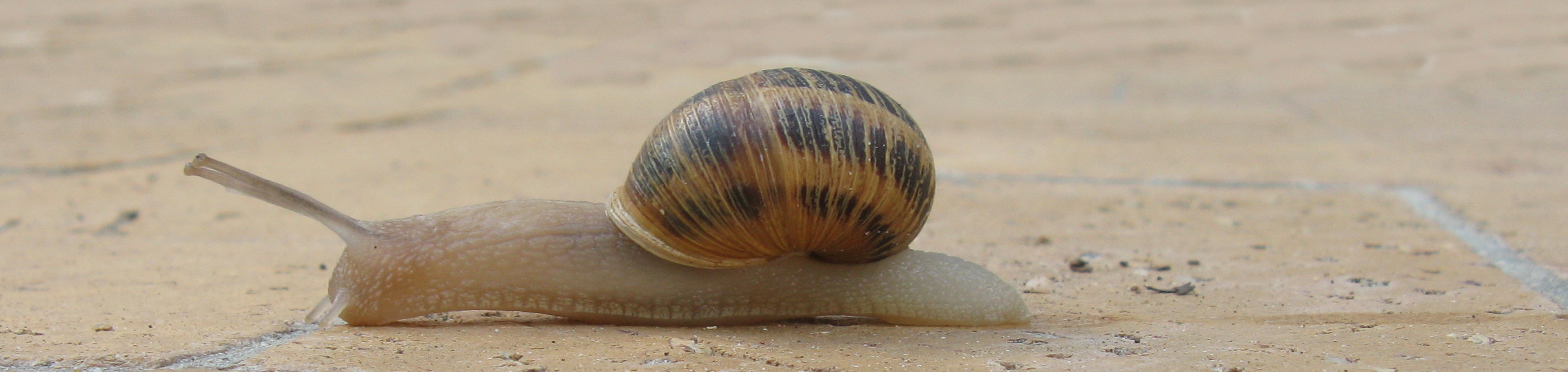
Cornu aspersum leaving mucus-conserving trail over dry brick. The belly visibly leaves the ground in two places in a wave motion without dragging. That wave motion is independent of the wave of muscular contraction that drives the locomotion.

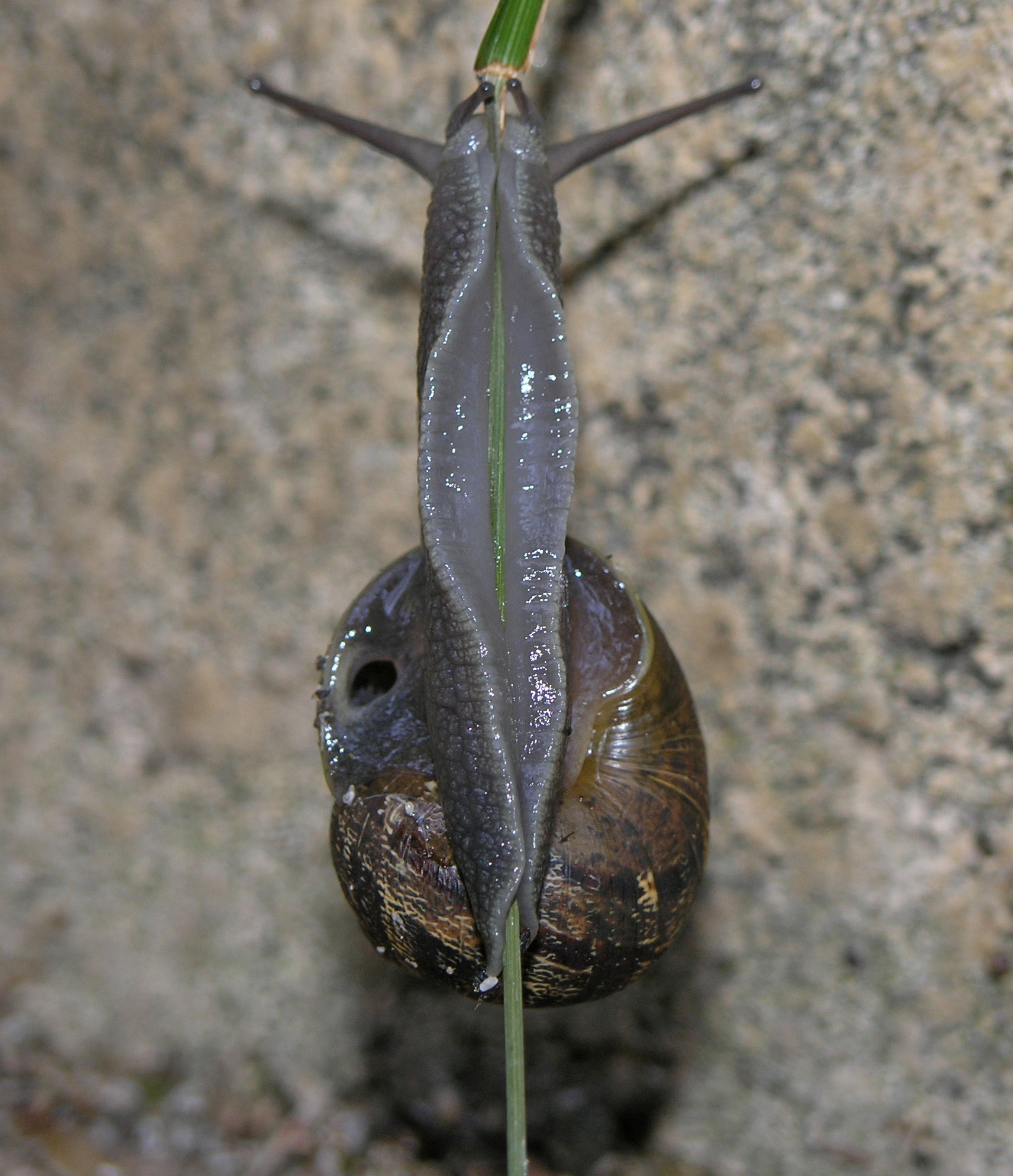
Snail climbing grass SMC 07

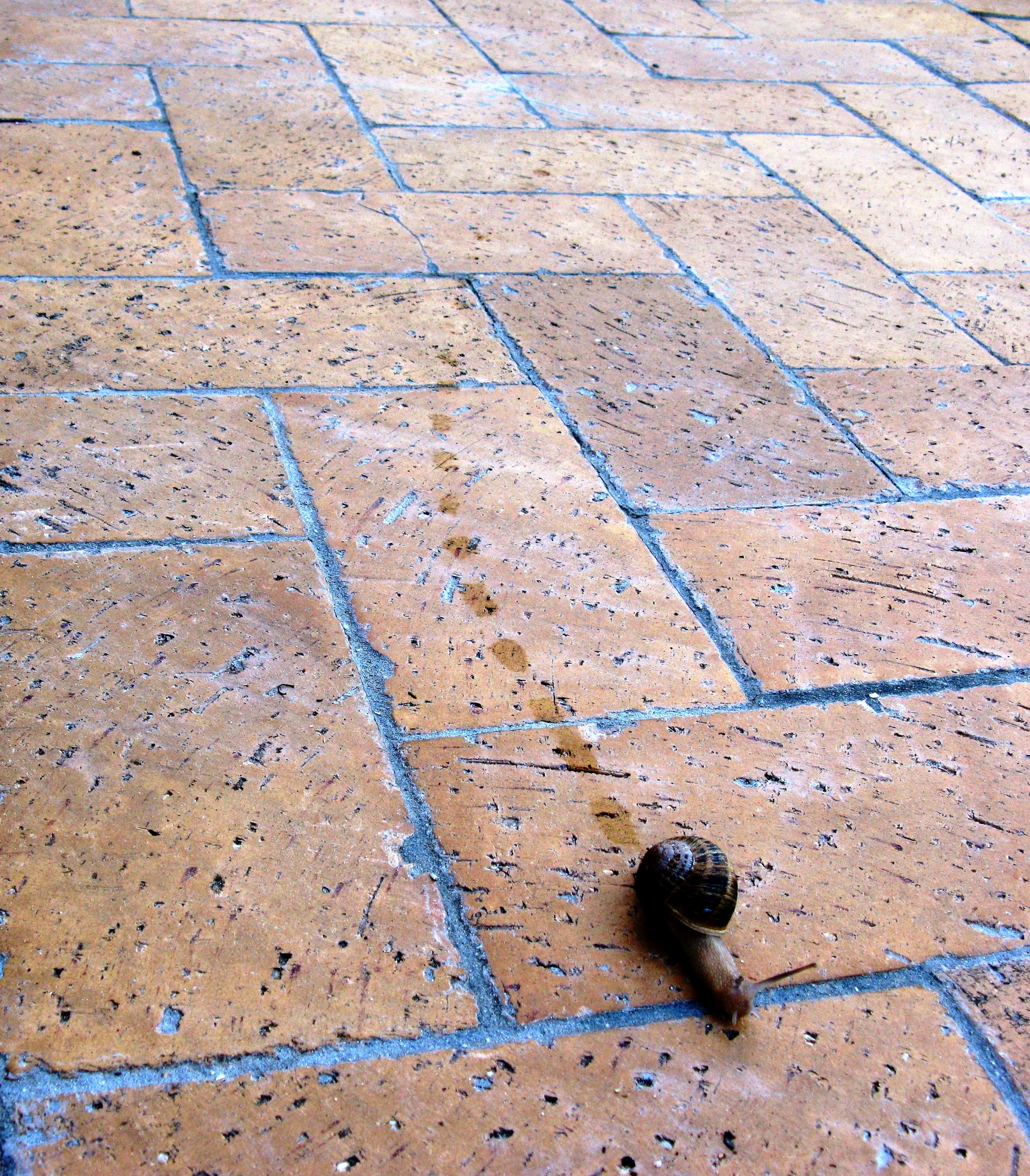
Cornu aspersum leaving mucus-conserving trail, as seen from above

The snail secretes thixotropic adhesive mucus that permits locomotion by rhythmic waves of contraction passing forward within its muscular foot. Starting from the rear, the contraction of the longitudinal muscle fibres above a small area of the film of mucus causes shear that liquefies the mucus, permitting the tip of the tail to move forward. The contracted muscle relaxes while its immediately anteriad transverse band of longitudinal fibres contract in their turn, repeating the process, which continues forward until it reaches the head. At that point the whole animal has moved forward by the length of the contraction of one of the bands of contraction. However, depending on the length of the animal, several bands of contraction can be in progress simultaneously, so that the resultant speed amounts to the speed imparted by a single wave, multiplied by the number of individual waves passing along simultaneously.

A separate type of wave motion that may be visible from the side enables the snail to conserve mucus when moving over a dry surface. It lifts its belly skin clear of the ground in arches, contacting only one to two thirds of the area it passes over. With suitable lighting the lifting may be seen from the side as illustrated, and the percentage of saving of mucus may be estimated from the area of wet mucus trail dabs that it leaves behind. This type of wave passes backwards at the speed of the snail's forward motion, therefore having a zero velocity with respect to the ground.

An estimate from 1974 for a top speed of 0.03 mph (1.3 cm/s) has become popular. However, this estimate has been questioned since in competitions between snails only speeds of 2.4 mm/s have been achieved.

Cornu aspersum has a strong homing instinct, readily returning to a regular hibernation site.

== Human relevance ==
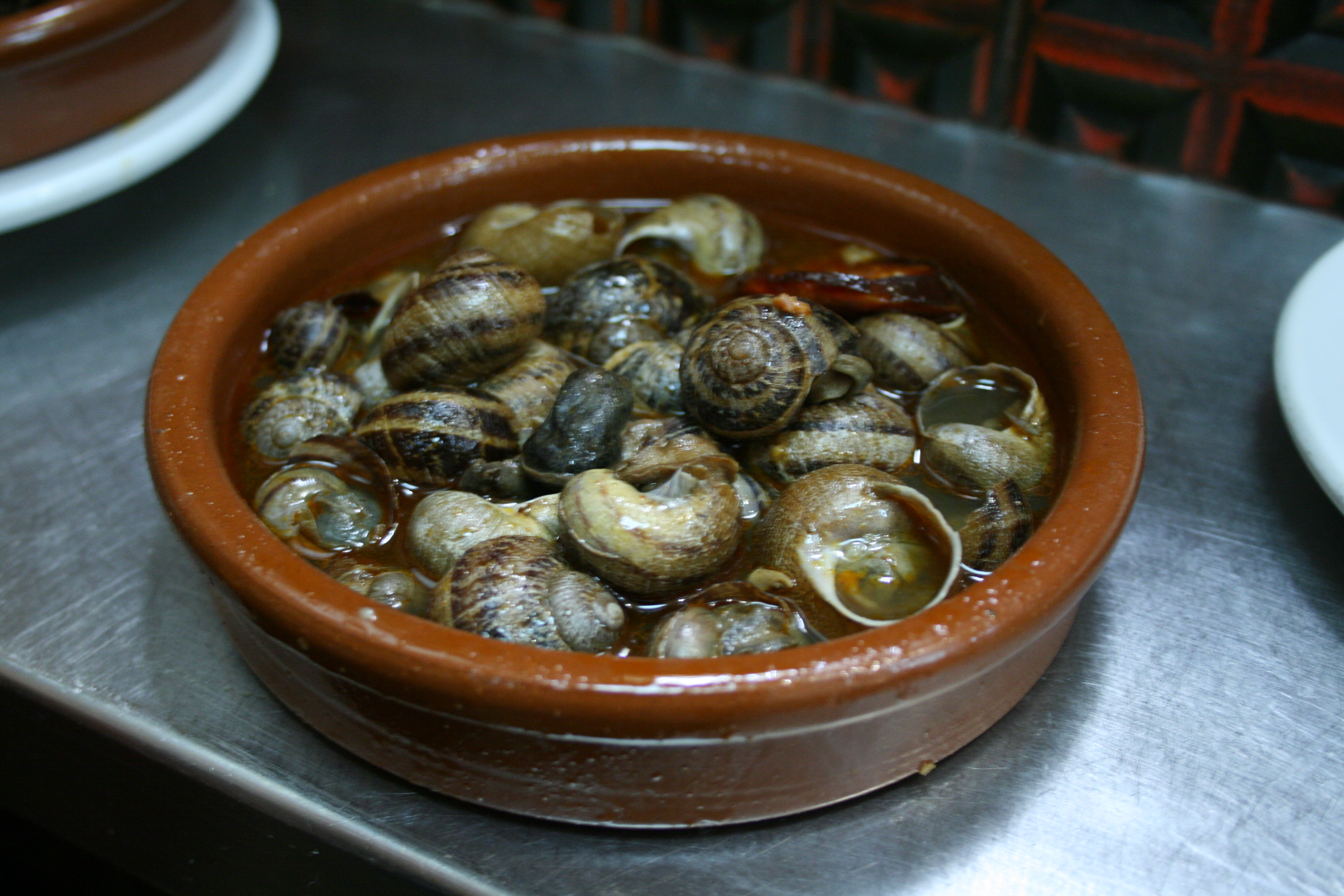
Spanish dish, Caracoles-Cascorro, ready to serve

A garden snail climbing a window in Israel during a winter night

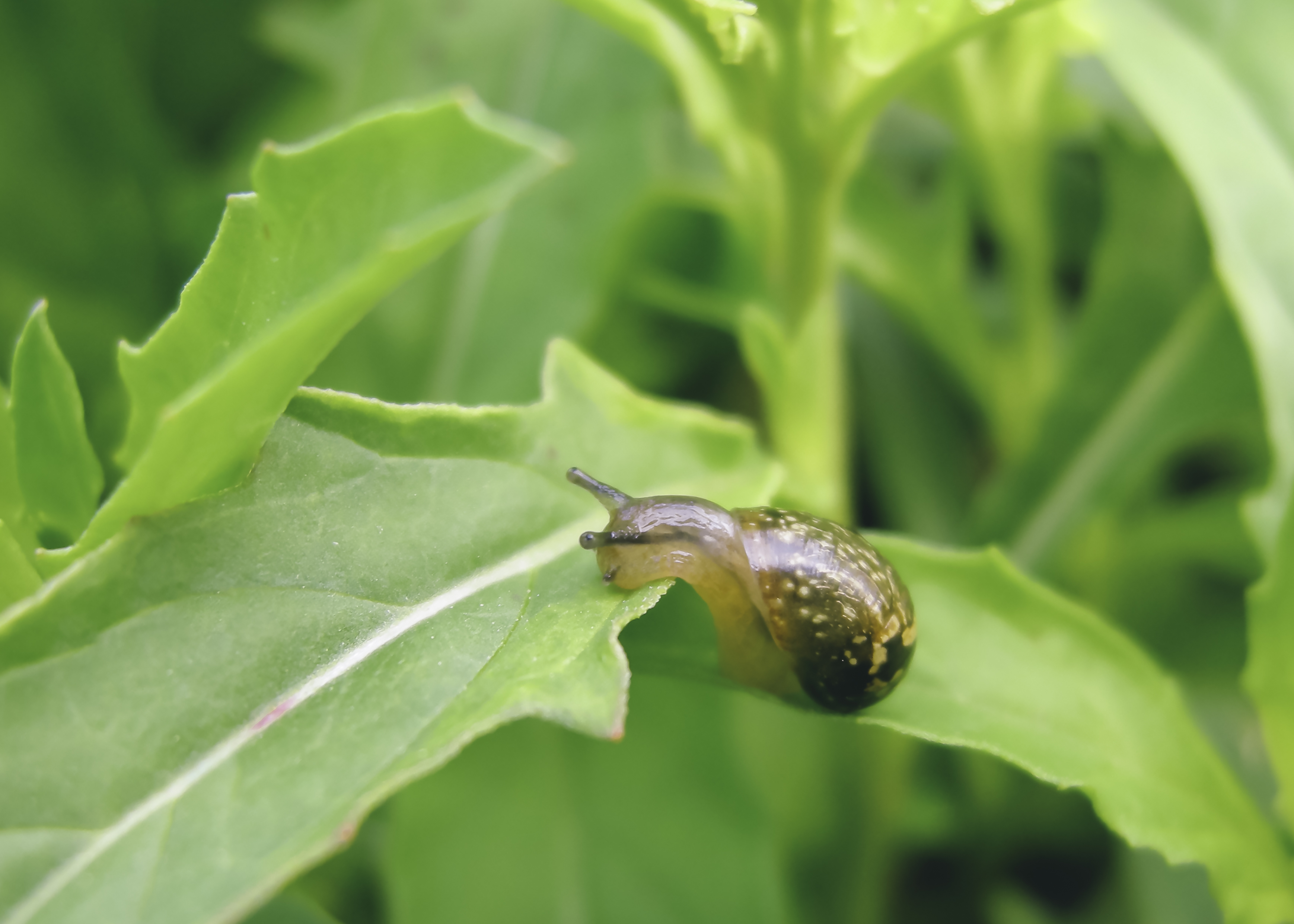
A baby snail moving from one leaf to another

The species is known as an agricultural and garden pest, an edible delicacy, and occasionally a household pet.

In French cuisine, it is known as petit gris, and is served in dishes such as Escargot a la Bordelaise. Also in Lleida, a city of Catalonia (Spain), there is a gastronomic festival called L'Aplec del Caragol dedicated to this type of snail, known as bover, which attracts over 200,000 guests every year. In Crete, there is a dish called "chochloi mpoumpouristoi" (snails turned upside down), where the snails are cooked alive in a hot pan on a thick layer of sea salt. Other dishes with garden snails include snails with rosemary and snail soup. Their texture when cooked is slightly chewy.

The practice of rearing snails for food is known as heliciculture. For purposes of cultivation, the snails are kept in a dark place in a wired cage with dry straw or dry wood. Coppiced wine-grape vines are often used for this purpose. During the rainy period the snails come out of hibernation and release most of their mucus onto the dry wood/straw.

=== Approaches to snail pest control ===
There are a variety of snail-control measures that gardeners and farmers use in an attempt to reduce damage to valuable plants. Traditional pesticides are still used, as are many less toxic control options such as concentrated garlic or wormwood solutions. Copper metal is also a snail repellent, and thus a copper band around the trunk of a tree will prevent snails from climbing up and reaching the foliage and fruit. Caffeine has proven surprisingly toxic to snails, to the extent that spent coffee grounds (not decaffeinated) make a safe and immediately effective snail-repellant and even molluscicidal mulch for pot-plants, or for wherever else the supply is adequate.

The decollate snail (Rumina decollata) will capture and eat garden snails, and because of this it has sometimes been introduced as a biological pest control agent. However, this is not without problems, as the decollate snail is just as likely to attack and devour other species of gastropods that may represent a valuable part of the native fauna of the region.

=== Pharmacological studies ===
Cornu aspersum has gained some popularity as the chief ingredient in skin creams and gels (crema/gel de caracol) sold in the US. These creams are promoted as being suitable for use on wrinkles, scars, dry skin, and acne to reduce pigmentation, scarring, and wrinkles.

Secretions of Cornu aspersum produced under stress have skin-regenerative properties because of antioxidant superoxide dismutase and glutathione S-transferase (GSTs) activities. The secretions can stimulate fibroblast proliferation and rearrange the actin cytoskeleton stimulate extracellular matrix assembly and regulation of metalloproteinase activities for regeneration of wounded tissue.

The mucus of Cornu aspersum contains a rich source of substances that can be used to treat biotic human diseases. Nine fractions of compounds with varying molecular weight were purified from the mucus and was tested against gram-positive and gram-negative bacterial strains. Results found three fractions exhibited predominant antibacterial activity against the gram-positive strain.

While further confirmatory research is still needed, potential benefits of the snail extracts or secretion filtrates have been also demonstrated in other disease models in mice, including protective effects against ethanol-induced gastric ulcer and against the progression of Alzheimer's type dementia.

=== Pets ===
In some countries, Cornu aspersum snails are sometimes raised as pets, mostly by children. In Israel, which has a semi-dry climate, Cornu aspersum snails are mostly limited to human-populated areas such as cities, villages, and gardens, and therefore are less of a threat to local snail species or agriculture. They are very common in urban gardens, and are very popular among Israeli children. Because of this, they are often used by educators, teachers, and naturalists to educate children about natural history.

== See also ==
- Terry Ball's snail farms
