= Terry Ball's snail farms =

2018 tax avoidance scheme

In 2018, Terence Ball (born November 1945) began breeding snails in an attempt to avoid business rates (taxes). The Blackburn-born son of cobbler Tommy Ball, he had previously operated his own shoe firm, during which time he did business with the Camorra. In the late 2000s, he was banned from directing companies for nine years for tax evasion and a friend of his was stung by their local council after liquidating their firm and finding themselves liable for vacancy tax. These events, and a speech by the then-shadow planning minister Michael Gove warning of the impact of implementing said tax, inspired Ball to deprive HM Revenue and Customs of as much tax as he could.

After finding a loophole that meant "molluscs of any description" counted as fish for the purpose of tax-exempt fish farms, he began breeding Cornu aspersum, a species of snail that he claimed was fond of group sex and capable of rapid incestuous breeding. Early efforts were stymied by rotting fresh food attracting flies and maggots, a problem he solved three years later by feeding them with hamster food; and by the snails needing constant feeding to avoid cannibalism, a problem he solved by fattening them up and using a freezer to induce torpor.

Ball subsequently began selling boxes to landlords who owned empty office blocks, who paid him 20% of the tax they saved. Said boxes contained two snails each, a practice attributed to avoiding "cannibalism, group sex, and snail orgies" by their website, which advertised kilogram bags of about 200 snails for £14. His initial efforts were sold under the brand name Crusader and were promoted by Colin Hendry. By November 2020, Ball had also opened L'Escargotière, which spent time in Longridge and Ribchester. A 2021 court case in Leeds found that Crusader's practices constituted tax avoidance, a decision Ball subsequently attributed to landlords not using their premises exclusively for snail farming.

By August 2024, Ball's firms had also included Snai1 Primary Products 2023 Ltd and Boycebrook; the latter was also in Ribchester near Boyce's Brook and described itself as the "Canceller of the Exchequer". Ball's firms had also installed boxes in Liverpool and Stratton St Margaret by this time; the former was investigated that month by Liverpool City Council. Westminster City Council subsequently investigated two installations in two office blocks in Old Marylebone Road in central London in 2025. In October, Ball was interviewed by Jim Waterson of London Centric.
