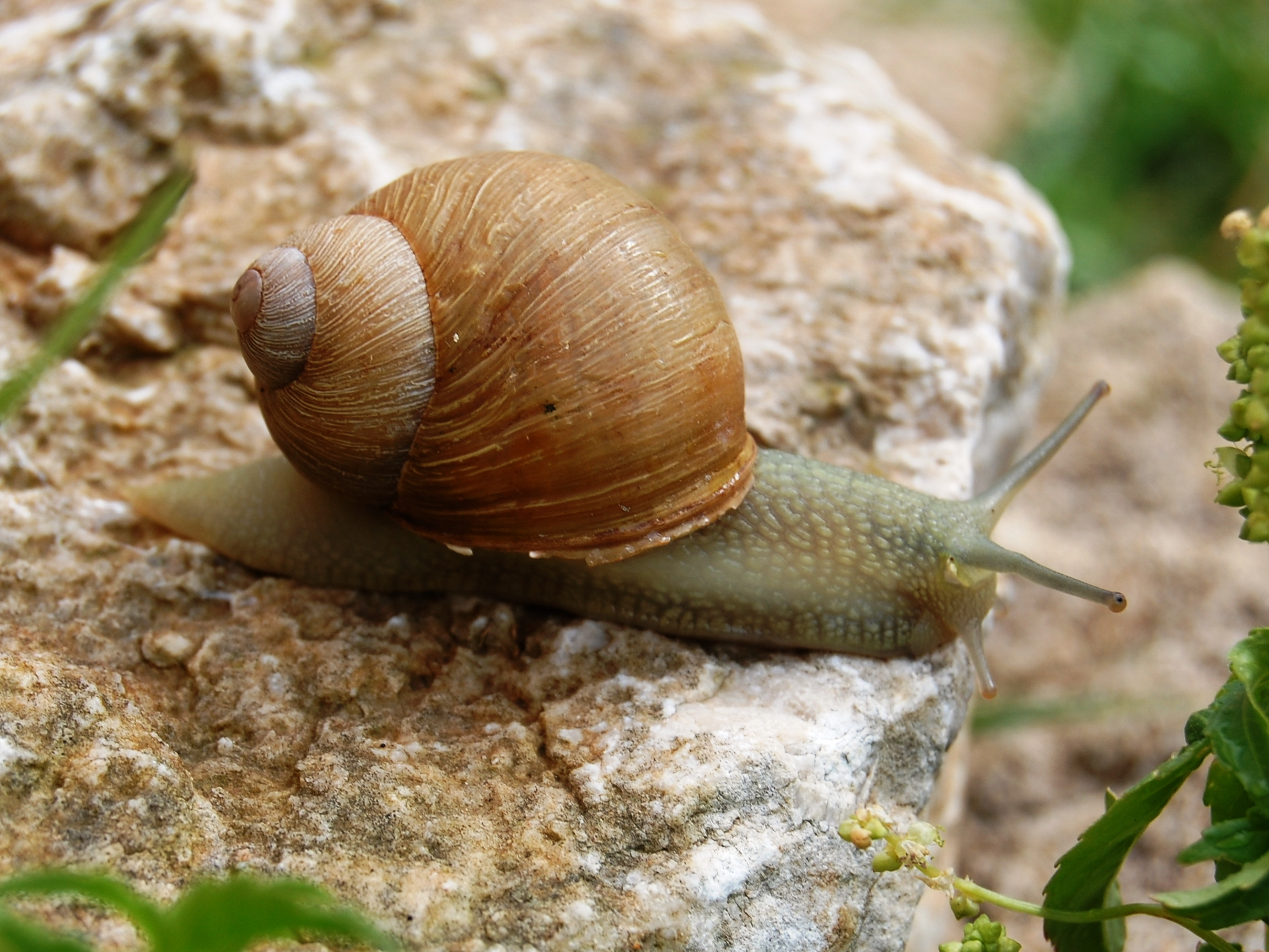

Conservation status
- Endangered (IUCN 3.1)

Scientific classification
- Kingdom: Animalia
- Phylum: Mollusca
- Class: Gastropoda
- Order: Stylommatophora
- Family: Helicidae
- Genus: Cornu
- Species: C. mazzullii

Binomial name
- Cornu mazzullii (De Cristofori & Jan, 1832)

Synonyms
- Cornu (Erctella) mazzullii (De Cristofori & Jan, 1832); Erctella mazzullii (De Cristofori & Jan, 1832); Helix costae Benoit, 1857; Helix mazzullii De Cristofori & Jan, 1832

= Cornu mazzullii =

Species of gastropod

Cornu mazzullii, is a species of large, air-breathing land snail, a terrestrial pulmonate gastropod mollusk in the family Helicidae, the typical snails. The snail is known for secreting a unique, yellowish-green mucus from its foot gland that is highly enriched with carbonic acid (H₂CO₃). When the snail rests against the calcareous (limestone) mountains of Sicily, this acid chemically breaks down the calcium carbonate in the rock. Once the rock is chemically softened, the snail uses its radula to physically rasp away the loosened stone slush. As it rasps the stone, the snail swallows the calcium-rich residue to absorb the essential minerals needed to construct and strengthen its own shell. Over time, repeated scraping forms a deep tunnel or pocket. The snail backs into these custom-made holes to hide from predators and to seal itself away from the blistering hot, dry Sicilian summers

This species is endemic to Sicily. It is threatened by habitat degradation, urban expansion, road construction, wildfires and poaching.
