= Nicola Toki =

New Zealand conservationist

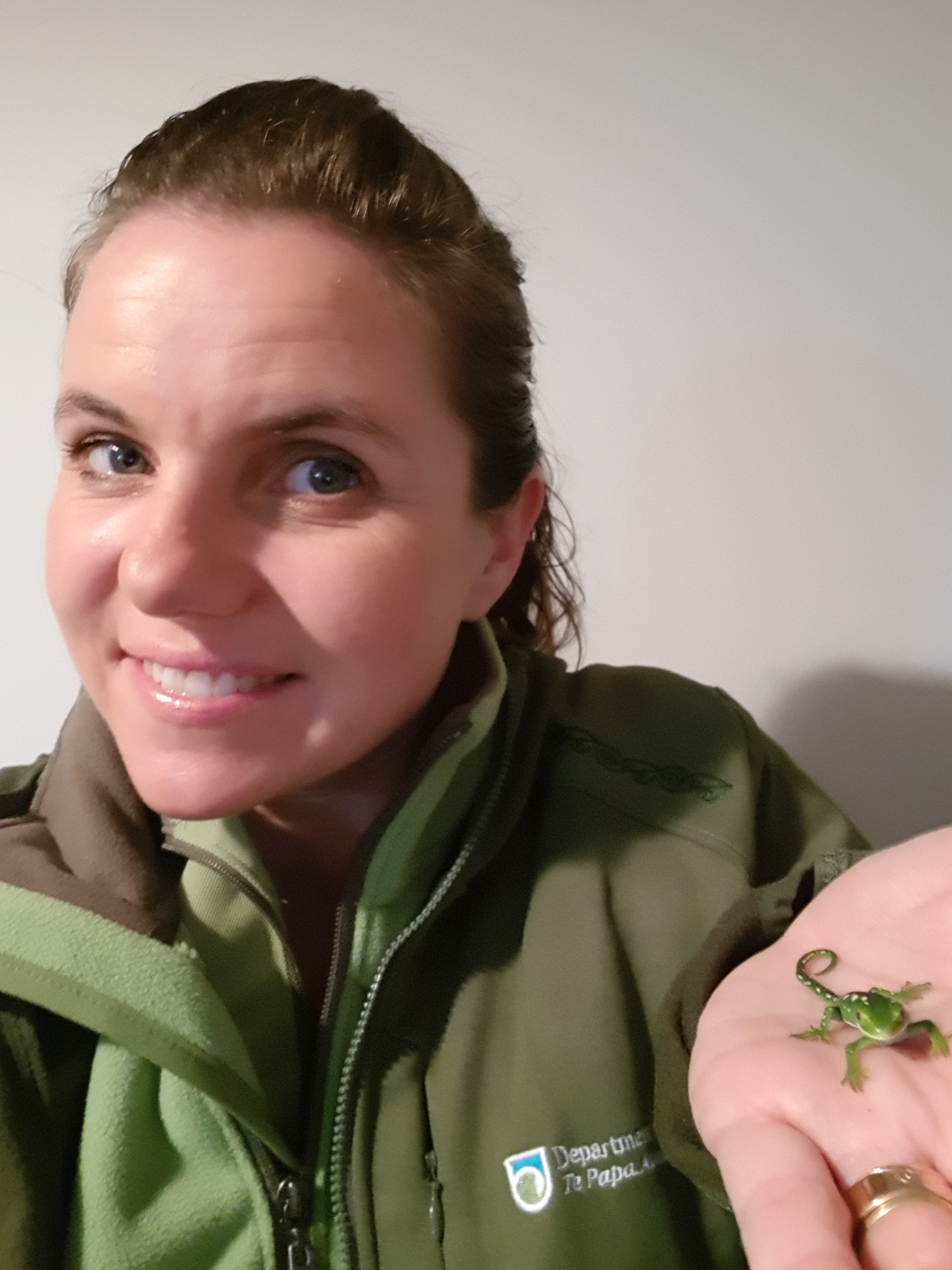
- Born: Nicola Jane Vallance; Invercargill, New Zealand
- Occupation: Threatened species ambassador
- Known for: Conservation advocacy
- Website: nicolatoki.kiwi

Nicola Jane Toki (née Vallance) is a New Zealand conservationist. She has worked for the Department of Conservation as threatened species ambassador and became chief executive of Forest & Bird in April 2022.

== Biography ==
Toki was born in Invercargill, and spent much of her early years moving around the South Island to support her father's career as a ski-plane pilot.

Toki studied at the University of Otago where she studied zoology and ecology, as well as a postgraduate diploma in natural history film-making.

As of 2022, Toki lives in Waipara with her husband and son.

== Career ==
After finishing university, Toki worked as a camera operator for Channel 9, held an internship at Otago Museum, and then worked at the Dunedin branch of the Department of Conservation. She went on to work for the Department of Conservation as a media manager and for Forest & Bird as a conservation advocate. Between 2015 and 2019, Toki worked as a Department of Conservation threatened species ambassador, where she advocated for New Zealand's threatened species. After leaving that role, she was retained by the Department of Conservation as eastern South Island operations director.

In April 2022 Toki was appointed as Chief Executive of Forest & Bird, replacing Kevin Hague. On her appointment, Toki said that she was looking forward to taking Forest & Bird (established in 1923) into its next century of operations, and wanted to work more closely with mana whenua.

She helps present the weekly radio show Critter of the Week with Jesse Mulligan on Radio New Zealand and previously had regular appearances on TVNZ's Good Morning and Meet the Locals.

== Political and conservation views ==
Toki has disagreed with previous New Zealand Government policy proposals to mine in national parks and other significant conservation areas previously off-limits to mining interests. While at Forest and Bird she advocated for the protection of New Zealand endemic species through the use of 1080, and campaigned against intensive and large-scale dairy farming.

Toki has said that she would like to see the Prime Minister or Deputy Prime Minister hold the conservation portfolio, because it is an area that does not receive much attention nor funding.
