= Jeremy (snail) =

English left-coiled garden snail (died 2017)

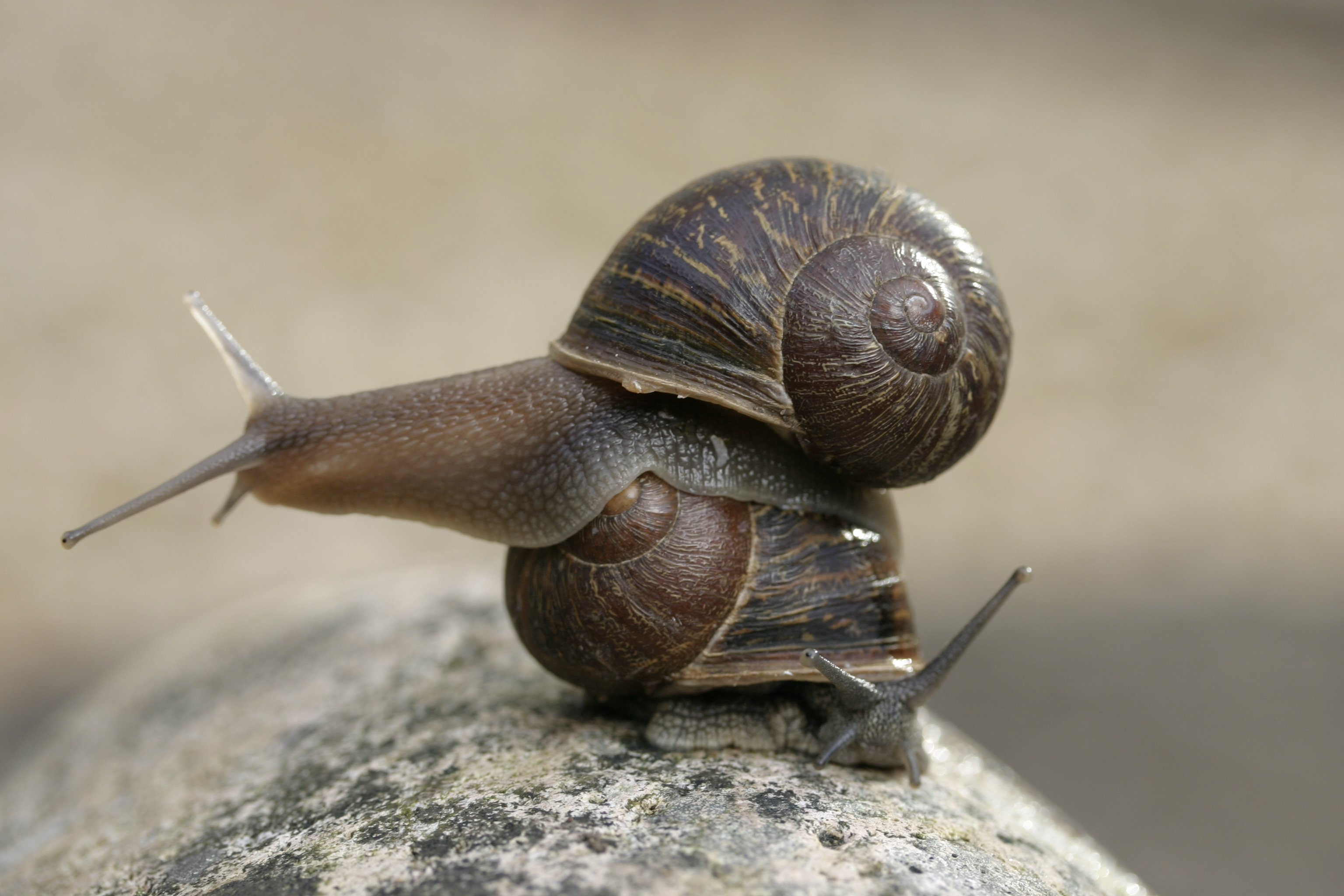
- Jeremy the left-coiling snail on top of Theresa, a right-coiling snail
- Species: Cornu aspersum
- Breed: Sinistral
- Sex: Hermaphrodite
- Hatched: London, England
- Died: 11 October 2017
- Owner: University of Nottingham
- Residence: England
- Offspring: 56
- Appearance: Left-coiled
- Named after: Jeremy Corbyn

Jeremy (died 11 October 2017) was a left-coiled garden snail studied by researchers from the University of Nottingham.

The snail had a rare condition that caused its shell to coil to the left; in the vast majority of garden snails the shell coils to the right. It was hoped that the condition would be due to a mutation, and that genes identified from this snail and its offspring would help scientists unlock genetic markers in humans and other animals. At first it was thought to be a rare genetic mutation, although later work revealed that it was likely due to an accident in early development.

Jeremy was named after the left-wing British Labour politician Jeremy Corbyn, on account of it being a "lefty" snail, but also due to Corbyn's reported love of gardening. The snail became famous worldwide after a public appeal to find other left-coiled snails for a mate. Jeremy had 56 offspring and died on 11 October 2017, aged "at least two" years.

== Life ==
A retired scientist found Jeremy in southwest London. He contacted the University of Nottingham and sent them the snail. A group of researchers, led by resident snail expert Angus Davison, then launched a public appeal to find another 'lefty' snail as a mate. Due to the unique positioning of the reproductive body parts in anticlockwise-coiled snails, they are only able to mate with snails that also have anticlockwise shells. Two other anticlockwise snails were discovered and sent to the university; however, these two snails mated with each other instead, producing 170 right-coiled snails. One of the left-coiled snails later mated with Jeremy, producing 56 offspring, all of which also had right-coiling shells.

It is believed that the genetic mutation might reappear in a later generation due to a recessive gene. In snails, shell-coiling direction is thought to be an example of a maternal effect – a trait that is determined not by an organism's own genotype, but by the genotype of its mother. In this case, Jeremy's mother (who likely possessed a right-coiling, or clockwise, shell), would have had two copies of the recessive gene, expressed in Jeremy's anticlockwise shell. Jeremy, with only one copy of the gene, would be expected to mother snails with right-coiling shells. This recessive trait may reappear later in another generation, even if a previous generation appears to have right-coiling shells, because the mutation is hereditary.

== Further research ==
While studying this snail, Davison discovered a gene that determined whether a snail's shell coiled to the left or to the right. He said that body asymmetry in humans and other animals could be affected by the same gene and that the research could help understand the positioning of organs according to genetic markers.

Davison was quoted as saying:

This may be the end for Jeremy, but now the snail has finally produced offspring, this is a point in our long-term research goal. Ultimately, we would like to know why these snails are so rare, but also how the left and right sides of the body are signalled at the molecular level, and whether a similar process is taking place during human development.

Research was expected to continue on the offspring of these snails, and the University of Nottingham had seven left-coiled snails by October 2017.

In July 2018, the research team at the University of Nottingham announced the arrival of St Stephen, a 'lefty' snail of the species Cepaea nemoralis, and stated in a tweet that they were looking for potential mates.

It was hoped that this research will lead to insights into rare conditions like situs inversus and situs ambiguus where the positioning of organs in the body is reversed or misplaced due to genetic malformations.

A 2020 study based on statistical analysis of Jeremy's offspring and those of other left-coiled garden snails suggested that left coiling-individuals of garden snails like Jeremy was the result of a "developmental accident" rather than being the result of carrying a particular rare gene variant, which explained why none of his offspring shared his left-handed coiled shell, though the chirality of a number of other studied gastropod species are known to be controlled by gene variants.

== Sinistral snails ==
Jeremy was an example of a rare sinistral snail in a species that usually has right-handed shell-coiling. Such snail kings are individual snails whose shell winds in the opposite direction given the standard for the specific snail species. For instance, in the case of garden snails, snail kings feature sinistral helices instead of the more common dextral helices; this is referred to as 'situs inversus'. For garden snails, researchers estimate the occurrence frequency of snail kings at 1:40,000 individuals. However, in some other species of snail, the counterclockwise shell-coiling is quite common, and in a few cases the more uncommon shell coiling is the right-hand (clockwise) direction.

Snail kings may occur after the mating of two dextral helix snails (with the offspring of these snails continuing to be sinistral) and are therefore considered to be a highly illustrative example that heredity patterns are not purely dominant–recessive.

In snail species that demonstrate both coil directions, "coiling direction is determined by a single gene with delayed maternal inheritance". In other words, a snail's coiling genotype does not determine its own coil direction, but only its children's should it become the mother.

== Cultural depictions ==
Jeremy is depicted in the manga Wild Love: A BL Guide to the Animal Kingdom by Tsubuko Aratama. A yonkoma four-panel comic strip depicts Jeremy both as a snail and as an anthropomorphic human.

== See also ==
- Gastropod shell
- Gastropoda
- Land snails
- Mating of gastropods
- Ned (snail), another famous snail with a left-spiralling shell that had a campaign to find a mate
- Terrestrial mollusc
