= Ben Garrod =

English evolutionary biologist, primatologist and broadcaster

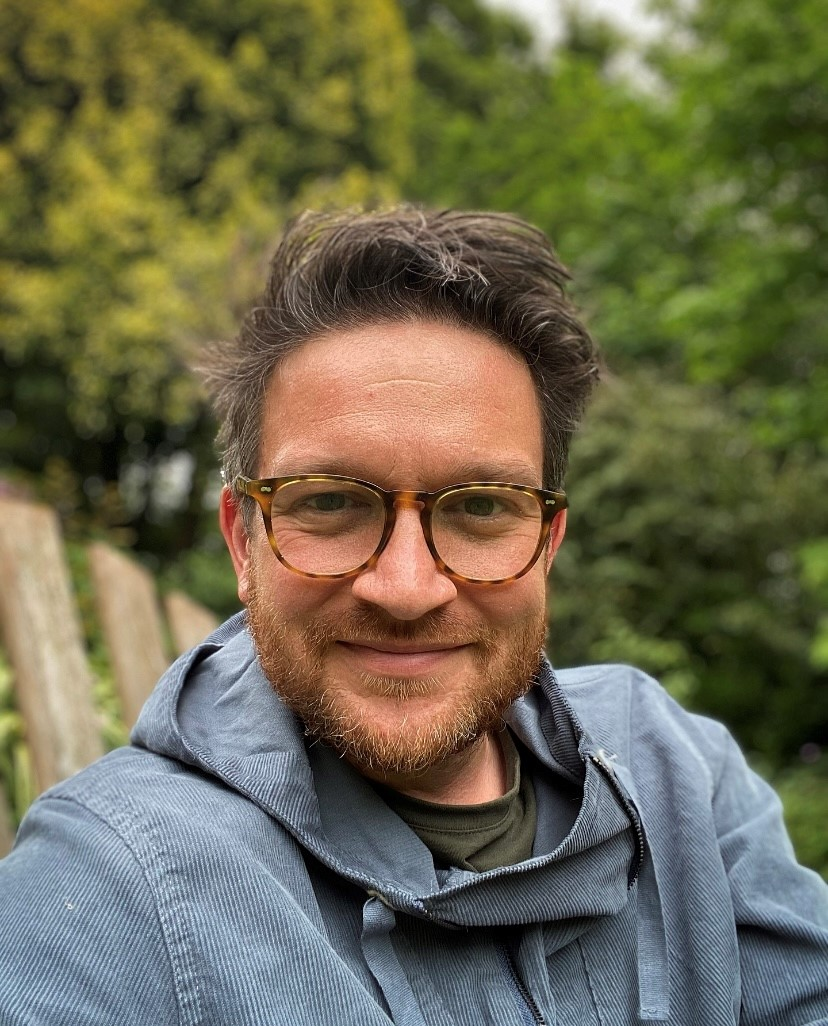
- Born: 29 January 1982 (age 44); Great Yarmouth, England
- Education: Anglia Ruskin University; Royal Veterinary College; University College London
- Known for: Secrets of Bones; Attenborough and the Giant Dinosaur
- Scientific career
- Fields: Evolutionary Biologist; Primatologist; Conservationist; Broadcaster
- Workplaces: University of East Anglia; British Broadcasting Corporation; University of Bristol; Anglia Ruskin University
- Thesis: Primates of the Caribbean : using historical-era introduction of monkeys in the Lesser Antilles to understand patterns of island evolution (2017)
- Doctoral advisor: Helen Chatterjee
- Website: www.bengarrod.co.uk

Professor Ben Garrod (born 29 January 1982) is an English evolutionary biologist and primatologist known for his work on great ape conservation. He is also an author and television presenter who regularly appears as a science presenter on BBC programmes. Garrod has been a Professor of Evolutionary Biology and Science Engagement at the University of East Anglia since 2019.

== Early life ==
Garrod was born in Great Yarmouth, where he lived in the Elephant and Castle pub and attended East Norfolk Sixth Form College.

== Career and research ==
=== Academic and conservation work ===
Garrod attended Anglia Ruskin University, where he completed his BSc (Hons) in Animal Behaviour in 2005. He completed an MSc in Wild Animal Biology at the Royal Veterinary College. Garrod completed a doctorate at University College London and the Zoological Society of London. His thesis focused on the evolution of monkeys in tropical islands and was titled "Primates of the Caribbean". He has published academic article spanning primate pathology and osteoarchaeology.

Garrod spent several years in western Uganda working on the development and management of a leading field site for chimpanzee conservation with the Jane Goodall Institute, where among other things he was responsible for habituating wild chimpanzees. He has also worked in Southeast Asia for an orangutan conservation organisation, in Madagascar studying marine life, and in the Caribbean studying introduced monkeys.

Garrod's institutional affiliations include being a Trustee for the UK Jane Goodall Institute; Vice President for the Norfolk Wildlife Trust; Ambassador for Bristol Museum and Art Gallery; Patron of the Natural Sciences Collections Association (NatSCA); Ambassador for the Marine Conservation Society; Fellow of the Linnean Society; Patron of the Norwich Science Festival; and President of Norfolk and Norwich Naturalists Society.

Garrod is a Professor of Evolutionary Biology and Science Engagement at the University of East Anglia.

=== Public engagement ===
Garrod has presented a series and several television shows, including Attenborough and the Giant Dinosaur with David Attenborough, Baby Chimp Rescue, and Springwatch, in addition to two of his own series; Secrets of Bones and Secrets of Skin on BBC Four. Across radio and other digital audio platforms, he has fronted various series and stand-alone documentaries, including 'A Grown-Up Guide to Dinosaurs' and 'A Grown-Up Guide to Oceans' (both for Audible Original). He has presented 'Supersenses', three series of 'Wild Inside' (with Jess French), 'Bone Stories', and 'The Human Hive', all for BBC Radio Four. He has guest presented 'Inside Science' and appeared on 'The Infinite Monkey Cage', 'Curious Cases', and 'A Good Read'. He has also presented numerous short films on the One Show.

He has delivered a TEDx talk and is a regular speaker at conferences, public debates and scientific festivals, including the Cheltenham Science Festival, Hay Literary Festival, UEA Live for Kids and the Darwin Day lecture at the Milner Centre (University of Bath). He also writes scientific articles for The Guardian and The Conversation.

== Bibliography ==
Garrod has published a variety of books for children and young people including the series Ultimate Dinosaurs (including introductions from Chris Packham, Steve Backshall and Jane Goodall); The Adventures of a Dog Called Jack-Jack; Extinct: The Story of Life on Earth; and The Chimpanzee and Me.

=== Books ===
- The Chimpanzee & Me (2020)

==== Extinct: The Story of Life on Earth ====
- Hallucigenia (2021)
- Trilobite (2021)
- Dunkleosteus (2021)
- Lisowicia (2021)
- Tyrannosaurus Rex (2021)
- Megalodon (2022)
- Thylacine (2022)
- Hainan Gibbon (2022)

==== Ultimate Dinosaurs ====
- Microraptor (2023)
- Stegosaurus (2023)
- Velociraptor (2023)
- Triceratops (2023)
- Diplodocus (2023)
- Spinosaurus (2023)
- Tyrannosaurus Rex (2023)
- Ankylosaurus (2023)

==== The Adventures of a Dog called Jack-Jack ====
- Jack-Jack: A Dog in Africa (2024)
- Jack-Jack: How to Train Your Human (2024)
- Jack-Jack: Return of the Chickens (2025)
- Jack-Jack: A Dog With A Job (2025)
