= Outreach =

Provision of services to populations who lack access

Outreach Program for Women

Outreach is the activity of providing services to any population that might not otherwise have access to those services. A key component of outreach is that the group providing it is not stationary, but mobile; in other words, it involves meeting someone in need of an outreach service at the location where they are. Compared with traditional service providers, outreach services are provided closer to where people may reside, efforts are very often voluntary, and have fewer, if any, enforceable obligations. In addition to delivering services, outreach has an educational role, raising the awareness of existing services. It includes identification of under-served populations and service referral and the use of outreach tools like leaflets, newsletters, advertising stalls and displays, and dedicated events. Outreach is often meant to fill in the gap in the services provided by mainstream (often governmental) services, and is often carried out by non-profit, nongovernmental organizations.

== Categories ==
There are many different types of outreach, but they can be categorized into these four groupings: domiciliary (undertaken at individual homes), detached (undertaken in public environments and targeting individuals), peripatetic (undertaken at public or private environments and targeting organizations rather than individuals), and satellite outreach (where services are provided at a dedicated site).

== Homeless street outreach ==
The concept of street outreach to individuals that are experiencing homelessness is a classic example of a form of outreach. Those who experience homelessness have a variety of complex issues that incite the need for specific forms of care. As such, street outreach is challenging work. There are multiple governmental and non-governmental agencies that have sought to engage in this work because of the understanding that unhoused people tend to have increased barriers to access traditional services. Street outreach comes in different forms, from people walking around carrying supplies or offering resources, to mobile health clinics with teams of medical volunteers driving around and offering services. Regardless of its form, the essence of street outreach is the desire to meet people where they are at, build deep trust and connections, offer support, and reinforce the human dignity and respect that is deserving of all people. The core elements of effective street outreach include being systematic, coordinated, comprehensive, housing-focused, person-centered, trauma-informed and culturally responsive, as well as emphasizing safety and reducing harm.

== Science outreach ==
Science outreach, also called education and public outreach (EPO or E/PO) or simply public outreach, is an umbrella term for a variety of activities by research institutes, universities, and institutions such as science museums, aimed at promoting public awareness (and understanding) of science, including trust-building, and making informal contributions to science education.

== See also ==
- Chabad outreach
- Charity, Tzedakah
- Community service
- Kiruv
- Social work
