= Society for the Preservation of Natural History Collections =

The Society for the Preservation of Natural History Collections (abbreviated SPNHC, often pronounced "spinach") "is an international society whose mission is to improve the preservation, conservation and management of natural history collections to ensure their continuing value to society".

Founded in 1985, the society was created to cater to the needs of those involved in the care, management and development of natural history collections. Society activities include annual meetings, the publication of a newsletter, and an active list-serv in which members consult one another about natural history collections management issues. The mission of SPNHC continues to grow, broadly encompassing archival materials such as field notes, and new and growing efforts in digitization and mobilization of collections resources.
