= List of non-marine molluscs of the Loyalty Islands =

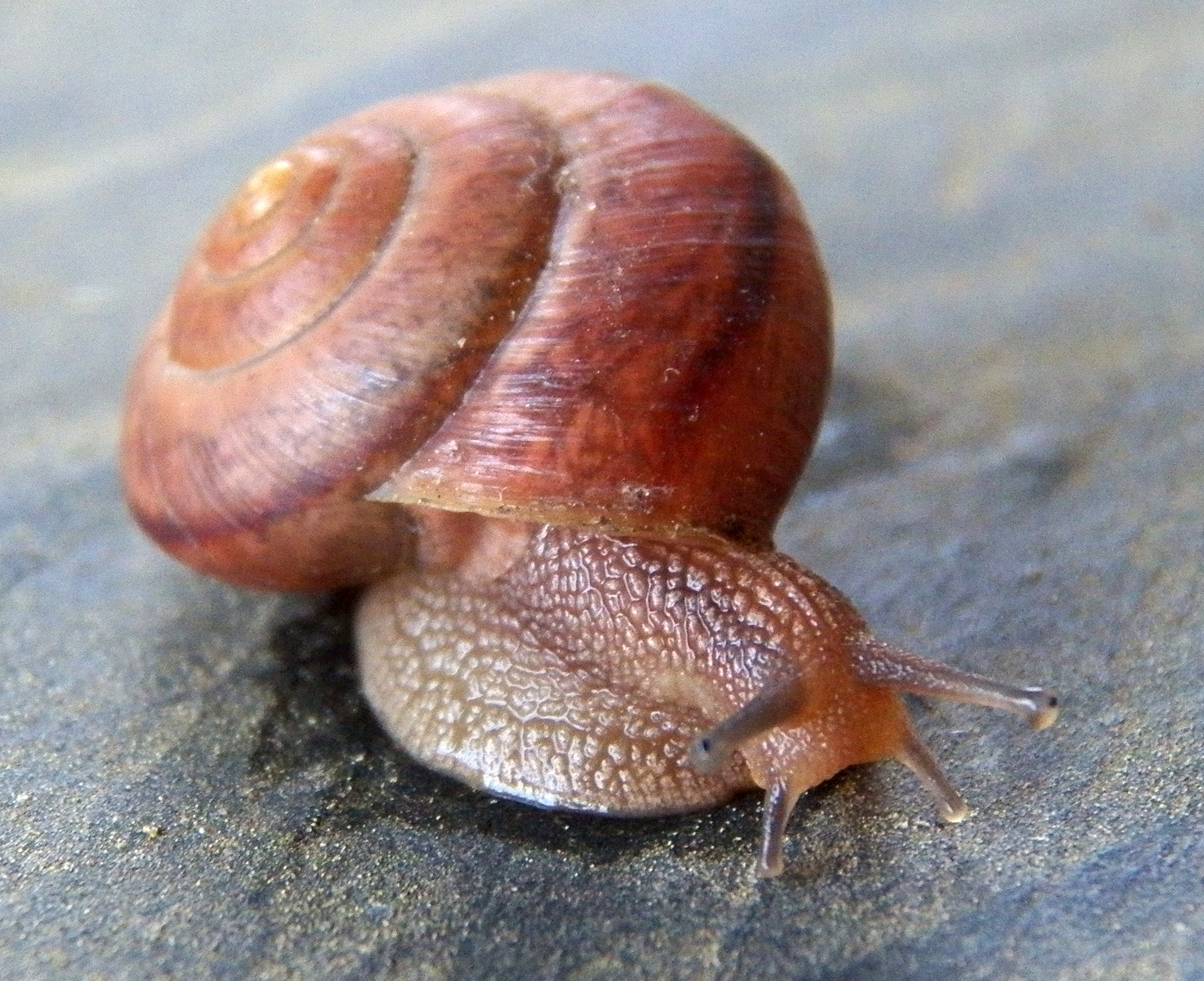
Live individual of Bradybaena similaris, the Asian trampsnail. Bradybaena similaris is a terrestrial snail found on the Loyalty Islands and is part of the family Camaenidae

The non-marine molluscs of the Loyalty Islands are a major part of the fauna located on the Loyalty Islands, off the coast of the New Caledonian mainland. There are a significant number of molluscan species found around the Loyalty Islands. Families of non-marine molluscs such as Planorbidae, Achatinellidae, Camaenidae, Cerastidae, Draparnaudiidae, Euconulidae, Gastrocoptidae, Helicinidae, Microcystidae, and Valloniidae can be found on and around the islands. Non-marine mollusc species encompass freshwater and terrestrial species.

== Freshwater species ==
Family Planorbidae

- Glyptophysa nasuta (Moreler, 1857)
- Pettancylus noumeensis (Crosse, 1871)
- Ferrissia reticulatus (Gassies, 1865)

== Terrestrial species ==
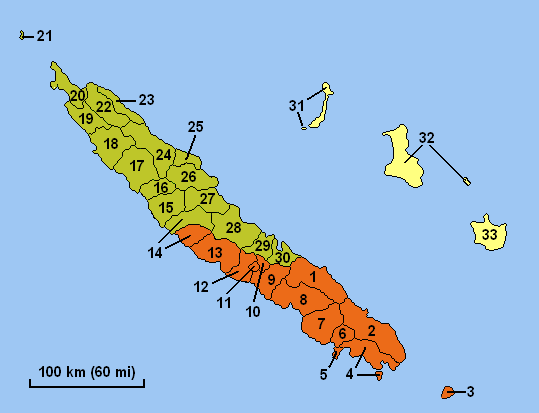
The Loyalty Islands marked as yellow on this map.

Family Achatinellidae

- Elasmias apertum (Pease, 1864)
- Elasmias mariei (Crosse, 1874)
- Tornatellinops noumeensis (Crosse, 1870)

Family Achatinidae

- Allopeas gracile (Pfeiffer, 1846)

Family Camaenidae

- Bradybaena similaris (Ferussac, 1821)

Family Cerastidae

- Rhachistia histrio (Pfeiffer, 1855)

Family Draparnaudiidae

- Draparnaudia michaudi (Pilsbry, 1901)

Family Euconulidae

- Coneuplecta calculosa (Gould, 1852)

Family Ferussaciidae

- Geostilbia aperta (Swainson, 1840)

Family Gastrocoptidae

- Gastrocopta pediculus (Shuttleworth, 1852)
- Gastrocopta servilis (Gould, 1843)

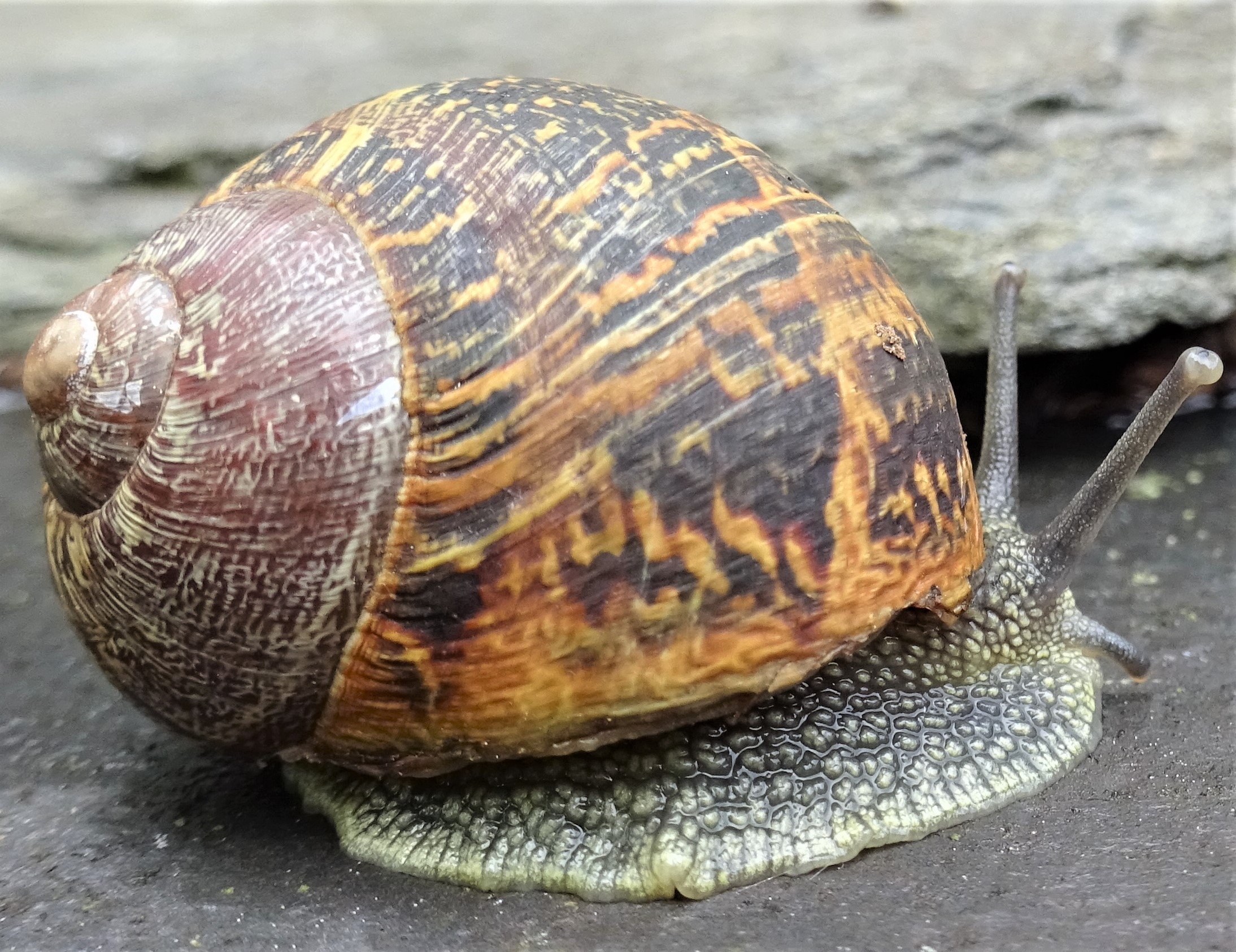
Cornu aspersum, the garden snail, of the family Helicidae.

Family Helicidae

- Cornu aspersum (O. F. Müller, 1774)

Family Helicinidae

- Sturanya mediana (Gassies, 1870)
- Sturanya sphaeroidea (Gassies, 1863)

Family Microcystidae

- Liardetia samoensis (Mousson, 1865)
- Diastole conula (Pease, 1861)

Family Valloniidae

- Pupisoma dioscoricola (C. B. Adams, 1845)

Family Veronicellidae

- Laevicaulis alte (Férussac, 1822)
- Sarasinula plebeia (P. Fischer, 1868)

== See also ==
- List of non-marine molluscs of New Caledonia
- List of marine mollusks of New Caledonia
- List of non-marine molluscs of Australia
