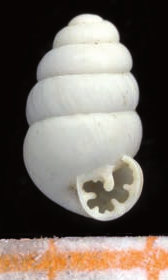
- Fossil shell of Gastrocopta moravica oligodonta from a Viernheim research borehole. Scale bar is 1 mm.

Scientific classification
- Domain: Eukaryota
- Kingdom: Animalia
- Phylum: Mollusca
- Class: Gastropoda
- Order: Stylommatophora
- Family: Gastrocoptidae
- Genus: Gastrocopta
- Species: G. moravica

Binomial name
- Gastrocopta moravica (Petrbok, 1959)

Synonyms
- Vertigo moravica Petrbok, 1959

= Gastrocopta moravica =

Gastrocopta moravica Temporal range: Pliocene–Lower Pleistocene

Extinct species of gastropod

Gastrocopta moravica is a fossil species of very small air-breathing land snail, a terrestrial pulmonate gastropod mollusc in the family Gastrocoptidae.

This species is known from the Upper Pliocene to the Early Pleistocene. Gastrocopta moravica (together with Gastrocopta serotina) is chronostratigraphically significant as an index fossil for the Late Tiglian (= Gelasian, within the Early Pleistocene).

== Subspecies ==
- Gastrocopta moravica oligodonta (Krolopp, 1979) - the shell is less conical than the nominate form. The intraparietal tooth of the aperture is reduced to a thickening at one point.

== Distribution ==
The type locality of Gastrocopta moravica is a cave near Hlubné near Ochoz u Brna, Moravský Kras, the Czech Republic.

Records of this species include the Czech Republic, Hungary (locality Rábaszentandrás), Germany and France (locality Cessey-sur-Tille).

Krolopp (1979) found Gastrocopta moravica oligodonta together with Gastrocopta serotina in Hungary near Szabádhidvég. Rähle (1995) found Gastrocopta moravica oligodonta in argillaceous high flood deposits in Uhlenberg (Iller-Lech Plate, Bavarian Swabia). Wedel (2008) found Gastrocopta moravica oligodonta in Viernheim research borehole, Germany.
