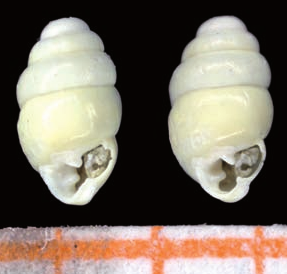
- Two views of one shell of Gastrocopta new species from the Viernheim research borehole, Scale bar is in mm

Scientific classification
- Kingdom: Animalia
- Phylum: Mollusca
- Class: Gastropoda
- Order: Stylommatophora
- Family: Gastrocoptidae
- Genus: Gastrocopta
- Species: G. sp. Viernheim

Binomial name
- Gastrocopta sp. Viernheim

= Gastrocopta sp. Viernheim =

Gastrocopta sp. Viernheim Temporal range: Lower Pleistocene

Species of gastropod

Gastrocopta sp. from the Viernheim borehole is an undescribed species of a very small fossil land snail, a terrestrial pulmonate gastropod mollusc in the family Gastrocoptidae.

== Distribution ==
There is only one record of this species from 2008 from the Viernheim research borehole, Germany from the Lower Pleistocene (Lower Biharium).

== Description ==
The small conical shell is 1.9 mm high and 1.0 mm wide. The five arched whorls increase uniformly in size up to the penultimate whorl – the last whorl becomes smaller towards the aperture. The apertural border with the lip is well formed and slightly folded over towards the spindle. The shell is shiny, slightly stripy and has a weakly developed palatine torus. It has three strong teeth, one columellar, one palatal and one parietal, although the adjacent palatine wall of the specimen is damaged and partially missing. The teeth are almost the same distance apart and their tips almost point towards one another. A characteristic feature is the complete absence of a basal tooth.
