= Neku =

Neku may refer to:

- Neku language, an Oceanic language of New Caledonia
- Neku Sakuraba, a fictional character in The World Ends with You
- Neku Siyar (c.1671–1723), claimant to the throne of India
- Neku Atawodi-Edun (b. 1987), Nigerian polo player
- Hemistomia neku, a species of freshwater snail
- Neku, a Nepali musical instrument
- Necho or Neku, the name of two Egyptian pharaohs of the 26th dynasty
