= Draparnaudia subnecata =

Conservation status
- Critically Endangered (IUCN 2.3)

Scientific classification
- Kingdom: Animalia
- Phylum: Mollusca
- Class: Gastropoda
- Order: Stylommatophora
- Family: Draparnaudiidae
- Genus: Draparnaudia
- Species: D. subnecata

Binomial name
- Draparnaudia subnecata Tillier & Mordan, 1995

Species of gastropod

Draparnaudia subnecata is a species of air-breathing land snail, terrestrial pulmonate gastropod mollusk in the superfamily Pupilloidea. This species is endemic to New Caledonia.
