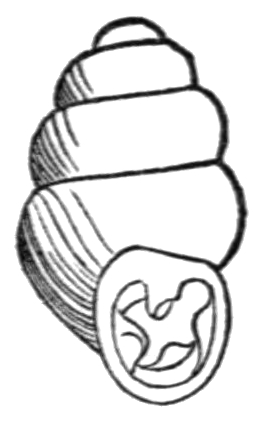
- Apertural view of a shell of Gastrocopta contracta

Conservation status
- Secure (NatureServe)

Scientific classification
- Kingdom: Animalia
- Phylum: Mollusca
- Class: Gastropoda
- Order: Stylommatophora
- Family: Gastrocoptidae
- Genus: Gastrocopta
- Species: G. contracta

Binomial name
- Gastrocopta contracta (Say, 1822)

Synonyms
- Bifidaria contracta

= Gastrocopta contracta =

Species of gastropod

Gastrocopta contracta, common name the bottleneck snaggletooth, is a species of very small air-breathing land snail, a terrestrial pulmonate gastropod mollusc in the family Gastrocoptidae.

== Distribution ==
This species occurs in eastern North America from Mexico to the United States, east of the Rocky Mountains, and in Canada in Manitoba (at Carberry) Canada.
