= Draparnaudia anniae =

Conservation status
- Critically Endangered (IUCN 2.3)

Scientific classification
- Kingdom: Animalia
- Phylum: Mollusca
- Class: Gastropoda
- Order: Stylommatophora
- Family: Draparnaudiidae
- Genus: Draparnaudia
- Species: D. anniae

Binomial name
- Draparnaudia anniae Tillier & Mordan, 1995

Species of gastropod

Draparnaudia anniae is a species of air-breathing land snail, a terrestrial pulmonate gastropod mollusk in the family Draparnaudiidae.

== Distribution ==
This species is endemic to New Caledonia in Melanesia.
