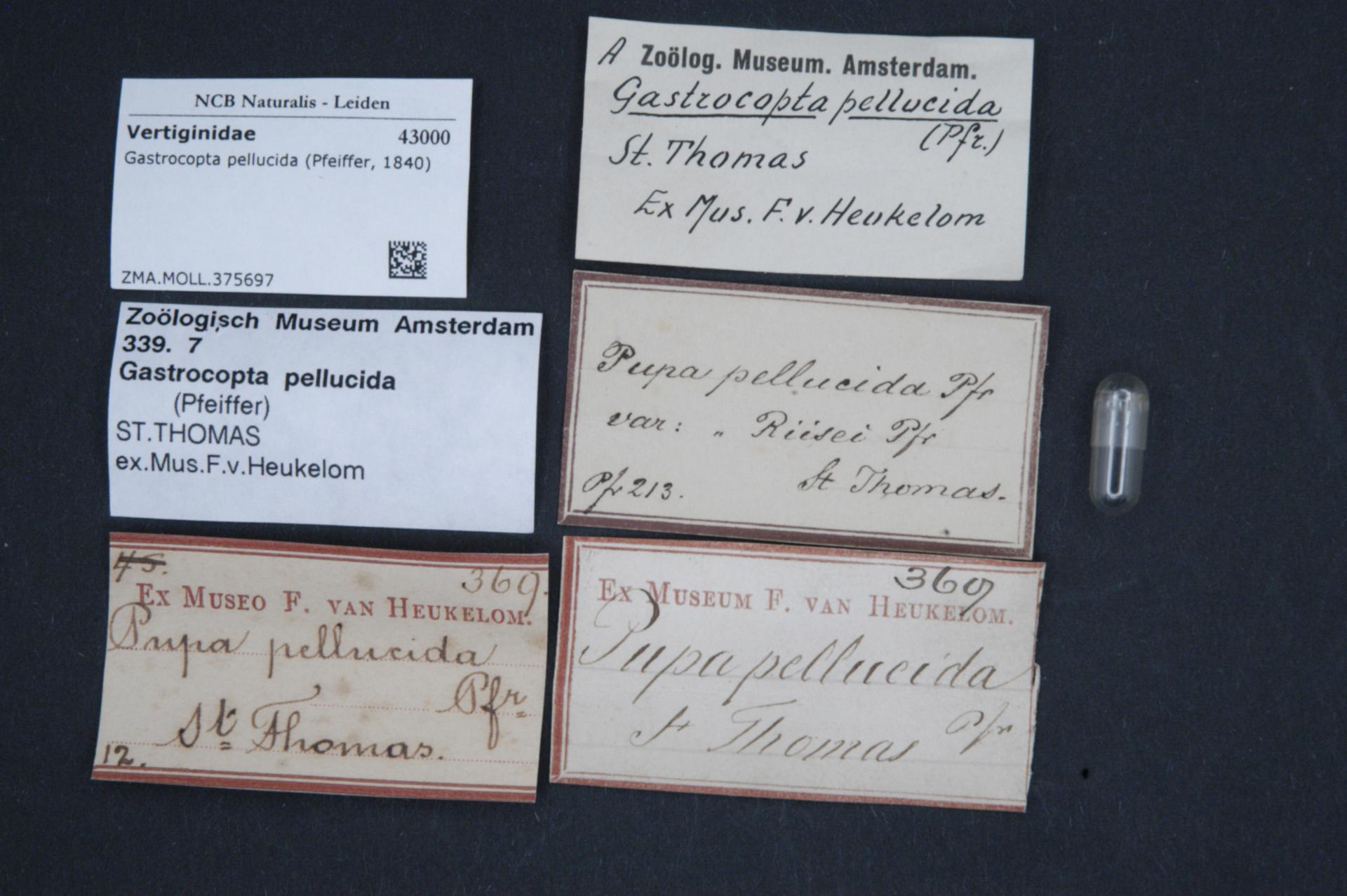

Conservation status
- Secure (NatureServe)

Scientific classification
- Kingdom: Animalia
- Phylum: Mollusca
- Class: Gastropoda
- Order: Stylommatophora
- Family: Gastrocoptidae
- Genus: Gastrocopta
- Species: G. pellucida

Binomial name
- Gastrocopta pellucida (Pfeiffer, 1840)

= Gastrocopta pellucida =

Species of gastropod

Gastrocopta pellucida is a species of small air-breathing land snail, a terrestrial pulmonate gastropod mollusc or micromollusk in the family Gastrocoptidae.

== Subspecies ==
Subspecies within this species include:

- Gastrocopta pellucida hordeacella (Pilsbry)
- Gastrocopta pellucida parvidens (MacMillan, 1946) - slim snaggletooth
