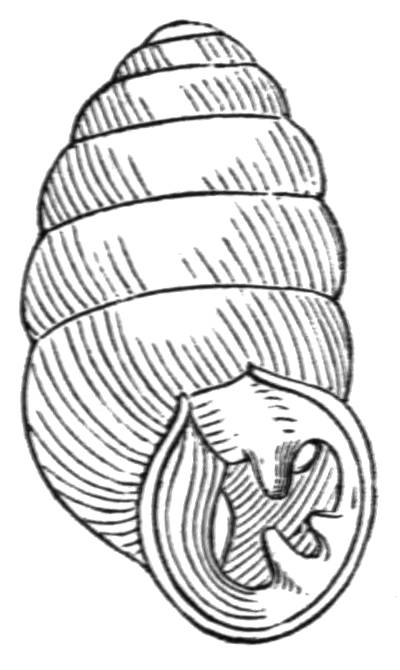
- An apertural view of a shell of Gastrocopta armifera

Conservation status
- Secure (NatureServe)

Scientific classification
- Kingdom: Animalia
- Phylum: Mollusca
- Class: Gastropoda
- Order: Stylommatophora
- Family: Gastrocoptidae
- Genus: Gastrocopta
- Species: G. armifera

Binomial name
- Gastrocopta armifera (Say, 1821)

Synonyms
- Bifidaria armifera

= Gastrocopta armifera =

Species of gastropod

Gastrocopta armifera, the armed snaggletooth, is a species of very small air-breathing land snail, a terrestrial pulmonate gastropod mollusc in the family Gastrocoptidae.

== Distribution ==
This species occurs in the United States east of the Rocky Mountains, and in Canada in Alberta (at Red Deer), and Manitoba (at Brandon).
