= Gastrocopta klunzingeri =

Scientific classification
- Kingdom: Animalia
- Phylum: Mollusca
- Class: Gastropoda
- Order: Stylommatophora
- Family: Gastrocoptidae
- Genus: Gastrocopta
- Species: G. klunzingeri

Binomial name
- Gastrocopta klunzingeri (Jickeli, 1873)

Species of gastropod

Gastrocopta klunzingeri is a species of gastropods belonging to the family Gastrocoptidae.

The species is found in Africa. The species inhabits terrestrial environments.
