= Gastrocopta boninensis =

Conservation status
- Vulnerable (IUCN 2.3)

Scientific classification
- Kingdom: Animalia
- Phylum: Mollusca
- Class: Gastropoda
- Order: Stylommatophora
- Family: Gastrocoptidae
- Genus: Gastrocopta
- Species: G. boninensis

Binomial name
- Gastrocopta boninensis Pilsbry, 1916

Species of gastropod

Gastrocopta boninensis is a species of very small air-breathing land snail, a terrestrial pulmonate gastropod mollusc in the family Gastrocoptidae, the whorl snails. This species is endemic to Japan.
