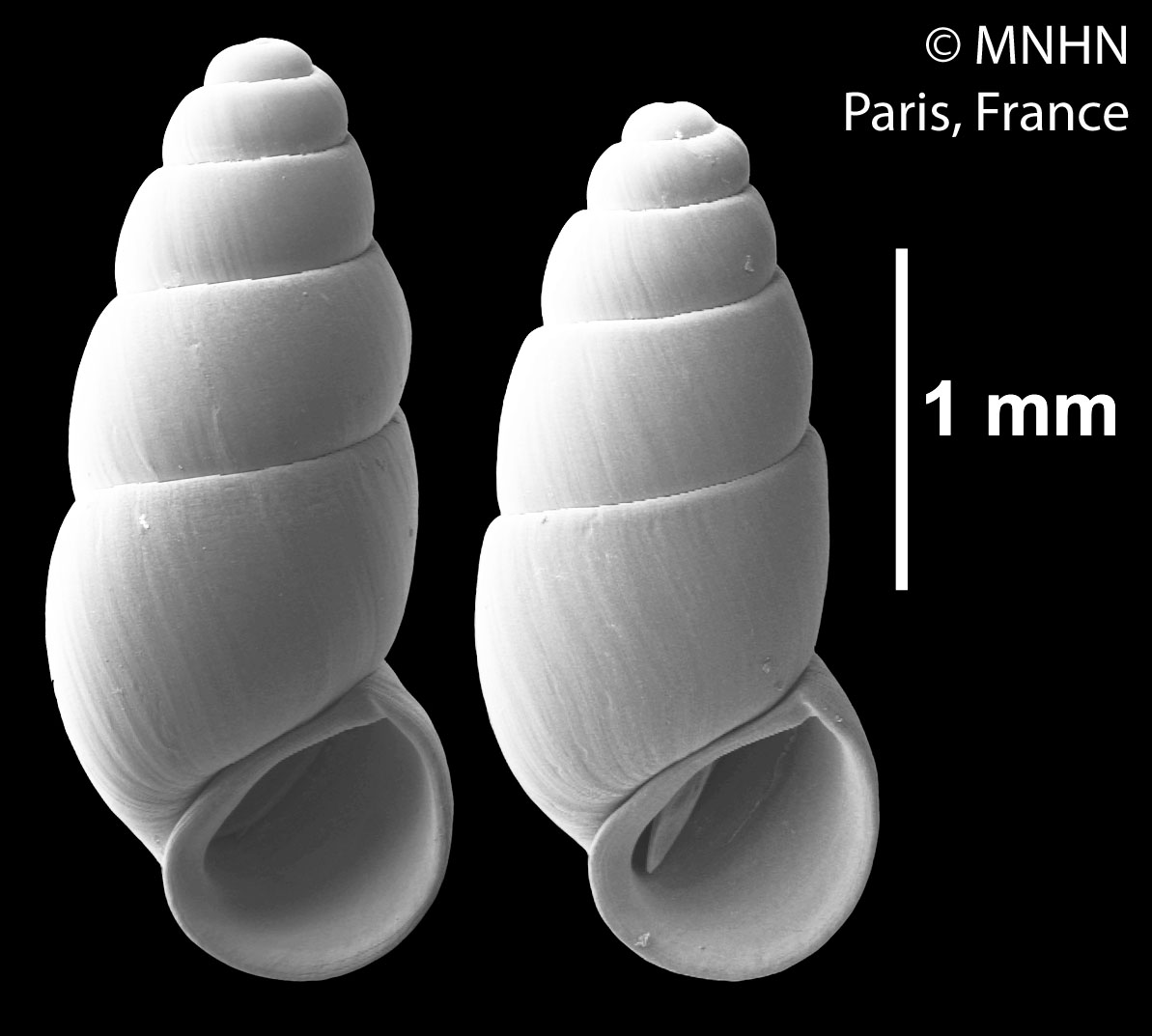
- Shell of Hemistomia andreae (paratype at MNHN, Paris)

Scientific classification
- Kingdom: Animalia
- Phylum: Mollusca
- Class: Gastropoda
- Subclass: Caenogastropoda
- Order: Littorinimorpha
- Family: Tateidae
- Genus: Hemistomia; Crosse, 1872

Type species
- Hemistomia caledonica Crosse, 1872

= Hemistomia =

Genus of gastropods

Hemistomia is a genus of minute freshwater snails with an operculum, aquatic gastropod molluscs or micromolluscs in the family Tateidae.

== Species ==
Species within the genus Hemistomia include:

- Hemistomia andreae Haase & Zielske, 2015
- Hemistomia aquilonaris Haase & Bouchet, 1998
- Hemistomia beaumonti Ponder, 1982
- Hemistomia caledonica Crosse, 1872
- Hemistomia cautium Haase & Bouchet, 1998
- Hemistomia cockerelli Haase & Bouchet, 1998
- Hemistomia drubea Haase & Bouchet, 1998
- Hemistomia dystherata Haase & Bouchet, 1998
- Hemistomia eclima Haase & Bouchet, 1998
- Hemistomia fabrorum Haase & Bouchet, 1998
- Hemistomia flexicolumella Ponder, 1982
- Hemistomia fluminis Cockerell, 1930
- Hemistomia fridayi Haase & Bouchet, 1998
- Hemistomia gemma Ponder, 1982
- Hemistomia gorotitei Haase & Bouchet, 1998
- Hemistomia hansi Haase & Bouchet, 1998
- Hemistomia huliwa Haase & Bouchet, 1998
- Hemistomia lacinia Haase & Bouchet, 1998
- Hemistomia minor Haase & Bouchet, 1998
- Hemistomia minutissima Ponder, 1982
- Hemistomia napaia Haase & Bouchet, 1998
- Hemistomia neku Haase & Bouchet, 1998
- Hemistomia nyo Haase & Bouchet, 1998
- Hemistomia obeliscus Haase & Bouchet, 1998
- Hemistomia oxychila Haase & Bouchet, 1998
- Hemistomia pusillior (Iredale, 1944)
- Hemistomia pygmaea van Benthem Jutting, 1963
- Hemistomia rusticorum Haase & Bouchet, 1998
- Hemistomia saxifica Haase & Bouchet, 1998
- Hemistomia shostakovichi Haase & Bouchet, 1998
- Hemistomia ultima Haase & Bouchet, 1998
- Hemistomia whiteleggei (Brazier, 1889)
- Hemistomia winstonefi Haase & Bouchet, 1998
- Hemistomia xaracuu Haase & Bouchet, 1998
- Hemistomia yalayu Haase & Bouchet, 1998
- Hemistomia yuaga Haase & Bouchet, 1998

Species brought into synonymy

- Hemistomia crosseana(Gassies, 1874): synonym of Crosseana crosseana (Gassies, 1874)
- Hemistomia fallax Haase & Bouchet, 1998: synonym of Crosseana fallax (Haase & Bouchet, 1998) (original combination)
- Hemistomia melanosoma Haase & Bouchet, 1998: synonym of Crosseana melanosoma (Haase & Bouchet, 1998) (original combination)
