= Kaya Kinkel =

German politician from Alliance 90/The Greens

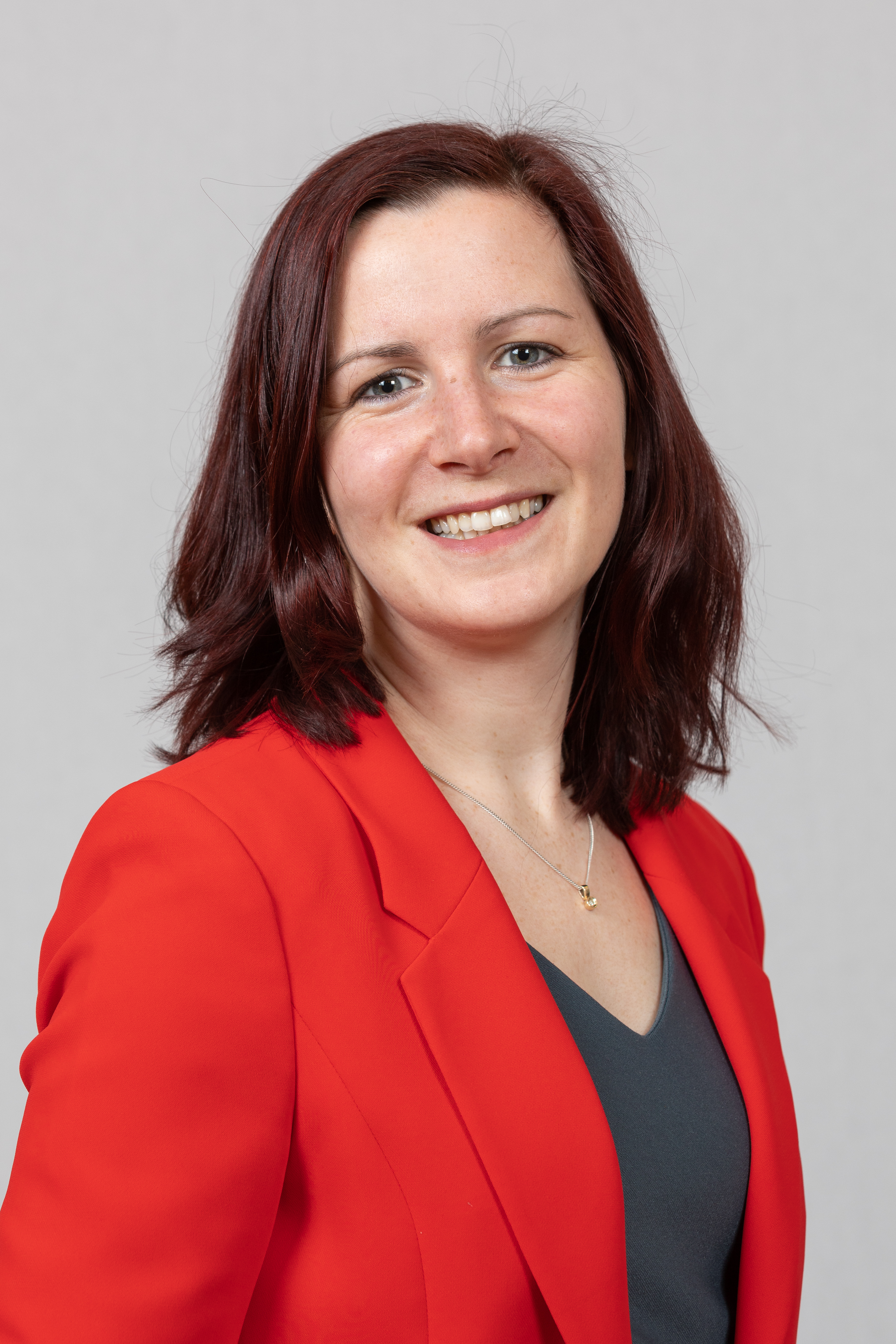
- Kinkel in 2019

Members of the Landtag of Hesse
- Incumbent
- Assumed office Since October 2017
- Preceded by: Kai Klose

Personal details
- Born: Kaya Kinkel; 1987 (age 38–39) Viernheim, Germany
- Party: Alliance 90/The Greens

Kaya Kinkel (born 22 August 1987 in Viernheim) is a German politician from Alliance 90/The Greens. She has been a member of the Hesse State Parliament since 2017.

== Life ==
Kaya Kinkel finished her high school diploma in Rotenburg an der Fulda. She studied Media Business at the Technischen Universität Ilmenau as Bachelor and then moved to University of Kassel, where she graduated with a master's degree in "Sustainable Management". She worked for municipality of Kassel city after graduation.

== Politics ==
Kinkel is a member of Alliance 90/The Greens and the leader of her party's parliamentary group in the district council of Hersfeld-Rotenburg. Kinkel replaced Kai Klose, who had resigned, in the Hesse state parliament on October 1, 2017. In the 2018 Hessian state election she ran as a candidate in the Hersfeld constituency and entered the parliament again via the state list of her party. In the state parliament, she is a member of the Committee on Economy, Energy, Transport and Housing. In December 2022, the members of Alliance 90/The Greens elected Kaya Kinkel as a candidate for the constituency 11 Hersfeld for the next state elections in 2023.
