= Hemistomia lacinia =

Conservation status
- Critically Endangered (IUCN 3.1)

Scientific classification
- Kingdom: Animalia
- Phylum: Mollusca
- Class: Gastropoda
- Subclass: Caenogastropoda
- Order: Littorinimorpha
- Family: Tateidae
- Genus: Hemistomia
- Species: H. lacinia

Binomial name
- Hemistomia lacinia Haase & Bouchet, 1998

Species of gastropod

Hemistomia lacinia is a species of small freshwater snail with an operculum, an aquatic gastropod mollusc or micromollusc in the family Tateidae. This species is endemic to New Caledonia, where it is currently only known from its type locality at Mt. Nogouta, a hill in Païta, northwest of Nouméa.

== See also ==
- List of non-marine molluscs of New Caledonia
