= Hemistomia aquilonaris =

Conservation status
- Critically Endangered (IUCN 3.1)

Scientific classification
- Kingdom: Animalia
- Phylum: Mollusca
- Class: Gastropoda
- Subclass: Caenogastropoda
- Order: Littorinimorpha
- Family: Tateidae
- Genus: Hemistomia
- Species: H. aquilonaris

Binomial name
- Hemistomia aquilonaris Haase & Bouchet, 1998

Species of gastropod

Hemistomia aquilonaris is a species of small freshwater snail with an operculum, an aquatic gastropod mollusc or micromollusc in the family Tateidae. This species is endemic to a single spring in Vallee des Palmiers, Ouehat, Koumac, in the north of New Caledonia.

== See also ==
- List of non-marine molluscs of New Caledonia
