= Hemistomia napaia =

Conservation status
- Vulnerable (IUCN 3.1)

Scientific classification
- Kingdom: Animalia
- Phylum: Mollusca
- Class: Gastropoda
- Subclass: Caenogastropoda
- Order: Littorinimorpha
- Family: Tateidae
- Genus: Hemistomia
- Species: H. napaia

Binomial name
- Hemistomia napaia Haase & Bouchet, 1998

Species of gastropod

Hemistomia napaia is a species of small freshwater snail with an operculum, an aquatic gastropod mollusc or micromollusc in the family Tateidae. This species is endemic to New Caledonia, where it is only known from one seepage in a rainforest in Tendea, Farino.

== See also ==
- List of non-marine molluscs of New Caledonia
