= Hemistomia gorotitei =

Conservation status
- Critically Endangered (IUCN 3.1)

Scientific classification
- Kingdom: Animalia
- Phylum: Mollusca
- Class: Gastropoda
- Subclass: Caenogastropoda
- Order: Littorinimorpha
- Family: Tateidae
- Genus: Hemistomia
- Species: H. gorotitei

Binomial name
- Hemistomia gorotitei Haase & Bouchet, 1998

Species of gastropod

Hemistomia gorotitei is a species of small freshwater snail with an operculum, an aquatic gastropod mollusc or micromollusc in the family Tateidae. This species is endemic to New Caledonia, where it is currently only known from a few specimens collected from a headwater in the Poya drainage.

== See also ==
- List of non-marine molluscs of New Caledonia
