= Bundesautobahn 659 =

Federal motorway in Germany

A 659
- Bundesautobahn 659
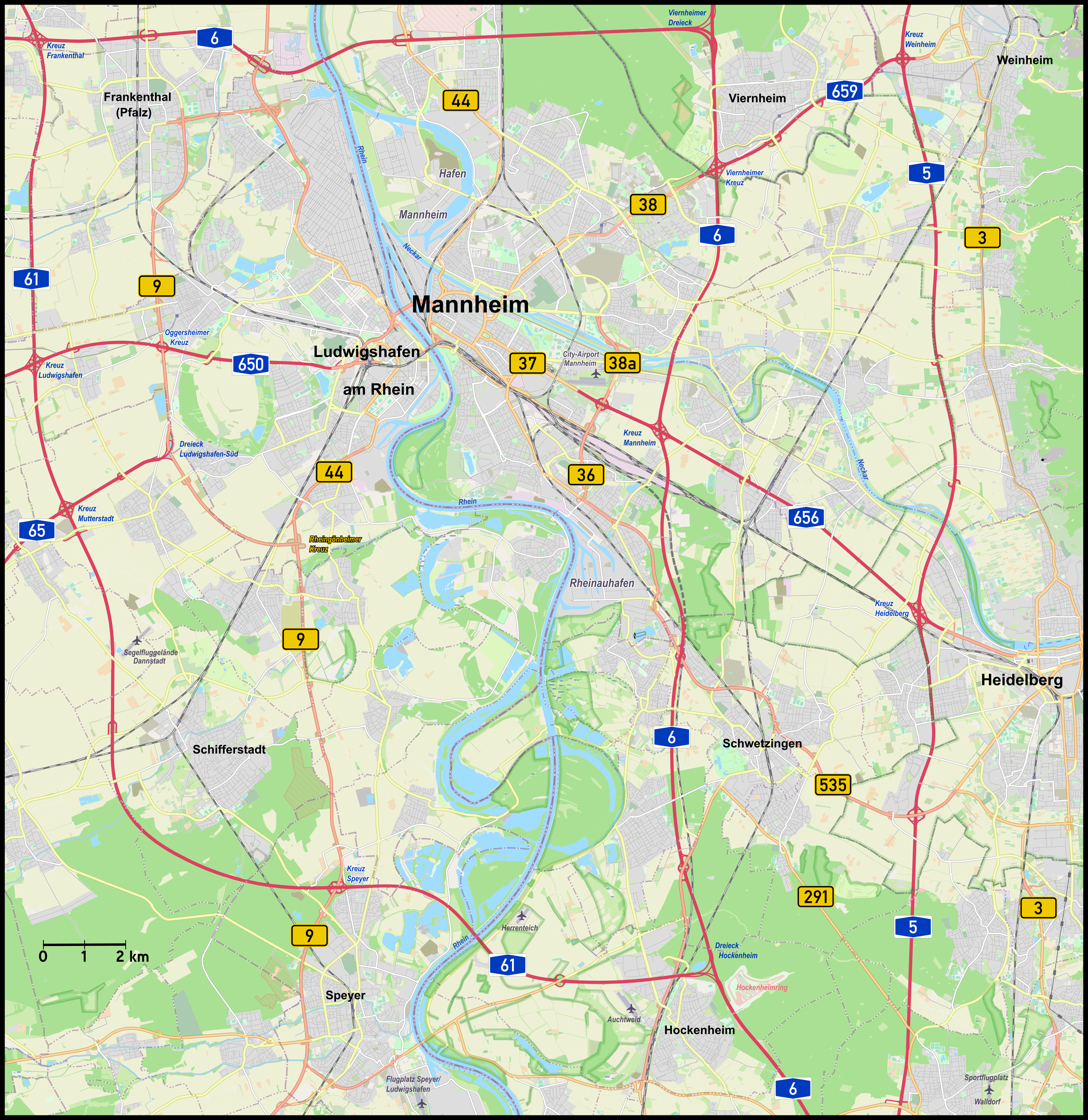

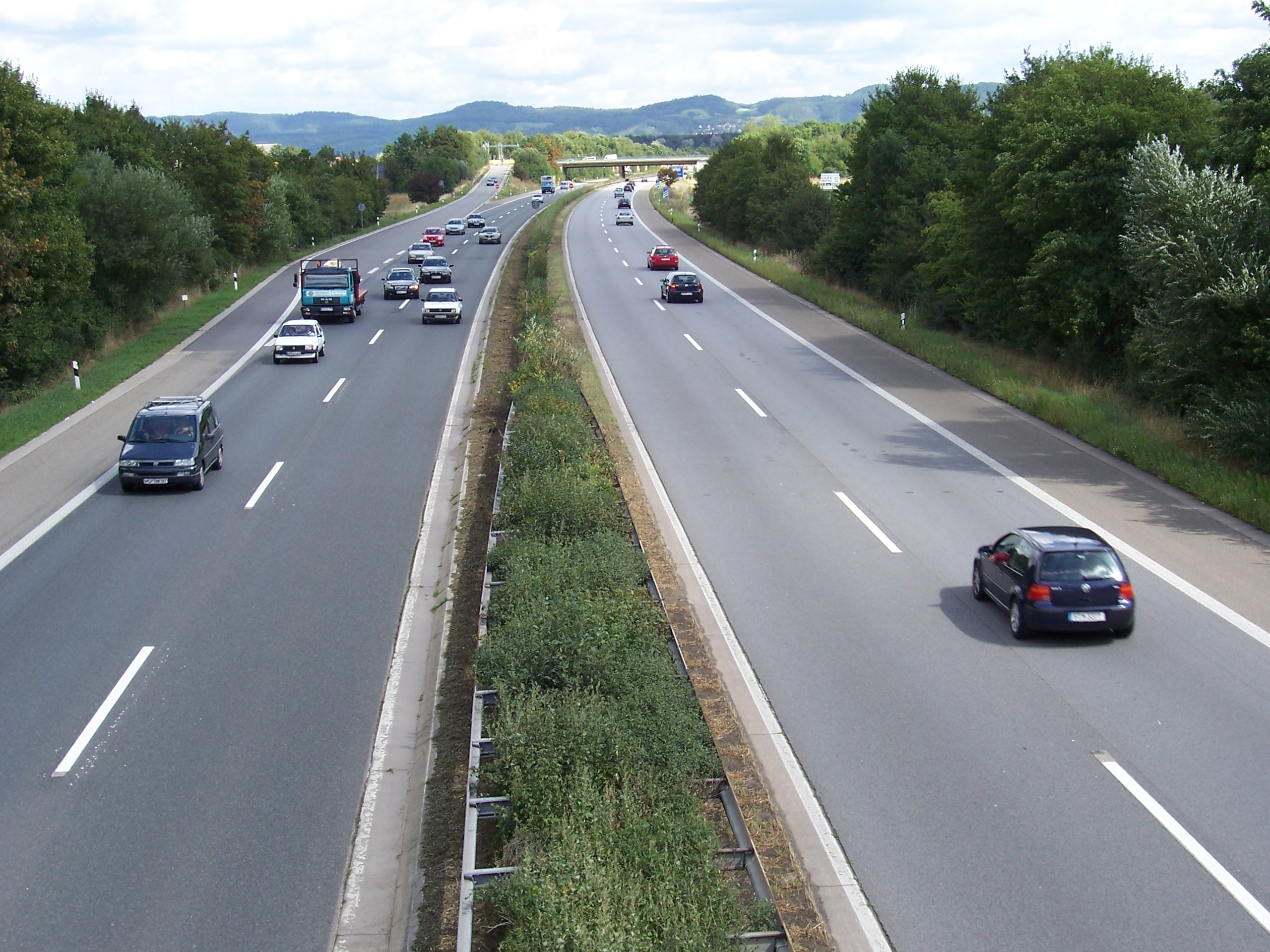

Route information
- Length: 6 km (3.7 mi)

Major junctions
- West end: Viernheim
- East end: Weinheim

Location
- Country: Germany
- States: Baden-Württemberg, Hesse

Highway system
- Roads in Germany; Autobahns; List; Federal; List; State; E-roads

Bundesautobahn 659 (translates from German as Federal Motorway 659, short form Autobahn 659, abbreviated as BAB 659 or A 659) is an autobahn in Germany.

The A 659 connects the A 5 Bergstraßenautobahn to Mannheim. Upon the autobahn's completion in the 1960s, the stretch of B 38 along the autobahn's path was replaced, although the B 38 still continues from both of the A 659's termini.

== Exit list ==
B 38	Road continues as the B 38 towards Fürth
(1)	Weinheim A 5 E35
	Tankstelle Viernheim; Southbound only
(2)	Viernheim-Ost
(3)	Viernheim
	Tankstelle Viernheim; Northbound only
(4)	Viernheimer Kreuz A 6 E50
B 38	Road continues as the B 38 into Mannheim
