= Hemistomia pusillior =

Conservation status
- Endangered (IUCN 2.3)

Scientific classification
- Kingdom: Animalia
- Phylum: Mollusca
- Class: Gastropoda
- Subclass: Caenogastropoda
- Order: Littorinimorpha
- Family: Tateidae
- Genus: Hemistomia
- Species: H. pusillior

Binomial name
- Hemistomia pusillior (Iredale, 1944)

Species of gastropod

Hemistomia pusillior is a species of small freshwater snail with an operculum, aquatic gastropod molluscs or micromolluscs in the family Tateidae. This species is endemic to Australia.
