= Hemistomia shostakovichi =

Conservation status
- Critically Endangered (IUCN 3.1)

Scientific classification
- Kingdom: Animalia
- Phylum: Mollusca
- Class: Gastropoda
- Subclass: Caenogastropoda
- Order: Littorinimorpha
- Family: Tateidae
- Genus: Hemistomia
- Species: H. shostakovichi

Binomial name
- Hemistomia shostakovichi Haase & Bouchet, 1998

Species of gastropod

Hemistomia shostakovichi is a species of small freshwater snail with an operculum, an aquatic gastropod mollusc or micromollusc in the family Tateidae. This species is endemic to New Caledonia, where it is only known from one small seepage behind a micro-dam in a dry valley near Voh.

== See also ==
- List of non-marine molluscs of New Caledonia
