= Hemistomia yalayu =

Conservation status
- Critically Endangered (IUCN 3.1)

Scientific classification
- Kingdom: Animalia
- Phylum: Mollusca
- Class: Gastropoda
- Subclass: Caenogastropoda
- Order: Littorinimorpha
- Family: Tateidae
- Genus: Hemistomia
- Species: H. yalayu

Binomial name
- Hemistomia yalayu Haase & Bouchet, 1998

Species of gastropod

Hemistomia yalayu is a species of minute freshwater snail with an operculum, an aquatic gastropod mollusc or micromollusc in the family Tateidae. This species is endemic to New Caledonia, where it is only known from its type locality on the north east slope of Col d’Amoss, Pouébo.

== See also ==
- List of non-marine molluscs of New Caledonia
