= Crosseana =

Scientific classification
- Kingdom: Animalia
- Phylum: Mollusca
- Class: Gastropoda
- Subclass: Caenogastropoda
- Order: Littorinimorpha
- Family: Tateidae
- Genus: Crosseana; Zielske & Haase, 2015

Type species
- Hydrobia crosseana Gassies, 1874

Genus of gastropods

Crosseana is a genus of minute freshwater snails with an operculum, aquatic gastropod molluscs or micromolluscs in the family Tateidae.

== Species ==
- Crosseana crosseana (Gassies, 1874)
- Crosseana fallax (Haase & Bouchet, 1998)
- Crosseana melanosoma (Haase & Bouchet, 1998)
