= Heterocyclus perroquini =

Conservation status
- Endangered (IUCN 2.3)

Scientific classification
- Kingdom: Animalia
- Phylum: Mollusca
- Class: Gastropoda
- Subclass: Caenogastropoda
- Order: Littorinimorpha
- Family: Tateidae
- Genus: Heterocyclus
- Species: H. perroquini

Binomial name
- Heterocyclus perroquini Crosse, 1872

Synonyms
- Heterocyclus petiti (Crosse, 1872); Lyogyrus (Heterocyclus) perroquini (Crosse, 1872) junior subjective synonym; Valvata petiti Crosse, 1872

Species of gastropod

Heterocyclus perroquini is a species of small freshwater snail with an operculum, aquatic gastropod mollusc or micromollusc in the family Tateidae.

== Distribution ==
This species is endemic to New Caledonia.
