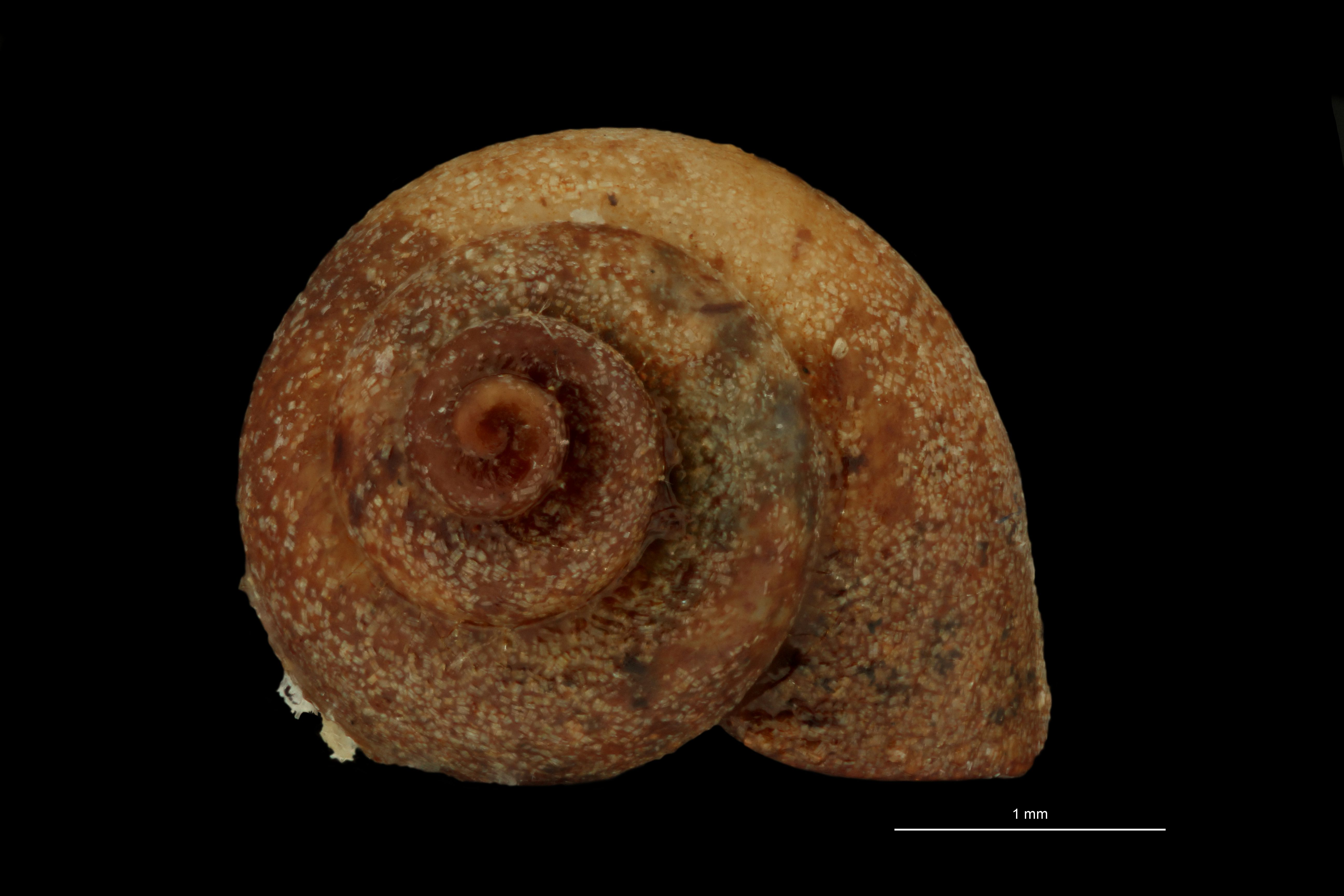
- Heterocyclus perroquini

Scientific classification
- Kingdom: Animalia
- Phylum: Mollusca
- Class: Gastropoda
- Subclass: Caenogastropoda
- Order: Littorinimorpha
- Family: Tateidae
- Genus: Heterocyclus; Crosse, 1872

= Heterocyclus =

Genus of gastropods

Heterocyclus is a genus of minute freshwater snails with an operculum, aquatic gastropod molluscs or micromolluscs in the family Tateidae.

== Species ==
Species within the genus Heterocyclus include:

- Heterocyclus perroquini (Crosse, 1872)

Synonyms

- Heterocyclus petiti (Crosse, 1872): synonym of Heterocyclus perroquini Crosse, 1872
