= Hemistomia minutissima =

Conservation status
- Least Concern (IUCN 3.1)

Scientific classification
- Kingdom: Animalia
- Phylum: Mollusca
- Class: Gastropoda
- Subclass: Caenogastropoda
- Order: Littorinimorpha
- Family: Tateidae
- Genus: Hemistomia
- Species: H. minutissima

Binomial name
- Hemistomia minutissima Ponder, 1982

Species of gastropod

Hemistomia minutissima is a species of small freshwater snail with an operculum, an aquatic gastropod mollusc or micromollusc in the family Tateidae. This species is endemic to Australia, where it is only known from the Erskine Valley, on the southern part of Lord Howe Island.
