= Balticopta =

Balticopta Temporal range: Late Eocene, Priabonian

Scientific classification
- Domain: Eukaryota
- Kingdom: Animalia
- Phylum: Mollusca
- Class: Gastropoda
- Order: Stylommatophora
- Family: Gastrocoptidae
- Genus: †Balticopta; Balashov & Perkovsky, 2020
- Species: †B. gusakovi

Binomial name
- †Balticopta gusakovi Balashov & Perkovsky, 2020

Extinct genus of gastropods

Balticopta is a fossil genus of minute air-breathing land snails, terrestrial pulmonate gastropod molluscs in the family Gastrocoptidae from Eocene Baltic amber. It includes one species, B. gusakovi.

== Links ==
- MolluscaBase - Balticopta
- ZooBank - Balticopta
