= List of non-marine molluscs of New Caledonia =

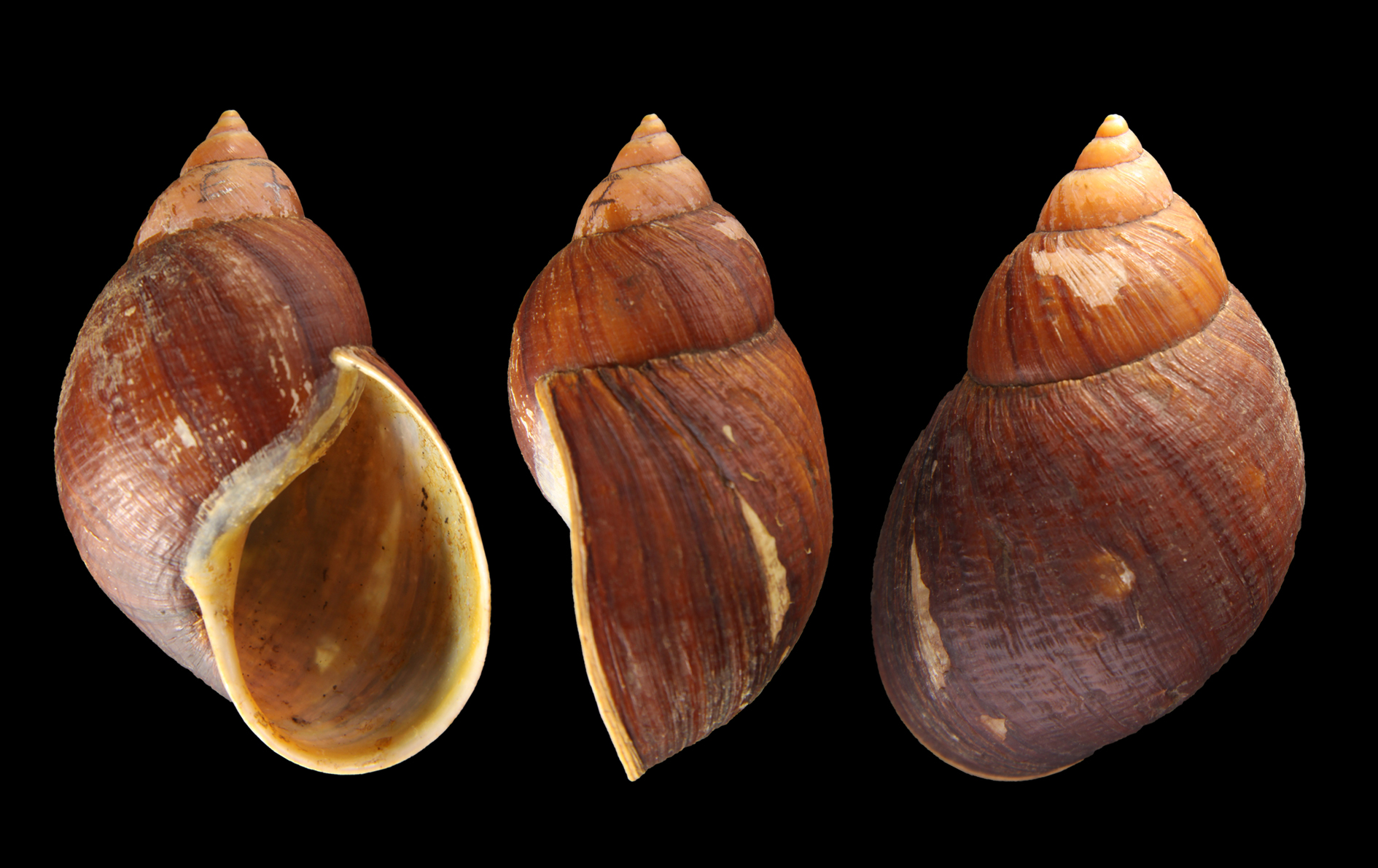
Shell of Placostylus eddystonensis, a terrestrial gastropod of the family Bothriembryontidae, endemic to New Caledonia.

The non-marine molluscs of New Caledonia are a part of the molluscan fauna of New Caledonia, with many species of freshwater and terrestrial gastropods. There are many families of molluscs found in New Caledonia, including Planorbidae, Tateidae, Bothriembryontidae, Camaenidae, Euconulidae, Gastrocoptidae, and Sagdidae.

== Freshwater gastropods ==
Family Planorbidae

- Glyptophysa petiti Crosse, 1872
- Gyraulus rossiteri Crosse, 1871
- Physastra nasuta Morelet, 1857
- Pettancylus noumeensis

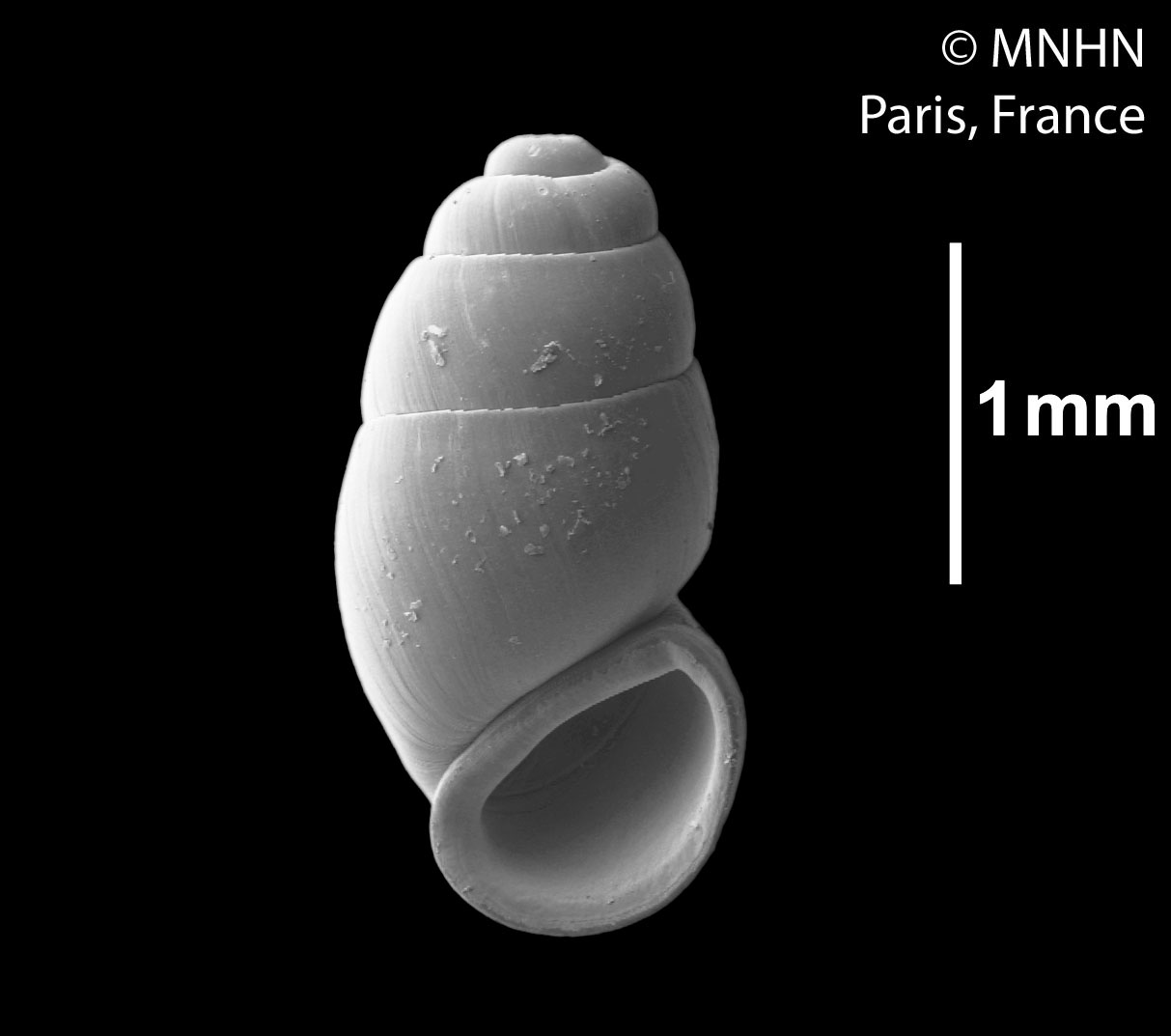
Shell of a paratype of Leiorhagium clandestinum, of the family Tateidae.

Family Tateidae

- Hemistomia andreae
- Hemistomia aquilonaris
- Hemistomia crosseana
- Hemistomia gorotitei
- Hemistomia lacinia
- Heterocyclus perroquini
- Heterocyclus petiti
- Hemistomia napaia
- Hemistomia neku
- Hemistomia shostakovichi
- Hemistomia xaracuu
- Hemistomia yalayu
- Leiorhagium adioincola Martin Haase, Susan Zielske, 2015
- Leiorhagium aremuum Martin Haase, Susan Zielske, 2015
- Leiorhagium clandestinum Martin Haase, Susan Zielske, 2015
- Leiorhagium neteae Martin Haase, Susan Zielske, 2015

== Terrestrial gastropods ==
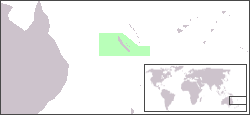
Location of New Caledonia

Family Achatinellidae

- Elasmias apertum
- Elasmias mariei
- Tornatellinops noumeemis

Family Achatinidae

- Allopeas gracile
- Allopeas micra Orbigny, 1835
- Subulina octona Bruguiere, 1792

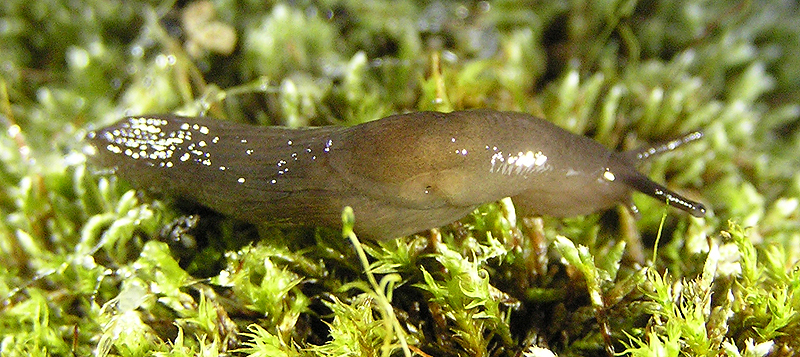
Deroceras laeve, of the family Agriolimacidae, on moss under dead tree trunk.

Family Agriolimacidae

- Deroceras laeve

Family Bothriembryontidae

- Leucocharis pancheri – endemic
- Placostylus eddystonensis Pfeiffer, 1855 – endemic
- Placostylus fibratus Martyn, 1789 – endemic
- Placostylus porphyrostomus Pfeiffer, 1851 – endemic

Family Camaenidae

- Bradybaena similaris

Family Cerastidae

- Rhachistia histrio

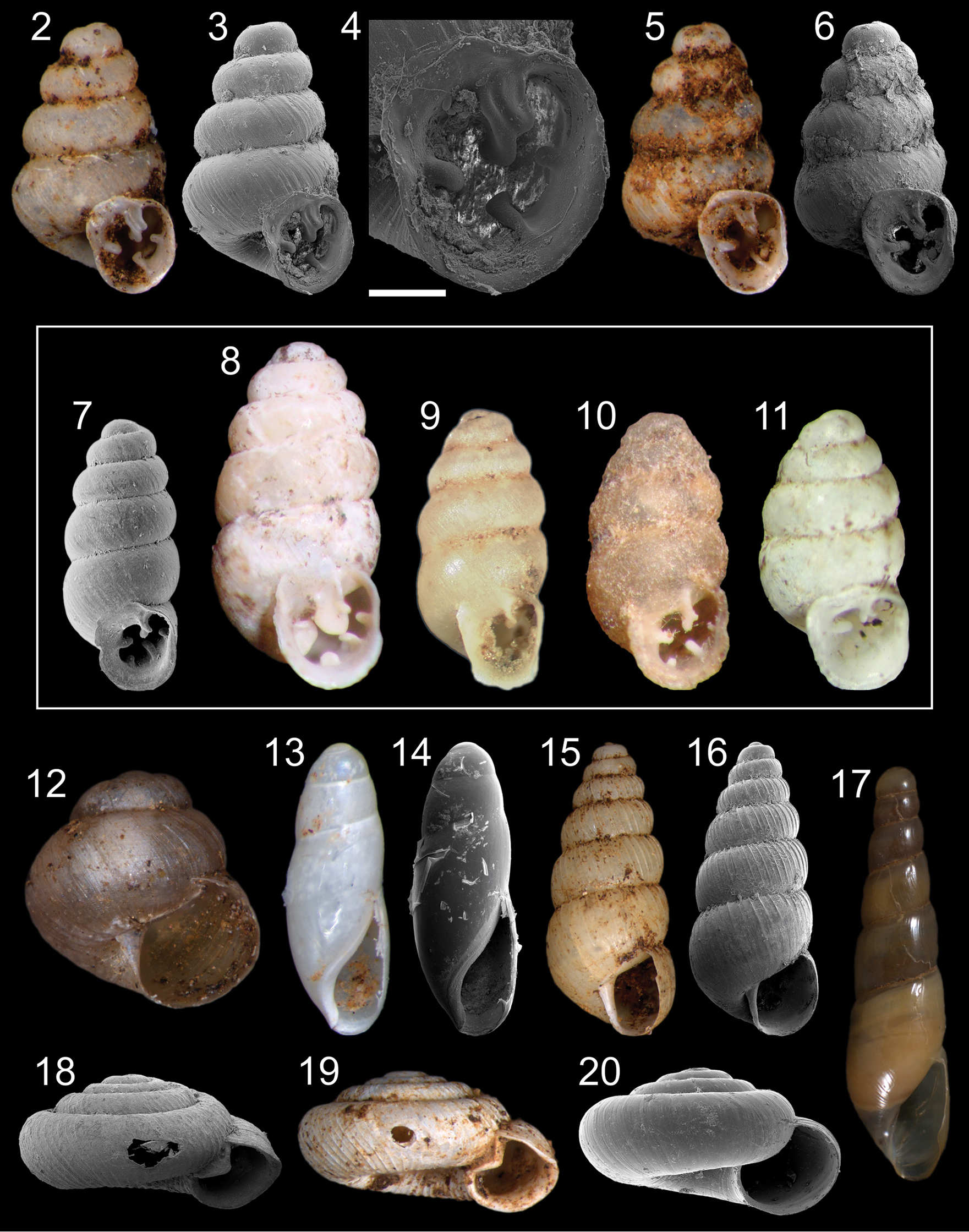
Shell number 10 is Gastrocopta servilis, of the family Gastrocoptidae.

Family Charopidae

- Andrefrancia vincentina Crosse, 1870

Family Draparnaudiidae

- Draparnaudia Montrouzier, 1859 – genus Draparnaudia is endemic to New Caledonia

Family Euconulidae

- Coneuplecta calculosa Gould, 1852

Family Ferussaciidae

- Geostilbia aperta

Family Gastrocoptidae

- Gastrocopta pediculus
- Gastrocopta servilis

Family Helicidae

- Cornu aspersum

Family Microcystidae

- Diastole conula
- Liardetia samoensis Mousson, 1865

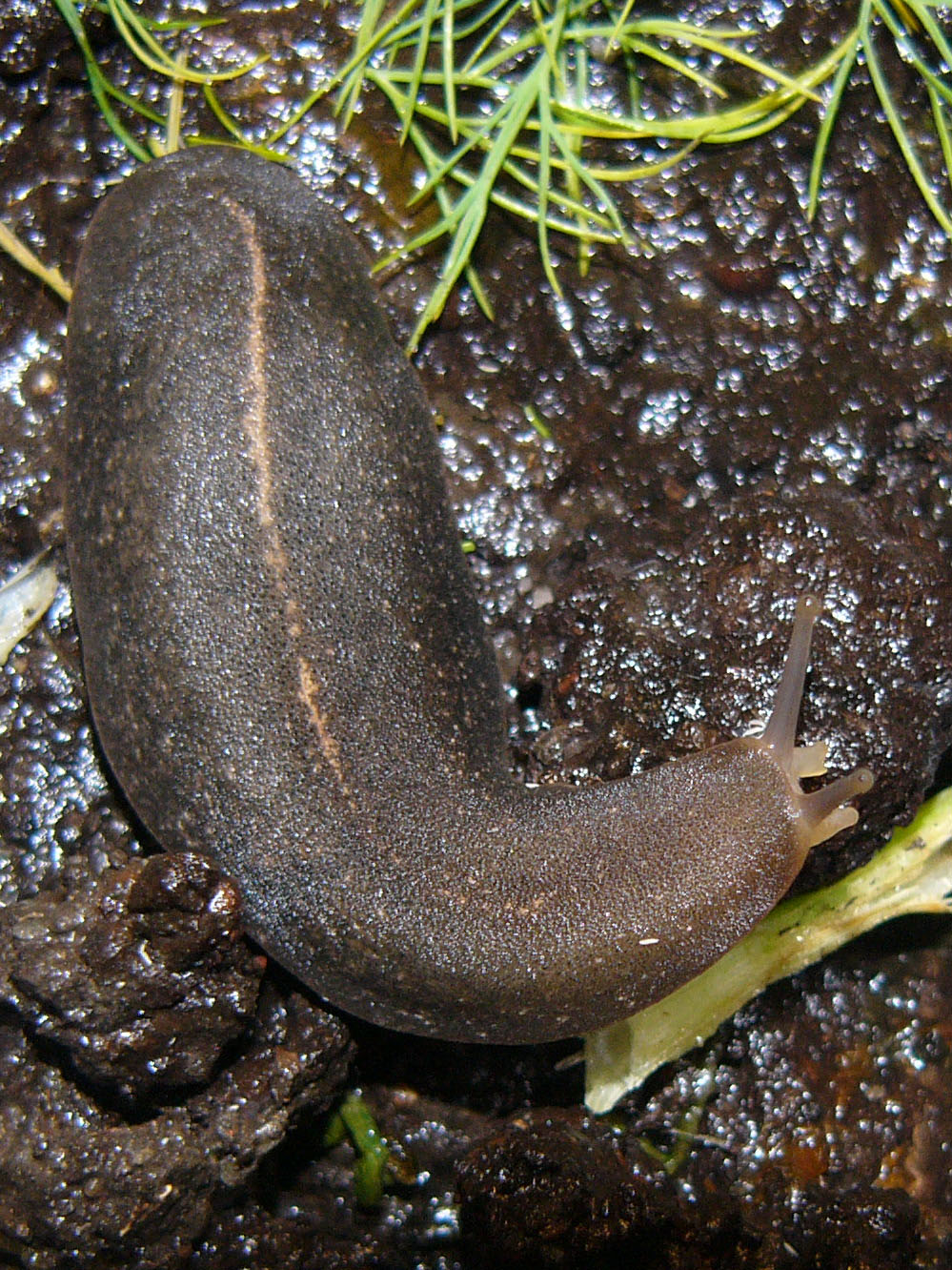
Specimen of Laevicaulis alte, of the family Veronicellidae.

Family Oleacinidae

- Varicella sp.

Family Pristilomatidae

- Hawaiia minuscula Binney, 1841

Family Rhytididae

- Rhytida inaequalis Pfeiffer, 1854

Family Sagdidae

- Lacteoluna sp.

Family Valloniidae

- Pupisoma dioscoricola

Family Veronicellidae

- Laevicaulis alte

== See also ==
- List of marine molluscs of New Caledonia
- List of non-marine molluscs of Australia
- List of non-marine molluscs of the Loyalty Islands
