= Hemistomia beaumonti =

Conservation status
- Data Deficient (IUCN 3.1)

Scientific classification
- Kingdom: Animalia
- Phylum: Mollusca
- Class: Gastropoda
- Subclass: Caenogastropoda
- Order: Littorinimorpha
- Family: Tateidae
- Genus: Hemistomia
- Species: H. beaumonti

Binomial name
- Hemistomia beaumonti Ponder, 1982

Species of gastropod

Hemistomia beaumonti is a species of small freshwater snails with an operculum, aquatic gastropod molluscs or micromolluscs in the family Tateidae. This species is endemic to Lord Howe Island, Australia.
