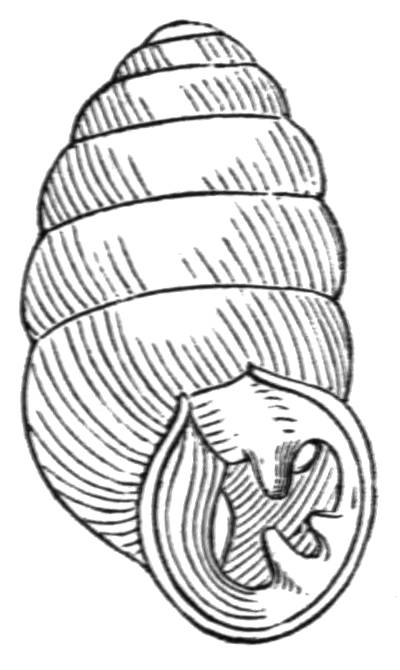
- Apertural view of a shell of Gastrocopta armifera

Scientific classification
- Domain: Eukaryota
- Kingdom: Animalia
- Phylum: Mollusca
- Class: Gastropoda
- Order: Stylommatophora
- Family: Gastrocoptidae
- Genus: Gastrocopta; Wollaston, 1878

Diversity
- Over 20 extant species Over 10 extinct species

Synonyms
- List: Australbinula Pilsbry, 1916; Australbinula (Papualbinula) Iredale, 1941; Bifidaria Sterki, 1891; Bifidaria (Immersidens) Pilsbry & Vanatta, 1900; Falsopupa Germain, 1918; Gastrocopta (Albinula) Sterki, 1892; †Gastrocopta (Ameralbinula) Pierce, 1992; Gastrocopta (Australbinula) Pilsbry, 1916; Gastrocopta (Falsopupa) Germain, 1918; Gastrocopta (Gastrocopta) Wollaston, 1878; Gastrocopta (Geminidens) Pilsbry, 1930; Gastrocopta (Immersidens) Pilsbry & Vanatta, 1900; Gastrocopta (Privatula) Sterki, 1893; Gastrocopta (Sinalbinula) Pilsbry, 1916; Gastrocopta (Staurotrema) Pilsbry, 1948; Gastrocopta (Vertigopsis) Sterki, 1892; Gyrodaria Iredale, 1940; Leucochilus O. Boettger, 1881; Pupa (Albinula) Sterki, 1892; Pupa (Bifidaria) Sterki, 1891; Pupa (Eubifidaria) Sterki, 1893; Pupa (Gastrocopta) Wollaston, 1878; Pupa (Leucochilus) O. Boettger, 1881; Pupa (Privatula) Sterki, 1893; Pupa (Vertigopsis) Sterki, 1892; Pupilla (Gastrocopta) Wollaston, 1878

= Gastrocopta =

Gastrocopta Temporal range: Oligocene–Recent

Genus of gastropods

Gastrocopta is a genus of minute air-breathing land snails, terrestrial pulmonate gastropod mollusks or micromollusks in the family Gastrocoptidae.

Gastrocopta is the type genus of the subfamily Gastrocoptinae. The height of the shell is about 2 mm.

== Distribution ==
The Recent distribution of Gastrocopta includes North America, eastern Asia, central Asia and South America (Brazil and Venezuela).

In Europe, the genus Gastrocopta has been extirpated; its fossils there are known mainly from the Neogene, but its fossil range in Europe is from the Oligocene to the Lower Pleistocene.

== Species ==
Species within the genus Gastrocopta include:

- † Gastrocopta abyssifluminis Roth, 1999
- † Gastrocopta acuminata (Klein, 1846)
- † Gastrocopta akokala Pierce in Pierce & Constenius, 2001
- Gastrocopta allyni Roth & Christensen, 1984
- Gastrocopta armifera (Say, 1821)
- Gastrocopta ashmuni (Chamberlin & Berry, 1930) - sluice snaggletooth
- Gastrocopta avanica (Benson, 1863)
- Gastrocopta bannertonensis (Gabriel, 1930)
- Gastrocopta barbadensis (Pfeiffer, 1853)
- Gastrocopta boninensis Pilsbry, 1916
- † Gastrocopta borysthaenica Prysjazhnjuk, 2015
- † Gastrocopta bugensis Prysjazhnjuk in Gozhik & Prysjazhnjuk, 1978
- † Gastrocopta chichijimana Pilsbry, 1916
- Gastrocopta cochisensis (Pilsbry & Ferriss, 1910)
- † Gastrocopta conica Pierce in Pierce & Rasmussen, 1992
- Gastrocopta contracta (Say, 1822)
- † Gastrocopta cordillerae Roth, 1986
- Gastrocopta corticaria (Say, 1816)
- Gastrocopta cristata Pilsbry & Vanatta
- Gastrocopta dalliana (Sterki, 1898)
- Gastrocopta damarica (Ancey, 1888)
- † Gastrocopta dehmi Schlickum & Strauch, 1979
- † Gastrocopta devjatkini Prysjazhnjuk in Prysjazhnjuk et al., 1975
- † Gastrocopta didymodus (Sandberger, 1858)
- Gastrocopta duplicata (Preston, 1911)
- † Gastrocopta edlaueri (Wenz, 1921)
- Gastrocopta ejecta (Bavay & Dautzenberg, 1912)
- Gastrocopta eudeli Pilsbry, 1916
- Gastrocopta ferdinandi (Andreae, 1902)
- † Gastrocopta fissidens (Sandberger, 1858)
- Gastrocopta geminidens (Pilsbry)
- Gastrocopta gularis F. G. Thompson & López, 1996
- Gastrocopta hedleyi Pilsbry, 1917
- Gastrocopta iheringi (Suter, 1900)
- † Gastrocopta itaboraiensis Salvador & Simone, 2013
- † Gastrocopta kazachica Steklov in Steklov & Tsytovich, 1967
- † Gastrocopta kedeica Prysiazhniuk, 2017 †
- † Gastrocopta kintlana Pierce in Pierce & Constenius, 2001 †
- Gastrocopta klunzingeri (Jickeli, 1873)
- † Gastrocopta krestnikovi Steklov, 1967
- † Gastrocopta lamellidens (F. Sandberger, 1858)
- Gastrocopta larapinta (Tate, 1896)
- † Gastrocopta lartetii (Dupuy, 1850)
- † Gastrocopta leonardi Pierce in Pierce & Rasmussen, 1992
- Gastrocopta macdonnelli (Brazier, 1875)
- Gastrocopta margaretae (Cox, 1868)
- † Gastrocopta mezzalirai (Ferreira & Coelho, 1971)
- Gastrocopta microscopica (E. von Martens, 1898)
- † Gastrocopta minuscula Pierce in Pierce & Rasmussen, 1992
- † Gastrocopta mongolica Prysjazhnjuk in Prysjazhnjuk et al., 1975
- † Gastrocopta montana Roth, 1986
- † Gastrocopta moravica (Petrbok, 1959)
- Gastrocopta mussoni Pilsbry, 1917
- † Gastrocopta nouletiana (Dupuy, 1850)
- † Gastrocopta obesa Pierce in Pierce & Rasmussen, 1992
- Gastrocopta oblonga (Pfeiffer, 1852)
- † Gastrocopta ogasawarana Pilsbry, 1916
- † Gastrocopta oviforma Pierce in Pierce & Rasmussen, 1992
- † Gastrocopta patagonica Miquel & P. E. Rodriguez, 2016
- Gastrocopta pediculus (Shuttleworth, 1852)
- Gastrocopta pellucida (Pfeiffer, 1840)
- Gastrocopta pentodon (Say, 1821)
- Gastrocopta pilsbryana (Pilsbry, 1948) - Montane snaggletooth
- † Gastrota polocopnica Harzhauser & Neubauer, 2018
- Gastrocopta procera (Gould)
- Gastrocopta prototypus (Pilsbry, 1899)
- † Gastrocopta pseudotheeli Steklov, 1966
- † Gastrocopta quadriplicata (A. Braun in Walchner, 1851)
- Gastrocopta recondita (Tapparone Canefri, 1883)
- † Gastrocopta rhenana Geissert, 1983
- Gastrocopta riograndensis (Pilsbry & Vanatta, 1900)
- Gastrocopta rixfordi Hanna, 1923
- Gastrocopta rupicola
- Gastrocopta rupicola marginalba (Pfeiffer, 1840)
- † Gastrocopta russelli Pierce in Pierce & Rasmussen, 1992
- † Gastrocopta sacraecoronae Krolopp, 1858
- Gastrocopta sagittaria Roth, 1986 †
- †Gastrocopta sandbergeri Stworzewicz & Prisyazhnyuk, 2006
- † Gastrocopta serotina (Ložek, 1964)
- Gastrocopta servilis (Gould, 1843)
- † Gastrocopta shandgolica Prysjazhnjuk in Prysjazhnjuk et al., 1975
- Gastrocopta sharae Salvador, Cavallari & Simone, 2017
- †Gastrocopta skiphica Prysjazhnjuk in Gozhik & Prysjazhnjuk, 1978
- Gastrocopta solitaria (Smith, 1890)
- † Gastrocopta steklovi Prisyazhnyuk, 1973
- Gastrocopta strangei (Pfeiffer, 1854)
- Gastrocopta stupefaciens Pokryszko, 1996
- † Gastrocopta suevica (O. Boettger, 1889)
- Gastrocopta tappaniana (C. B. Adams, 1841)
- † Gastrocopta tavennerensis Pierce in Pierce & Rasmussen, 1992
- Gastrocopta theeli (Westerlund, 1877)
- Gastrocopta thomasseti Pilsbry, 1929
- † Gastrocopta turgida (Reuss in Reuss & Meyer, 1849)
- † Gastrocopta tuvaense Steklov, 1967
- † Gastrocopta valentini Stworzewicz, 2007

subgenus Vertigopsis Sterki, 1892

- † Gastrocopta moravica (Petrbok, 1959)
- † Gastrocopta n. sp. from the Viernheim research borehole

Species brought into synonymy

- Gastrocopta soneri Chamberlin & Jones, 1929: synonym of Gastrocopta pilsbryana (Sterki, 1890)
