= Hemistomia flexicolumella =

Conservation status
- Vulnerable (IUCN 2.3)

Scientific classification
- Kingdom: Animalia
- Phylum: Mollusca
- Class: Gastropoda
- Subclass: Caenogastropoda
- Order: Littorinimorpha
- Family: Tateidae
- Genus: Hemistomia
- Species: H. flexicolumella

Binomial name
- Hemistomia flexicolumella Ponder, 1982

Species of gastropod

Hemistomia flexicolumella is a species of small freshwater snails with an operculum, aquatic gastropod molluscs or micromolluscs in the family Tateidae. This species is endemic to Australia.
