= Hemistomia xaracuu =

Conservation status
- Critically Endangered (IUCN 3.1)

Scientific classification
- Kingdom: Animalia
- Phylum: Mollusca
- Class: Gastropoda
- Subclass: Caenogastropoda
- Order: Littorinimorpha
- Family: Tateidae
- Genus: Hemistomia
- Species: H. xaracuu

Binomial name
- Hemistomia xaracuu Haase & Bouchet, 1998

Species of gastropod

Hemistomia xaracuu is a species of small freshwater snail with an operculum, an aquatic gastropod mollusc or micromollusc in the family Tateidae. This species is endemic to New Caledonia, where it is only known from a spring in a creek bed near Ouaméni in the Bouloupari basin.

== See also ==
- List of non-marine molluscs of New Caledonia
