= Hemistomia neku =

Conservation status
- Critically Endangered (IUCN 3.1)

Scientific classification
- Kingdom: Animalia
- Phylum: Mollusca
- Class: Gastropoda
- Subclass: Caenogastropoda
- Order: Littorinimorpha
- Family: Tateidae
- Genus: Hemistomia
- Species: H. neku

Binomial name
- Hemistomia neku Haase & Bouchet, 1998

Species of gastropod

Hemistomia neku is a species of small freshwater snail with an operculum, an aquatic gastropod mollusc or micromollusc in the family Tateidae. This species is only known from four specimens collected in Péyia, in the community of Oua Oué, Bourail, New Caledonia.

== See also ==
- List of non-marine molluscs of New Caledonia
