= Crosseana crosseana =

Conservation status
- Critically Endangered (IUCN 3.1)

Scientific classification
- Kingdom: Animalia
- Phylum: Mollusca
- Class: Gastropoda
- Subclass: Caenogastropoda
- Order: Littorinimorpha
- Family: Tateidae
- Genus: Crosseana
- Species: C. crosseana

Binomial name
- Crosseana crosseana (Gassies, 1874)

Synonyms
- Hemistomia crosseana (Gassies, 1874); Hydrobia crosseana Gassies, 1874

Species of gastropod

Crosseana crosseana is a species of small freshwater snail with an operculum, aquatic gastropod mollusc or micromollusc in the family Tateidae.

== Distribution ==
This species is endemic to New Caledonia, where it is currently only known from a seepage between Koumac village and Koumac River, in the north of the island.

== See also ==
- List of non-marine molluscs of New Caledonia
