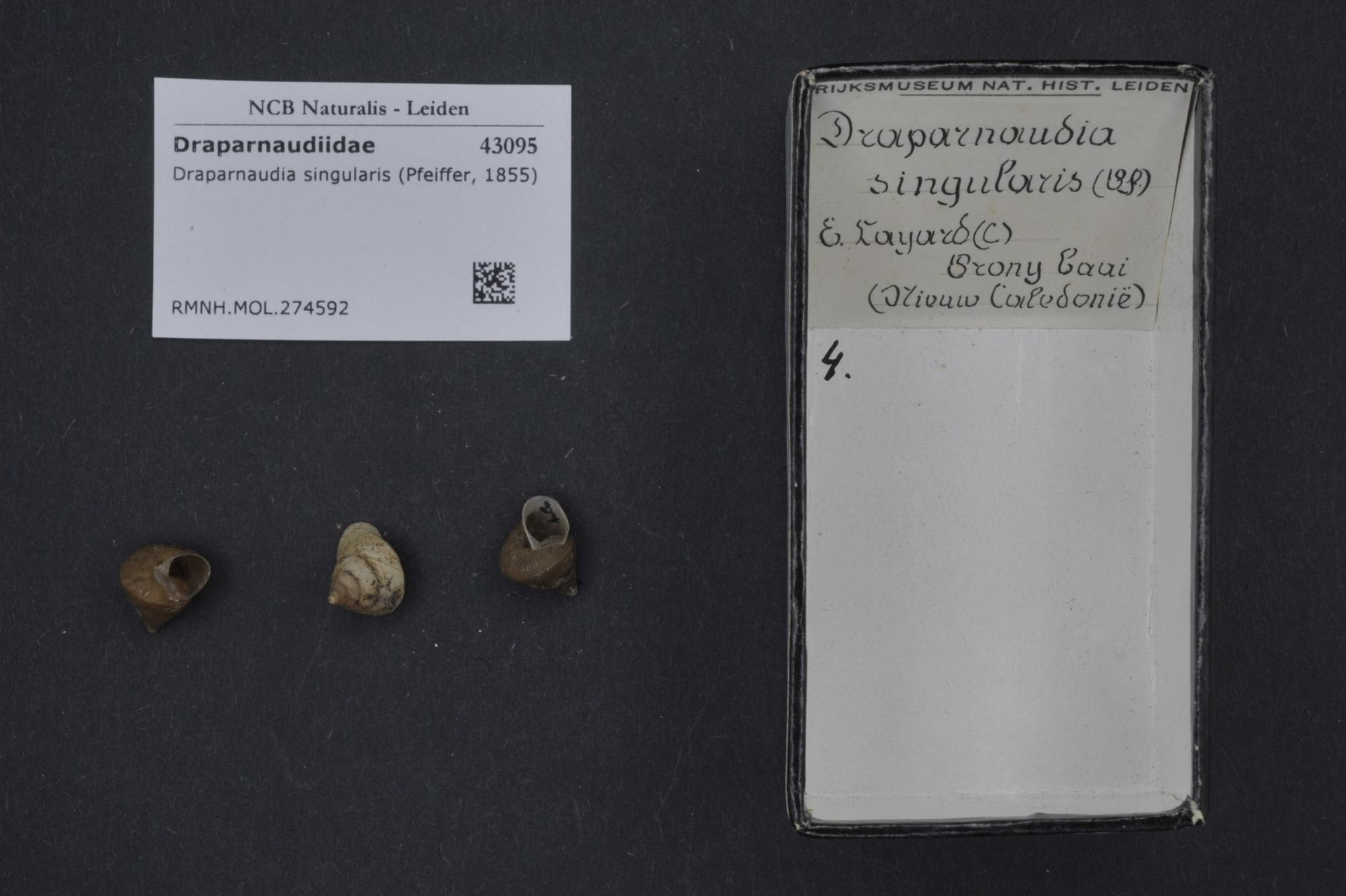
- empty shells of Draparnaudia singularis

Scientific classification
- Kingdom: Animalia
- Phylum: Mollusca
- Class: Gastropoda
- Order: Stylommatophora
- Infraorder: Pupilloidei
- Superfamily: Pupilloidea
- Family: Draparnaudiidae; Solem, 1962
- Genus: Draparnaudia; Montrouzier, 1859

Type species
- Draparnaudia michaudi Montrouzier, 1859

Species
- Draparnaudia anniae Tillier & Mordan, 1995; Draparnaudia gassiesi Pilsbry, 1902; Draparnaudia michaudi Montrouzier, 1859; Draparnaudia singularis Reeve, 1855; Draparnaudia singularis diminuta Ancey, 1905; Draparnaudia singularis singularis Reeve, 1855; Draparnaudia subnecata Tillier & Mordan, 1995; Draparnaudia walkeri Sykes, 1902

Diversity
- 6 species

= Draparnaudia =

Genus of gastropods

Draparnaudia is a genus of air-breathing land snails, terrestrial pulmonate gastropod mollusks in the superfamily Partuloidea.

Draparnaudia is the only genus in the family Draparnaudiidae.

The genus name was created to honor the 18th century French malacologist Jacques Philippe Raymond Draparnaud.

== Distribution ==
This genus is endemic to New Caledonia, in Melanesia and – probably introduced – to Vanuatu.

== Taxonomy ==
The family Draparnaudiidae is classified within the informal group Orthurethra, itself belonging to the clade Stylommatophora within the clade Eupulmonata (according to the taxonomy of the Gastropoda by Bouchet & Rocroi, 2005). Draparnaudia is the type genus of the family Draparnaudiidae.

Draparnaudiidae consists of one genus with six species:

- Draparnaudia anniae Tillier & Mordan, 1995
- Draparnaudia gassiesi Pilsbry, 1902
- Draparnaudia michaudi Montrouzier, 1859 – type species
- Draparnaudia singularis (Pfeiffer, 1855)
- Draparnaudia subnecata Tillier & Mordan, 1995
- Draparnaudia walkeri Sykes, 1903
