= Endre Krolopp =

Hungarian malacologist

Endre Krolopp (1935–2010) was a Hungarian malacologist, who published over 200 scientific papers and books, mainly on Quaternary molluscs.
