= Neku Atawodi-Edun =

Nigerian polo player

- Born: 1987 (age 38–39); Benue State, Nigeria
- Education: University of Brighton (BSc); Regent's University London (MA)
- Occupations: Polo player, Venture capitalist, Philanthropist
- Known for: First black female professional polo player; Founder of Ride to Shine
- Title: Director, MEST Africa (Former); Founder, Bamboo Green Concepts
- Awards: Forbes 30 Under 30 (2016); CNBC Young Business Leader Nominee (2016)

Neku Atawodi-Edun (born 1987), formerly Uneku Saliu-Atawodi, is a Nigerian polo player, equine sports scientist, entrepreneur, philanthropist, and investor. She is one of the few black female polo players in the world, and the first to play professionally.

== Education and early career ==
Raised between Nigeria and England, Uneku has played polo internationally for more than ten years. During her time playing in the United States, she was represented by Yvette Noel-Schure. She has played in games in over 22 cities in 14 countries, and won cups in Argentina, India, Ibiza and the USA where she won the Aiken 10 goal in her first year playing. She was a finalist in the WCTA High goal tournament, playing for Catalina diamonds. The WCTA is a tournament organised by late female polo player, Sunny Hale.

She served as the Face of Africa Polo Open for the year 2018. Africa Polo Open, formerly known as Prince of Wales Cup, is, arguably, Africa's grandest polo tournament. It takes place annually, and normally pits South Africa against another African country. South Africa's 2018 opponents were Nigeria.

Uneku received a Bachelor of Science (Hons) Degree in Equine Sports Science at the University of Brighton. She also has a master's degree in International Business from Regent's University London.

== Entrepreneurship ==
Uneku's entrepreneurship ventures include Malaik, an equity crowdfunding platform for African entrepreneurs, and Bamboo Green Concepts, an investment outfit with a diversified portfolio. Malaik closed its first $300,000 deal within two months of launching. In 2016, Forbes Africa Magazine listed Uneku as one of Forbes Africa's 30 under 30 for, the same year she graced the magazine's cover. Malaik however, suspended its operations after the Securities and Exchange Commission of Nigeria banned some forms of crowdfunding in 2016.

Uneku is also involved in the African tech space.

She also set up Ride to Shine, an organisation that exposes children from disadvantaged homes to opportunities through equestrianism.

== Public engagement ==
In 2008, Uneku organised the first ever female tournament to be held in West Africa, played at the 5th chukker polo club in Kaduna; it saw women from 8 different nations compete. She also organised the first ever beach polo cup, the Africa Beach Polo Cup, which was televised in partnership with SuperSport, thus creating awareness about the sport in Africa. In 2013, Uneku was the subject of Trace Sports Stars, a production of Trace Urban that followed her around the world playing polo in different countries to document and share her polo journey.

Besides polo, Uneku was a regular speaker and commentator on technology, startups, and entrepreneurship in Africa. She regularly spoke at Forbes Africa events, and contributed to Techcabal, an Africa-focused technology blog based out of Lagos, and Global Citizen, a development-focused platform.

She represented Nigeria at the World Economic Forum in Davos in 2013.

== Awards and honors ==
- World Economic Forum Global Shaper
- Forbes 30 under 30
- Nominee for the CNBC Young Business Leader of the Year, 2016
