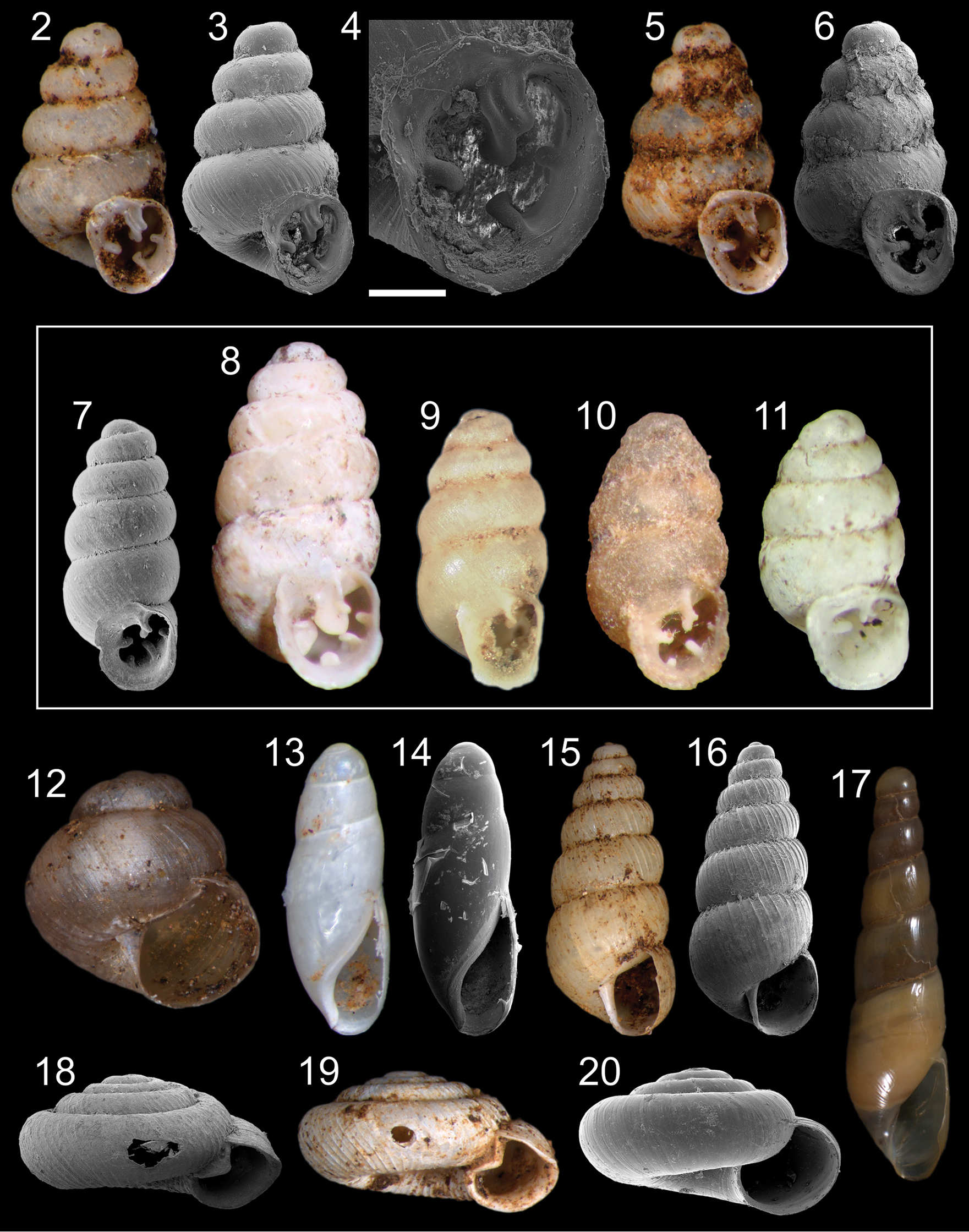

Conservation status
- Secure (NatureServe)

Scientific classification
- Kingdom: Animalia
- Phylum: Mollusca
- Class: Gastropoda
- Order: Stylommatophora
- Family: Gastrocoptidae
- Genus: Gastrocopta
- Species: G. servilis

Binomial name
- Gastrocopta servilis (Gould, 1843)

= Gastrocopta servilis =

Species of gastropod

Gastrocopta servilis is a species of gastropods belonging to the family Gastrocoptidae.

The species is found in Southern Hemisphere.
