= Viernheim =

- Town
- Coat of arms

- Location of Viernheim within Bergstraße district
- Interactive map of Viernheim
- Location within Germany Location within Hesse
- Coordinates: 49°32′30″N 8°34′43″E
- Country: Germany
- State: Hesse
- Admin. region: Darmstadt
- District: Bergstraße

Government
  - Mayor (2021–27): Matthias Baaß (SPD)

Area
  - Total: 48.41 km^{2} (18.69 sq mi)
- Elevation: 98 m (322 ft)

Population (2025-12-31)
  - Total: 34,285
  - Density: 708.2/km^{2} (1,834/sq mi)
- Time zone: UTC+01:00 (CET)
  - Summer (DST): UTC+02:00 (CEST)
- Postal codes: 68519
- Dialling codes: 06204
- Vehicle registration: HP
- Website: www.viernheim.de

Viernheim (German pronunciation: [ˈfɪʁnhaɪm]) is a midsize industrial town on Mannheim's outskirts and is found in the Rhine Neckar agglomeration and economic area. It is the second biggest town in Bergstraße district in Hesse, Germany. Since 1994 it has also borne the title Brundtlandstadt, as it has been taking part in an energy conservation pilot project. In 1968, the town hosted the eighth Hessentag state festival.

== Geography ==
=== Location ===
Viernheim lies in the Rhine rift, and although it also lies in Hesse, it is bounded on the west, south and east by Baden-Württemberg. North of the Viernheim woods, in Lampertheim, begins the Hessisches Ried. East of Viernheim lies the town of Weinheim, which is where the district’s namesake Bergstraße begins, and which also marks the beginning of the Odenwald. The town lies roughly 10 kilometres (6 miles) northeast of Mannheim, 10 km (6 mi) east of the Rhine and 10 km (6 mi) west of the Bergstrasse.

=== Neighbouring communities ===
Viernheim borders in the north on the town of Lampertheim (in Hessen), in the northeast on the towns of Hemsbach and Weinheim, in the south on the community of Heddesheim (all three in the Rhein-Neckar-Kreis), and in the west on the district-free city of Mannheim (all in Baden-Württemberg).

=== Constituent communities ===
Viernheim is divided into several sections. It has been the local, everyday speech and town expansions, though, that have yielded most of the divisions. They therefore have no precisely defined bounds. The Stadtkern, or town core, is made up of the Innenstadt ("Inner Town") and the Altstadt ("Old Town") lying around it. Among the other neighbourhoods are the Nordstadt ("North Town", north of Nibelungenstraße and Wormser Straße), the Nordweststadt ("Northwest Town", west of Kreuzstraße and Am Königsacker), the Tivoli (in the south at the Rhein-Neckar-Zentrum), Hinter den Zäunen (“Behind the Fences”, south of the OEG tracks), Gewerbegebiet Eins ("Commercial Area One", in the northeast, north of Friedrich-Ebert-Straße and east of Lorscher Straße) and the new development that has sprung up over the last few years, Bannholzgraben, east of Janusz-Korczak-Allee (L 3111). Moreover, there are also the Sportgebiet West (“Sport Area West”, west of the A 6), the two outlying centres which are each made up of only one road, Neuzenlache and Ziegelhütte (south of the A 659 and the outlying farms northeast of town.

== History ==
Viernheim grew out of a Carolingian king's court. Viernheim had its first documentary mention in 777 in the Lorsch codex, the Lorsch Abbey's book of documents. Through donations, it ended up in the Abbey’s ownership. In 1232, the Abbey’s holdings were given to the Archbishops of Mainz, but only in 1308 did Viernheim pass to Mainz. In 1439, however, the town was pledged to the Schönau Abbey, who in turn sold it to the Electorate of the Palatinate. After the Thirty Years' War, it passed back to Mainz, and thence under the Reichsdeputationshauptschluss in 1803 to the Grand Duchy of Hesse, out of which came the People's State of Hesse in 1918. Once in the People's State, the town was assigned first to the Amtsvogtei of Lorsch. When Landratsbezirke – another kind of administrative division – were created in 1821, Viernheim was assigned to Heppenheim. From 1832 to 1839 came a spell under Bensheim's jurisdiction. From 1848, the town then belonged to Heppenheim district, which in 1938 was merged with Bensheim district to form today’s Bergstraße district. In 1948, Viernheim was granted town rights by the newly founded Land of Hesse.

During the 19th century the tobacco industry gained some importance, since several small tobacco manufacturers were founded. Rolling cigars provided additional income for farmers or peasants and their families during the winter.

Until the end of the 19th century, Viernheim was a farming village. Bad harvests and widespread hunger in 1852 led to 458 inhabitants emigrating in this year to North America. With industrialization and the opening of the Oberrheinische Eisenbahn (a regional narrow-gauge railway still serving a roughly triangular route among Weinheim, Mannheim and Heidelberg) in 1887, the town began to become more of a workers’ residential community as many inhabitants found work in the factories in nearby Mannheim and Weinheim. Many workers, however, kept farming as a sideline. The location of industry in Viernheim itself began with the opening of the Weinheim-Worms railway (now mostly derelict) in 1905, and further strengthened after the Second World War, bringing along with it a sharp rise in population. Given the town's favourable road links to three Autobahnen, it grew into a midsize industrial town. In 1994 came its designation as a “Brundtland Town”, and its attendant participation in an energy conservation pilot project.

During World War II, Viernheim did not suffer severe damage, since the town had no strategic or industrial importance. So the Viernheim railway station served for a while as Mannheim station, after the Mannheim Central Station was destroyed in an air-raid in 1942.

On 23 June 2016, a hostage incident occurred within a cinema in the town. No hostages were injured and the gunman was shot and killed by the Spezialeinsatzkommando.

== Population development ==
Year	Inhabitants
1609	800
1655	< 200
1666	206
1703	500
1806	1,900
1818	1,818
1832	2,800
1845	3,135

Year	Inhabitants
1850	3,743
1860	3,350
1870	4,139
1880	5,254
1890	5,798
1900	6,816
1910	9,240
1920	10,250

Year	Inhabitants
1930	11,750
1940	12,778
1950	16,558
1960	20,068
1970	27,753
1980	29,590
1990	30,527
1995	31,616

Year	Inhabitants
1999	32,056
2000	32,427
2001	32,477
2002	32,488
2003	32,700
2004	32,737
2005	32,833
2006	32,593

Year	Inhabitants
2007	32,542
2008	32,502
2009	32,596
2010	32,713*
2013	33,120**

- 30 September 2010
  - 31 December 2013

=== Religion ===
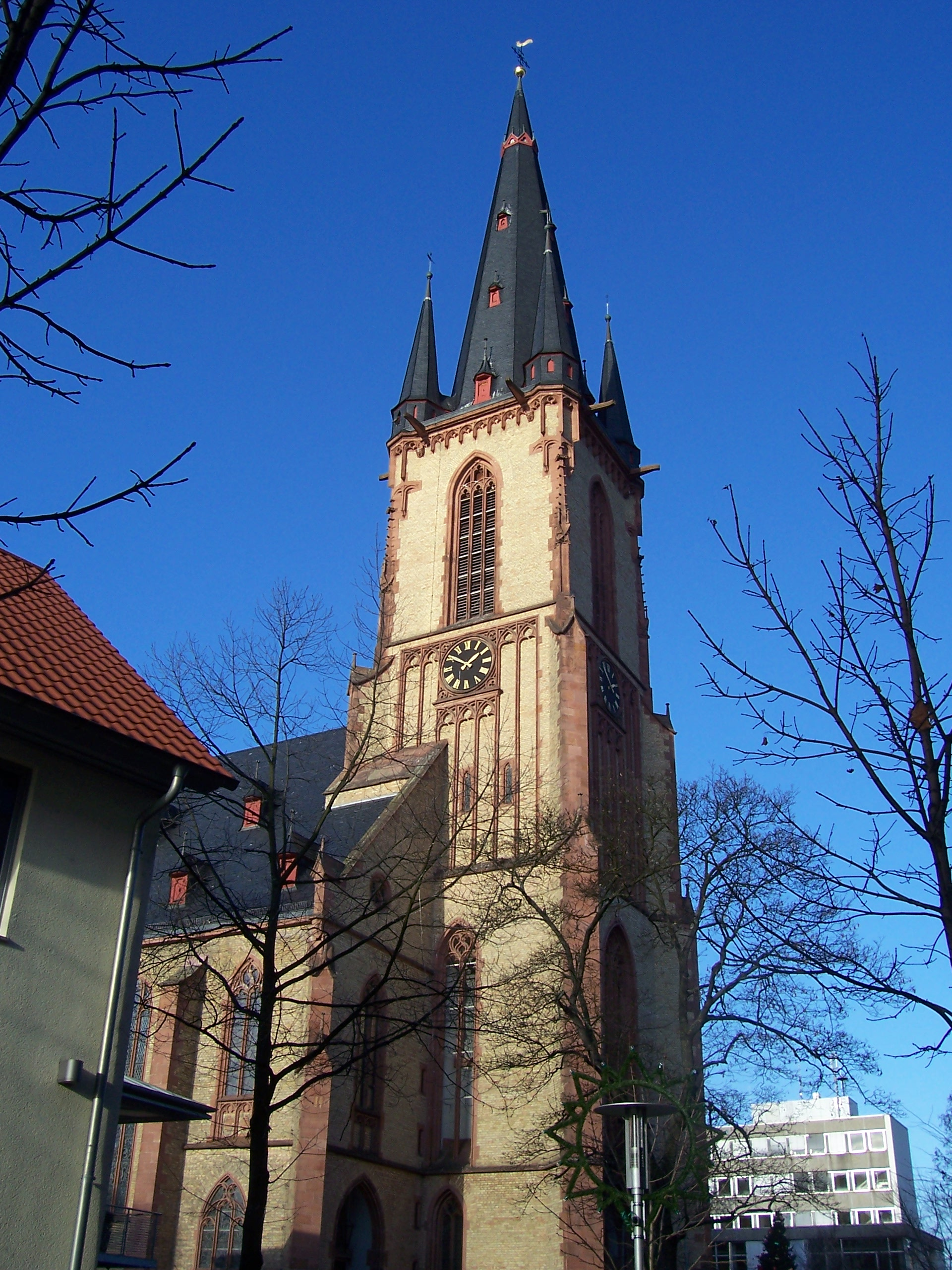
St. Aposteln

For a long time, Viernheim belonged to the Archbishopric of Mainz. Owing to changing lords in the 15th and 16th centuries, the townsfolk had to convert seven times because of the Peace of Augsburg. When the town passed back to the Electorate of Mainz, however, Roman Catholicism kept its place as the local denomination. In the early 20th century, the Lutheran townsfolk who had by now been drawn to the town got their own church in Viernheim.

=== Churches ===
Today in Viernheim, there are three Catholic parishes, St. Michael, St. Hildegard merged in 2015, St. Marien and St. Aposteln, which belong to the deanery of Bergstraße-West of the Bishopric of Mainz, and two Lutheran parishes, Auferstehungskirche ("Church of the Resurrection") and Christuskirche, which both belong to the deanery of Bergstraße-Süd of the Lutheran Church in Hesse and Nassau.

Besides the two big churches, the Bund Freier evangelischer Gemeinden in Deutschland ("League of Free Evangelical Parishes in Germany") has a parish, as do the Evangeliumschristen-Baptisten ("Gospel Christian Baptists"), the New Apostolic Church and the Jehovah's Witnesses. There has been no Jewish community in town since National Socialist times. The synagogue on Hügelstraße, consecrated on 31 August 1827, was destroyed by the SA along with some locals on 10 November 1938 during the Kristallnacht pogrom.

== Politics ==
=== Town council ===
The municipal election held on 27 March 2011 yielded the following results:

Parties and voter communities		% 2011	seats 2011	% 2006	seats 2006	% 2001	'seats 2001
SPD	Social Democratic Party of Germany	44.3	20	43.9	20	42.5	19
CDU	Christian Democratic Union of Germany	38.4	17	48.5	22	50.0	23
Greens	Bündnis 90/Die Grünen	12.9	6	5.4	2	5.6	2
The Left	Die Linke Viernheim	3.7	2	–	–	–	–
FDP	Free Democratic Party	0,7	0	–	–	–	–
VL	VIERNHEIM LIST	–	–	2.1	1	1.9	1
Total		100	45	100	45	100	45
Turnout in Percent		41.6		40.3		44.9	

=== Mayors ===
Heading the town is the Mayor (Bürgermeister) who is directly elected by the people for a term of six years. Mayor Matthias Baaß (SPD) has been in office since 1997 and was re-elected on 7 June 2009 to his third term with 72.1% of the vote. The next mayoral election is planned for 2015.

At his side is the First Town Councillor (Erster Stadtrat), along with 11 part-time councillors. They are all chosen by the town assembly (Stadtverordnetenversammlung) for terms of six and five years respectively and reflect the assembly's political makeup at the time of their appointments.

The Mayor, the First Town Councillor and the 11 part-time councillors together form the town's executive (Magistrat).

Following is a list of the town's mayors since 1822 (from 1649 to 1822, eight Schultheißen – roughly "sheriffs" – are known to history):

- 1822–1824: Joh. Jakob Georgi
- 1825–1842: Johann Beikert
- 1842–1847: Georg Kühner
- 1848–1853: Peter Minnig
- 1853–1862: Johann Kempf
- 1862–1873: Michael Keller
- 1873–1875: Johann Winkler 5.
- 1875–1895: Johann Bläß 1.
- 1895–1904: Georg Pfützer 2.
- 1904–1913: Gg. Friedrich Kühlwein
- 1913–1933: Jean Lamberth (Centre Party)
- 1933–1945: Hanns Bechtel (NSDAP)
- 1945: Martin Alter
- 1945–1946: Nikolaus Schlosser
- 1946–1960: Lorenz Neff (SPD)
- 1960–1975: Hans Mandel (SPD)
- 1975–1981: Erwin Bugert (SPD)
- 1981–1987: Josef Baumgärtner (CDU)
- 1987–1997: Norbert Hofmann (SPD)
- since 1997: Matthias Baaß (SPD)

=== Coat of arms ===
The town's arms might be described thus: Party per fess, above azure the Lion of Hesse armed and crowned Or and langued gules, below party per pale gules a six-spoked wheel argent and Or a Gothic four sable.

The arms were introduced in 1926. The charge in the upper part of the escutcheon is the Lion of Hesse, which expresses the town's longstanding status as part of Hesse. Below the fess line on the dexter (armsbearer's right, viewer's left) side is the Wheel of Mainz, which stands for the town's former allegiance to the Electorate of Mainz. On the sinister (armsbearer's left, viewer's right) side is a Gothic figure of four, which used to be the local logo, making the arms canting, that is to say, suggestive of the town's name, since the German word for “four” is vier. Although it sounds rather like the first syllable in the town's name, it seems likelier that this comes from the Old High German firni (“old”, “from long ago”) or the Celtic vernos (“alder”).

The Viernheim town flag is blue-white-red.

== Twin towns – sister cities ==
Viernheim is twinned with:

- Franconville, France (1966)
- Potters Bar, United Kingdom (1972)
- Rovigo, Italy (1991)
- Silly, Burkina Faso (1994)
- Mława, Poland (2019)

== Economy and infrastructure ==
=== Transport ===
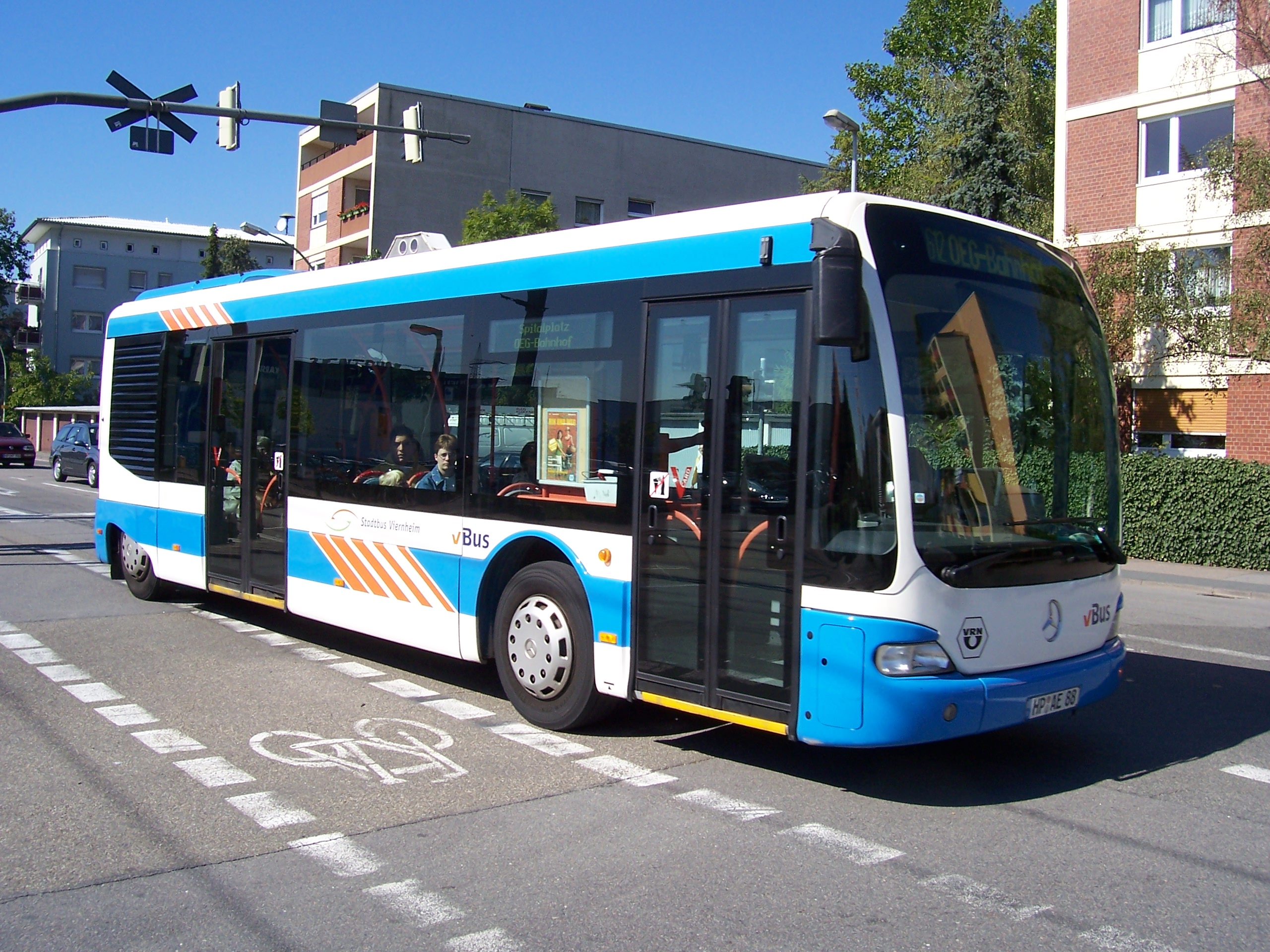
Viernheimer Stadtbus

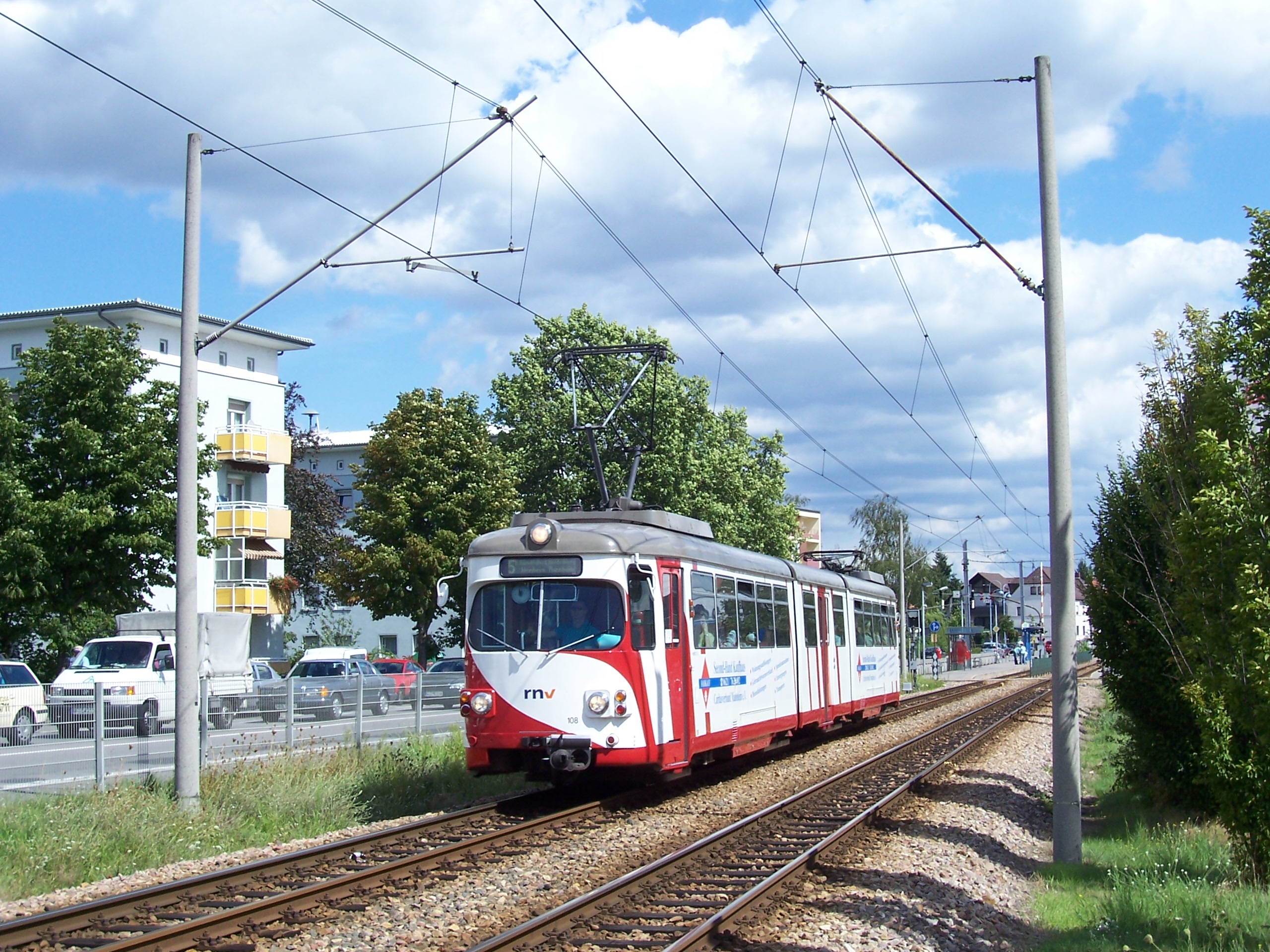
OEG cars at the Rhein-Neckar-Zentrum

==== Road transport ====
Viernheim lies on the A 659, which leads directly to Mannheim and Weinheim, and also affords a direct link to three further Autobahnen, the A 5, the A 6 and the A 67. Because of the two Autobahn junctions, the Viernheimer Kreuz and the Viernheimer Dreieck, Viernheim is also well known to many drivers.

==== Local public transport ====
Viernheim is linked to the surrounding cities by a narrow-gauge railway and a busline. The electric narrow-gauge railway (Oberrheinische Eisenbahn, OEG), nowadays designated line 5R, is usually regarded as an interurban. Since 1887 it has run to Mannheim, Weinheim and Heidelberg, and is run by the Rhein-Neckar-Verkehr GmbH (RNV). A regional busline of Busverkehr Rhein-Neckar runs to Weinheim as well as Lampertheim and Worms. There are also two town buslines run by the RNV daughter company V-Bus. All public transport is integrated into the Rhine-Neckar Transport Association.

==== Rail transport ====
Viernheim is the endpoint of the Weinheim–Viernheim railway line built in 1905, which originally ran on by way of Lampertheim to Worms to afford a link with the Weschnitztalbahn there. Owing to low demand, however, passenger service was discontinued in 1960 on the whole line and replaced with a bus service, while the tracks between Viernheim and Lampertheim were torn up (the right-of-way can still be discerned in the woods today as a broad lane). Only goods service was continued between Weinheim and Viernheim by Deutsche Bahn, until it, too, ceased. It was, however, revived in July 2004 by the MVV GmbH daughter company ConTrain. The old railway station today houses a municipal leisure and meeting place bearing the name Treff im Bahnhof (“Meeting in the Railway Station”).

=== Established businesses ===
Viernheim has four industrial area with many middle-class businesses.

Many well known firms, such as Pfenning Logistics, have their warehouses in Viernheim and Buderus has its distribution centre there. Plisch GmbH and Hommel Hercules Werkzeuge also have their head offices in the town. The Rhein-Neckar-Zentrum shopping centre, opened in 1972, is nationally famous and probably the most well known.

=== Media ===
In Viernheim there are two regional daily newspapers:

- Viernheimer Tageblatt, founded in 1883,
- Mannheimer Morgen as Südhessen Morgen with a Viernheim regional edition

The following free advertising fliers are distributed weekly:

- Viernheimer Volksblatt
- Wochenblatt Mannheim
- Bergsträßer Anzeigen-Zeitung (BAZ)

The following regional media see Viernheim as part of their feeder and distribution area:

- Hessischer Rundfunk, Südwestrundfunk (Kurpfalz-Radio within the framework of SWR4 Baden-Württemberg)
- Rhein-Neckar Fernsehen (television)
- Radio Regenbogen, Hit Radio FFH, Radio RPR, sunshine live, bigFM, bermuda.funk
- Bild Rhein-Neckar
- Meier (magazine)

=== Education ===
- Primary schools:
  - Schillerschule
  - Goetheschule
  - Nibelungenschule
  - Friedrich-Fröbel-Schule
- Primary school/Hauptschule/Realschule:
  - Friedrich-Fröbel-Schule
- comprehensive school Hauptschule/Realschule/Gymnasium:
  - Alexander-von-Humboldt-Schule
- Gymnasium:
  - Albertus-Magnus-Schule – Gymnasium sponsored by the Bishopric of Mainz
- Special school:
  - Albert-Schweizer-Schule

Further schools with specific profiles are to be found in the neighbouring cities.

The nearest colleges and universities are found in nearby Mannheim and Heidelberg.

== Culture and sightseeing ==
=== Museums and galleries ===
- Europäisches Fotozentrum für junge Fotografie
- Heimatmuseum (local history)
- Humboldt-Galerie
- Kunsthaus Viernheim (art)
- Kunstverein Viernheim (art club)

=== Churches ===
- Evangelische Auferstehungskirche, Berliner Ring (Church of the Resurrection)
- Evangelische Christuskirche, Saarlandstaße
- Kapelle St. Josef, Bürgermeister Neff-Straße 15 (Tridentine Mass)
- Neuapostolische Kirche, Maria-Mandel-Straße* St. Apostel Kirche
- St. Hildegard
- St. Marien Kirche
- St. Michael

=== Parks ===
- Tivoli Park
- Viernheimer Vogelpark

=== Bodies of water ===
- Bannholzgraben
- Schwarzer brook
- Waldsee (popularly "Anglersee"), a large artificial pond and recreation area.

=== Buildings ===
- Marienkirche
- Various other churches of Germany's two predominant denominations:
  - Evangelical
    - Auferstehungskirche
    - Christuskirche
    - Freie Evangelische Gemeinde
  - Catholic
    - Kapelle St. Josef
    - Kirche St. Aposteln
    - Kirche St. Hildegard
    - Kirche St. Marien
    - Kirche St. Michael
- Warriors' Memorial on Weinheimer Straße

=== Sport ===
- Badminton Club Viernheim
- Balettschule Heide Heidt (ballet school)
- ERC Viernheim (artistic roller skating)
- Golf Club Mannheim-Viernheim
- Ski Club Viernheim
- TSV Amicitia Viernheim
- Turnverein von 1893 Viernheim (TV 1893, gymnastic club)
- 1.Viernheimer Karate Dojo
- Viernheimer Billiard Club 1967
- Viernheimer SV (swimming club)

=== Regular events ===
- February: Carnival parade or Street Carnival (alternating each year)
- May: 1 May Labour Day: German Confederation of Trade Unions celebration
- May: Tanz in den Mai; Traditionelles May Day at the fire station, Brundtlandfest
- July: first weekend, traditional community festival of community association, Viernheim
- July: CdG-Sommerfest in Bavarian style* August: MGV- Gartenfest (first weekend in August)
- August: MGV- Gartenfest (first weekend in August)
- August: Viernheimer Triathlon (1,5 / 46 / 10)
- September: Innenstadtfest (downtown festival)
- September: Südhessische Akkordeontage
- November: Kerwe (church consecration festival)
- December: Christmas Market
- 24-hour walk, St. Michael's parish
- Parish festivals
- Seifenkistenrennen (soapbox race) of the Viernheim scouts

== Notable people ==
- Jakob Keller (1873–1961), judge, politician, Member of Landtag (centre)
- Joachim Jung (born 1954), actor and screenwriter
- Ulrich Tukur (born 1957), actor and musician
- Claudia Tonn (born 1981), heptathlete
- Kaya Kinkel (born 1987), politician

=== Honorary citizens ===
- 1948: Prof. Dr. Ludwig Bergsträsser, chairman of the first postwar Hessian government (1883–1960)
- 1948: Hans Mayr, rector (1864–1958), editor of the "Chronik der Stadt Viernheim"
- 1949: Dr. Karl Alter, Archbishop of Cincinnati (1885–1977)
- 1965: Dr. Nikolaus Hattemer, deacon (1900–1970)
- 1973: Anton Darmstadt, clergyman (1900–1981)
- 1975: Hans Mandel, mayor (1917–2010)
- 1975: Michael Bugert, honorary town councillor (1905–1989)

== Clubs ==
- Spvgg. Amicitia 09 – football
- Club der Gemütlichen – Carnival club
- Große Drei – Carnival club
- Turnverein von 1893 e. V. Viernheim – gymnastics
- KJG – St. Michael, St. Aposteln, St. Marien, St. Hildegard
- TSV Viernheim – sport club
- Herolde – music
- TC Viernheim – tennis
- Kunstverein Viernheim – art
- Kerweverein Viernheim – church consecration festival club
- Evangelischer Posaunenchor Viernheim – choir
- ASV Viernheim 1968 e. V. – Angelsport-Verein – angling
- SRC -Stemm- und Ringclub Viernheim e. V.
- Stadtnetz und Internet Freunde Viernheim e. V.
- Frauenchor 1947 Viernheim e. V. – women's choir
- Männergesangverein 1846 Viernheim e. V. – men's choir
- Sportschützenverein Viernheim 1953 e. V. – shooting
- Siedlergemeinschaft Viernheim e. V. – community association
