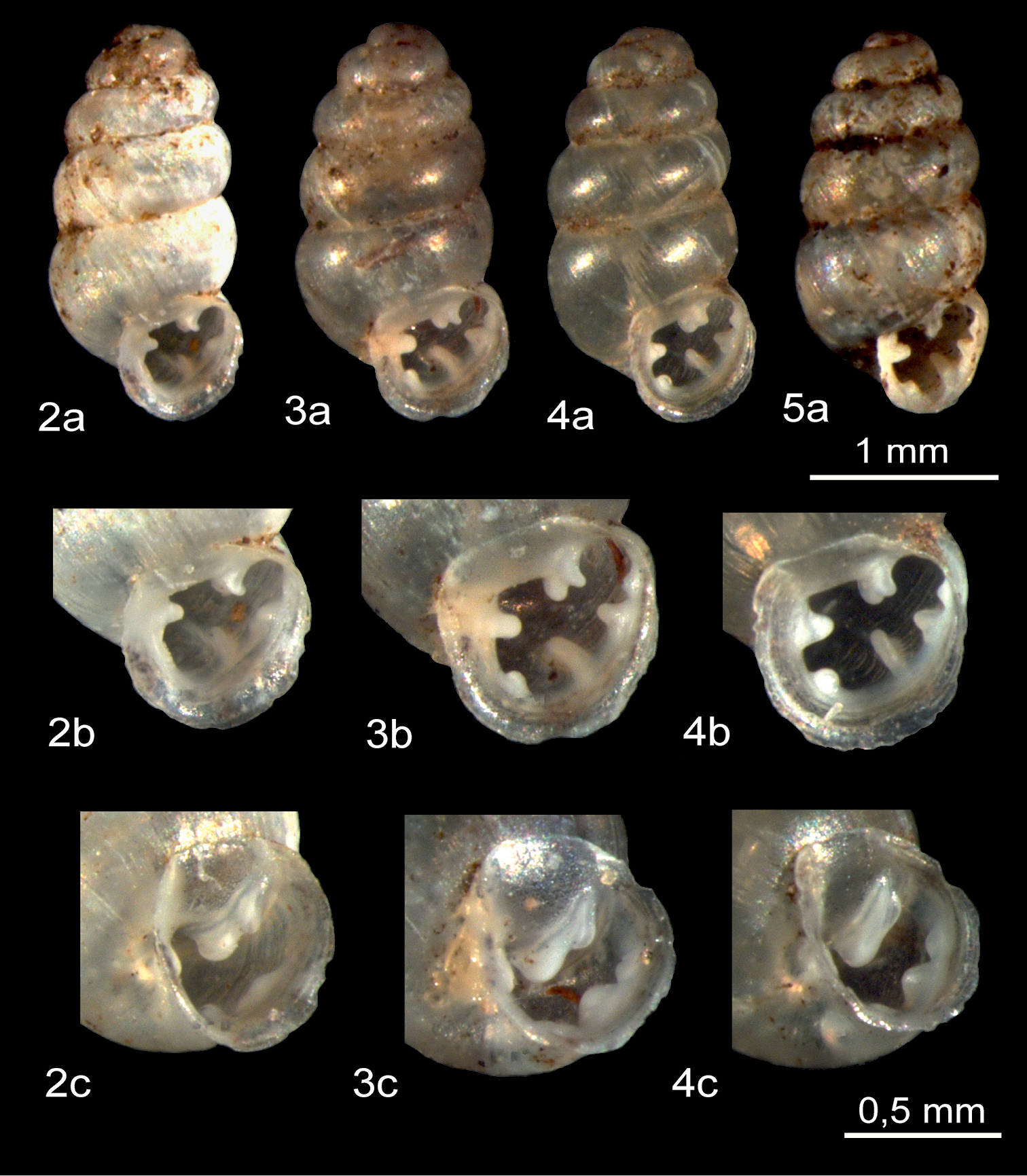
- Shells of Gastrocopta huttoniana and Gastrocopta theeli

Scientific classification
- Kingdom: Animalia
- Phylum: Mollusca
- Class: Gastropoda
- Order: Stylommatophora
- Superfamily: Pupilloidea
- Family: Gastrocoptidae; Pilsbry, 1918

Subfamilies
- Gastrocoptinae; Hypselostomatinae

= Gastrocoptidae =

Gastrocoptidae Temporal range: Paleocene-recent

Family of gastropods

Gastrocoptidae is a family of small, air-breathing land snails, terrestrial pulmonate gastropod molluscs in the superfamily Pupilloidea.

== Distribution ==
The distribution of the Gastrocoptidae is nearly worldwide, although family is extinct in Europe since Pleistocene, except one species in Northern Caucasus. In fossil record from Paleocene.

== Taxonomy ==
For some time was considered as a subfamily in Vertiginidae, some species of these two families are very similar by the shell's characters.

Genera in the family Gastrocoptidae include:

- † Albinulopsis Kadolsky, 2020
- † Balticopta Balashov & Perkovsky, 2020 - fossil from Eocene Baltic amber
- † Ptychalaea Boettger, 1889 fossil from Miocene and Eocene of Europe

Subfamily Gastrocoptinae Pilsbry, 1918

- Cavipupa Pilsbry, 1934 - endemic to Philippines
- Chaenaxis Pilsbry & Ferris, 1906 - North America
- Gastrocopta Wollaston, 1878 - the type genus of the family, distributed nearly worldwide, over 100 species, in fossil record from Paleocene, very numerous and speciose in the Miocene deposits of Europe
- Gibbulina Beck, 1837
- Pumilicopta Solem, 1988 - Australia
- Ulpia Hylton Scott, 1955

== Synonyms ==
- Bifidaria Sterki, 1891: synonym of Gastrocopta Wollaston, 1878 (junior subjective synonym)
- Falsopupa Germain, 1918: synonym of Gastrocopta Wollaston, 1878 (junior synonym)
- Leucochilus O. Boettger, 1881: synonym of Gastrocopta (Albinula) Sterki, 1892 represented as Gastrocopta Wollaston, 1878 (Invalid: Leucochilus was originally an unjustified emendation of Leucochila Martens, 1860, but had been used as a separate name until it was placed on the Official Index by Opinion 115, 1931; junior synonym)
- Aulacospirinae Zilch, 1959 : synonym of Hypselostomatinae Zilch, 1959 accepted as Hypselostomatidae Zilch, 1959 (junior subjective synonym)
- Australbinula Pilsbry, 1916 : synonym of Gastrocopta Wollaston, 1878 (junior synonym)
- Gyrodaria Iredale, 1940: synonym of Gastrocopta Wollaston, 1878
- Hypselostomatinae Zilch, 1959: synonym of Hypselostomatidae Zilch, 1959 (superseded rank)

== Literature ==
- Pilsbry H.A. 1916–1918. Manual of Conchology. Second Series: Pulmonata, 24. Pupillidae (Gastrocoptinae). Philadelphia: Academy of Natural Sciences of Philadelphia. 380 p.
- Pilsbry H.A., Cooke C.M. 1918–1920. Manual of Conchology. Second Series: Pulmonata, 25. Pupillidae (Gastrocoptinae, Vertigininae). Academy of Natural Sciences of Philadelphia. Philadelphia. 401 pp.
- Schileyko A.A. 1998. Treatise on Recent Terrestrial Pulmonate Molluscs. Part 2: Gastrocoptidae, Hypselostomatidae, Vertiginidae, Truncatellinidae, Pachnodidae, Enidae, Sagdidae // Ruthenica. Suppl.2. P.129–261.
- Páll-Gergely B., 2023. Anauchen (?) kozari n. sp., a new Hypselostomatid species from Laos (Gastropoda: Stylommatophora: Pupilloidea). Acta Phytopathologica et Entomologica Hungarica: 1-9

== Links ==
- Gojšina, V., Hunyadi, A., Sutcharit, C., Tongkerd, P., Auffenberg, K., Grego, J., Vermeulen, J. J., Reischütz, A. & Páll-Gergely, B. (2025). "A new start? Revision of the genera Anauchen, Bensonella, Gyliotrachela and Hypselostoma (Gastropoda, Eupulmonata, Hypselostomatidae) of Southeast Asia with description of 46 new species". ZooKeys (1235): 1–338. Bibcode:2025ZooK.1235....1G. doi:10.3897/zookeys.1235.145281. PMC 12044344. PMID 40321358.
- MolluscaBase - Gastrocoptidae
