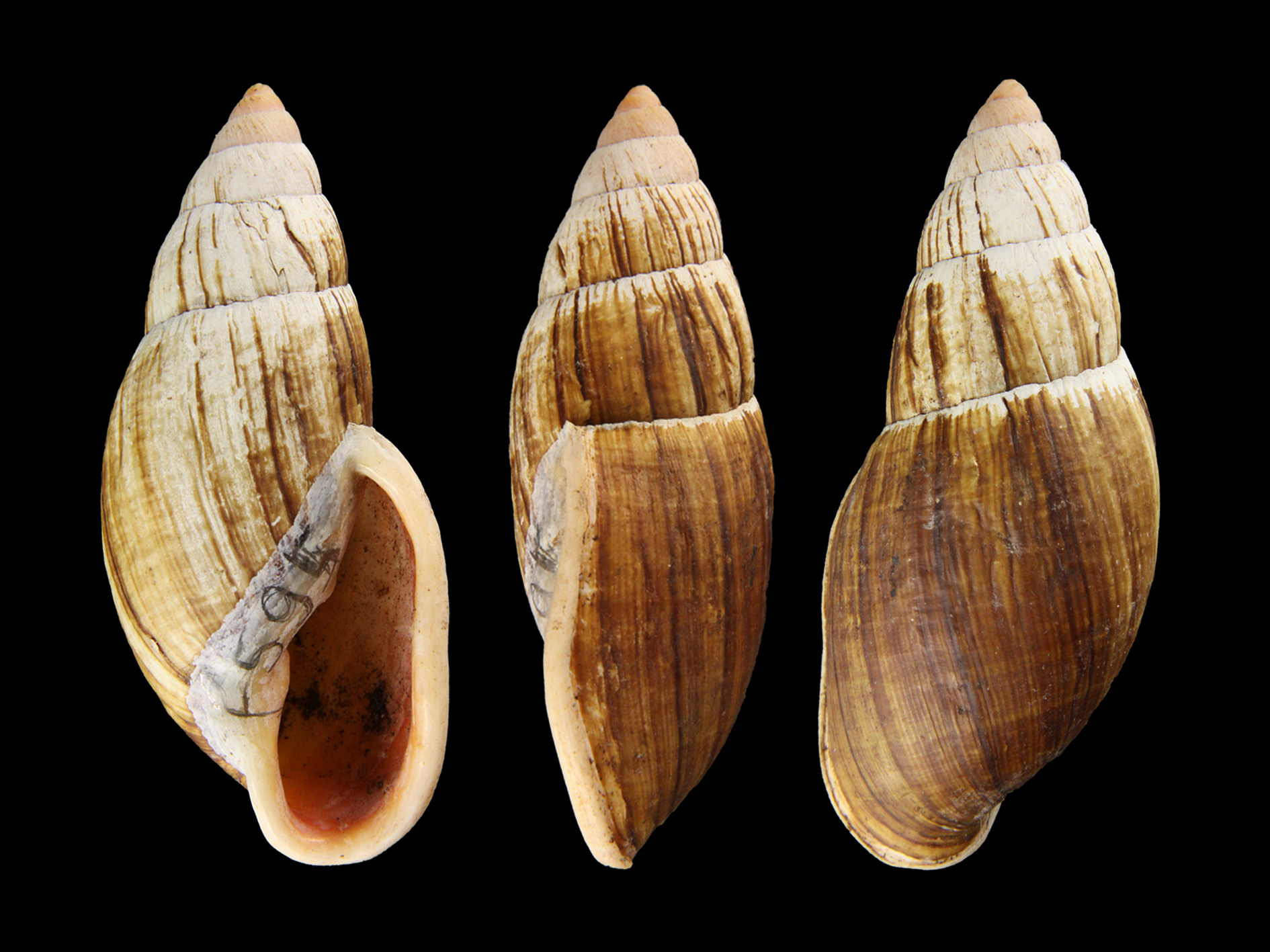
- Placostylus fibratus

Scientific classification
- Kingdom: Animalia
- Phylum: Mollusca
- Class: Gastropoda
- Order: Stylommatophora
- Family: Bothriembryontidae
- Subfamily: Placostylinae
- Genus: Placostylus; Beck, 1837

Type species
- Limax fibratus Martyn, 1784

Synonyms
- Bulimus (Placostylus) H. Beck, 1837 (original rank); Maoristylus F. Haas, 1935; Placostylus (Maoristylus) Haas, 1935

= Placostylus =

Genus of gastropods

Placostylus, or flax snails, are a genus of very large, air-breathing land snails, terrestrial pulmonate gastropod molluscs in the family Bothriembryontidae.

The shells of the snails in this genus can be as large as 4.5 inches (11 cm) in maximum dimension.

Many species within this genus are now extinct.

== Taxonomy ==
Placostylus is the type genus of the family Placostylidae. It was placed within Placostylidae.

Breure et al. (2010) moved Prestonella and Bothriembryon to Placostylidae. Subsequently, Breure & Romero (2012) confirmed previous results from 2010 and they renamed Placostylidae to Bothriembryontidae.

== Distribution ==
This genus of snails occurs in the Solomon Islands, Vanuatu, New Caledonia, Fiji, Lord Howe Island, and Northland in New Zealand. There are three species in New Zealand and no subspecies.

== Species ==
In former classification, two subgenera were recognized: subgenus Basileostylus Haas, 1935 subgenus Maoristylus Haas, 1935

Species within this genus include:

- † Placostylus abbreviatus (Gassies, 1871)
- Placostylus bondeensis (Crosse & Souverbie, 1869)
- Placostylus caledonicus (Petit, 1845)
- Placostylus eddystonensis Pfeiffer, 1855
- Placostylus fibratus (Martyn, 1789) - type species
- † Placostylus leoni Haas, 1935
- Placostylus porphyrostomus Pfeiffer, 1851
- Placostylus scarabus (Albers, 1854)
- † Placostylus senilis (Gassies, 1869)

Synonyms

- Placostylus albersi Dautzenberg & Bouge in Dautzenberg, 1923: synonym of Placostylus fibratus souvillei (Morelet, 1857) (nom. nov. pro Placostylus eximius Albers not Reeve)
- Placostylus alexander (Crosse, 1855): synonym of Placostylus fibratus alexander (Crosse, 1855)
- Placostylus alienus Pilsbry, 1893: synonym of Santacharis fuligineus (L. Pfeiffer, 1854) (original combination; junior synonym)
- Placostylus ambagiosus Suter, 1907: synonym of Maoristylus ambagiosus (Suter, 1907) (superseded combination)
- Placostylus annibal (Souverbie, 1869): synonym of Placostylus caledonicus (Petit, 1845) (junior synonym)
- Placostylus bavayi (Crosse & Marie, 1868): synonym of Placostylus eddystonensis bavayi (Crosse & Marie, 1868)
- Placostylus bivaricosus (Gaskoin, 1855): synonym of Maoristylus bivaricosus (Gaskoin, 1855)
- Placostylus bollonsi Suter, 1908 - New Zealand flax snail: synonym of Basileostylus bollonsi (Suter, 1908)
- Placostylus calus E. A. Smith, 1892: synonym of Eumecostylus calus (E. A. Smith, 1892) (original combination)
- Placostylus cicatricosus (Gassies, 1871): synonym of Placostylus fibratus alexander (Crosse, 1855) (junior synonym)
- Placostylus cleryi (Petit de la Saussage, 1850): synonym of Eumecostylus cleryi (Petit de la Saussaye, 1850)
- Placostylus cuniculinsulae Cox, 1872: synonym of Maoristylus bivaricosus (Gaskoin, 1855) (junior synonym)
- Placostylus dorseyi Dall, 1910: synonym of Partula grisea Lesson, 1831
- Placostylus duplex (Gassies, 1871): synonym of Placostylus porphyrostomus porphyrostomus (L. Pfeiffer, 1853)
- Placostylus dupuyi Kobelt, 1890: synonym of Placostylus eddystonensis bavayi (Crosse & Marie, 1868) (junior synonym)
- Placostylus elobatus (A. A. Gould, 1846): synonym of Callistocharis elobatus (A. A. Gould, 1846) (superseded combination)
- Placostylus falcicula (Gassies, 1871): synonym of Placostylus fibratus fibratus (Martyn, 1784)
- Placostylus founaki (Rousseau, 1854): synonym of Eumecostylus founaki (Hombron & Jacquinot, 1847)
- Placostylus francoisi Mabille, 1895: synonym of Poecilocharis bicolor (Hartman, 1889) (junior synonym)
- Placostylus gizoensis Clench, 1941: synonym of Maoristylus bivaricosus (Gaskoin, 1855) (junior synonym)
- Placostylus goulvainensis Kobelt, 1891: synonym of Placostylus porphyrostomus smithii Kobelt, 1891 (junior synonym)
- Placostylus guestieri (Gassies, 1869): synonym of Placostylus fibratus guestieri (Gassies, 1869)
- Placostylus guppyi E. A. Smith, 1892: synonym of Eumecostylus guppyi (E. A. Smith, 1892) (original combination)
- Placostylus hienguensis Crosse, 1871: synonym of Placostylus eddystonensis (L. Pfeiffer, 1855) (junior synonym)
- Placostylus hongii (R. P. Lesson, 1830): synonym of Maoristylus hongii (R. P. Lesson, 1830) (superseded combination)
- Placostylus houailouensis Dautzenberg, 1901: synonym of Placostylus fibratus alexander (Crosse, 1855) (junior synonym)
- Placostylus kanalensis (L. Pfeiffer, 1877): synonym of Placostylus fibratus alexander (Crosse, 1855) (junior synonym)
- Placostylus layardi Kobelt, 1891: synonym of Placostylus bondeensis rossiteri (Brazier, 1881) (junior synonym)
- Placostylus leucolenus Crosse, 1896: synonym of Placostylus fibratus fibratus (Martyn, 1784)
- Placostylus loyaltyensis (Souverbie, 1879): synonym of Leucocharis loyaltyensis (Souverbie, 1879)
- Placostylus manni Clapp, 1923: synonym of Eumecostylus manni (Clapp, 1923) (basionym)
- Placostylus mariei (Crosse & P. Fischer, 1867): synonym of Placostylus porphyrostomus mariei (Crosse & P. Fischer, 1867)
- Placostylus miltocheilus (Reeve, 1848): synonym of Aspastus miltocheilus (Reeve, 1848)
- Placostylus ouveanus (Mousson, 1869): synonym of Placostylus fibratus ouveanus (Mousson, 1869)
- Placostylus palmarum (Mousson, 1869): synonym of Placocharis palmarum (Mousson, 1869)
- Placostylus paravicinianus B. Rensch, 1934: synonym of Eumecostylus paravicinianus (B. Rensch, 1934) (original combination)
- Placostylus poyensis Kobelt, 1891: synonym of Placostylus porphyrostomus mariei (Crosse & P. Fischer, 1867) (superseded combination)
- Placostylus priscus A. W. B. Powell, 1938: synonym of Maoristylus ambagiosus (Suter, 1907)
- Placostylus pseudocaledonicus (Montrouzier in Crosse, 1859): synonym of Placostylus scarabus (Albers, 1854) (junior synonym)
- Placostylus pyrostomus (L. Pfeiffer, 1860): synonym of Santacharis salomonis (L. Pfeiffer, 1852) (junior synonym)
- Placostylus remotus Hedley, 1898: synonym of Partula remota (Hedley, 1898) (original combination)
- Placostylus salomonis (Pfeiffer, 1853): synonym of Santacharis salomonis (L. Pfeiffer, 1853) (superseded combination)
- Placostylus sanchristovalensis (Cox, 1870): synonym of Eumecostylus sanchristovalensis (Cox, 1870)
- Placostylus savesi Crosse, 1886: synonym of Placostylus eddystonensis savesi Crosse, 1886
- Placostylus saxtoni Kobelt, 1891: synonym of Placostylus caledonicus (Petit, 1845) (junior synonym)
- Placostylus scottii (Cox, 1873): synonym of Eumecostylus scottii (Cox, 1873)
- Placostylus seemanni (Dohrn, 1861): synonym of Euplacostylus seemanni (Dohrn, 1861)
- Placostylus singularis (Morelet, 1857): synonym of Placostylus porphyrostomus porphyrostomus (L. Pfeiffer, 1853) (junior synonym)
- Placostylus sinistrorsa (Crosse, 1884): synonym of Placostylus fibratus ouveanus (Mousson, 1869) (based on unavailable original name)
- Placostylus smithii Kobelt, 1891: synonym of Placostylus porphyrostomus smithii Kobelt, 1891 (basionym)
- Placostylus souvillei (Morelet, 1857): synonym of Placostylus fibratus souvillei (Morelet, 1857)
- Placostylus stutchburyi (L. Pfeiffer, 1860): synonym of Placocharis stutchburyi (L. Pfeiffer, 1860)
- Placostylus superfasciatus (Gassies, 1871): synonym of Placostylus fibratus fibratus (Martyn, 1784) (junior synonym)
- Placostylus unicus B. Rensch, 1934: synonym of Eumecostylus unicus (B. Rensch, 1934) (original combination)
