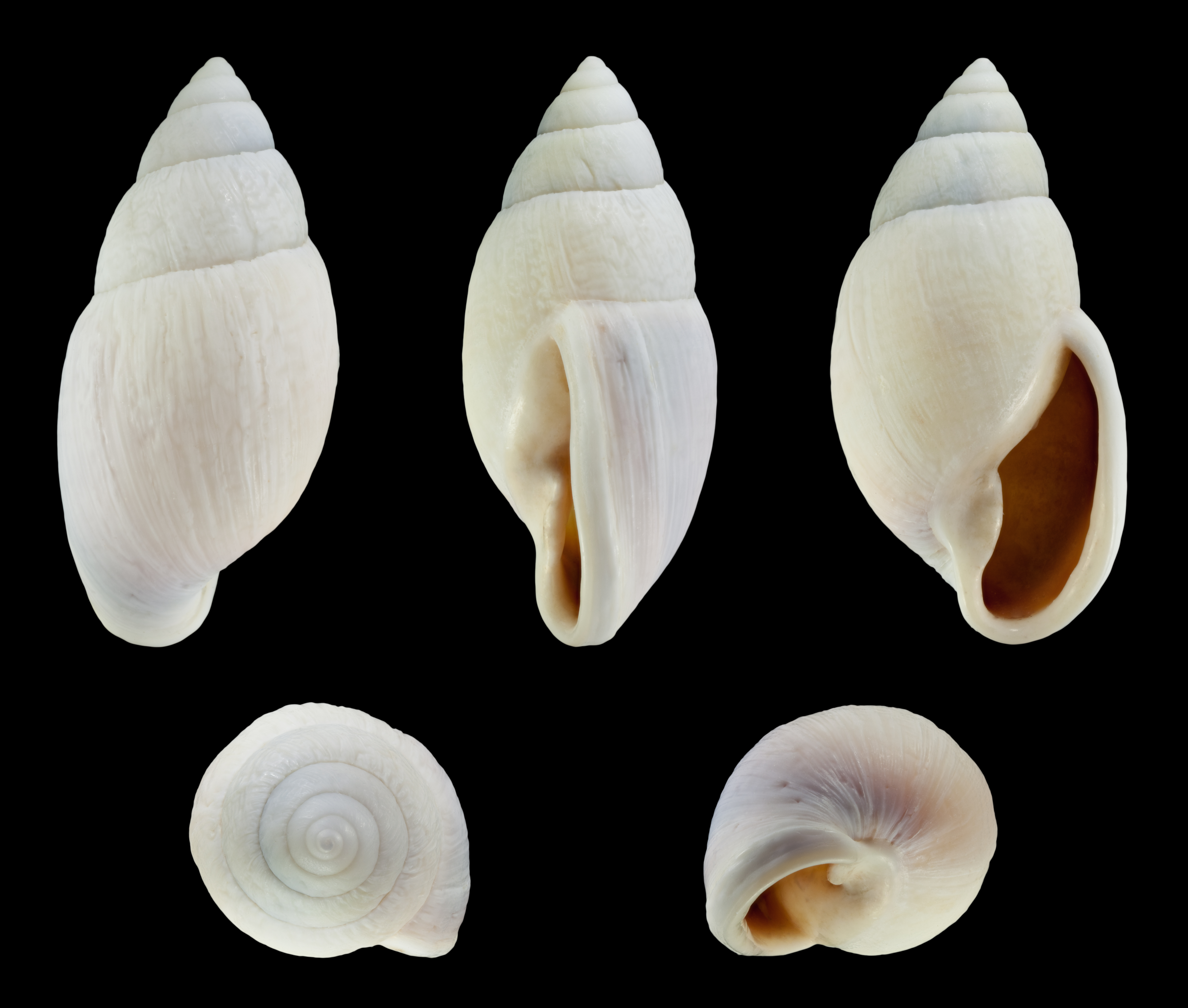

Conservation status
- Vulnerable (IUCN 2.3)

Scientific classification
- Kingdom: Animalia
- Phylum: Mollusca
- Class: Gastropoda
- Order: Stylommatophora
- Family: Bothriembryontidae
- Subfamily: Placostylinae
- Genus: Placostylus
- Species: P. porphyrostomus

Binomial name
- Placostylus porphyrostomus Pfeiffer, 1851

Synonyms
- Bulimus porphyrostomus L. Pfeiffer, 1853

= Placostylus porphyrostomus =

Species of gastropod

Placostylus porphyrostomus is a species of large air-breathing land snail, a pulmonate gastropod mollusk in the family Bothriembryontidae.

Subspecies

- Placostylus porphyrostomus mariei (Crosse & P. Fischer, 1867)
- Placostylus porphyrostomus monackensis (Crosse, 1888)
- Placostylus porphyrostomus porphyrostomus (L. Pfeiffer, 1853)
- Placostylus porphyrostomus smithii Kobelt, 1891

== Distribution ==
This species is endemic to New Caledonia.
