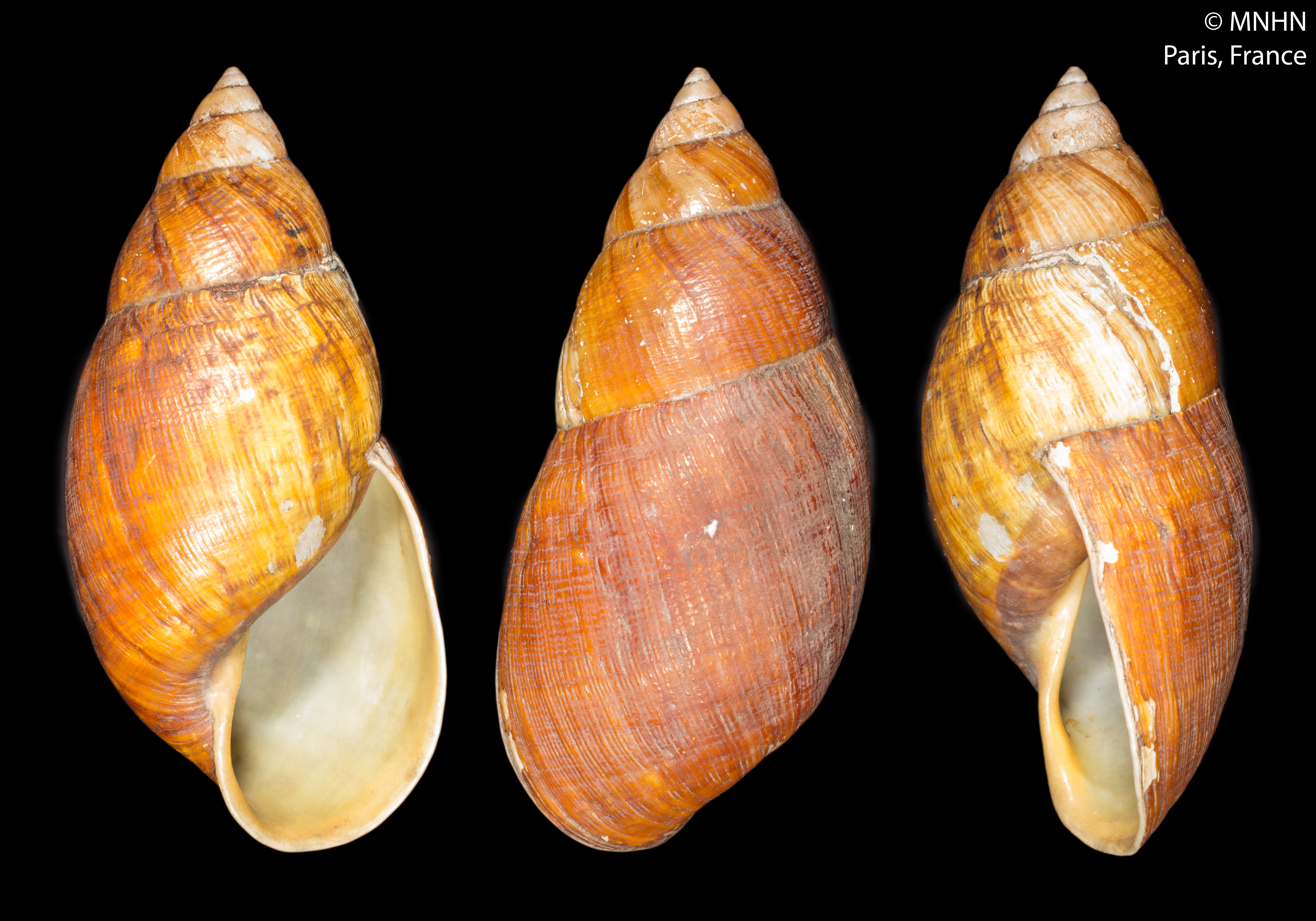
- Shell of Placostylus eddystonensis (syntype at MNHN, Paris)

Conservation status
- Vulnerable (IUCN 2.3)

Scientific classification
- Kingdom: Animalia
- Phylum: Mollusca
- Class: Gastropoda
- Order: Stylommatophora
- Family: Bothriembryontidae
- Subfamily: Placostylinae
- Genus: Placostylus
- Species: P. eddystonensis

Binomial name
- Placostylus eddystonensis Pfeiffer, 1855

Synonyms
- Bulimus eddystonensis L. Pfeiffer, 1855 (original combination); Placostylus hienguensis Crosse, 1871 (junior synonym)

= Placostylus eddystonensis =

Species of gastropod

Placostylus eddystonensis is a species of air-breathing land snail, a pulmonate gastropod mollusk in the family Bothriembryontidae.

Subspecies:

- Placostylus eddystonensis bavayi (Crosse & Marie, 1868)
- Placostylus eddystonensis eddystonensis (L. Pfeiffer, 1855)
- Placostylus eddystonensis savesi Crosse, 1886

== Subspecies ==
This species is endemic to New Caledonia.
