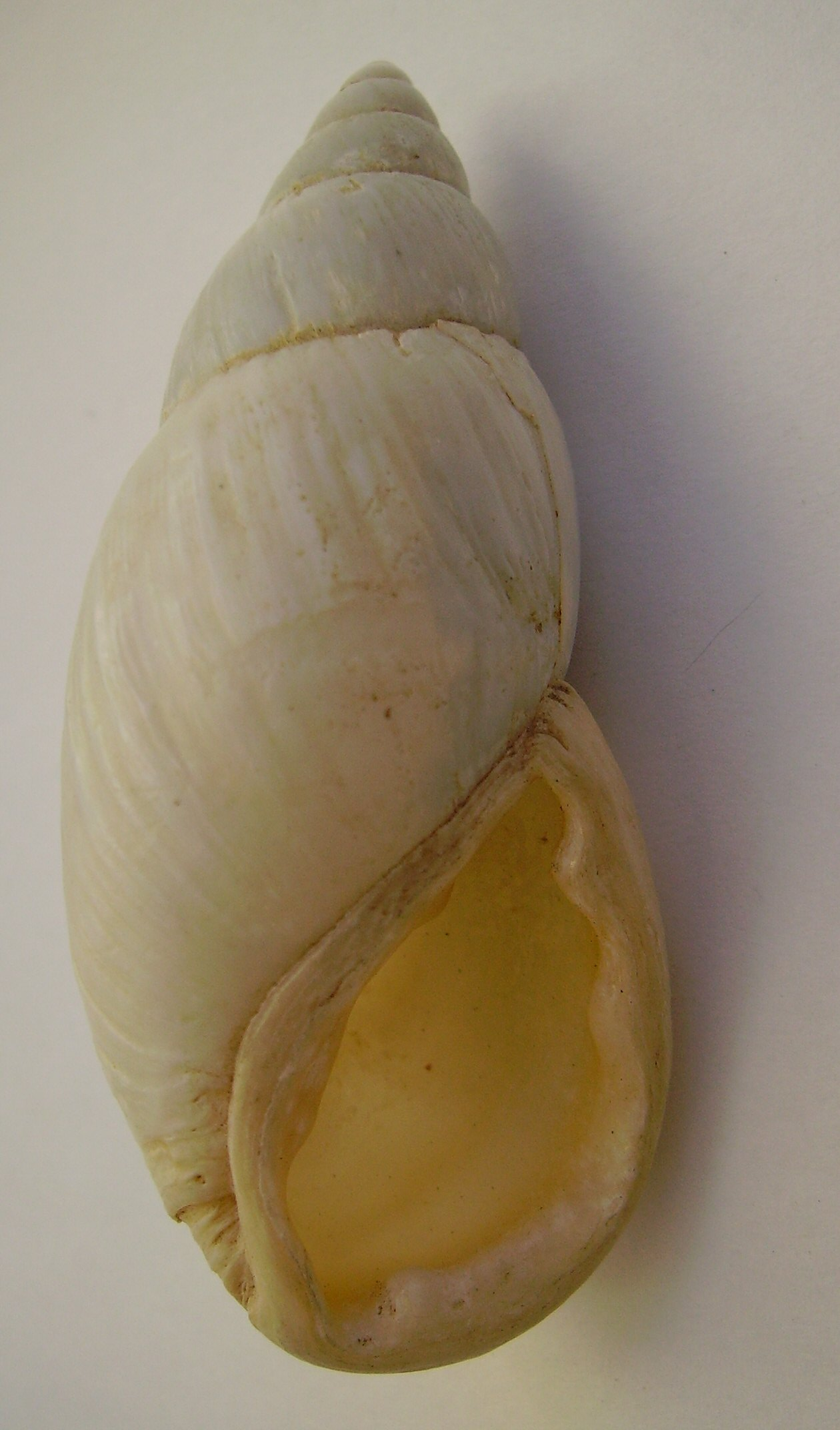
- A shell of Maoristylus ambagiosus

Conservation status
- Vulnerable (IUCN 2.3)

Scientific classification
- Kingdom: Animalia
- Phylum: Mollusca
- Class: Gastropoda
- Order: Stylommatophora
- Family: Bothriembryontidae
- Genus: Maoristylus
- Species: M. ambagiosus

Binomial name
- Maoristylus ambagiosus (Suter, 1906)

Synonyms
- Placostylus (Maoristylus) ambagiosus Suter, 1907; Placostylus (Maoristylus) ambagiosus ambagiosus Suter, 1907; Placostylus (Maoristylus) ambagiosus annectens A. W. B. Powell, 1938; Placostylus (Maoristylus) ambagiosus consobrinus A. W. B. Powell, 1938; Placostylus (Maoristylus) ambagiosus gardneri A. W. B. Powell, 1951; Placostylus (Maoristylus) ambagiosus hancoxi A. W. B. Powell, 1951; Placostylus (Maoristylus) ambagiosus hinemoa A. W. B. Powell, 1947; Placostylus (Maoristylus) ambagiosus keenorum A. W. B. Powell, 1947; Placostylus (Maoristylus) ambagiosus lesleyae A. W. B. Powell, 1947; Placostylus (Maoristylus) ambagiosus michiei A. W. B. Powell, 1951; Placostylus (Maoristylus) ambagiosus pandora A. W. B. Powell, 1951; Placostylus (Maoristylus) ambagiosus paraspiritus A. W. B. Powell, 1951; Placostylus (Maoristylus) ambagiosus priscus A. W. B. Powell, 1938; Placostylus (Maoristylus) ambagiosus spiritus A. W. B. Powell, 1947; Placostylus (Maoristylus) ambagiosus watti A. W. B. Powell, 1947; Placostylus (Maoristylus) ambagiosus whareana A. W. B. Powell, 1951; Placostylus (Maoristylus) ambagiosus worthyi A. W. B. Powell, 1947; Placostylus ambagiosus Suter, 1907; Placostylus ambagiosus ambagiosus Suter, 1907; Placostylus ambagiosus annectens A. W. B. Powell, 1938; Placostylus ambagiosus consobrinus A. W. B. Powell, 1938; Placostylus ambagiosus priscus A. W. B. Powell, 1938; Placostylus hongii ambagiosus Suter, 1907; Placostylus priscus A. W. B. Powell, 1938

= Maoristylus ambagiosus =

Species of gastropod

Maoristylus ambagiosus is a species of flax snail (Māori: pūpū whakarongotaua), a large air-breathing land snail, a terrestrial pulmonate gastropod mollusc in the family Bothriembryontidae.

== Description ==
This snail has a large (43–97 millimetres or 1.7–3.8 inches long) shell, which is heavily calcified. The size of the adult shell is habitat dependent, but the shell shape is not plastic. Maoristylus ambagiosus is highly valued by Te Aupōuri me Ngāti Kurī (the indigenous people of northern New Zealand) as a food source, musical instrument and in the past this snail provided alarm calls at night warning of approaching invaders.

== Distribution ==
This land snail species occurs in New Zealand. It is restricted to a small fragmented area of Northland Region, including the Aupouri Peninsula and Motuopao Island. In the past local Māori moved and propagated populations of Maoristylus ambagiosus, so today at least three extant populations are found on old pā sites (fortified settlements), along with other species that were cultivated such as karaka (Corynocarpus laevigatus) and harakeke (Phormium tenax).

== Biology ==
This snail feeds at night on fallen leaves on the forest floor. A favorite plant species is hangehange (Geniostoma ligustrifolium). Maoristylus ambagiosus needs year round moisture provided by deep leaf-litter. Eggs are laid in clutches (average 43 eggs) in the shallow hollows in the soil. The species is slow-growing with a lifespan of 10–22 years and strong site fidelity The same individual snail has been found under the same food plant for 12 years. The species is endangered due to predation from rats and birds, habitat damage by pigs and horses and competition from introduced snails.

== Hypothetical subspecies ==
Based on molecular phylogeny (mtDNA) and shell morphology research it was suggested in 2011 by Buckley et al. that there are no subspecies of Maoristylus ambagiosus. However, in the past, what were thought to be eight extant subspecies and a number of undescribed but distinct populations, were named; six of these "subspecies" are now extinct (marked with a †); conservation statuses were given according to the New Zealand Threat Classification System for the extant taxa: "nationally critical" and "nationally endangered": At least five subspecies of Maoristylus ambagiosus can be recognised using shell shape (not size or location) of individuals snails suggesting these represented distinct populations that require protection.

- Maoristylus ambagiosus "Herangi Hill" †
- Maoristylus ambagiosus "nouvelle" - nationally endangered
- Maoristylus ambagiosus "Haupatoto" - nationally critical
- Maoristylus ambagiosus "Kauaetewhakapeke Stream" - nationally critical
- Maoristylus ambagiosus "Kohuronaki" - nationally critical
- Maoristylus ambagiosus "Poroiki" - nationally critical
- Maoristylus ambagiosus "Te Paki" - nationally endangered
- Maoristylus ambagiosus "Tirikawa" - nationally critical
- Maoristylus ambagiosus ambagiosus Suter, 1906 - nationally critical
- Maoristylus ambagiosus annectens Powell, 1938 2
- Maoristylus ambagiosus consobrinus Powell, 1938 - nationally critical
- Maoristylus ambagiosus gardneri †
- Maoristylus ambagiosus hancoxi 1
- Maoristylus ambagiosus hinemoa †
- Maoristylus ambagiosus keenorum Powell, 1938 - nationally endangered
- Maoristylus ambagiosus lesleyae †
- Maoristylus ambagiosus michiei Powell, 1951 - nationally endangered
- Maoristylus ambagiosus pandora Powell, 1951 - nationally critical
- Maoristylus ambagiosus paraspiritus Powell, 1951 - nationally endangered
- Maoristylus ambagiosus priscus †
- Maoristylus ambagiosus spiritus †
- Maoristylus ambagiosus watti Powell, 1947 - nationally critical
- Maoristylus ambagiosus whareana Powell, 1951 - nationally critical
- Maoristylus ambagiosus worthyi †
