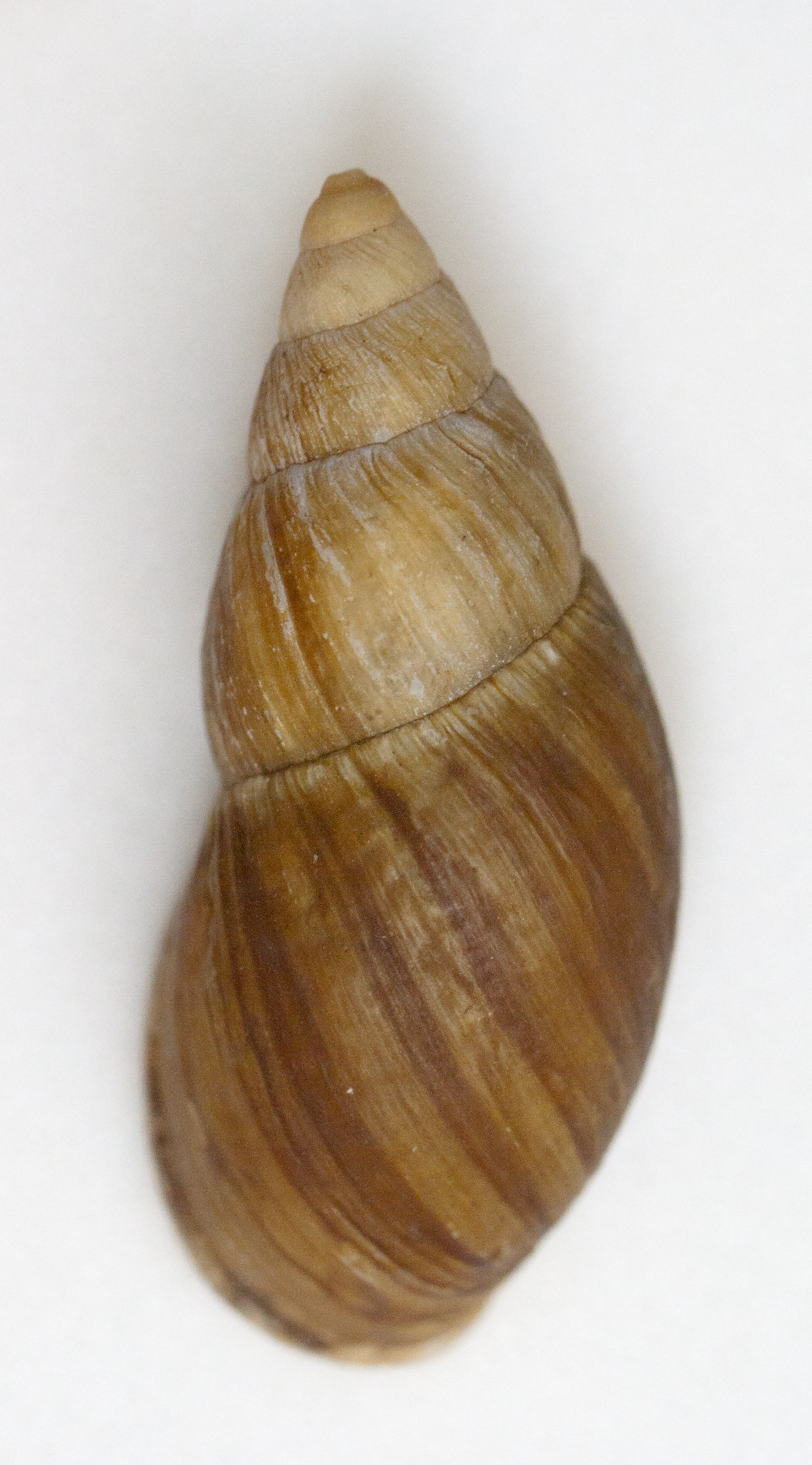

Conservation status
- Critically Endangered (IUCN 2.3)

Scientific classification
- Kingdom: Animalia
- Phylum: Mollusca
- Class: Gastropoda
- Order: Stylommatophora
- Family: Bothriembryontidae
- Subfamily: Bothriembryontinae
- Genus: Maoristylus
- Species: M. bivaricosus

Binomial name
- Maoristylus bivaricosus (Gaskoin, 1855)
- M. bivaricosus is endemic to Lord Howe Island

Synonyms
- Bulimus (Eurytus) etheridgei Brazier, 1889 (junior synonym); Bulimus (Placostylus) cuniculinsulae Cox, 1872 (junior synonym); Bulimus bivaricosus Gaskoin, 1855 (original combination); Bulimus bivaricosus etheridgei Hedley, 1891 (junior synonym); Placostylus (Maoristylus) bivaricosus (Gaskoin, 1855); Placostylus bivaricosus (Gaskoin, 1855); Placostylus bivaricosus belli Iredale, 1944 (junior synonym); Placostylus bivaricosus royi Iredale, 1944 (junior synonym); Placostylus cuniculinsulae (Cox, 1872) (junior synonym); Placostylus gizoensis Clench, 1941 (junior synonym)

= Lord Howe flax snail =

Species of gastropod

The Lord Howe flax snail or the Lord Howe placostylus, scientific name Maoristylus bivaricosus, is a species of large air-breathing land snail, a terrestrial pulmonate gastropod mollusc in the family Bothriembryontidae.

== Description ==
The Lord Howe flax snail has a brown, pointed shell up to 7 cm long and 2 cm in diameter.

== Distribution ==
This large snail is found only on Lord Howe Island off the east coast of Australia. Its conservation status has declined from common to endangered since rats were accidentally introduced to this World Heritage island in 1918.

== Conservation ==
=== Species decline ===
Historical accounts and fossil evidence indicate that the Lord Howe Island flax snail was formerly widespread and abundant on the island. The decline was first noted in the 1940s and the species is now listed as critically endangered.

The black rat is considered to be the major predator of this species and likely to be a significant threat to its survival. European blackbirds and song thrushes (self-introduced around 1950) are also thought to be predators of the snail.

Habitat clearing and modification and habitat disturbance, possibly herbicides and pesticides also add to the species decline.

=== Recovery ===
In 2001, a recovery plan was completed to protect and recover the Lord Howe Island flax snail in the wild. Actions include habitat and population surveys, community awareness raising and a captive-breeding program.

The Lord Howe Island Board, responsible for implementation of the recovery plan, has since constructed a rodent and bird proof enclosure for the project and the first generation of captive bred Lord Howe Island land snails has hatched.

Over a period of two years, schoolchildren will closely monitor the captive snail population and their eggs, and will then measure growth rates and survival rates of the juvenile snails.

Rodent control or eradication on the island is crucial for the long-term survival of this snail in the wild.
