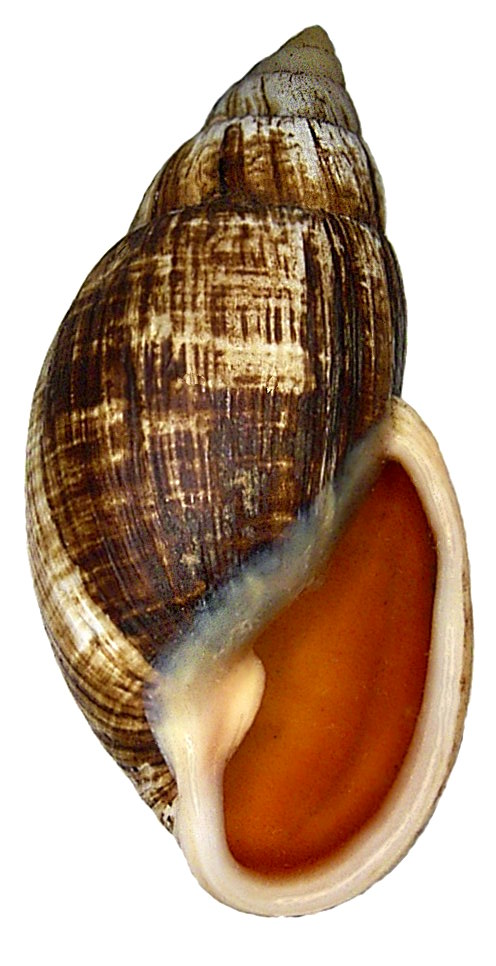

Conservation status
- Vulnerable (IUCN 2.3)

Scientific classification
- Kingdom: Animalia
- Phylum: Mollusca
- Class: Gastropoda
- Order: Stylommatophora
- Family: Bothriembryontidae
- Subfamily: Placostylinae
- Genus: Placostylus
- Species: P. fibratus

Binomial name
- Placostylus fibratus Martyn, 1789

Synonyms
- Auricula aurantiaca Schumacher, 1817; Bulimus bootis Menke, 1828; Bulimus bovinus Bruguière, 1792; Bulimus bulbulus Gassies, 1871; Ellobium australe Röding, 1798; Helix (Cochlogena) aurisbovinus Férussac, 1821; Helix aurismalchi O. F. Müller, 1774 (name suppressed by ICZN Opinion 1662); Limax fibratus Martyn, 1784 (original combination); Voluta elongata [Lightfoot], 1786 (objective synonym and placed on Official Index by ICZN 1662)

= Placostylus fibratus =

Species of gastropod

Placostylus fibratus is a species of large air-breathing land snail, a pulmonate gastropod mollusk in the family Bothriembryontidae. This species is endemic to New Caledonia.

Subspecies

- Placostylus fibratus alexander (Crosse, 1855)
- Placostylus fibratus fibratus (Martyn, 1784)
- Placostylus fibratus goroensis (Souverbie, 1870)
- Placostylus fibratus guestieri (Gassies, 1869)
- Placostylus fibratus ouveanus (Mousson, 1869)
- Placostylus fibratus souvillei (Morelet, 1857)

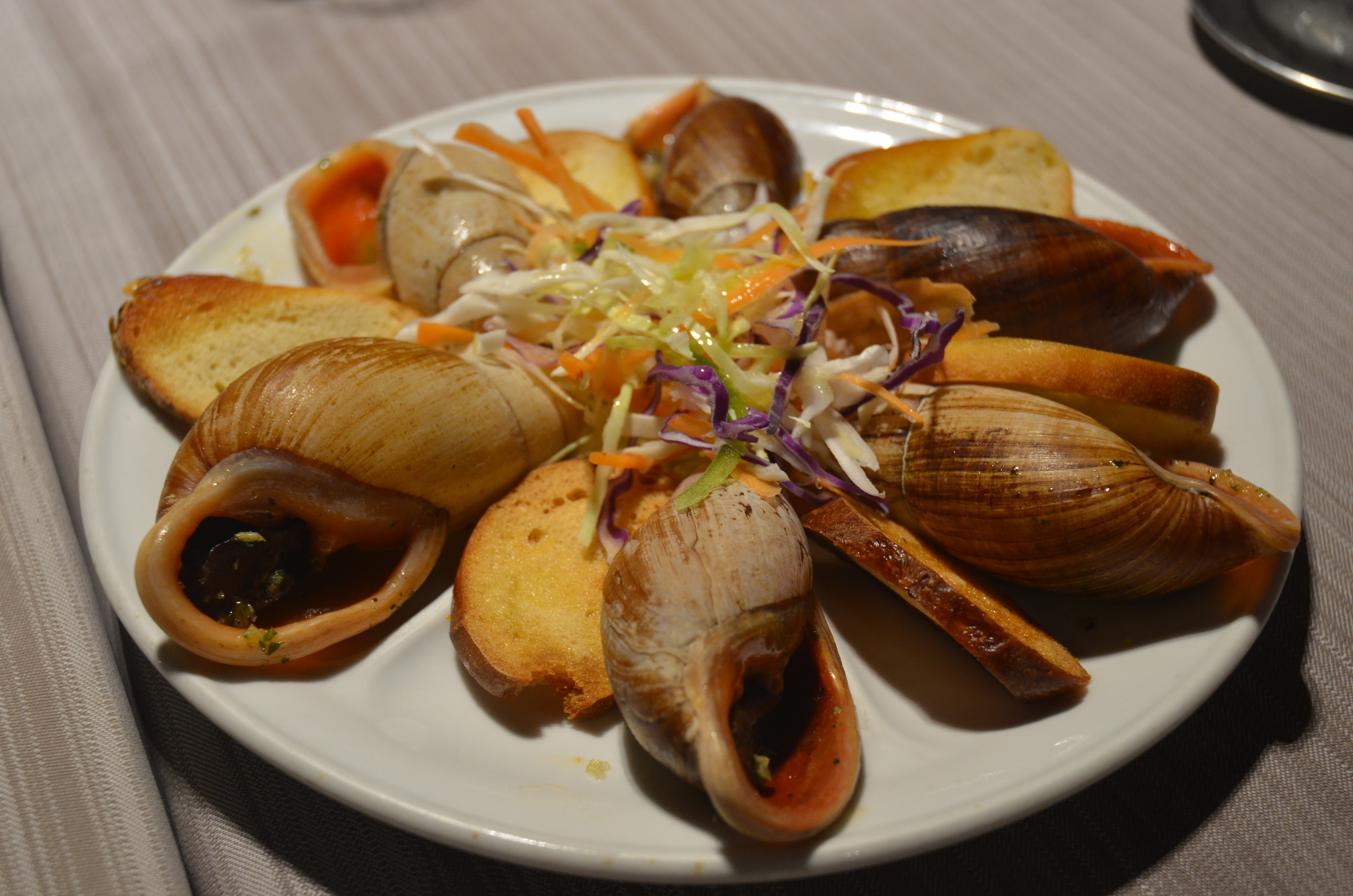
Placostylus fibratus cooked with garlic butter and served at a restaurant on Ile des Pins.

Known locally as bulime, the snails are considered a highly prized delicacy on Ile des Pins and are locally farmed to ensure supply.
