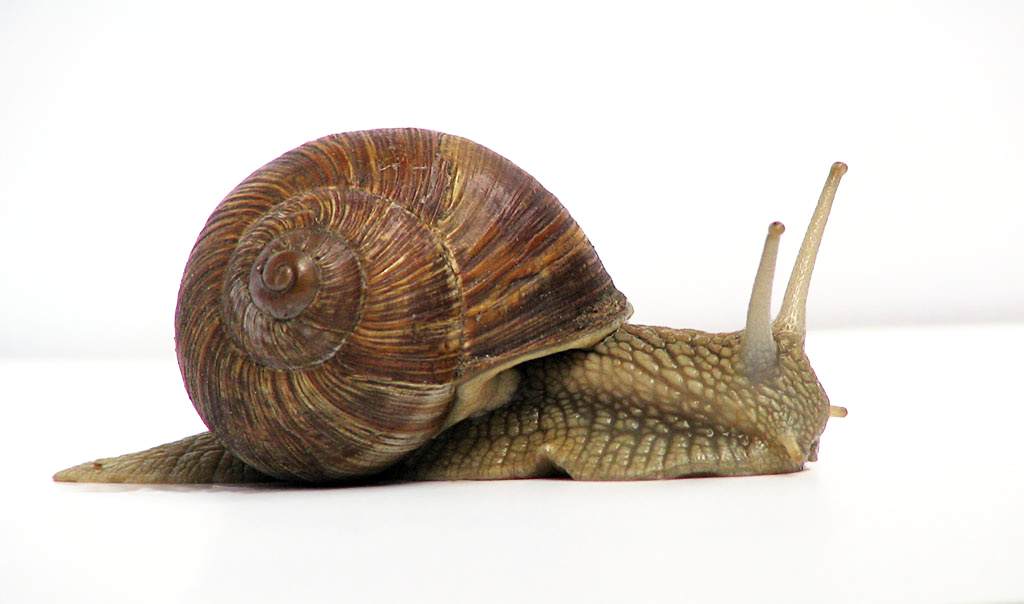
- Helix pomatia, a species of air-breathing land snail used for escargot, is a little bit larger than the common garden snail.
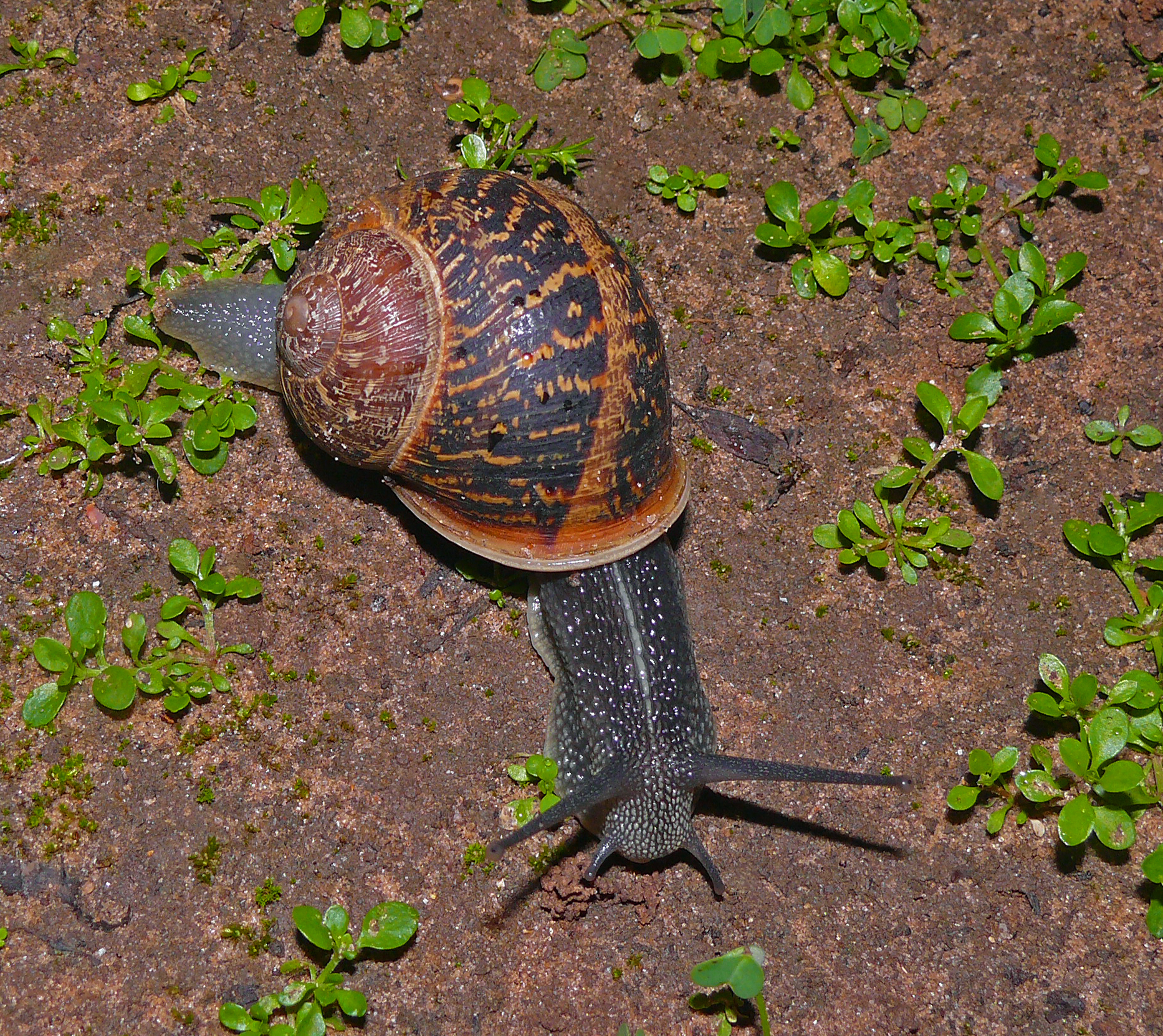
- Cornu aspersum (previously Helix aspersa) – the common garden snail – in Israel

Scientific classification
- Kingdom: Animalia
- Phylum: Mollusca
- Class: Gastropoda

Groups included
- Stylommatophora (vast majority of land snails); Various smaller groups; Cyclophoroidea; Helicinoidea; Ellobiidae; Pomatiidae

= Land snail =

Snails that live on land

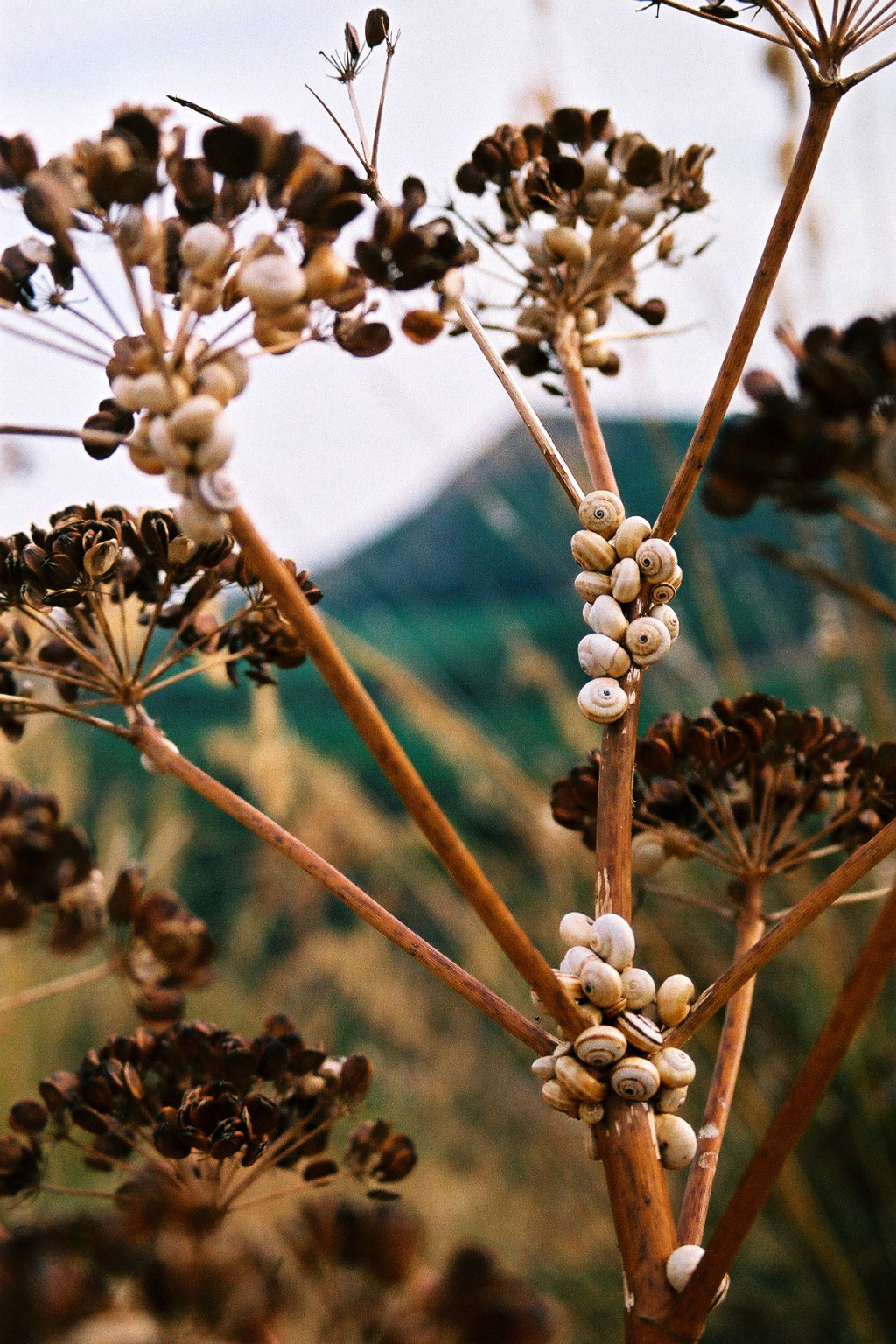
Colonies of snails in Sicily

A land snail is any of the numerous species of snail that live on land, as opposed to the sea snails and freshwater snails. Land snail is the common name for terrestrial gastropod mollusks that have shells (those without shells are known as slugs). However, it is not always easy to say which species are terrestrial, because some are more or less amphibious between land and fresh water, and others are relatively amphibious between land and salt water.

Land snails are a polyphyletic group comprising at least ten independent evolutionary transitions to terrestrial life (the last common ancestor of all gastropods was marine). The majority of land snails are pulmonates that have a lung and breathe air. Most of the non-pulmonate land snails belong to lineages in the Caenogastropoda, and tend to have a gill and an operculum. The largest clade of non-pulmonate land snails is the Cyclophoroidea, with more than 7,000 species. Many of these operculate land snails live in habitats or microhabitats that are sometimes (or often) damp or wet, such as in moss.

Land snails have a strong muscular foot; they use mucus to enable them to crawl over rough surfaces and to keep their soft bodies from drying out. Like other mollusks, land snails have a mantle, and they have one or two pairs of tentacles on their head. Their internal anatomy includes a radula and a primitive brain. In terms of reproduction, many caenogastropod land snails (e.g., diplommatinids) are dioecious, but pulmonate land snails are hermaphrodites (they have a full set of organs of both sexes) and most lay clutches of eggs in the soil. Tiny snails hatch out of the egg with a small shell in place, and the shell grows spirally as the soft parts gradually increase in size. Most land snails have shells that are right-handed in their coiling.

A wide range of different vertebrate and invertebrate animals prey on land snails. They are used as food by humans in various cultures worldwide, and are raised on farms in some areas for use as food.

== Biology ==
=== Physical characteristics ===
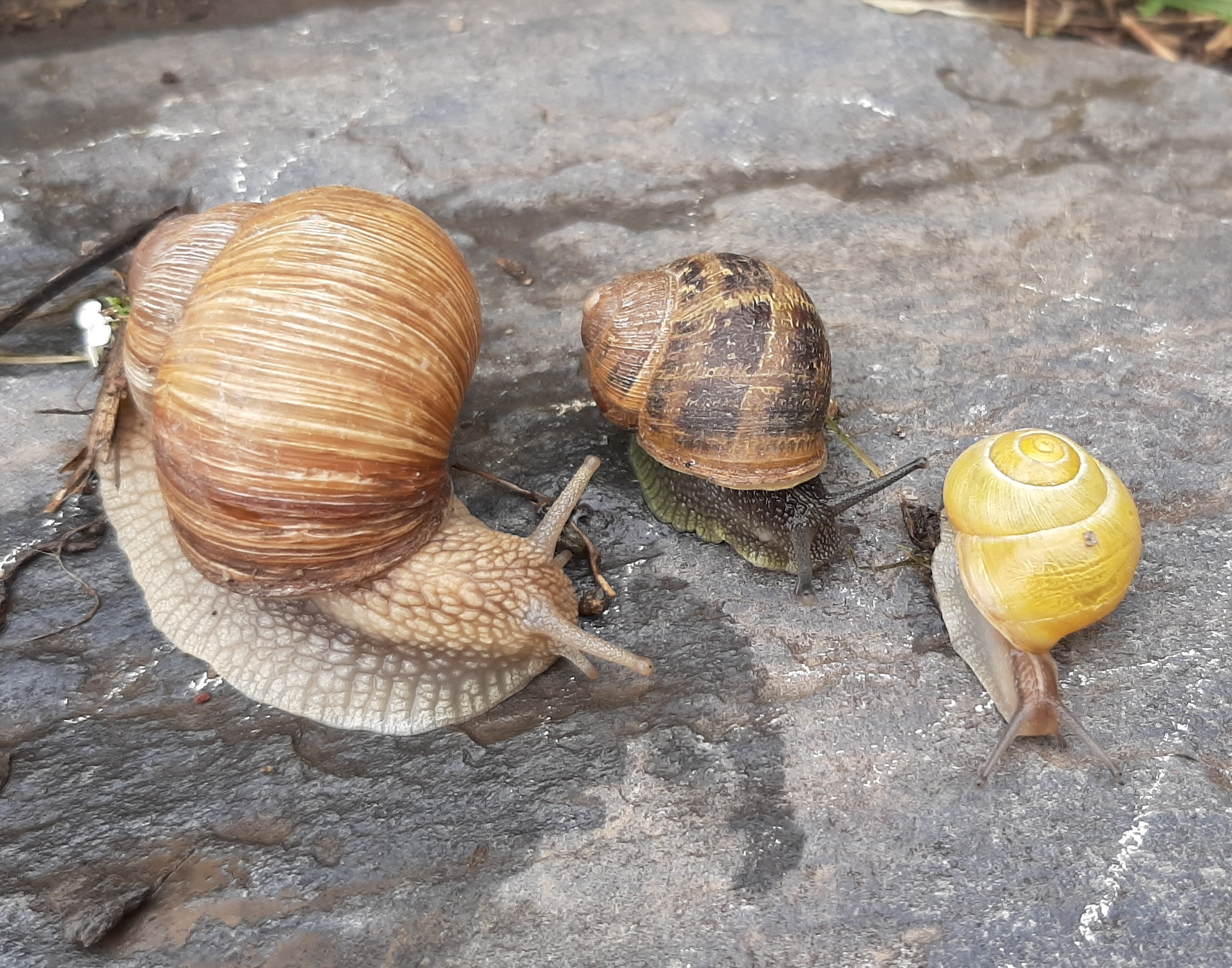
From left to right: Roman snail (Helix pomatia), Garden snail (Cornu aspersum) and White-lipped snail (Cepaea hortensis), three species of Helicinae.

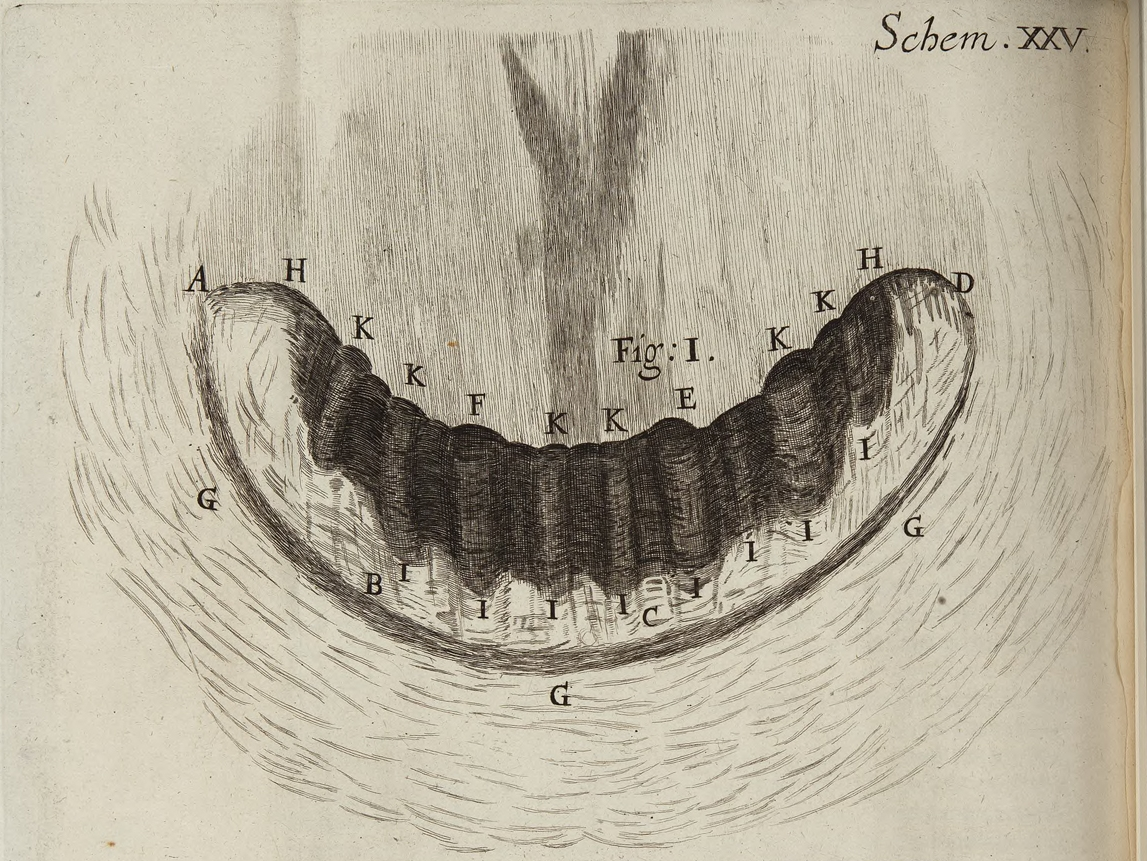
"The Teeth of a Snail" from Robert Hooke's Micrographia, 1665. This actually shows the jaw, against which the teeth on the radula act.

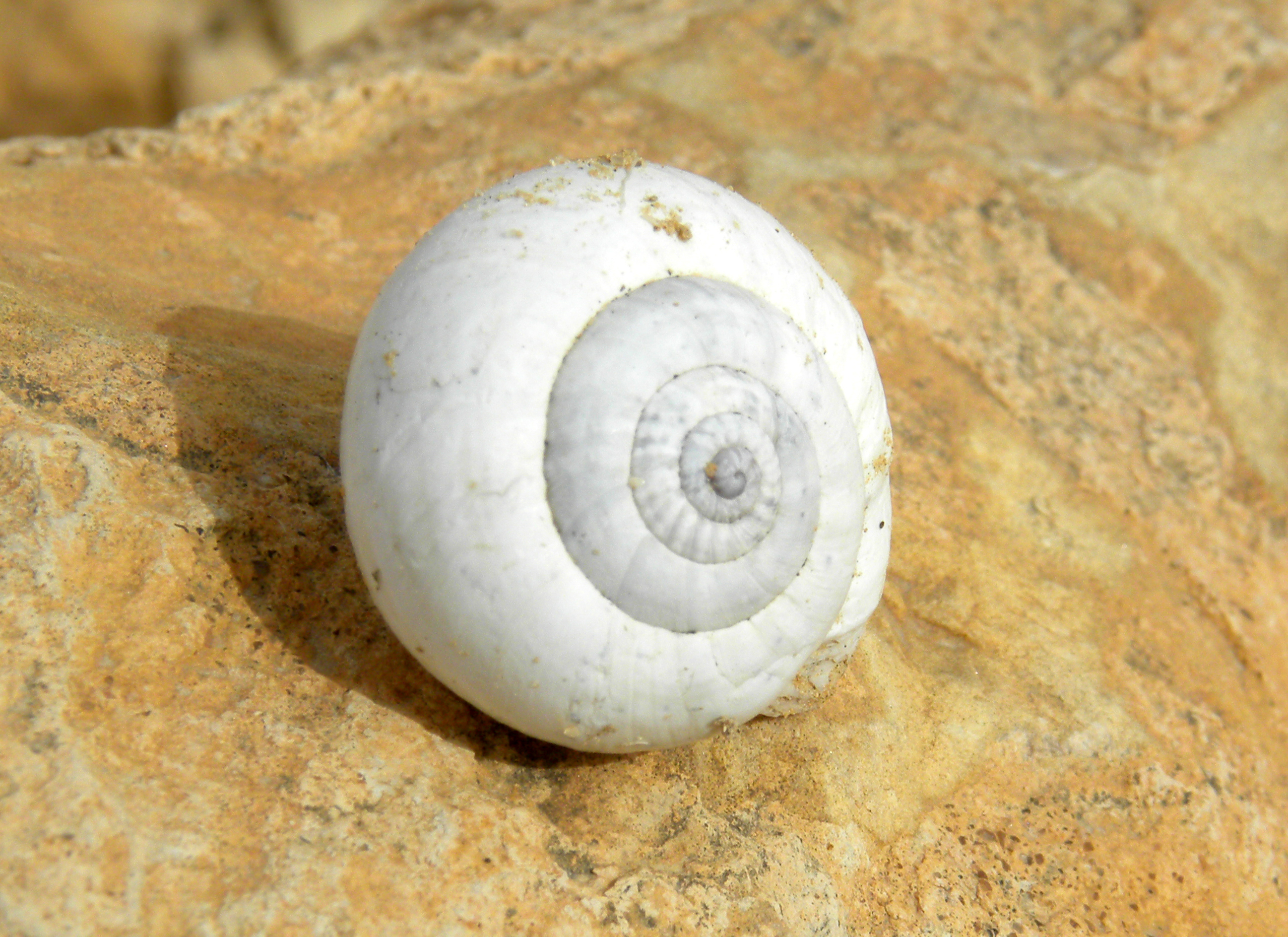
Sphincterochila zonata zonata in Hamakhtesh Hagadol, northern Negev. Diameter is 2.1 cm.

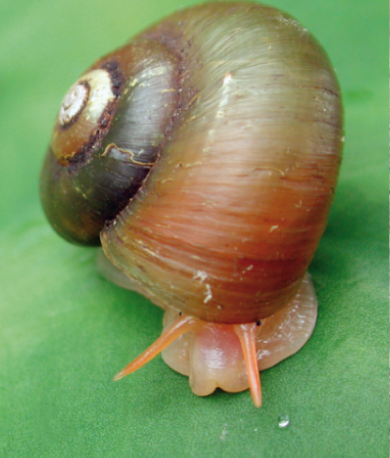
Amphicyclotulus amethystinus, a species of non-pulmonate land snail in the superfamily Cyclophoroidea.

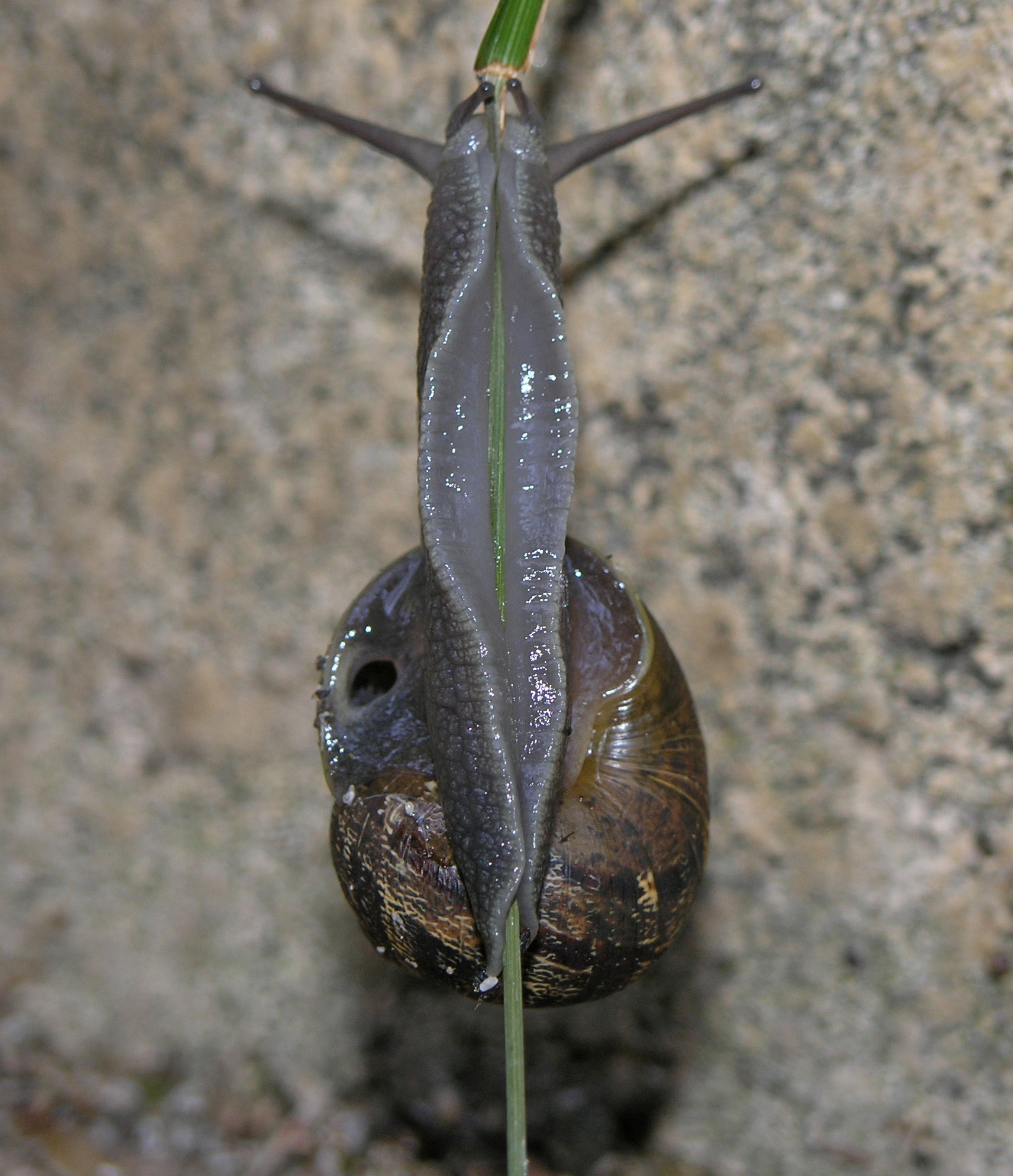
Underside of a snail climbing a blade of grass, showing the muscular foot and the pneumostome or respiratory pore on the animal's right side

Land snails move by gliding along on their muscular foot, which is lubricated with mucus and covered with epithelial cilia. This motion is powered by succeeding waves of muscular contractions that move down the ventral of the foot. This muscular action is clearly visible when a snail is crawling on the glass of a window or aquarium. Snails move at a proverbially low speed (1 mm/s is a typical speed for adult Helix lucorum). Snails secrete mucus externally to keep their soft bodies from drying out. They also secrete mucus from the foot to aid in locomotion by reducing friction, and to help reduce the risk of mechanical injury from sharp objects, meaning they can crawl over a sharp edge like a straight razor and not be injured. The mucus that land snails secrete with the foot leaves a slime trail behind them, which is often visible for some hours afterwards as a shiny "path" on the surface over which they have crawled.

Snails (like all molluscs) also have a mantle, a specialized layer of tissue which covers all of the internal organs as they are grouped together in the visceral mass. The mantle also extends outward in flaps which reach to the edge of the shell and in some cases can cover the shell, and which are partially retractable. The mantle is attached to the shell, and creates the shell and makes shell growth possible by secretion.

Most molluscs, including land snails, have a shell which is part of their anatomy since the larval stage. When they are active, the organs such as the lung, heart, kidney, and intestines remain inside the shell; only the head and foot emerge. The shell grows with them in size by the process of secreting calcium carbonate along the open edge and on the inner side for extra strength. Although some land snails create shells that are almost entirely formed from the protein conchiolin, most land snails need a good supply of calcium in their diet and environment to produce a strong shell. A lack of calcium, or low pH in their surroundings, can result in thin, cracked, or perforated shells. Usually, a snail can repair damage to its shell over time if its living conditions improve, but severe damage can be fatal. When retracted into their shells, many snails with gills (including some terrestrial species) are able to protect themselves with a door-like anatomical structure called an operculum.

Land snails range greatly in size. The largest living species is the giant African snail or Ghana Tiger Snail (Achatina achatina; Family Achatinidae), which can measure up to 30 cm. The largest land snails of non-tropical Eurasia are endemic Caucasian snails Helix buchi and Helix goderdziana from the south-eastern Black Sea area in Georgia and Turkey; diameter of the shell of the latter may exceed 6 cm. At the other end of the size spectrum is Angustopila psammion, a species with shell diameter of 0.60-0.68 mm.

Most land snails bear one or two pairs of tentacles on their heads. In most land snails the eyes are carried on the first (upper) set of tentacles (called ommatophores or more informally 'eye stalks') which are usually roughly 75% of the width of the eyes. The second (lower) set of tentacles act as olfactory organs. Both sets of tentacles are retractable in land snails.

=== Digestion and nervous system ===
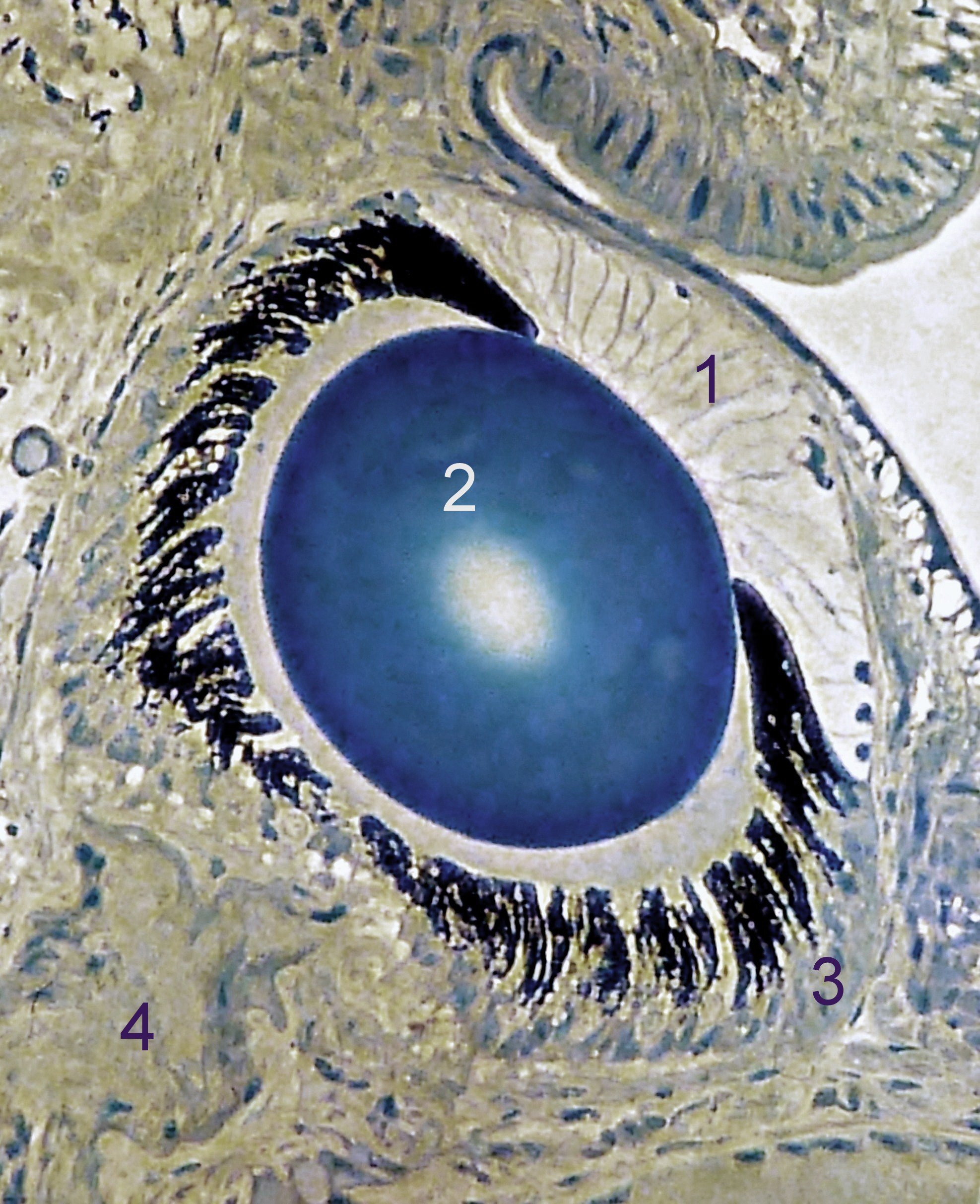
Light micrograph of a section through a snail's eye (Helix pomatia). 1 anterior chamber, 2 lens in the posterior chamber, 3 retina, 4 optic nerve

The anatomy of a common snail

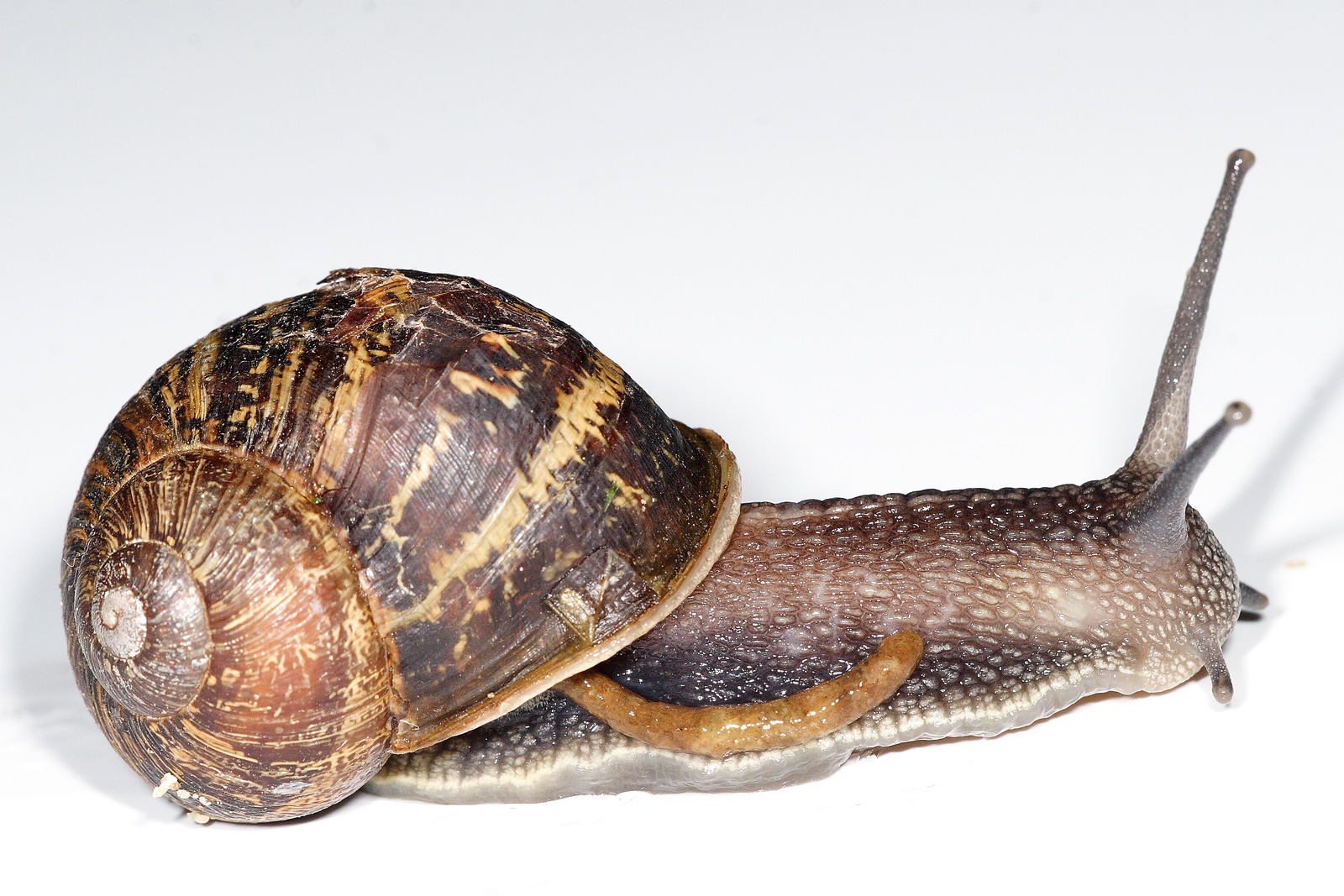
Garden snail (Cornu aspersum) defecating

A snail breaks up its food using the radula inside its mouth. The radula is a chitinous ribbon-like structure containing rows of microscopic teeth. With this the snail scrapes at food, which is then transferred to the digestive tract. In a very quiet setting, a large land snail can be heard 'crunching' its food: the radula is tearing away at the surface of the food that the snail is eating.

The cerebral ganglia of the snail form a primitive brain which is divided into four sections. This structure is very much simpler than the brains of mammals, reptiles and birds, but nonetheless, snails are capable of associative learning.

=== Respiration ===
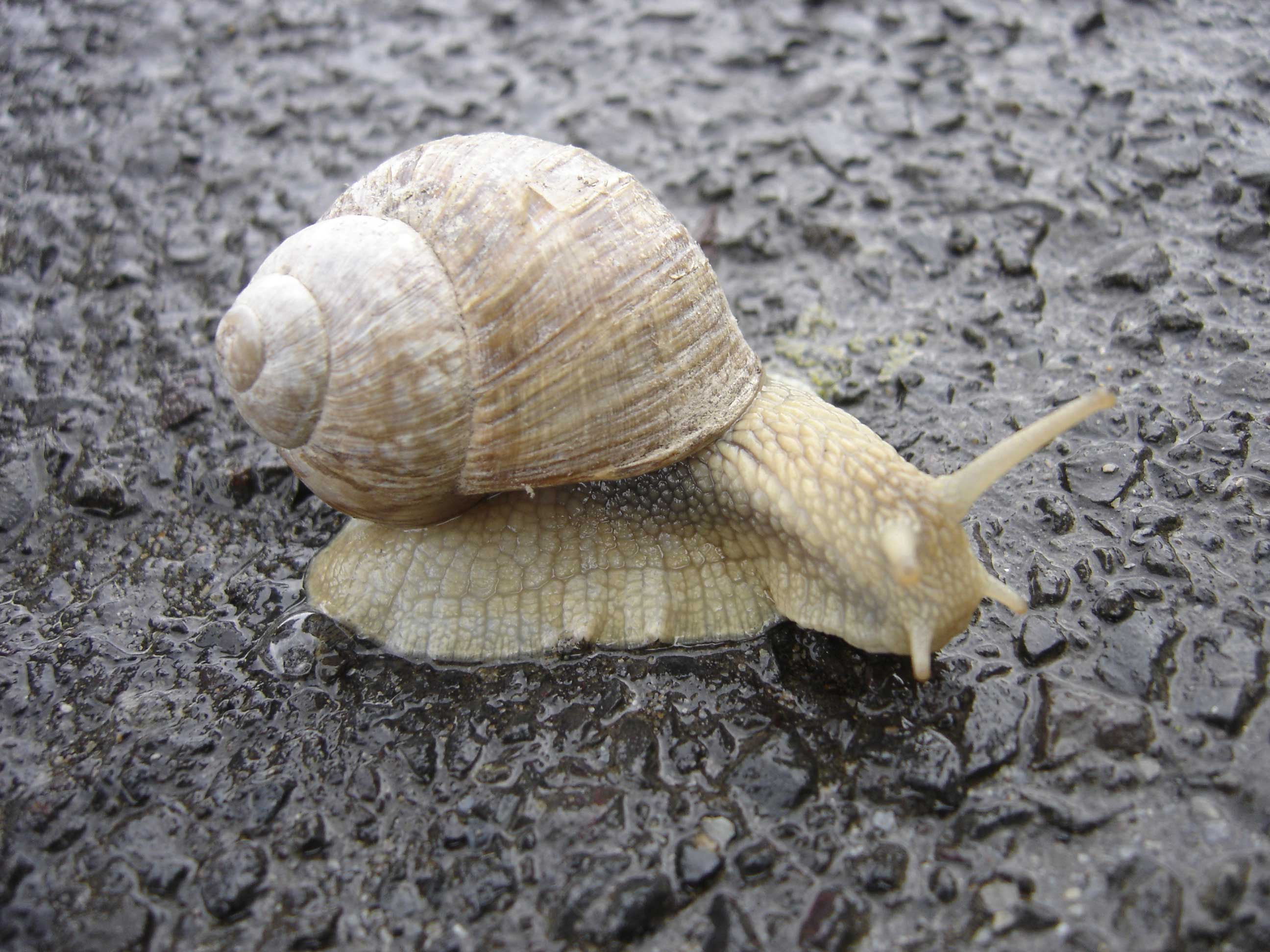
Burgundy snail (H. pomatia)

Oxygen is carried by the blood pigment hemocyanin. Both oxygen and carbon dioxide diffuse in and out of blood through the capillaries. A muscular valve regulates the process of opening and closing the entrance of the lung. When the valve opens, the air can either enter or leave the lung. The valve plays an important role in reducing water loss and preventing drowning.

=== Shell ===
Growth

As the snail grows, so does its calcium carbonate shell. The shell grows additively, by the addition of new calcium carbonate, which is secreted by glands located in the snail's mantle. The new material is added to the edge of the shell aperture (the opening of the shell). Therefore, the centre of the shell's spiral was made when the snail was younger, and the outer part when the snail was older. When the snail reaches full adult size, it may build a thickened lip around the shell aperture. At this point, the snail stops growing and begins reproducing.

A snail's shell forms a logarithmic spiral. Most snail shells are right-handed or dextral in coiling, meaning that if the shell is held with the apex (the tip, or the juvenile whorls) pointing towards the observer, the spiral proceeds in a clockwise direction from the apex to the opening.

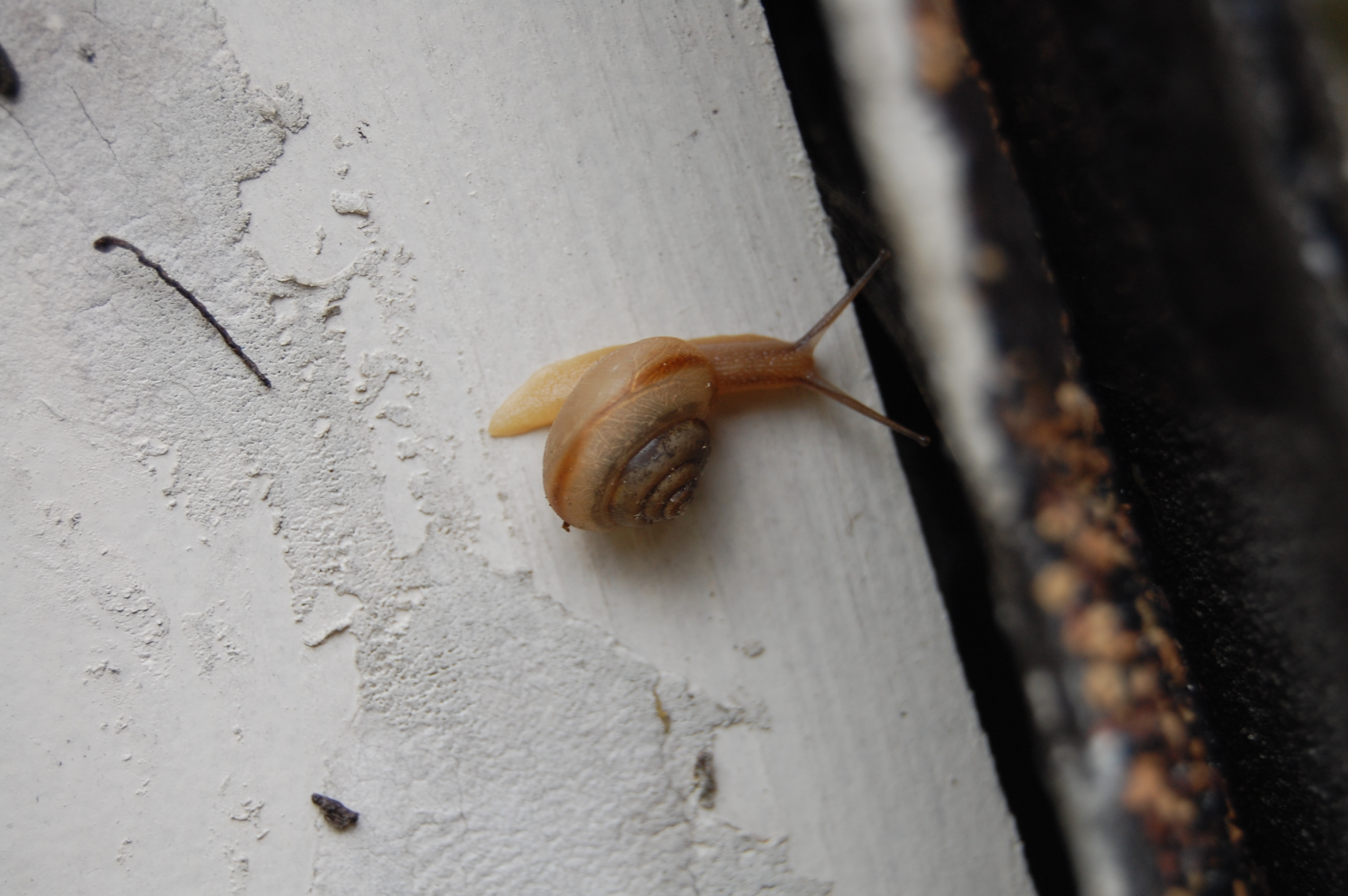
Snail with a rightwardly spiraling shell

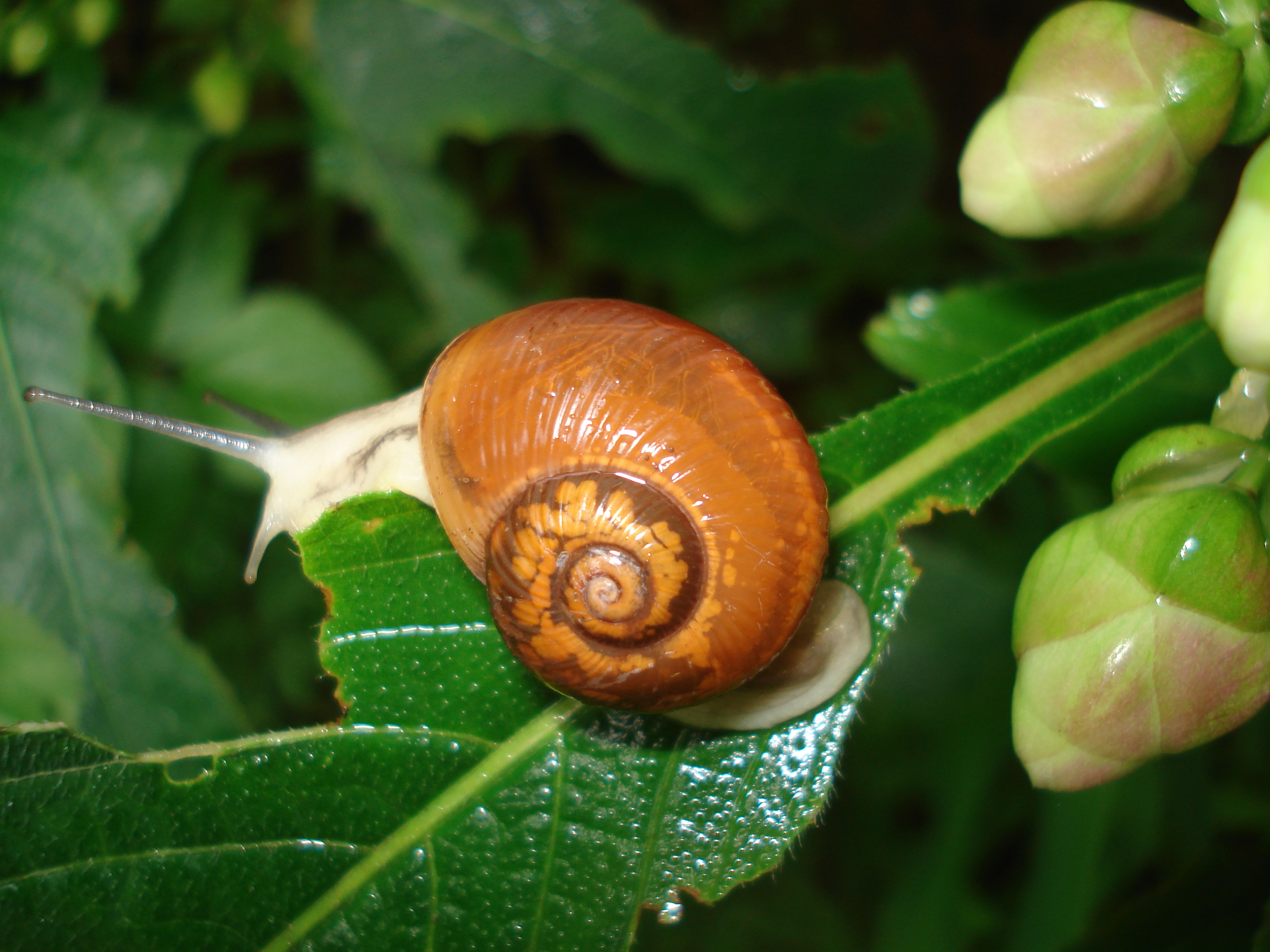
Sinistral (left-handed) species of snail from western India

Lime production

Due to high calcium carbonate content, land snail shells have potential to be used as raw material in the production of lime

=== Hibernation and estivation ===
Some snails hibernate during the winter (typically October through April in the Northern Hemisphere). They may also estivate in the summer in drought conditions. To stay moist during hibernation, a snail seals its shell opening with a dry layer of mucus called an epiphragm.

=== Reproduction ===
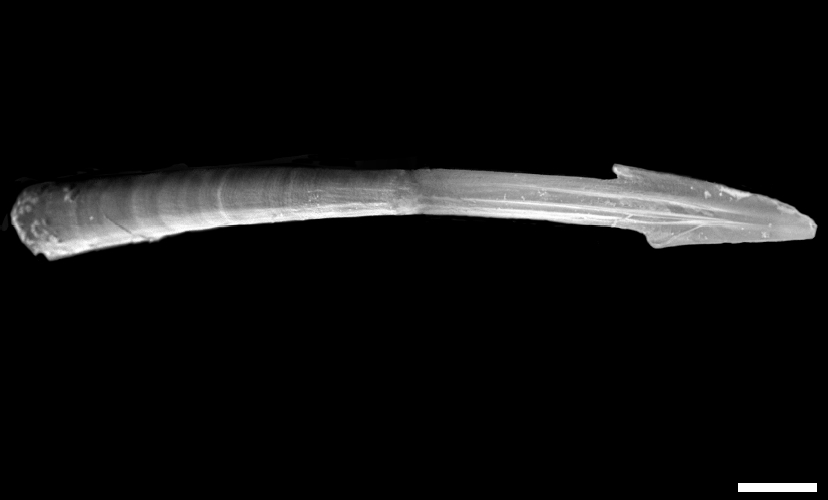
The use of love darts by the land snail Monachoides vicinus is a form of sexual selection

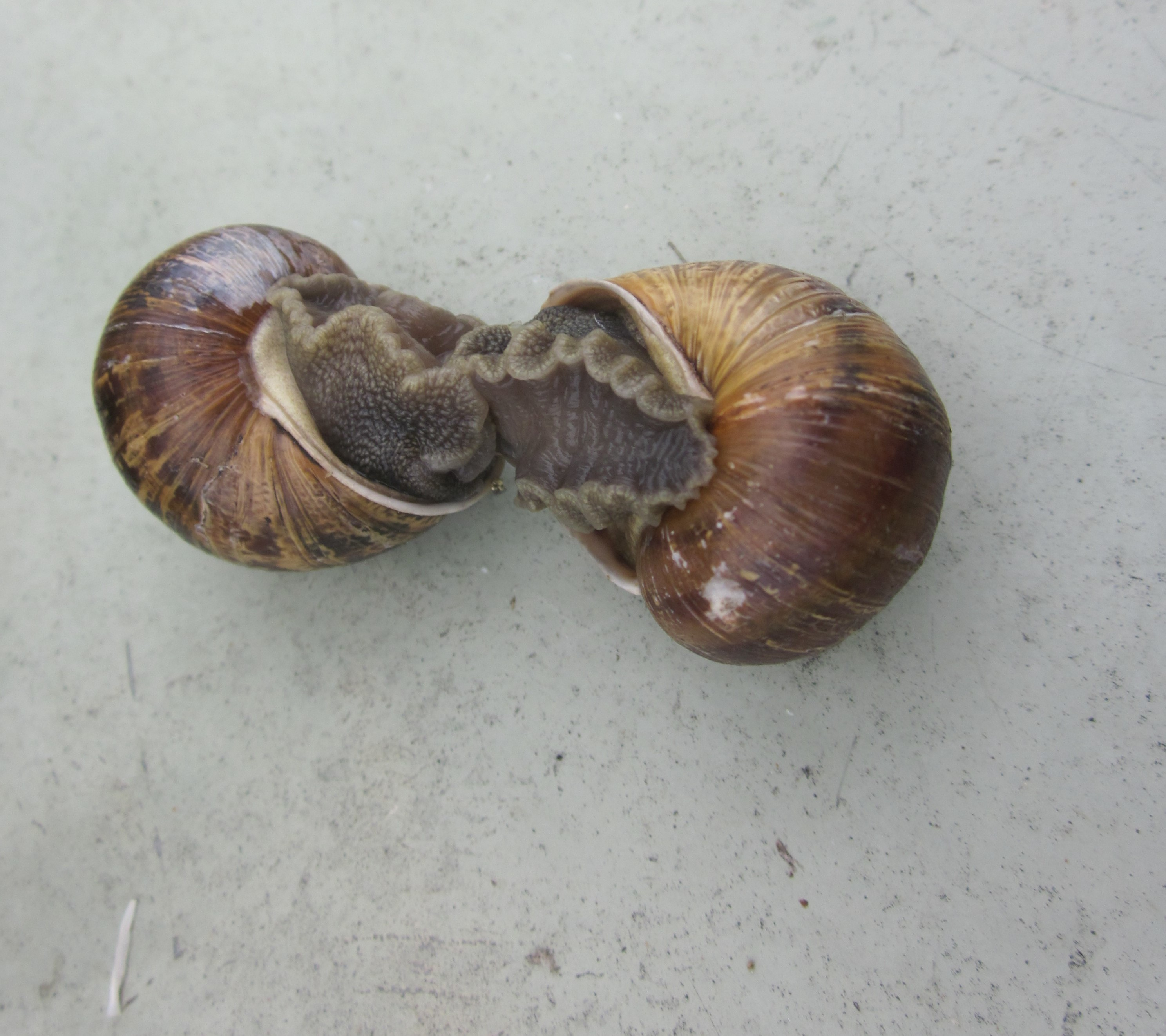
Snails mating in Los Angeles

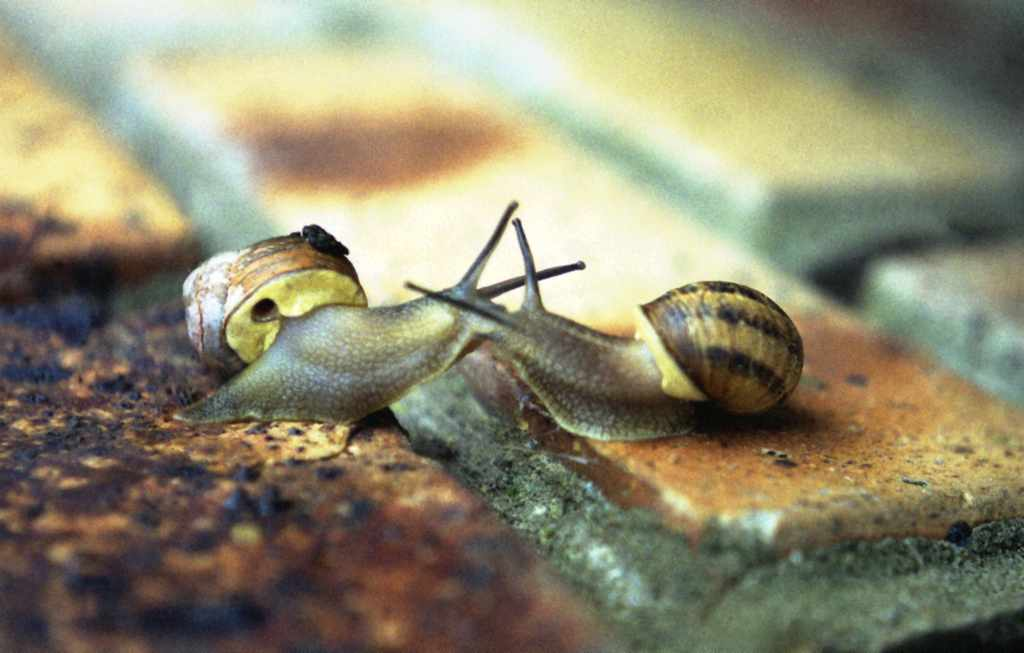
Two helicid snails make contact prior to mating.

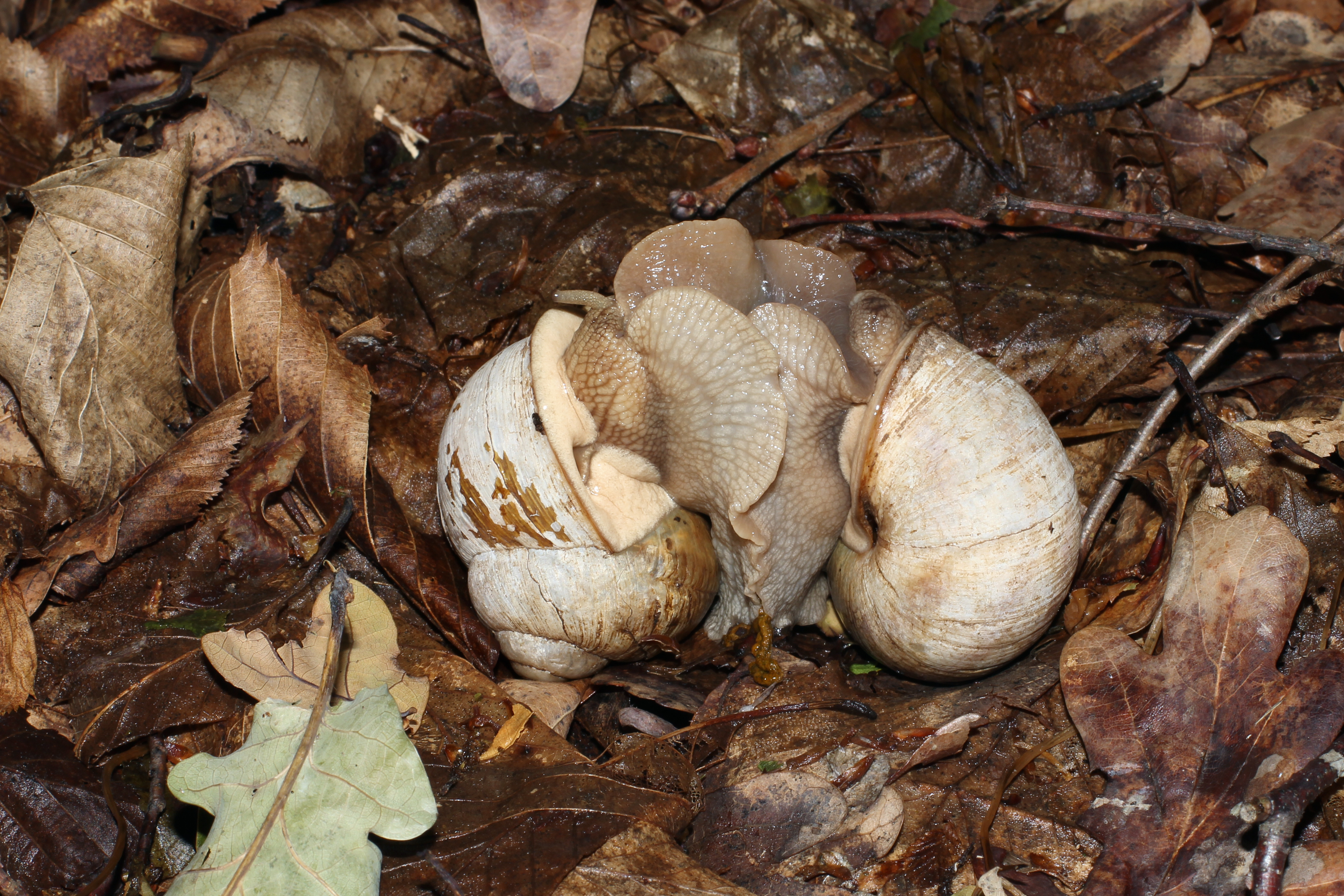
Two Helix pomatia snails mating

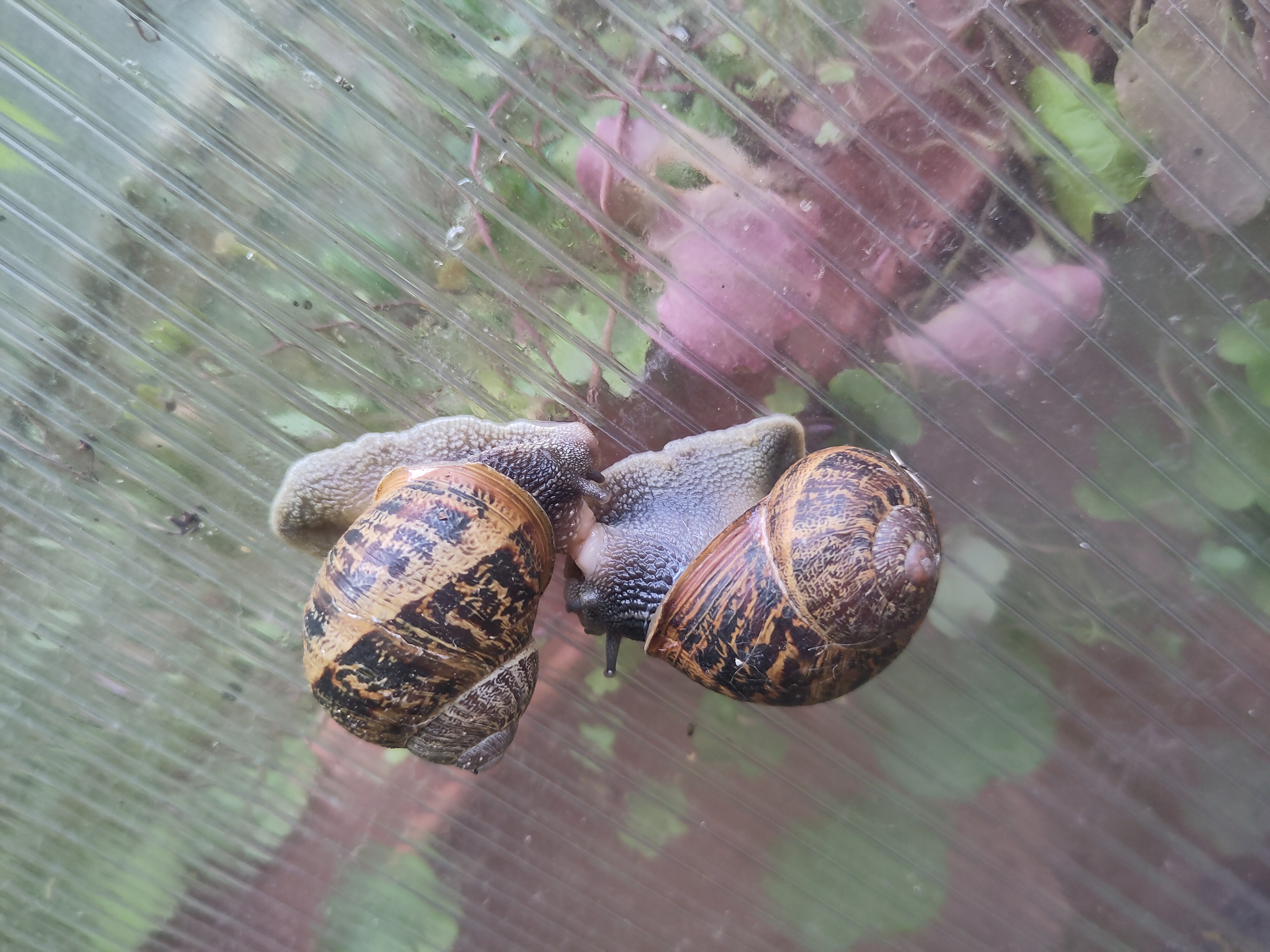
Common Garden Snails mating

The great majority of land snails are hermaphrodites with a full set of reproductive organs of both sexes, able to produce both spermatozoa and ova. A few groups of land snails, such as the Pomatiidae, which are distantly related to periwinkles, have separate sexes: male and female. The age of sexual maturity varies depending on the species of snail, ranging from as little as 6 weeks to 5 years. Adverse environmental conditions may delay sexual maturity in some snail species.

Most pulmonate air-breathing land snails perform courtship behaviors before mating. The courtship may last anywhere between two and twelve hours. In a number of different families of land snails and slugs, prior to mating, one or more love darts are fired into the body of the partner.

Pulmonate land snails are prolific breeders and inseminate each other in pairs to internally fertilize their ova via a reproductive opening on one side of the body, near the front, through which the outer reproductive organs are extruded so that sperm can be exchanged. Fertilization then occurs and the eggs develop. Each brood may consist of up to 100 eggs.

Garden snails bury their eggs in shallow topsoil primarily while the weather is warm and damp, usually 5 to 10 cm down, digging with their foot. Egg sizes differ between species, from a 3 mm diameter in the grove snail to a 6 mm diameter in the Giant African Land Snail. After 2 to 4 weeks of favorable weather, these eggs hatch and the young emerge. Snails may lay eggs as often as once a month.

There have been hybridizations of snail species; although these do not occur commonly in the wild, in captivity, they can be coaxed into doing so.

Parthenogenesis has been reported only in one species of slug, but many species can self-fertilise.

C. obtusus is a prominent endemic snail species of the Eastern Alps. There is strong evidence for selfing (self-fertilization) in the easternmost snail populations as indicated by microsatellite data. Compared to western populations, in the eastern population mucous gland structures employed in sexual reproduction are highly variable and deformed suggesting that in selfing organisms these structures have reduced function.

=== Lifespan ===
Most species of land snail are annual, others are known to live 2 or 3 years, but some of the larger species may live over 10 years in the wild. For instance, 10-year old individuals of the Roman snail Helix pomatia are probably not uncommon in natural populations. Populations of some threatened species may be dependent on a pool of such long-lived adults. In captivity, the lifespan of snails can be much longer than in the wild, for instance up to 25 years in H. pomatia.

=== Diet ===
In the wild, snails eat a variety of different foods. Terrestrial snails are usually herbivorous; however, some species are predatory carnivores or omnivores, including the genus Powelliphanta, which includes the largest carnivorous snails in the world, native to New Zealand. Prominent predatory snail families include the Spiraxidae, Haplotrematidae and Rhytididae. The diet of most land snails can include leaves, stems, soft bark, fruit, vegetables, fungi and algae. They may have a specialized crop of symbiotic bacteria that aid in digestion, especially with the breakdown of the polysaccharide cellulose into simple sugars. Some species can cause damage to agricultural crops and garden plants, and are therefore often regarded as pests.

=== Predators ===
Many predators, both specialist and generalist, feed on snails. Some animals, such as the song thrush, break the shell of the snail by hammering it against a hard object, such as a stone, to expose its edible insides. Other predators, such as some species of frogs, circumvent the need to break snail shells by simply swallowing the snail whole, shell and all.

Some carnivorous species of snails, such as the decollate snail and the rosy wolf snail, also prey on other land snails. Such carnivorous snails are commercially grown and sold to combat pest snail species. Many of these also escape into the wild, where they prey on indigenous snails, such as the Cuban land snails of the genus Polymita, and the indigenous snails of Hawaii.

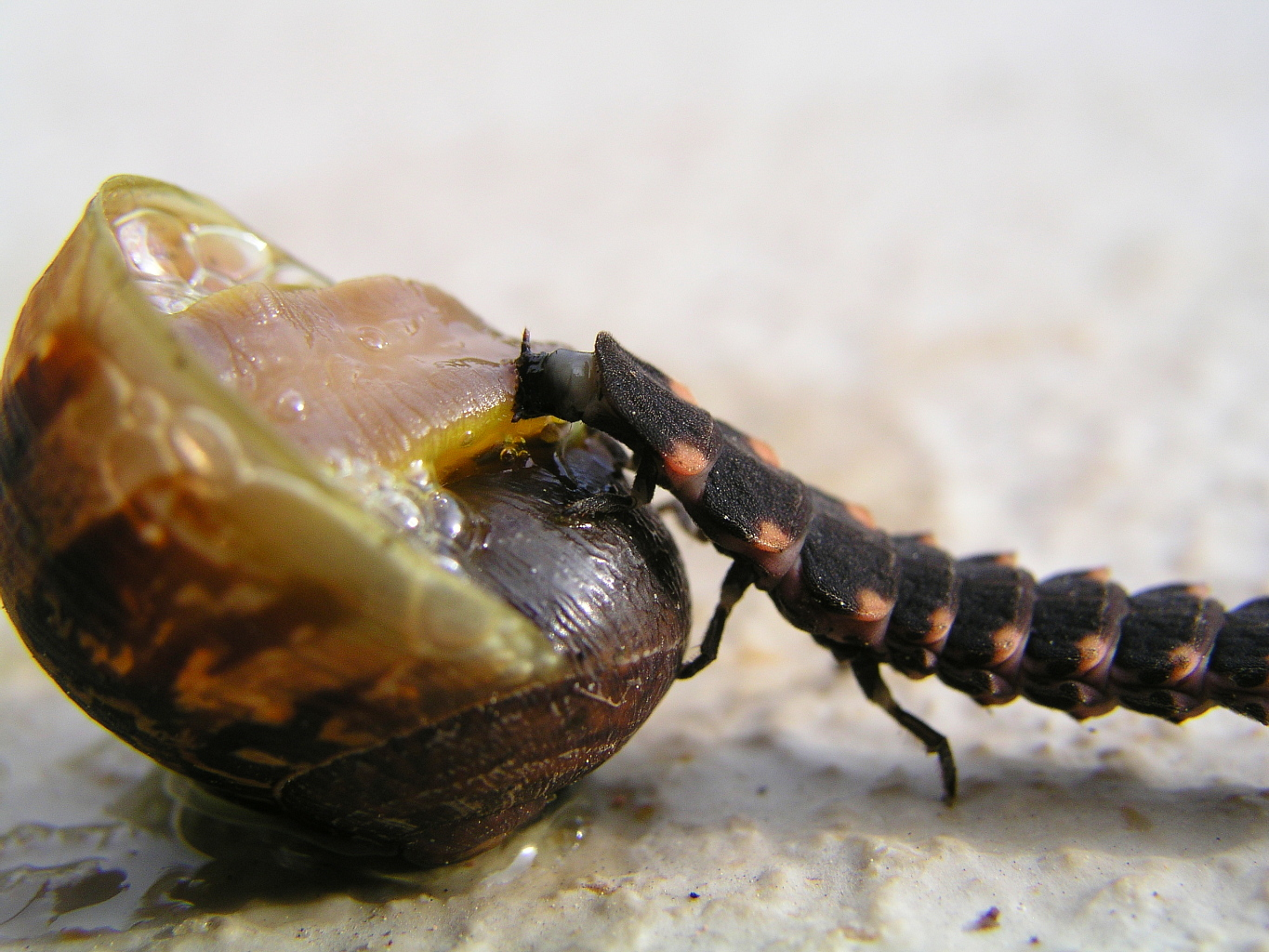
The larva of a glowworm (Lampyris noctiluca) attacking and eating a land snail

In an attempt to protect themselves against predators, land snails retract their soft parts into their shell when they are resting; some bury themselves. Land snails have many natural predators, including members of all the land vertebrate groups, three examples being thrushes, hedgehogs and Pareas snakes. Invertebrate predators include decollate snails, ground beetles, leeches, certain land flatworms such as Platydemus manokwari and even the predatory caterpillar Hyposmocoma molluscivora.

In the case of the marsh snail Succinea putris, the snails can be parasitized by a microscopic flatworm of the species Leucochloridium paradoxum, which then reproduces within the snail's body. The flatworms invade the snail's eye stalks, causing them to become enlarged. Birds are attracted to and consume these eye stalks, consuming the flatworms in the process and becoming the final hosts of the flatworm.

Human activity poses great dangers to snails in the wild. Pollution and habitat destruction have caused the extinction of a considerable number of snail species in recent years.

=== Ecology ===
Snails easily suffer moisture loss. Snails are most active at night and after rainfall. During unfavourable conditions, a snail remains inside its shell, usually under rocks or other hiding places, to avoid being discovered by predators. In dry climates, snails naturally congregate near water sources, including artificial sources such as wastewater outlets of air conditioners.

== Human food ==
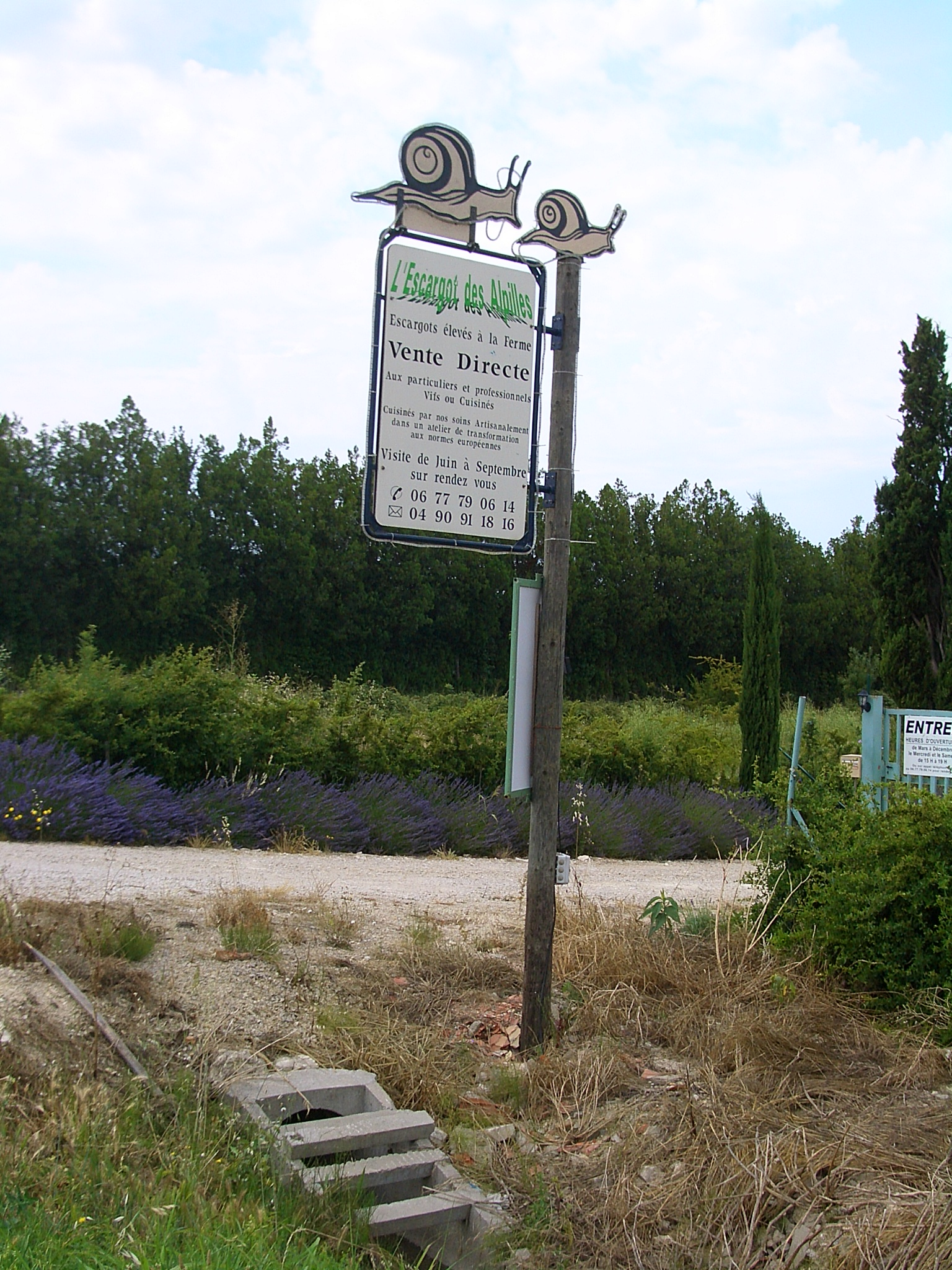
A snail farm in Provence

Land snails have been eaten for thousands of years, going back at least as far as the Pleistocene. Archaeological evidence of snail consumption is especially abundant in Capsian sites in North Africa, but is also found throughout the Mediterranean region in archaeological sites dating between 12,000 and 6,000 years ago. Snail eggs, sold as snail caviar, are a specialty food that is growing in popularity in European cuisine. Snails contain many nutrients. They are rich in calcium and also contain vitamin B_{1} and E. They contain various essential amino acids, and are low in calories and fat. However, wild-caught land snails that are prepared for the table but are not thoroughly cooked can harbor a parasite (Angiostrongylus cantonensis) that can cause a rare kind of meningitis. The process of snail farming is called heliciculture. The establishment of snail farms outside of Europe has introduced several species to North America, South America, and Africa, where some escapees have established themselves as invasive species.

=== Africa ===
In parts of West Africa, specifically Ghana, snails are served as a delicacy. Achatina achatina, Ghana tiger snails, are also known as some of the largest snails in the world. Snail, called "igbin" in Yoruba language is a delicacy, widely eaten in Nigeria, especially among the Yorubas and Igbos. In Igbo language, snails are called "Ejuna" or "Eju". In Cameroon, snails, usually called 'nyamangoro' and 'slow boys' are a delicacy especially to natives of the South West region of Cameroon. The snails are either eaten cooked and spiced or with a favourite dish called 'eru'.

In North Morocco, small snails are eaten as snacks in spicy soup. The recipe is identical to this prepared in Andalusia (South Spain), showing the close cultural relationship between both kinds of cuisine.

=== Europe ===
Snails are eaten in several European countries, as they were in the past in the Roman Empire. Mainly three species, all from the family Helicidae, are ordinarily eaten:

- Helix pomatia, or edible snail, generally prepared in its shell, with parsley butter (size: 40 to 55 mm for an adult weight of 25 to 45 g; typically found in Burgundy, France; known as l'Escargot de Bourgogne).
- Helix lucorum, found throughout the Eastern Mediterranean region are commonly eaten in Greece and in some rural communities (ethnic Greeks and Georgian Catholics) in Georgia.
- Cornu aspersum, synonym Helix aspersa:
  - Cornu aspersum, better known as the European brown snail, is cooked in many different ways, according to different local traditions (size: 28 to 35 mm for an adult weight of 7 to 15 g; typically found in the Mediterranean countries of Europe and North Africa and the French Atlantic coast; Helix aspersa aspersa known as le Petit-gris).
  - Cornu aspersum maxima (size 40 to 45 mm for an average weight of 20 to 30 g; typically found in North Africa).

Snails are a delicacy in French cuisine, where they are called escargots. 191 farms produced escargots in France as of 2014. In an English-language menu, escargot is generally reserved for snails prepared with traditional French recipes (served in the shell with a garlic and parsley butter). Before preparing snails to eat, the snails should be fasting for three days with only water available. After three days of fasting, the snails should be fed flour and offered water for at least a week. This process is thought to cleanse the snails.

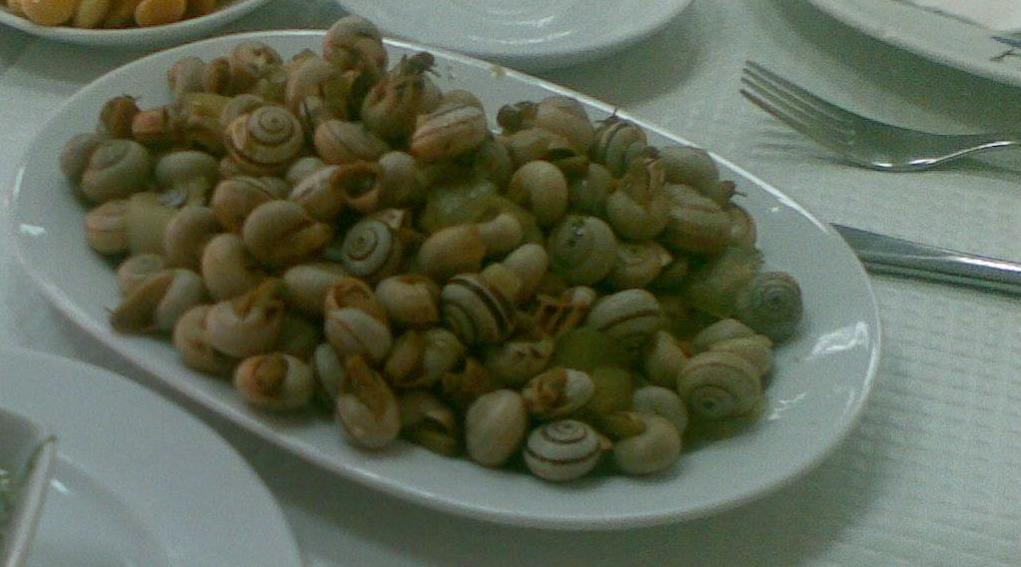
Portuguese caracóis snack, species Theba pisana.

Snails are also popular in Portuguese cuisine where they are called in Portuguese caracóis, and served in cheap snack houses and taverns, usually stewed (with different mixtures of white wine, garlic, piri piri, oregano, coriander or parsley, and sometimes chouriço). Bigger varieties, called caracoletas (especially, Cornu aspersum), are generally grilled and served with a butter sauce, but other dishes also exist such as feijoada de caracóis. Overall, Portugal consumes about 4,000 tonnes of snails each year.

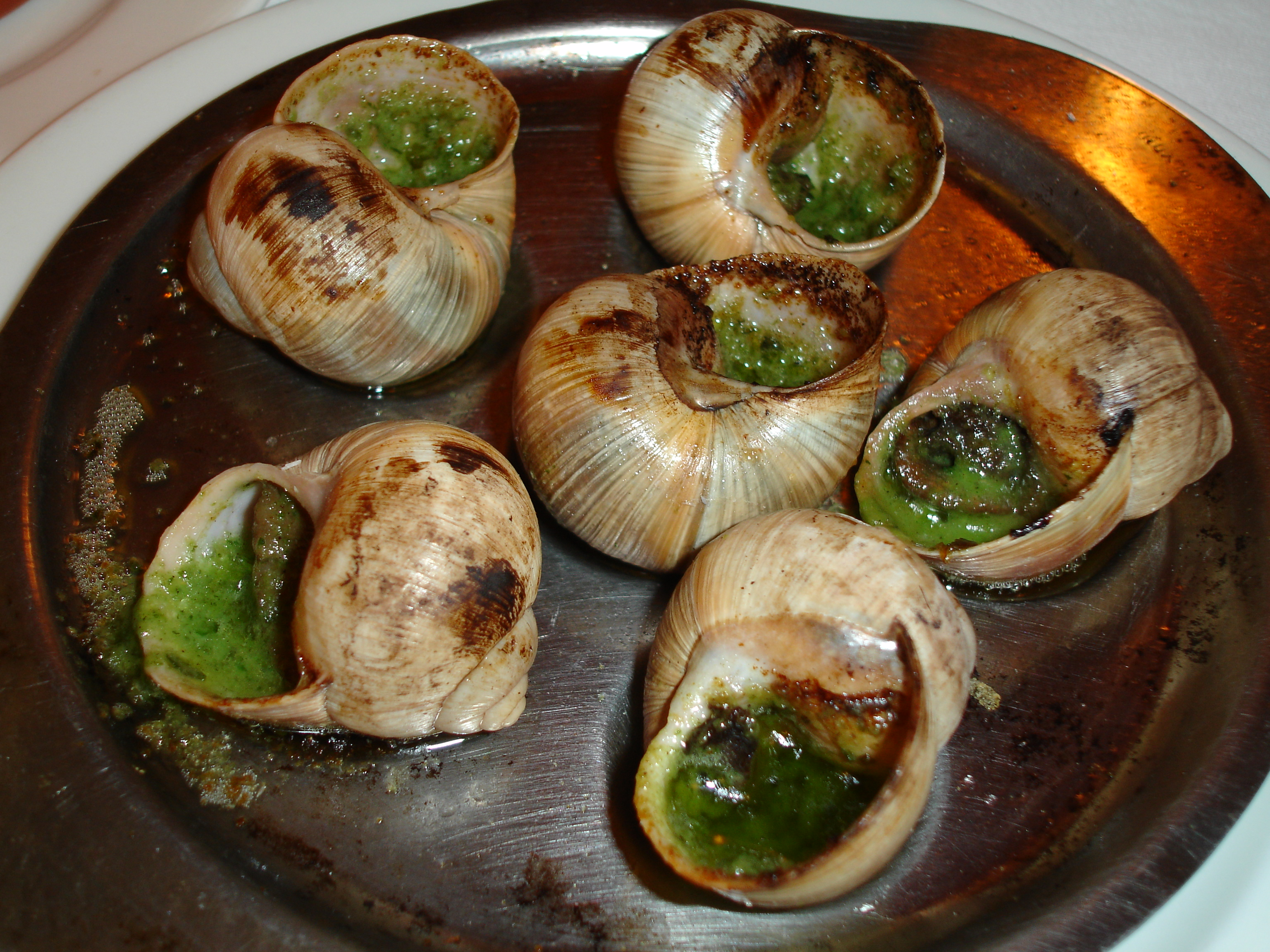
Cooked French escargots, species Helix pomatia

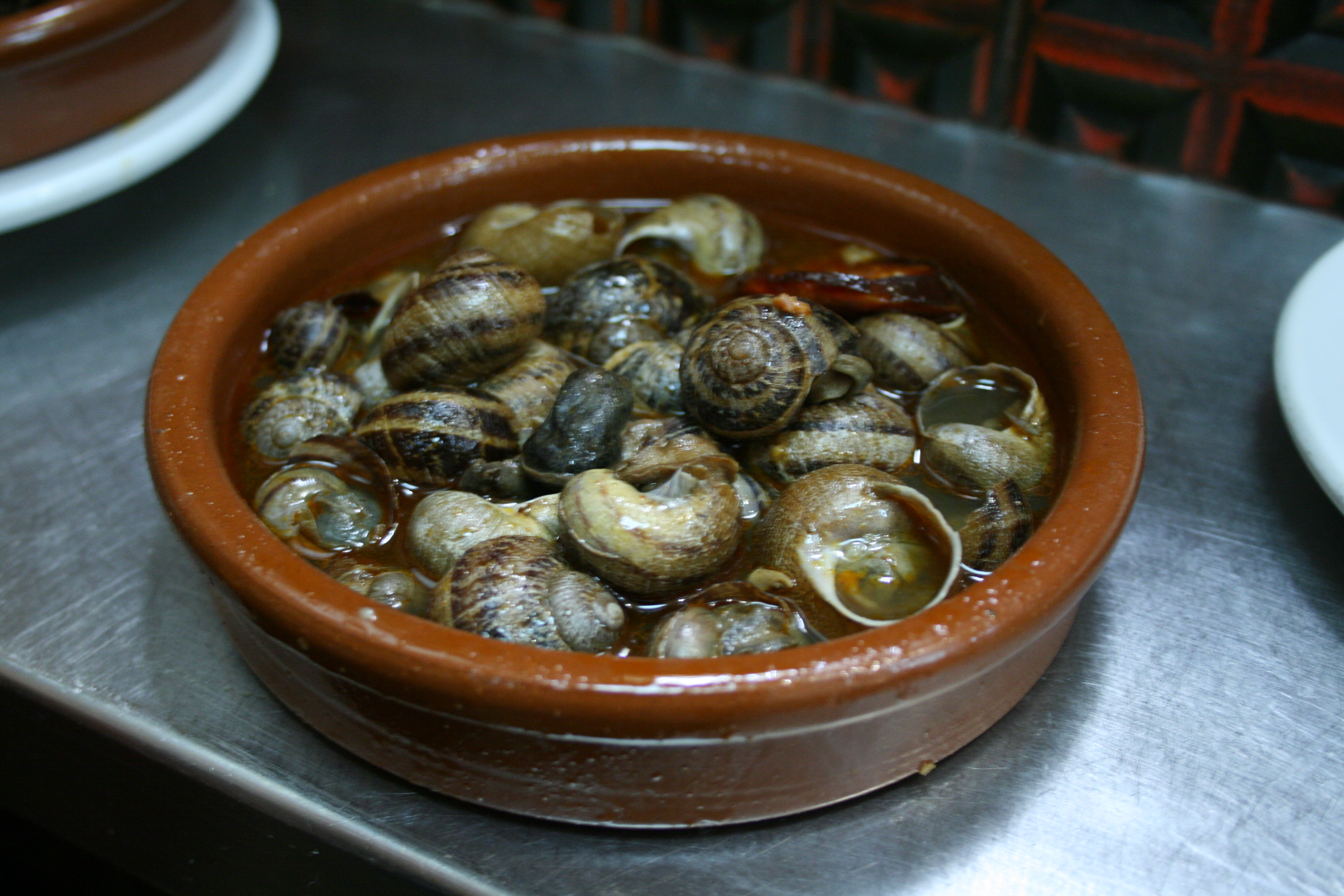
Cooked Spanish "caracoles a la madrileña", species Cornu aspersum

Traditional Spanish cuisine also uses snails ("caracoles" in Spanish; "caragols" or "cargols" in Catalan), consuming several species such as Cornu aspersum, Otala lactea, Otala punctata and Theba pisana. Snails are very popular in Andalusia, Valencia and Catalonia. There are even snail celebrations, such as the "L'Aplec del Caragol", which takes place in Lleida each May and draws more than 200,000 visitors from abroad.

Small to medium-sized varieties are usually cooked in one of several spicy sauces or even in soups, and eaten as an appetizer. The bigger ones may be reserved for more elaborate dishes, such as the "arroz con conejo y caracoles" (a paella-style rice with snails and rabbit meat, from the inner regions of south-eastern Spain), "cabrillas" (snails in spicy tomato sauce, typical of western Andalusia) and the Catalan caragols a la llauna (grilled inside their own shells and then eaten after dipping them in garlic mayonnaise) and a la gormanda (boiled in tomato and onion sauce).

In Greece, snails are popular in the island of Crete, but are also eaten in many parts of the country and can even be found in supermarkets, sometimes placed alive near partly refrigerated vegetables. In this regard, snails are one of the few live organisms sold at supermarkets as food. They are eaten either boiled with vinegar added, or sometimes cooked alive in a casserole with tomato, potatoes and squashes. Limpets and sea snails also find their way to the Greek table around the country. Another snail cooking method is the Kohli Bourbouristi (κοχλιοί μπου(ρ)μπουριστοί), a traditional Cretan dish, which consists of fried snails in olive oil with salt, vinegar and rosemary.

They often feature on Cypriot taverna menus, in the meze section, under the name karaoloi (καράολοι).

In Sicily, snails (or babbaluci as they are commonly called in Sicilian) are a popular dish. They are usually boiled with salt first, then served with tomato sauce or bare with oil, garlic and parsley. Snails are similarly appreciated in other Italian regions, such as Piedmont where in Cherasco there is the Italian National Institute of Heliculture.

Snails (or bebbux as they are called in Maltese) are a dish on the Mediterranean island of Malta, generally prepared and served in the Sicilian manner.

In southwestern Germany there is a regional specialty of soup with snails and herbs, called "Black Forest Snail Chowder" (Badener Schneckensuepple).

Heliciculture is the farming of snails. Some species such as the Roman snail are protected in the wild in several European countries and must not be collected, but the Roman Snail and the Garden Snail (Cornu aspersum) are cultivated on snail farms.

Although there is not usually considered to be a tradition of snail eating in Great Britain, common garden snails Cornu aspersum were eaten in the Southwick area of Sunderland in North East England. They were collected from quarries and along the stone walls of railway embankments during the winter when the snails were hibernating and had voided the contents of their guts. Gibson writes that this tradition was introduced in the 19th century by French immigrant glass workers. "Snail suppers" were a feature of local pubs and Southwick working men were collecting and eating snails as late as the 1970s, though the tradition may now have died out.

=== Oceania ===
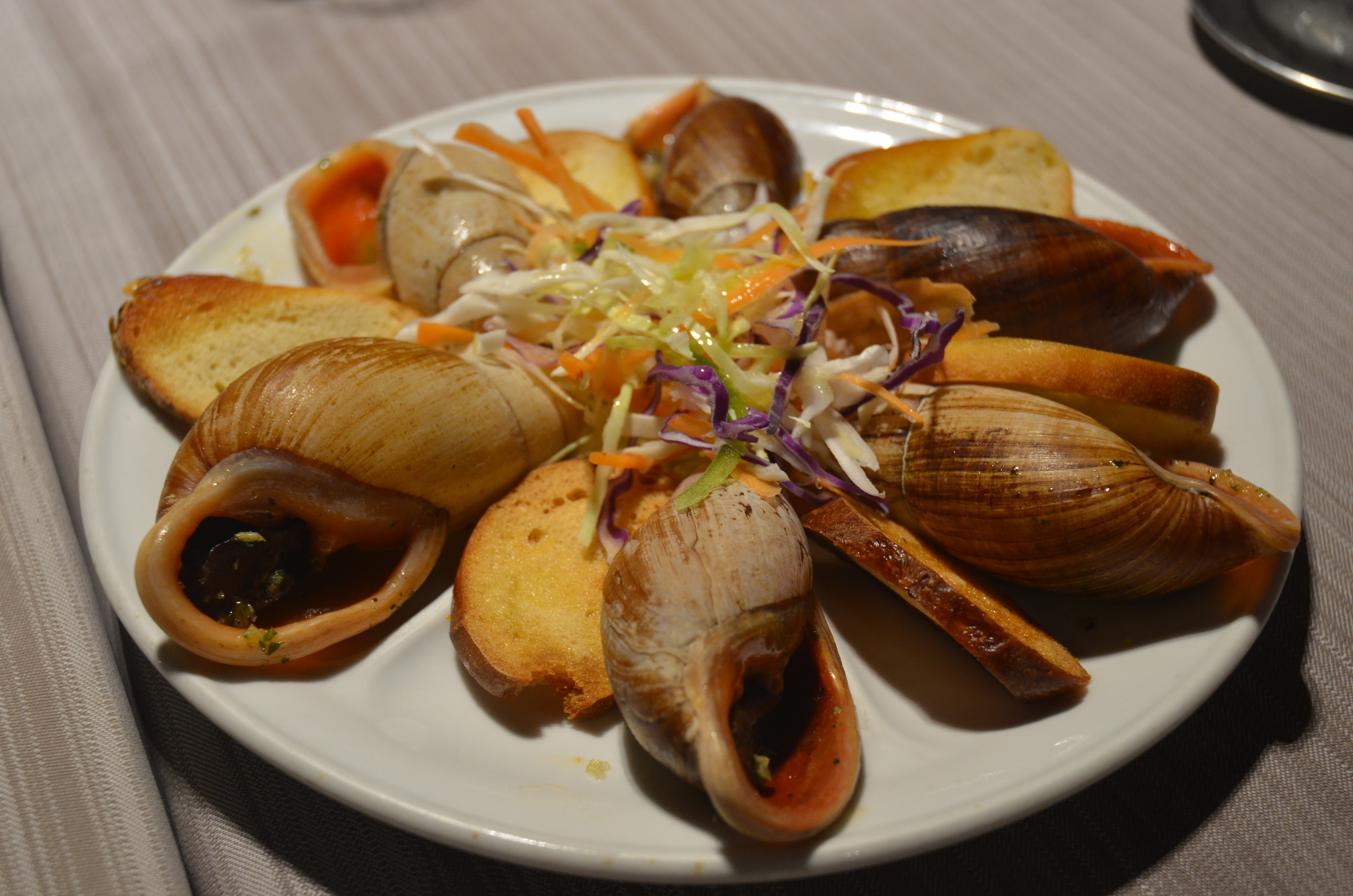
Bulime cooked in garlic butter in Ile des Pins, New Caledonia, species Placostylus fibratus

In New Caledonia, Placostylus fibratus (French: bulime) is considered a highly prized delicacy and is locally farmed to ensure supplies. It is often served by restaurants prepared in the French style with garlic butter.

== Prevention and control ==
Metaldehyde and iron phosphate can be used to exterminate snails. Since copper generates electric shocks that make it difficult for snails to move, it makes a great barrier material for them.

== See also ==
- Cretan cuisine
- Freshwater snail
- Sea slug
- Sea snail
- Slug
- Snail slime
- Terrestrial mollusc
