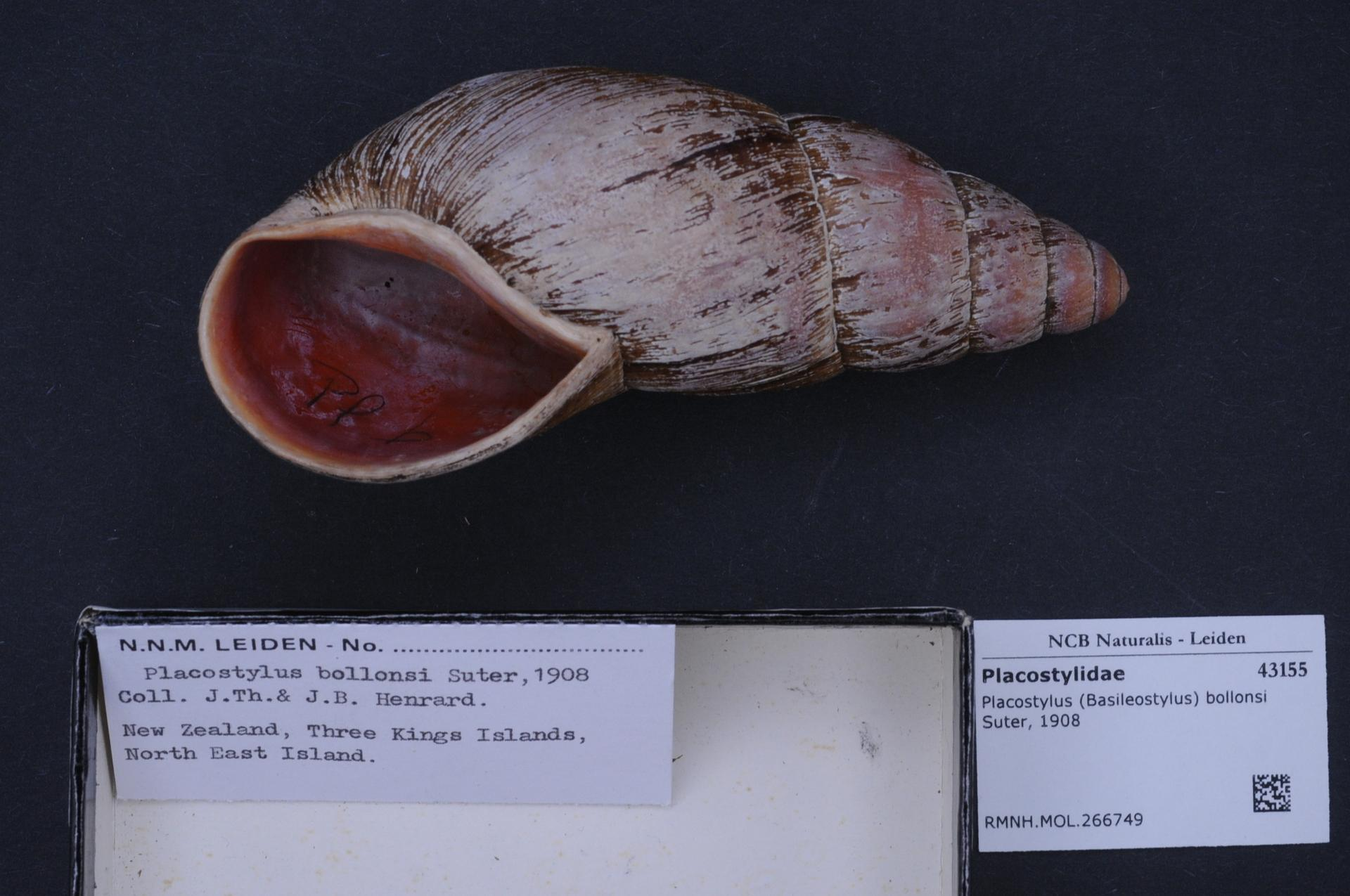

Conservation status
- Vulnerable (IUCN 2.3)

Scientific classification
- Kingdom: Animalia
- Phylum: Mollusca
- Class: Gastropoda
- Order: Stylommatophora
- Family: Bothriembryontidae
- Subfamily: Placostylinae
- Genus: Basileostylus
- Species: B. bollonsi

Binomial name
- Basileostylus bollonsi (Suter, 1908)

Synonyms
- Placostylus (Basileostylus) bollonsi Suter, 1908; Placostylus (Basileostylus) bollonsi arbutus Powell, 1948; Placostylus (Basileostylus) bollonsi caperatus Powell, 1948; Placostylus bollonsi Suter, 1908

= Basileostylus bollonsi =

Species of gastropod

Basileostylus bollonsi, common name the New Zealand flax snail or pupuharakeke, is a species of air-breathing land snail, a terrestrial pulmonate gastropod mollusc in the family Bothriembryontidae.

== Distribution ==
This species is endemic to the Three Kings Islands group off the northern tip of New Zealand's North Island.

== Subspecies ==
A number of subspecies were recognised; Placostylus bollonsi arbutus and P. b. bollonsi are classified by the New Zealand Department of Conservation as being Nationally Endangered, while Placostylus bollonsi caperatus is classified as Nationally Critical.

Buckley et al. (2011) found based on molecular phylogeny research and shell morphology research, that there are no subspecies of Placostylus bollonsi.
