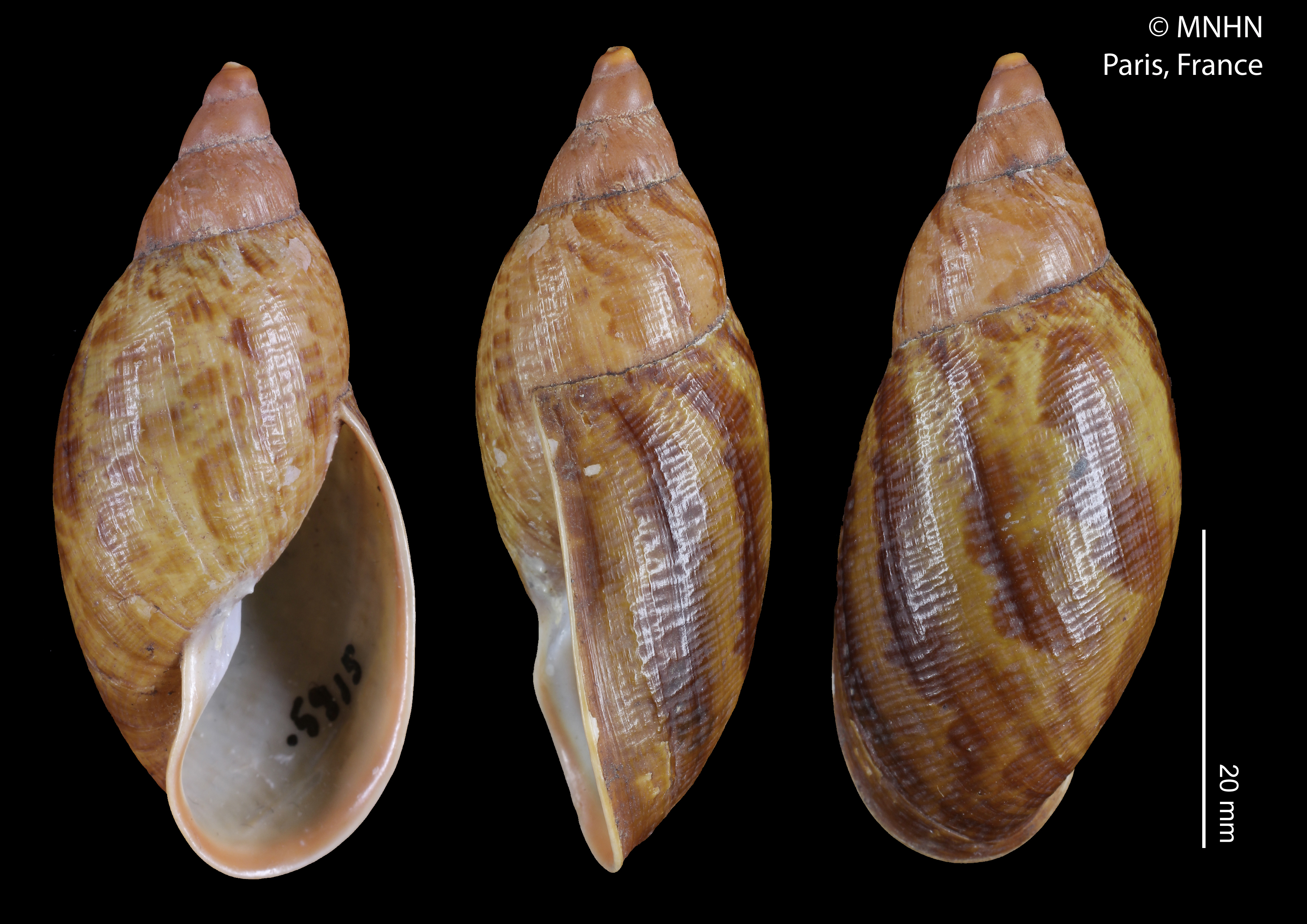
- Shell of Eumecostylus almiranta (specimen at MNHN, Paris)

Scientific classification
- Kingdom: Animalia
- Phylum: Mollusca
- Class: Gastropoda
- Order: Stylommatophora
- Suborder: Helicina
- Superfamily: Orthalicoidea
- Family: Bothriembryontidae
- Genus: Eumecostylus; E. von Martens, 1860

Type species
- Bulimus cleryi Petit de la Saussaye, 1850

Synonyms
- Bulimus (Eumecostylus) Martens, 1860 (original rank); Placostylus (Eumecostylus) Martens, 1860; Placostylus (Proaspastus) Clench, 1941 (junior synonym); Proaspastus Clench, 1941 (junior synonym)

= Eumecostylus =

Genus of gastropods

Eumecostylus, or flax snails, are a genus of very large, air-breathing land snails, terrestrial pulmonate gastropod molluscs in the family Bothriembryontidae.

== Species ==
Species within this genus include:

- Eumecostylus almiranta (Clench, 1941)
- Eumecostylus calus (E. A. Smith, 1892)
- Eumecostylus cleryi (Petit de la Saussaye, 1850)
- Eumecostylus cylindricus (Fulton, 1907)
- Eumecostylus foxi (Clench, 1950)
- Eumecostylus fraterculus (B. Rensch, 1934)
- Eumecostylus gallegoi (Clench, 1941)
- Eumecostylus gardneri Delsaerdt, 2010
- Eumecostylus hargravesi (Cox, 1871)
- Eumecostylus kirakiraensis (B. Rensch, 1934)
- Eumecostylus phenax (Clapp, 1923)
- Eumecostylus sanchristovalensis (Cox, 1870)
- Eumecostylus scottii (Cox, 1873)
- Eumecostylus uliginosus (Kobelt, 1891)
- Eumecostylus unicus (B. Rensch, 1934)
- Eumecostylus vicinus (B. Rensch, 1934)
