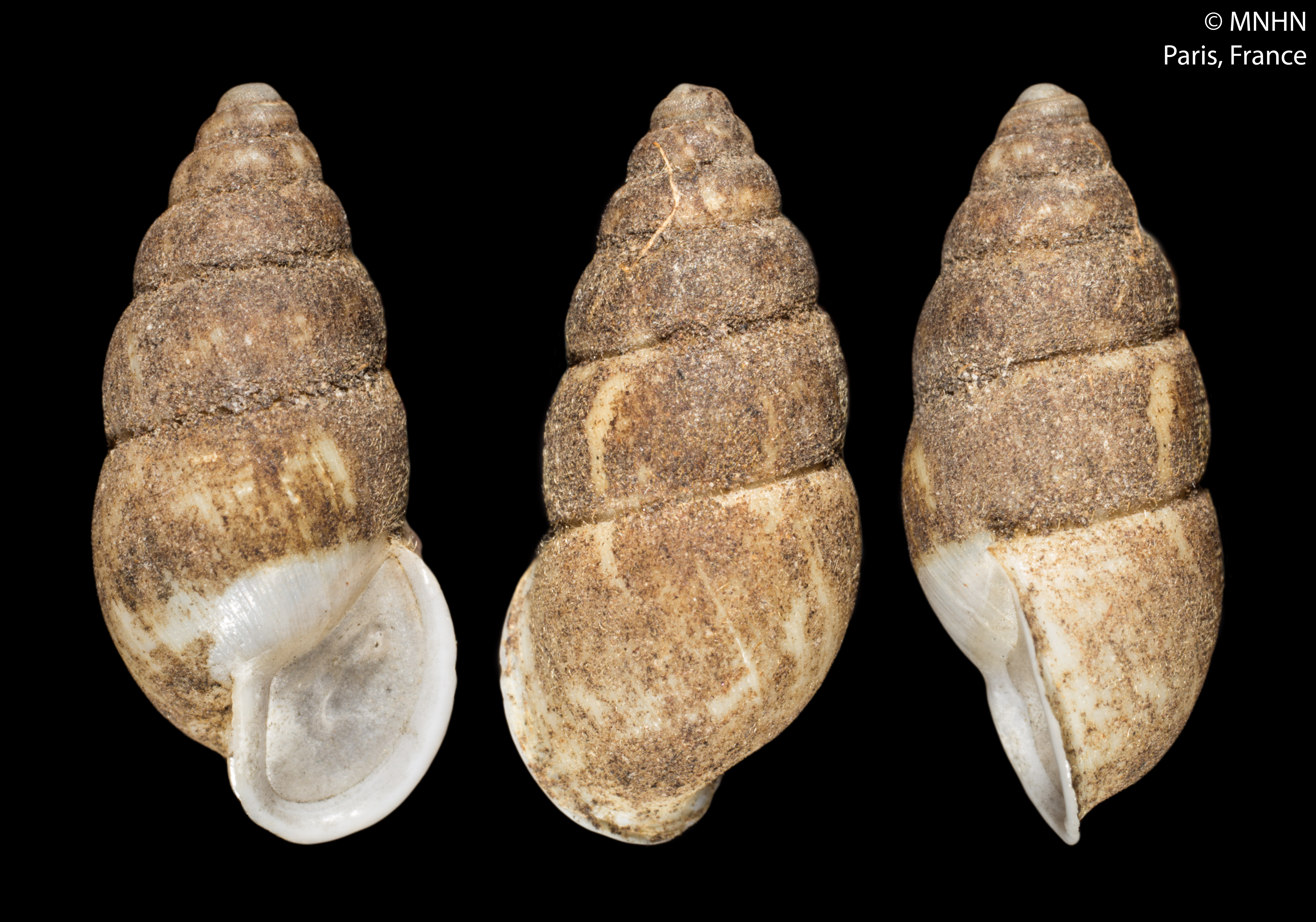
- Shell of Rhinus pubescens (syntype at MNHN, Paris)

Scientific classification
- Domain: Eukaryota
- Kingdom: Animalia
- Phylum: Mollusca
- Class: Gastropoda
- Order: Stylommatophora
- Suborder: Helicina
- Superfamily: Orthalicoidea
- Family: Simpulopsidae
- Genus: Rhinus

Type species
- Helix (Cochlogena) heterotricha S. Moricand, 1836

Synonyms
- Bulimulus (Rhinus) E. von Martens

= Rhinus =

Genus of gastropods

Rhinus is a genus of air-breathing land snails, terrestrial pulmonate gastropod mollusks in the family Simpulopsidae.

== Species ==
Species within the genus Rhinus include:

- Rhinus angosturensis (Gruner, 1841)
- Rhinus argentinus (Ancey, 1901)
- Rhinus botocudus Simone & Salvador, 2016
- Rhinus ciliatus (Gould, 1846)
- Rhinus constrictus (L. Pfeiffer, 1841)
- Rhinus durus (Spix, 1827)
- Rhinus evelinae Leme, 1986
- Rhinus felipponei (Ihering, 1928)
- Rhinus heterotrichus (Moricand, 1836)
- Rhinus koseritzi (Clessin, 1888)
- Rhinus obeliscus F. Haas, 1936
- Rhinus ovulum (Reeve, 1849)
- Rhinus pubescens (Moricand, 1846)
- Rhinus rochai (F. Baker, 1914)
- Rhinus scobinatus (Wood, 1828)
- Rhinus suturalis (F. Baker, 1914)
- Rhinus taipuensis (F. Baker, 1914)
- Rhinus thomei (Weyrauch, 1967)
- Rhinus velutinohispidus (Moricand, 1836)

Species brought into synonymy

- Rhinus heterogrammus (Moricand, 1836): synonym of Protoglyptus heterogramma (S. Moricand, 1836)
- Rhinus longisetus (Moricand, 1846): synonym of Protoglyptus longiseta (S. Moricand, 1846)
