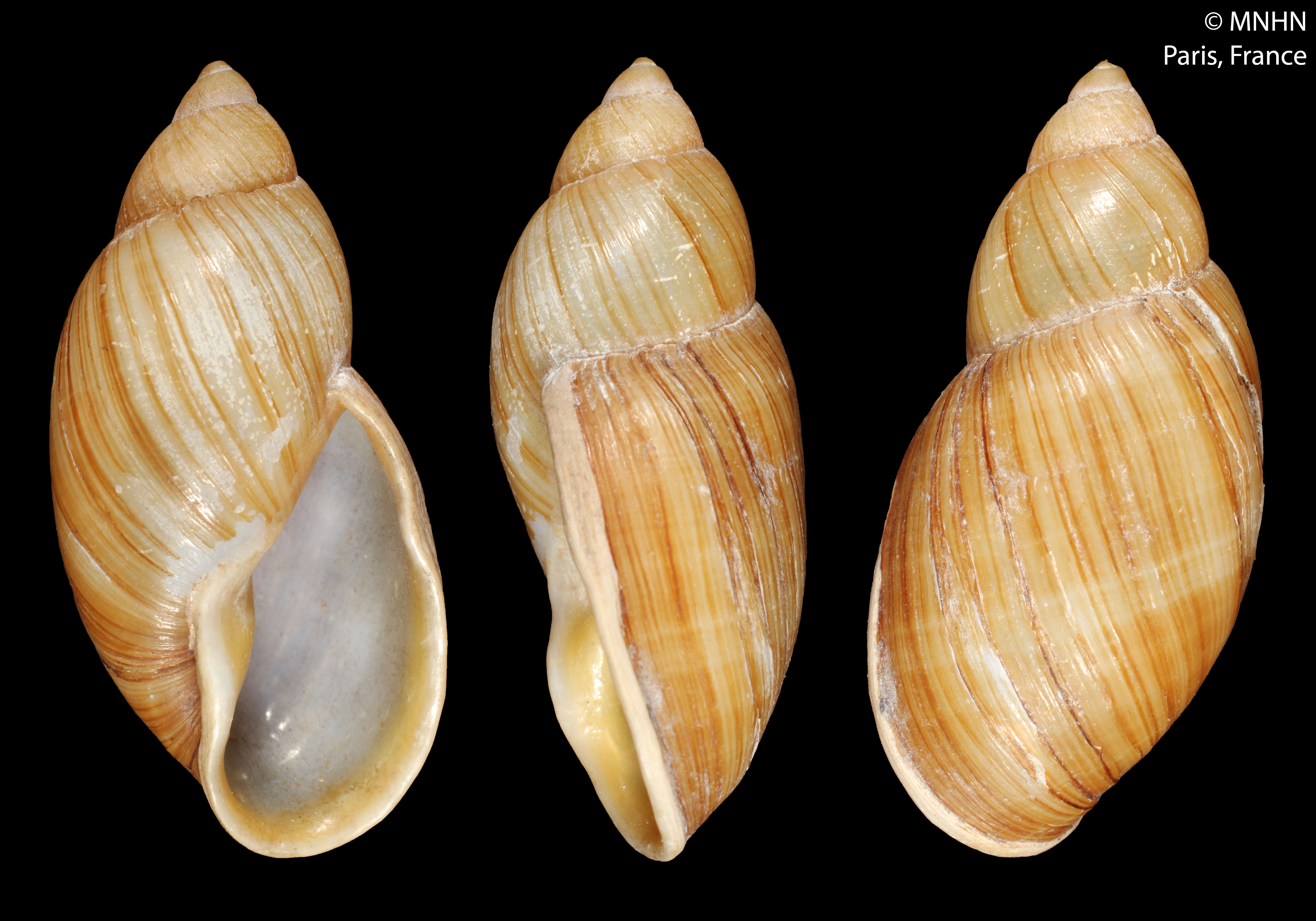
- Shell of Poecilocharis bicolor (paralectotype at MNHN, Paris)

Scientific classification
- Kingdom: Animalia
- Phylum: Mollusca
- Class: Gastropoda
- Order: Stylommatophora
- Suborder: Helicina
- Superfamily: Orthalicoidea
- Family: Bothriembryontidae
- Genus: Poecilocharis; Kobelt, 1891

Synonyms
- Aspastus (Poecilocharis) Kobelt, 1891; Placostylus (Poecilocharis) Kobelt, 1891 (original rank)

= Poecilocharis =

Genus of gastropods

Poecilocharis are a genus of very large, air-breathing land snails, terrestrial pulmonate gastropod molluscs in the family Bothriembryontidae.

== Species ==
- Poecilocharis bicolor (Hartman, 1889)
- Poecilocharis turneri (L. Pfeiffer, 1860)
