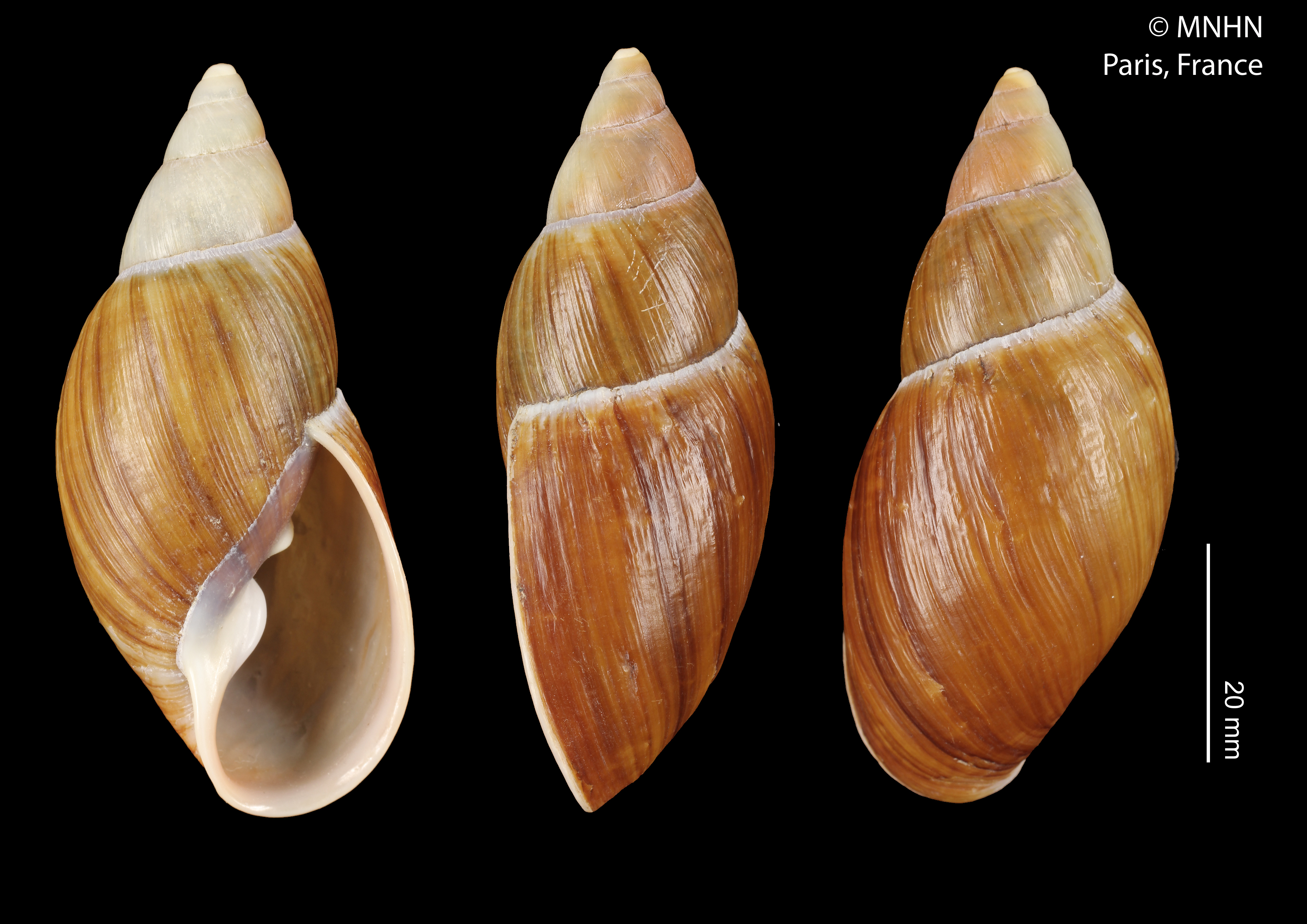
- Shell of Placocharis macgillivrayi (specimen at MNHN, Paris)

Scientific classification
- Kingdom: Animalia
- Phylum: Mollusca
- Class: Gastropoda
- Order: Stylommatophora
- Suborder: Helicina
- Superfamily: Orthalicoidea
- Family: Bothriembryontidae
- Genus: Placocharis; Pilsbry, 1900

Type species
- Bulimus macgillivrayi L. Pfeiffer, 1855

Synonyms
- Acrostylus Clench, 1935 (invalid: junior homonymy of Acrostylus Cossmann, 1896; Malaitella Clench, 1941 is a replacement name); Malaitella Clench, 1941 (junior synonym); Placostylus (Acrostylus) Clench, 1935 (invalid: junior homonym of Acrostylus Cossmann, 1896; Malaitella Clench, 1941 is a replacement name); Placostylus (Malaitella) Clench, 1941 (junior synonym); Placostylus (Placocharis) Pilsbry, 1900 (original rank)

= Placocharis =

Genus of gastropods

Placocharis are a genus of very large, air-breathing land snails, terrestrial pulmonate gastropod molluscs in the subfamily Placostylinae of the family Bothriembryontidae.

== Species ==
- Placocharis acutus Clench, 1935
- Placocharis founaki (Hombron & Jacquinot, 1847)
- Placocharis guppyi (E. A. Smith, 1892)
- Placocharis kreftii (Cox, 1872)
- Placocharis macfarlandi (Brazier, 1876)
- Placocharis macgillivrayi (L. Pfeiffer, 1855)
- Placocharis malaitensis (Clench, 1941)
- Placocharis manni (Clapp, 1923)
- Placocharis ophir (Clench, 1941)
- Placocharis palmarum (Mousson, 1869)
- Placocharis paravicinianus (B. Rensch, 1934)
- Placocharis strangei (L. Pfeiffer, 1855)
- Placocharis stutchburyi (L. Pfeiffer, 1860)
