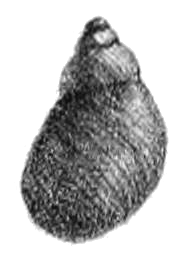
- Drawing of abapertural view of a shell of Prestonella nuptialis

Scientific classification
- Kingdom: Animalia
- Phylum: Mollusca
- Class: Gastropoda
- Order: Stylommatophora
- Family: Bothriembryontidae
- Genus: Prestonella; Connolly, 1929

Diversity
- 3 species

Synonyms
- Prestonellidae van Bruggen, 1978 (n.a.)

= Prestonella =

Genus of gastropods

Prestonella is a genus of air-breathing land snails, terrestrial pulmonate gastropod molluscs in the family Bothriembryontidae.

== Taxonomy ==
Prestonellidae (as a not available name) was tentatively placed as a synonym of Aillyidae in the taxonomy of the Gastropoda by Bouchet & Rocroi, 2005. Prestonella is the type genus of the family Prestonellidae, but Prestonellidae is not an available name, because it has no diagnosis. Prestonella was considered as the only genus in the family Prestonellidae.

Herbert (2007) has classified Prestonella in Bulimulidae sensu lato within Orthalicoidea.

Herbert & Mitchell (2009) have classified Prestonella, for which the phylogenetic relationships were previously unknown, in the superfamily Orthalicoidea.

Breure et al. (2010) moved Prestonella to Placostylidae, that Breure & Romero (2012) renamed to Bothriembryontidae.

Prestonellinae was formally described as a new subfamily within Bothriembryontidae in 2016. Prestonellinae contains three genera: Prestonella Connolly, 1929, Discoleus Breure, 1978 and Plectostylus Beck, 1837. Prestonella is the type genus of the subfamily Prestonellinae.

== Distribution ==
This genus is endemic to South Africa and Lesotho. It occurs in the southern edge of the Great Escarpment in southern Africa.

Prestonella has a relict distribution in the south of the southern Africa and it is the only Recent African member of Bulimulidae s.l. Its distribution is highly fragmented.

== Ecology ==
Prestonella lives in forest and Nama Karoo (semi-desert) biomes. It is very specialized in habitat requirements and it inhabits only two types of relictual habitats: vertical-rocks above running water and moist shaded cliffs facing to the south. Prestonella occurs in the elevation 838–1680 m above sea level. There are two rainfall seasons in the area per year. It has been found in 2011, that genetic diversity in the populations of Prestonella is lower in dryer areas. Global warming would probably have serious negative impact on Prestonella species.

== Species ==
There are three species in the genus Prestonella:

- Prestonella bowkeri (Sowerby, 1889) - type species, synonym: Buliminus bowkeri
- Prestonella nuptialis (Melvill & Ponsonby, 1894)
- Prestonella quadingensis - validity of this species is doubtful. Its habitat details are unknown.
