= Leucocharis =

- Shell of Leucocharis pancheri (holotype at MNHN, Paris)

Scientific classification
- Domain: Eukaryota
- Kingdom: Animalia
- Phylum: Mollusca
- Class: Gastropoda
- Order: Stylommatophora
- Suborder: Helicina
- Superfamily: Orthalicoidea
- Family: Bothriembryontidae
- Genus: Leucocharis; Pilsbry, 1900

Synonyms
- Placostylus (Leuchocharis) (lapsus)

Genus of gastropods

Leucocharis is a genus of air-breathing land snails, terrestrial pulmonate gastropod mollusks in the subfamily Placostylinae of the family Bothriembryontidae.

== Species ==
Species within the genus Leucpcharis include: (extinct species are marked with a dagger †)

- Leucocharis loyaltyensis (Souverbie, 1879)
- Leucocharis pancheri (Crosse, 1870)
- Leucocharis porphyrocheila Dautzenberg & Bernier, 1901
