= Bothriembryon sophiarum =

Scientific classification
- Domain: Eukaryota
- Kingdom: Animalia
- Phylum: Mollusca
- Class: Gastropoda
- Order: Stylommatophora
- Family: Bothriembryontidae
- Genus: Bothriembryon
- Species: B. sophiarum

Binomial name
- Bothriembryon sophiarum Whisson & Breure, 2016

Species of gastropod

Bothriembryon sophiarum is a species of tropical air-breathing land snails, terrestrial pulmonate gastropod mollusc in the family Bothriembryontidae. This species is endemic to Australia.

The anatomy of a reproductive system of this species was visualized by micro–computed tomography scanner (without dissection) and used in a species description of a land snail for the first time.
