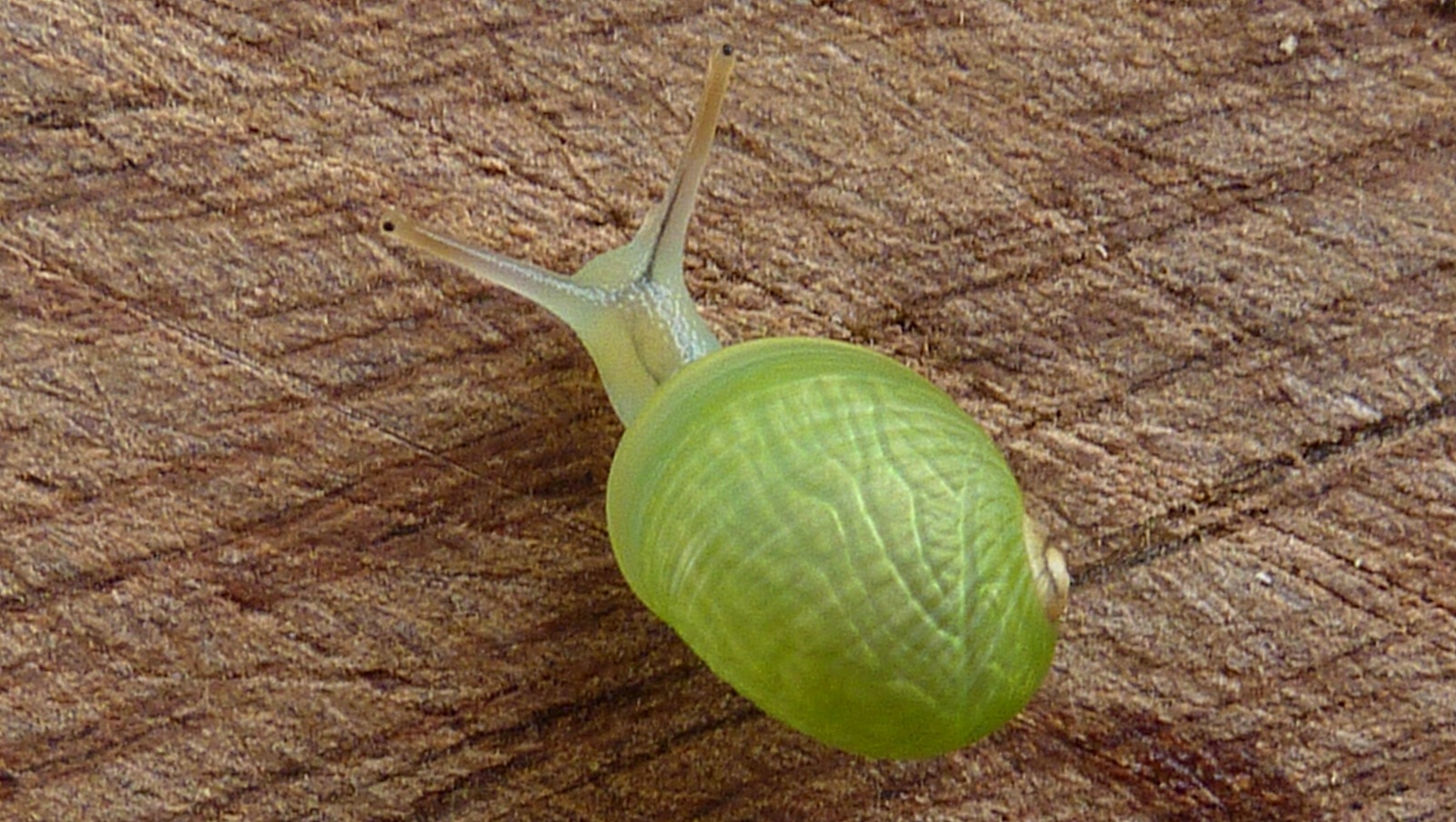
- dorsal view of Simpulopsis rufovirens

Scientific classification
- Kingdom: Animalia
- Phylum: Mollusca
- Class: Gastropoda
- Order: Stylommatophora
- Suborder: Helicina
- Superfamily: Orthalicoidea
- Family: Simpulopsidae
- Genus: Simpulopsis; Beck, 1837

Type species
- Helix (Cochlohydra) sulculosa Férussac, 1821

Synonyms
- Bulimulopsis Pilsbry, 1899; Bulimulus (Eudioptus) E. von Martens, 1860; Bulimus (Eudioptus) von Martens, 1860 (superseded combination); Eudioptus E. von Martens, 1860; Paracochlea Hylton Scott, 1967; Pseudoglandina Weyrauch, 1967; Simpulopsis (Eudioptus) E. von Martens, 1860· accepted, alternate representation; Simpulopsis (Simpulopsis) H. Beck, 1837· accepted, alternate representation; Succinea (Simpulopsis) H. Beck, 1837 (original rank)

= Simpulopsis =

Genus of gastropods

Simpulopsis is a genus of air-breathing land snails, terrestrial pulmonate gastropod mollusks in the family Simpulopsidae.

Simpulopsis is the type genus of the tribe Simpulopsini and of the family Simpulopsidae.

== Distribution ==
The distribution of the genus Simpulopsis includes Colombia, Venezuela, Brazil and Ecuador.

== Species ==
Simpulopsis rufovirens in motion

Species within the genus Simpulopsis include:

subgenus Simpulopsis Beck, 1837

- Simpulopsis atrovirens (Moricand, 1836)
- Simpulopsis brasiliensis (Moricand, 1846)
- Simpulopsis corrugata Guppy, 1866
- Simpulopsis cumingi L. Pfeiffer, 1861
- Simpulopsis decussata Pfeiffer, 1856
- Simpulopsis miersi Pfeiffer, 1856
- Simpulopsis ovata (G.B. Sowerby I, 1822)
- Simpulopsis pseudosulculosa Breure, 1975
- Simpulopsis rufovirens (Moricand, 1846)
- Simpulopsis sulculosa (Férussac, 1821)
- Simpulopsis tryoni Pilsbry, 1899
- Simpulopsis wiebesi Breure, 1975

subgenus Eudioptus Albers, 1860

- Simpulopsis araujoi (Breure, 1975)
- Simpulopsis boissieri (Moricand, 1846)
- Simpulopsis citrinovitrea (Moricand, 1836) - synonym: Simpulopsis fulguratus Miller, 1878
- Simpulopsis ephippium Ancey, 1904
- Simpulopsis luteolus (Ancey, 1901)
- Simpulopsis progastor (d’Orbigny, 1835)
- Simpulopsis pseudosuccinea (Moricand, 1836)

No subgenus mentioned:

- Simpulopsis aenea L. Pfeiffer, 1861
- Simpulopsis dominicensis L. Pfeiffer, 1858
- Simpulopsis eudioptus (Ihering in Pilsbry, 1897)
- Simpulopsis gomesae Silva & Thomé, 2006
- Simpulopsis limpida (Drouët, 1859)
- Simpulopsis magnus Thompson, 1957
- Simpulopsis membranacea Villa & Villa, 1841
- Simpulopsis promatensis Silva & Thomé 2006
- Simpulopsis simula (Morelet, 1851)
- Simpulopsis vincentina E. A. Smith, 1895

Synonyms

- Simpulopsis chiapensis L. Pfeiffer, 1856: synonym of Xanthonyx chiapensis (L. Pfeiffer, 1856) (original combination)
- Simpulopsis cordovana L. Pfeiffer, 1857: synonym of Xanthonyx cordovanus (L. Pfeiffer, 1857) (original combination)
- Simpulopsis mastersi Brazier, 1872: synonym of Mystivagor mastersi (Brazier, 1872) (original combination)
- Simpulopsis portoricensis Shuttleworth, 1854: synonym of Platysuccinea portoricensis (Shuttleworth, 1854) (original combination)
- Simpulopsis salleana L. Pfeiffer, 1857: synonym of Xanthonyx salleanus (L. Pfeiffer, 1857) (original combination)
