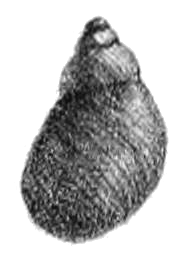
- Drawing of abapertural view of a shell of Prestonella nuptialis from its type description.

Scientific classification
- Kingdom: Animalia
- Phylum: Mollusca
- Class: Gastropoda
- Order: Stylommatophora
- Family: Bothriembryontidae
- Genus: Prestonella
- Species: P. nuptialis

Binomial name
- Prestonella nuptialis (Melvill & Ponsonby, 1894)

Synonyms
- Buliminus nuptialis Melvill & Ponsonby, 1894

= Prestonella nuptialis =

Species of gastropod

Prestonella nuptialis is a species of air-breathing land snail, a terrestrial pulmonate gastropod mollusc in the family Bothriembryontidae.

It was previously classified within Prestonellidae. cf.

== Distribution ==
This species is endemic to Eastern Cape, South Africa.

The type locality is Craigie Burn, Somerset East, South Africa.

== Description ==
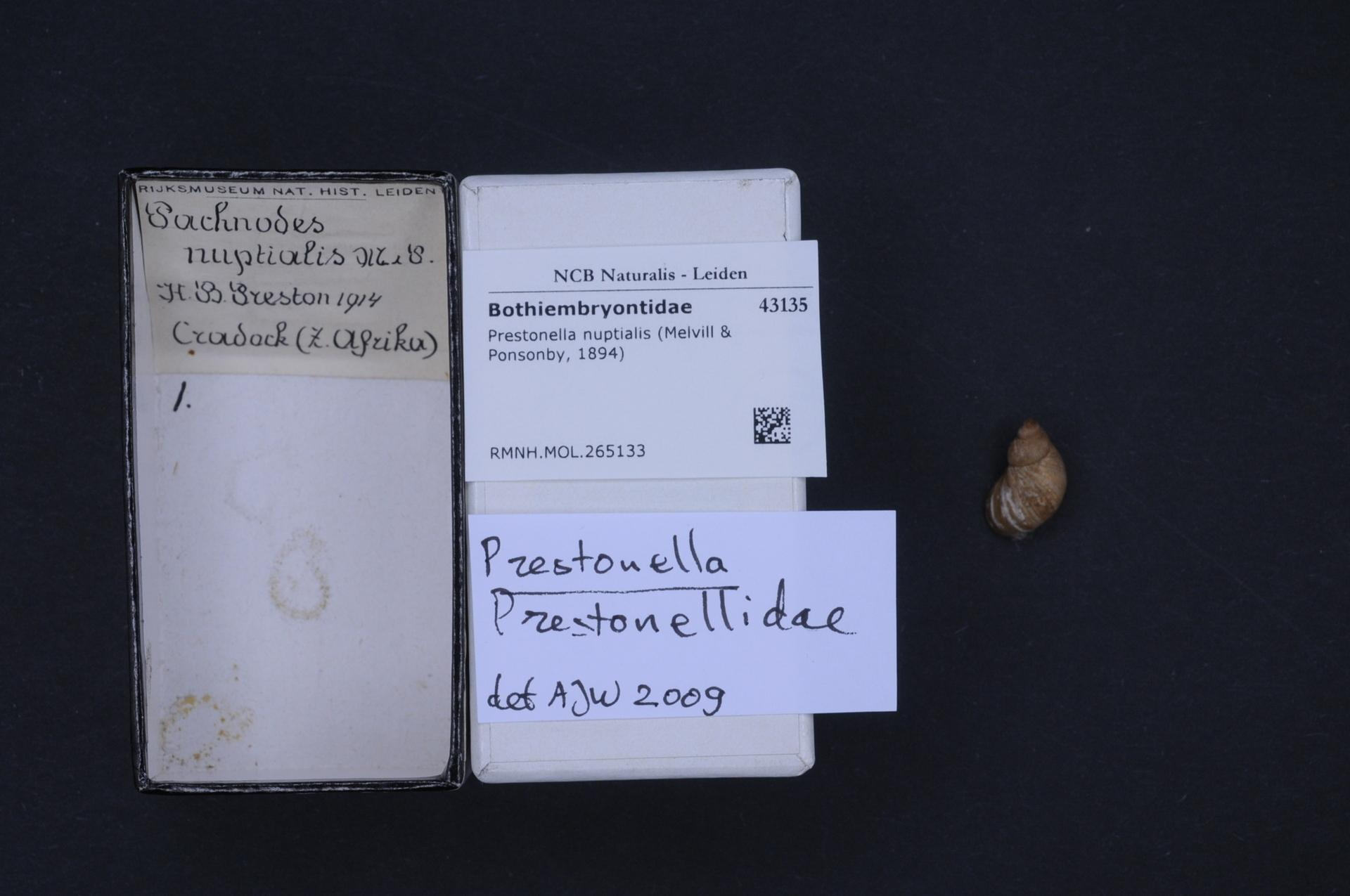
Prestonella nuptialis shell.

Prestonella nuptialis was described by two British malacologists James Cosmo Melvill (1845-1929) and John Henry Ponsonby-Fane (1848-1916) in 1894. The type description reads in Latin and the English language as follows:

Buliminus nuptialis, sp. n. (PI. I. fig. 5.)

B. testa angustissime umbilicata, delicatula, tenui, succineo-brunnea; anfractibus quatuor, tribus supra parvis, ultimo perlato, rapide accrescente, effuso, undique longitudinaliter oblique rude liratis; apertura oblonga; peristomate simplici, tenui, apud umbilicum fere clausum, reflexo. Long. 15, lat. 8·50 mill.

Hab. Craigie Burn, Somerset East (Mrs. Mary Layard Barber). In coll. E. L. Layard.

A small delicate shell, of succinoid character and nearly allied to B. Bowkeri, Sow., but differing in its fewer whorls, broader last whorl, coarser longitudinal liration, and in the

absence of any granular sculpture.

The width of the shell of the type species is 8.5 mm. The height of the shell is 15 mm.
