= Bothriembryon praecelcus =

Conservation status
- Endangered (IUCN 2.3)

Scientific classification
- Kingdom: Animalia
- Phylum: Mollusca
- Class: Gastropoda
- Order: Stylommatophora
- Family: Bothriembryontidae
- Genus: Bothriembryon
- Species: B. praecelcus

Binomial name
- Bothriembryon praecelcus Iredale, 1939

Species of gastropod

Bothriembryon praecelcus is a species of tropical air-breathing land snail, terrestrial pulmonate gastropod mollusks in the family Bothriembryontidae. This species is endemic to Australia.
