= Leucocharis pancheri =

- Shell of Leucocharis pancheri (holotype at MNHN, Paris)

Conservation status
- Critically Endangered (IUCN 2.3)

Scientific classification
- Kingdom: Animalia
- Phylum: Mollusca
- Class: Gastropoda
- Order: Stylommatophora
- Family: Bothriembryontidae
- Genus: Leucocharis
- Species: L. pancheri

Binomial name
- Leucocharis pancheri (Crosse, 1870)

Synonyms
- Leuchocharis pancheri (lapsus); Bulimus pancheri Crosse, 1870 (original combination); Placostylus (Leucocharis) pancheri (Crosse, 1870)

Species of gastropod

Leucocharis pancheri is a species of air-breathing land snail, a terrestrial pulmonate gastropod mollusc in the family Bothriembryontidae.

== Description ==
The length of the shell attains 31.9 mm.

== Distribution ==
This species is endemic to New Caledonia.
