= Bothriembryon spenceri =

Conservation status
- Vulnerable (IUCN 2.3)

Scientific classification
- Kingdom: Animalia
- Phylum: Mollusca
- Class: Gastropoda
- Order: Stylommatophora
- Family: Bothriembryontidae
- Genus: Bothriembryon
- Species: B. spenceri

Binomial name
- Bothriembryon spenceri Tate, 1894

Species of gastropod

Bothriembryon spenceri is a species of tropical air-breathing land snail, terrestrial pulmonate gastropod mollusk in the family Bothriembryontidae, and is endemic to Australia.
