= Bothriembryon perobesus =

Conservation status
- Endangered (IUCN 2.3)

Scientific classification
- Kingdom: Animalia
- Phylum: Mollusca
- Class: Gastropoda
- Order: Stylommatophora
- Family: Bothriembryontidae
- Genus: Bothriembryon
- Species: B. perobesus

Binomial name
- Bothriembryon perobesus Iredale, 1939

Species of gastropod

Bothriembryon perobesus is a species of tropical air-breathing land snail, terrestrial pulmonate gastropod mollusk in the family Bothriembryontidae. This species is endemic to Australia.
