= Basileostylus =

Scientific classification
- Kingdom: Animalia
- Phylum: Mollusca
- Class: Gastropoda
- Order: Stylommatophora
- Superfamily: Orthalicoidea
- Family: Bothriembryontidae
- Subfamily: Placostylinae
- Genus: Basileostylus; F. Haas, 1935

Type species
- Placostylus bollonsi Suter, 1908

Synonyms
- Placostylus (Basileostylus) Haas, 1935

Genus of gastropods

Basileostylus is a genus of very large, air-breathing land snails, terrestrial pulmonate gastropod molluscs in the family Bothriembryontidae.

== Species ==
- Basileostylus bollonsi (Suter, 1908)
