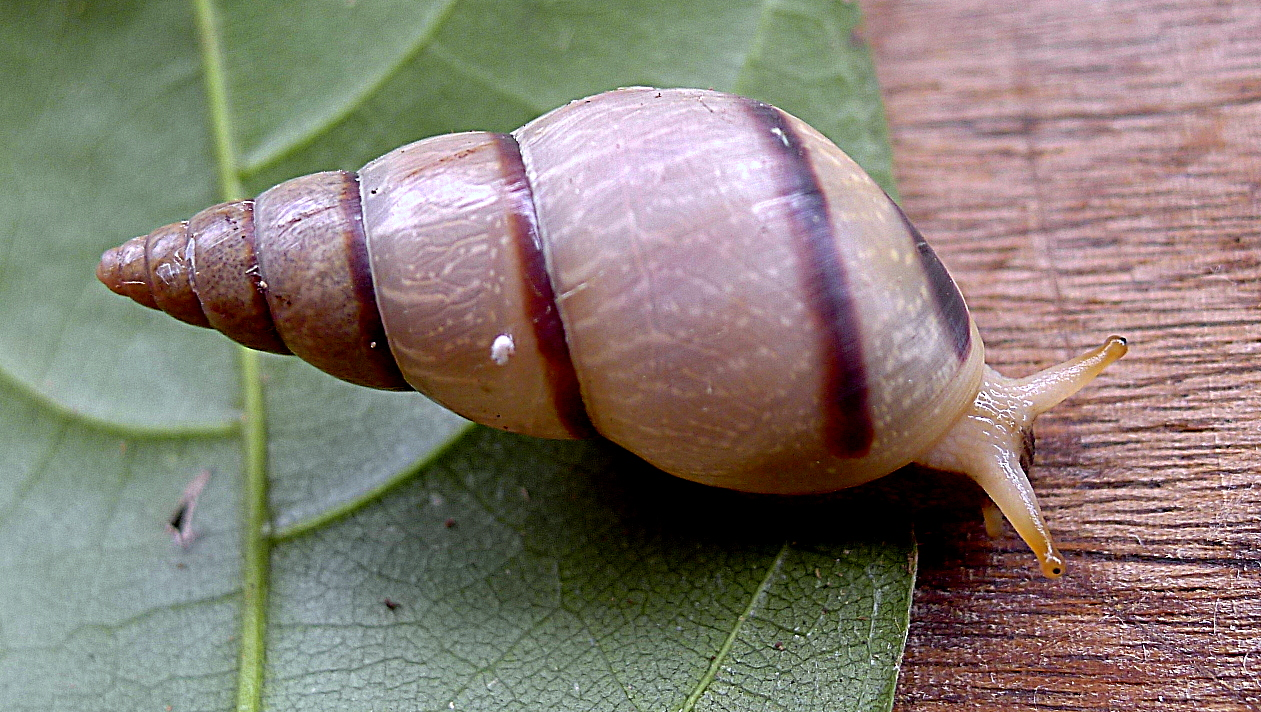
- Leiostracus vittatus from Brazil

Scientific classification
- Kingdom: Animalia
- Phylum: Mollusca
- Class: Gastropoda
- Order: Stylommatophora
- Suborder: Helicina
- Superfamily: Orthalicoidea
- Family: Simpulopsidae
- Genus: Leiostracus; Albers, 1850

Synonyms
- Drymaeus (Leiostracus) Albers, 1850 (unaccepted rank)

= Leiostracus =

Genus of land snails

Leiostracus is a genus of small to medium-sized neotropical, air-breathing land snails, pulmonate gastropod mollusks in family Simpulopsidae.

This genus is endemic to South America, occurring in Guyana, Suriname and Brazil.

== Species ==
Species in the genus Leiostracus include:

- Leiostracus carnavalescus Simone & Salvador, 2016
- Leiostracus cinnamomeolineatus (Moricand, 1841)
- Leiostracus clouei (Pfeiffer, 1856)
- Leiostracus coxiranus (Potiez & Michaud, 1835)
- Leiostracus demerarensis (Pfeiffer, 1861)
- Leiostracus faerie Salvador & Cavallari, 2014
- Leiostracus ferreirai (Palma & Brito, 1974)
- Leiostracus fetidus Salvador & Cavallari, 2014
- Leiostracus goniotropis (Ancey, 1904)
- Leiostracus manoeli (Moricand, 1841)
- Leiostracus melanoscolops (Dohrn, 1882)
- Leiostracus obliquus (Reeve, 1849)
- Leiostracus omphaloides (Menke, 1846)
- Leiostracus onager (Beck, 1837)
- Leiostracus perlucidus (Spix, 1827)
- Leiostracus sarchochilus (Pfeiffer, 1837)
- Leiostracus subtuszonatus (Pilsbry, 1899)
- Leiostracus vimineus (Moricand, 1833)
- Leiostracus vitreus (Spix, 1827)
- Leiostracus vittatus (Spix, 1827)
- Leiostracus webberi Pilsbry, 1939

Species brought into synonymy

- Leiostracus coxeiranus (Moricand, 1836): synonym of Leiostracus coxiranus (Potiez & Michaud, 1835) (junior synonym)
- Leiostracus kugleri Forcart, 1954: synonym of Bostryx kugleri (Forcart, 1954) (original combination)
- Leiostracus polygrammus (Moricand, 1836): synonym of Drymaeus polygramma (S. Moricand, 1836)
- Leiostracus studeri (L. Pfeiffer, 1847): synonym of Drymaeus studeri (L. Pfeiffer, 1847)
