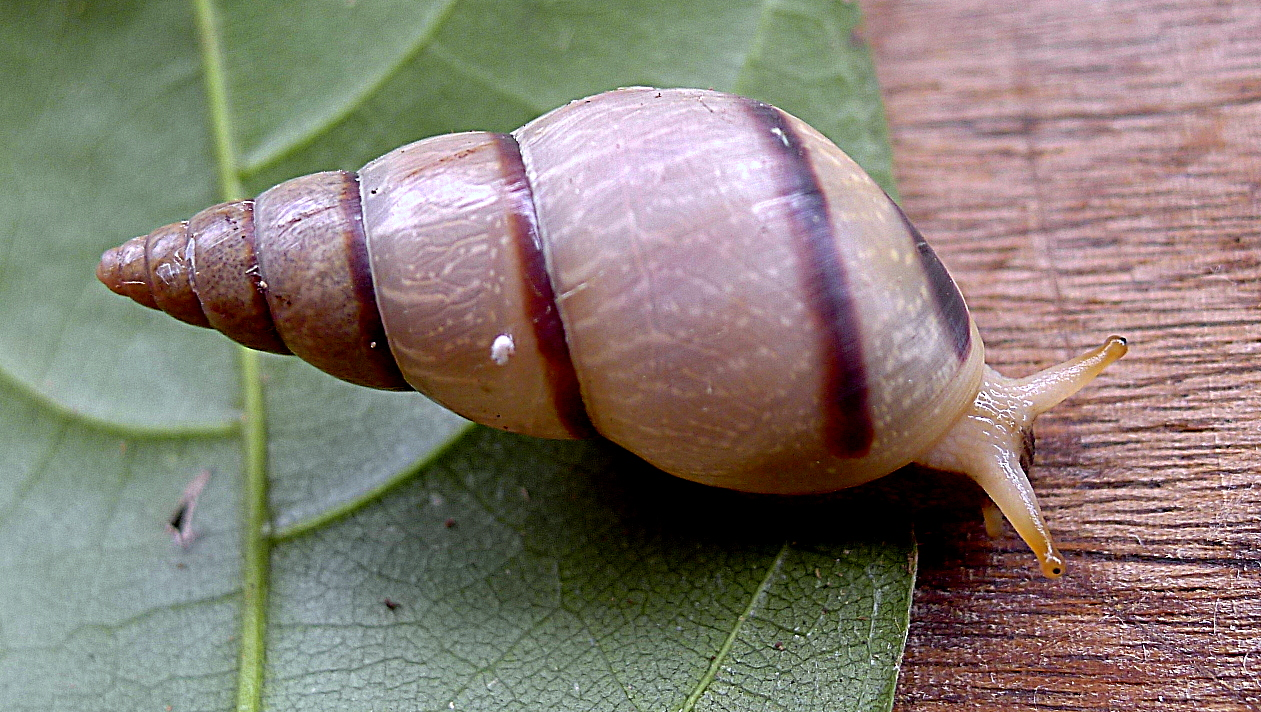
- A living specimen of L. vittatus from Bahia, Brazil

Scientific classification
- Domain: Eukaryota
- Kingdom: Animalia
- Phylum: Mollusca
- Class: Gastropoda
- Order: Stylommatophora
- Family: Simpulopsidae
- Genus: Leiostracus
- Species: L. vittatus

Binomial name
- Leiostracus vittatus (Spix, 1827)

= Leiostracus vittatus =

Species of gastropod

Leiostracus vittatus is a species of tropical air-breathing land snail, a terrestrial pulmonate gastropod mollusc in the family Simpulopsidae.
