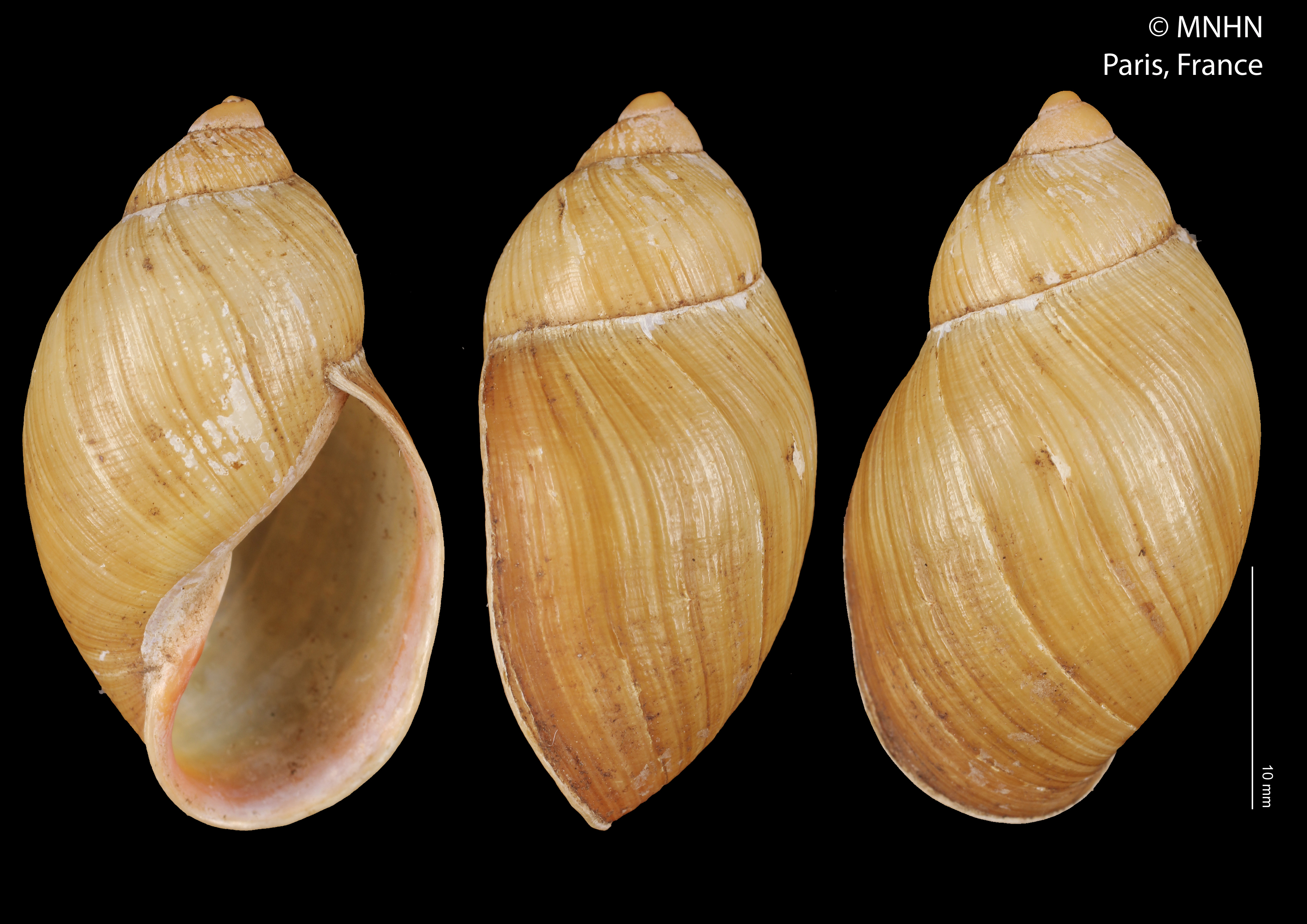
- Shell of Santacharis hullianus (specimen at MNHN, Paris)

Scientific classification
- Kingdom: Animalia
- Phylum: Mollusca
- Class: Gastropoda
- Order: Stylommatophora
- Suborder: Helicina
- Superfamily: Orthalicoidea
- Family: Bothriembryontidae
- Genus: Santacharis; Iredale, 1927

Type species
- Santacharis hullianus Iredale, 1927

Synonyms
- Placostylus (Santacharis) Iredale, 1927

= Santacharis =

Genus of gastropods

Santacharis are a genus of very large, air-breathing land snails, terrestrial pulmonate gastropod molluscs in the family Bothriembryontidae.

== Species ==
- Santacharis fuligineus (L. Pfeiffer, 1854)
- Santacharis hullianus Iredale, 1927
- Santacharis salomonis (L. Pfeiffer, 1852)
