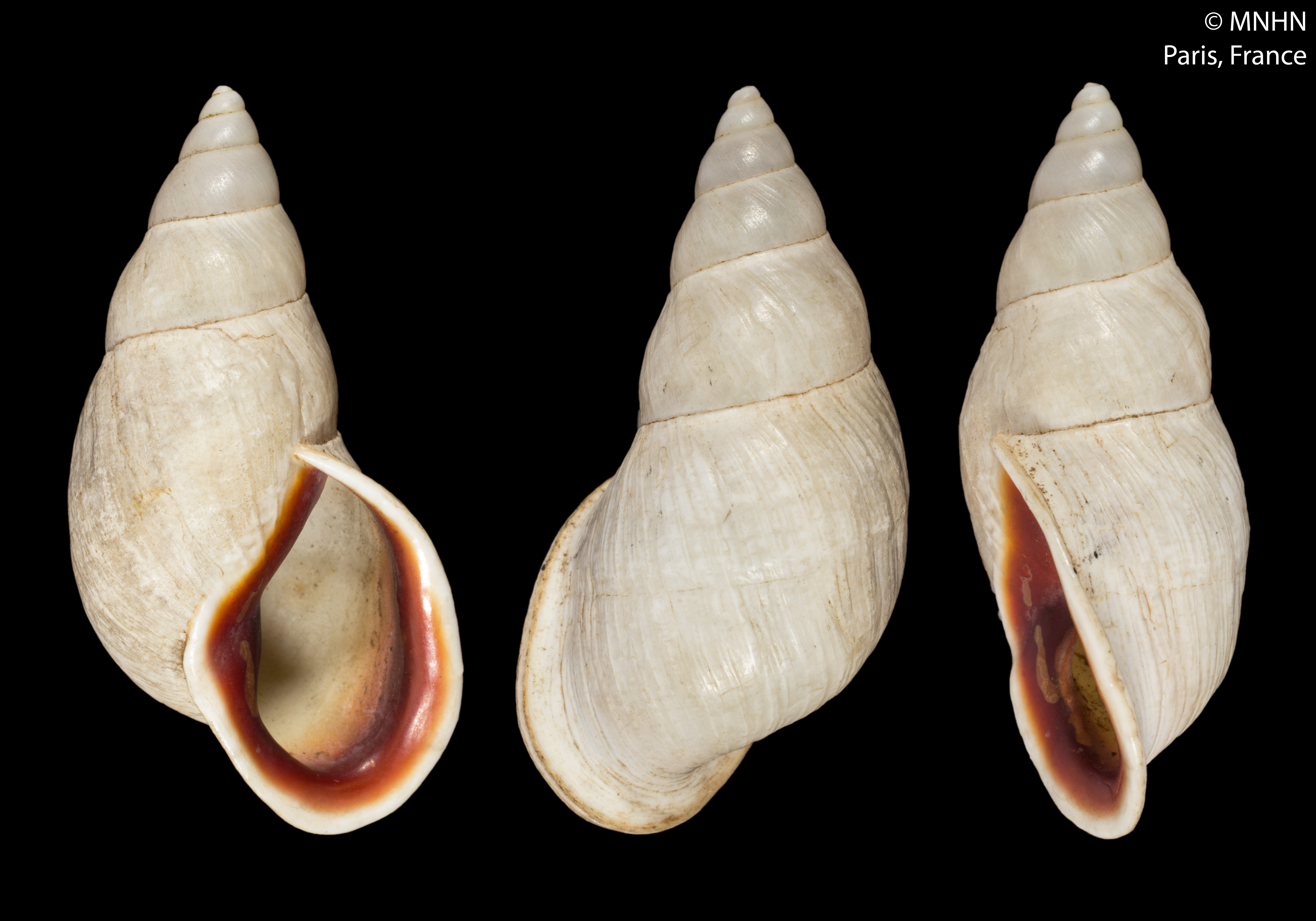
- Shell of Leucocharis porphyrochila (syntype at MNHN, Paris)

Conservation status
- Extinct (IUCN 2.3)

Scientific classification
- Kingdom: Animalia
- Phylum: Mollusca
- Class: Gastropoda
- Order: Stylommatophora
- Family: Bothriembryontidae
- Genus: Leucocharis
- Species: †L. porphyrocheila

Binomial name
- †Leucocharis porphyrocheila Dautzenberg & Bernier, 1901

Synonyms
- Leucocharis porphyrochila var. rubicunda Dautzenberg, 1902; Placostylus (Leucocharis) porphyrochila (Dautzenberg & Bernier, 1901)

= Leucocharis porphyrocheila =

Species of gastropod

Leucocharis porphyrocheila was a species of air-breathing land snails, terrestrial pulmonate gastropod mollusks in the family Bothriembryontidae.

== Description ==
The length of the shell attains 42.2 mm.

== Distribution ==
This marine species was endemic to New Caledonia.
