= Leucocharis loyaltyensis =

Conservation status
- Extinct (IUCN 2.3)

Scientific classification
- Kingdom: Animalia
- Phylum: Mollusca
- Class: Gastropoda
- Order: Stylommatophora
- Family: Bothriembryontidae
- Genus: Leucocharis
- Species: †L. loyaltyensis

Binomial name
- †Leucocharis loyaltyensis (Souverbie, 1879)

Synonyms
- Bulimus loyaltyensis Souverbie, 1879 (original combination); Leucocharis loyaltyensis var. lactea Dautzenberg, 1923; Leucocharis loyaltyensis var. luteomarginata Dautzenberg, 1923; Leucocharis loyaltyensis var. subaurantiacofulvida Dautzenberg, 1923; Placostylus (Leucocharis) loyaltyensis (Souverbie, 1879); Placostylus loyaltyensis (Souverbie, 1879)

Species of gastropod

Leucocharis loyaltyensis was a species of air-breathing land snail, a terrestrial pulmonate gastropod mollusc in the family Bothriembryontidae.

== Distribution ==
This species was endemic to New Caledonia.
