= Leiostracus demerarensis =

Scientific classification
- Kingdom: Animalia
- Phylum: Mollusca
- Class: Gastropoda
- Order: Stylommatophora
- Family: Simpulopsidae
- Genus: Leiostracus
- Species: L. demerarensis

Binomial name
- Leiostracus demerarensis (L. Pfeiffer, 1861)

Synonyms
- Leiostracus ruthveni H.B. Baker, 1926: Bostryx demerarensis (L. Pfeiffer, 1861) (superseded combination); Bulimus demerarensis L. Pfeiffer, 1861 (original combination); Drymaeus (Leiostracus) ruthveni H. B. Baker, 1926 (junior synonym)

Species of gastropod

Leiostracus demerarensis is a species of tropical air-breathing land snail, a terrestrial pulmonate gastropod mollusc in the family Simpulopsidae.

== Distribution ==
This species is endemic to South America and is so far known to occur in Guyana, Suriname, French Guiana, and northern Brazil.
