= Leiostracus fetidus =

Scientific classification
- Kingdom: Animalia
- Phylum: Mollusca
- Class: Gastropoda
- Order: Stylommatophora
- Family: Simpulopsidae
- Genus: Leiostracus
- Species: L. fetidus

Binomial name
- Leiostracus fetidus Salvador & Cavallari, 2014

Species of gastropod

Leiostracus fetidus is a species of tropical air-breathing land snail, a terrestrial pulmonate gastropod mollusc in the family Simpulopsidae.

This species is endemic to Brazil.
