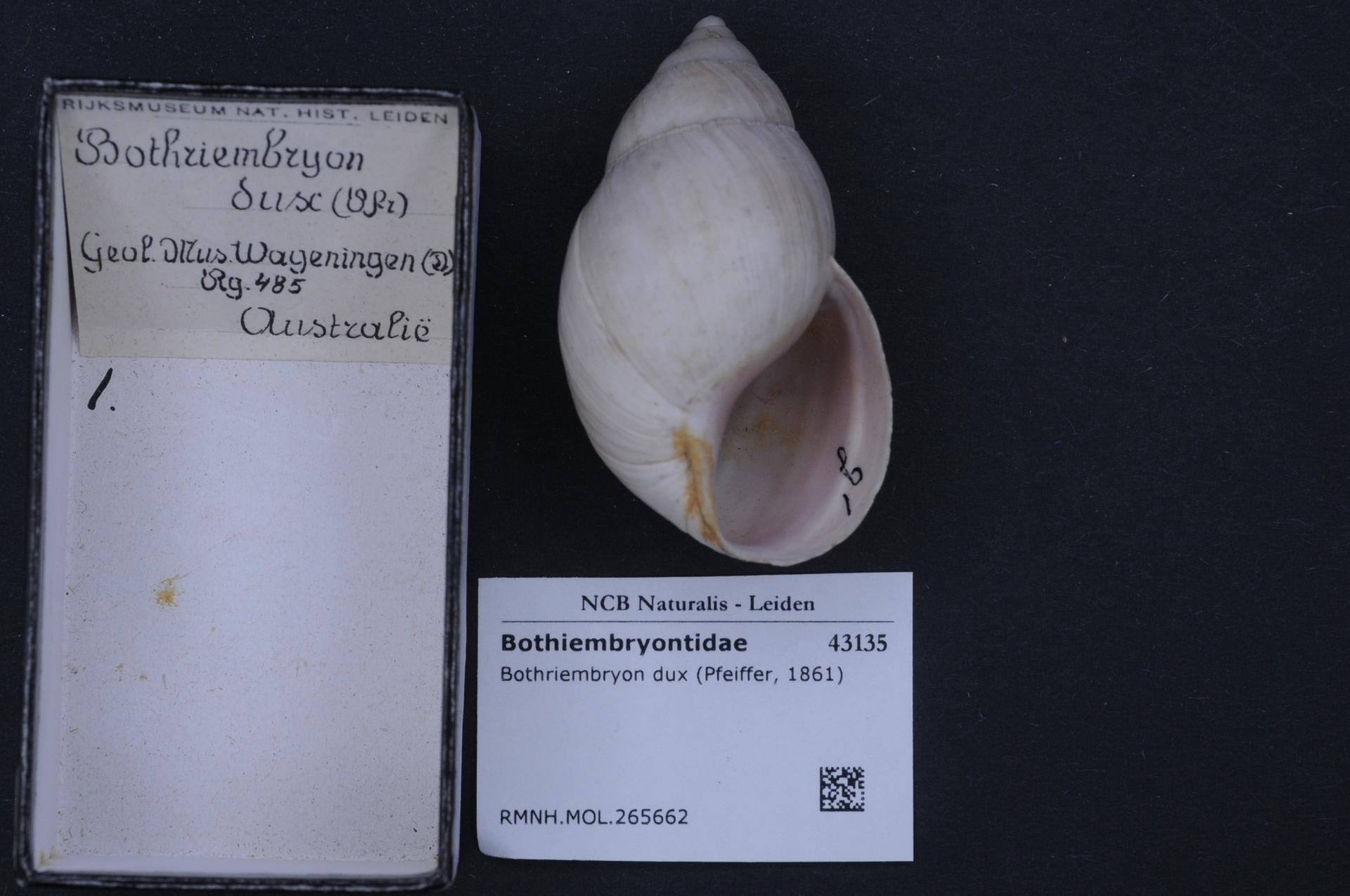
- Bothriembryon dux shell

Scientific classification
- Kingdom: Animalia
- Phylum: Mollusca
- Class: Gastropoda
- Order: Stylommatophora
- Superfamily: Orthalicoidea
- Family: Bothriembryontidae
- Subfamily: Bothriembryontinae
- Genus: Bothriembryon; Pilsbry, 1894

Diversity
- 43 species, 36 extant species, 7 fossil species

Synonyms
- Bothriembryon (Bothriembryon) Pilsbry, 1894; Bothriembryon (Tasmanembryon) Breure, 1979; Bulimus (Liparus) Albers, 1850; Celatembryon Iredale, 1939; Hartogembryon Iredale, 1933; Larapintembryon Iredale, 1933; Liparus Albers, 1850 (invalid: junior homonym of Liparus Olivier, 1807 [Coleoptera]; Bothriembryon is a replacement name); Satagembryon Iredale, 1933

= Bothriembryon =

Genus of gastropods

Bothriembryon is a genus of tropical air-breathing land snails, terrestrial pulmonate gastropod mollusks in the family Bothriembryontidae.

B. J. Smith (1992) made the last review of the genus summarizing all known data.

== Distribution ==
The land snail genus Bothriembryon is endemic to Australia but forms part of the Gondwanan element in the superfamily Orthalicoidea. Bothriembryon species are mostly patchy in their distribution.

Fossils of Bothriembryon have been found on the Nullarbor Plain in southern Australia, dating to the late Pliocene.

== Taxonomy ==
This genus was classified with the Bulimulidae by Pilsbry (1900), Breure (1979) and by B. J. Smith (1992).

It was classified in tribe Bulimulini, in subfamily Bulimulinae within the family Orthalicidae according to the taxonomy of the Gastropoda by Bouchet & Rocroi, 2005.

Breure et al. (2010) moved Bothriembryon to Placostylidae.

Breure & Romero (2012) confirmed previous results from 2010 and they renamed Placostylidae to Bothriembryontidae.

== Species ==
Species within the genus Bothriembryon include:

- Bothriembryon angasianus (Pfeiffer, 1864)
- Bothriembryon balteolus Iredale, 1939
- Bothriembryon barretti Iredale, 1930
- Bothriembryon bradshaweri Iredale, 1939
- Bothriembryon brazieri (Angas, 1871)
- Bothriembryon bulla (Menke, 1843)
- † Bothriembryon consors Kendrick, 1978
- Bothriembryon costulatus (Lamarck, 1822)
- † Bothriembryon douglasi Kendrick, 1978
- Bothriembryon dux (Pfeiffer, 1861)
- Bothriembryon esperantia Iredale, 1939
- Bothriembryon fuscus Thiele, 1930
- † Bothriembryon gardneri Kendrick, 1978
- Bothriembryon glauerti Iredale, 1939
- † Bothriembryon gunnii (Sowerby II in Strzelecki, 1845)
- Bothriembryon indutus (Menke, 1843)
- Bothriembryon irvineanus Iredale, 1939
- Bothriembryon jacksoni Iredale, 1939
- Bothriembryon kendricki Hill, Johnson & Merrifield, 1983
- Bothriembryon kingii (J. E. Gray, 1825)
- † Bothriembryon kremnobates Kendrick, 2005
- Bothriembryon leeuwinensis (E. A. Smith, 1894)
- Bothriembryon mastersi (Cox, 1867)
- Bothriembryon melo (Quoy & Gaimard, 1832) - synonym: Bothriembryon inflatus castaneus Pilsbry 1900
- Bothriembryon naturalistarum Kobelt, 1901
- Bothriembryon notatus Iredale, 1939
- Bothriembryon onslowi (Cox, 1864)
- Bothriembryon perditus Iredale, 1939
- Bothriembryon perobesus Iredale, 1939
- Bothriembryon pilkiensis Ryan et al., 2024
- Bothriembryon praecelcus Iredale, 1939
- † Bothriembryon praecursor McMichael, 1968
- Bothriembryon revectus Iredale, 1939
- Bothriembryon rhodostomus (J. E. Gray, 1834)
- Bothriembryon richeanus Iredale, 1939
- † Bothriembryon ridei Kendrick, 1978
- Bothriembryon sayi (Pfeiffer, 1847)
- Bothriembryon sedgwicki Iredale, 1939
- Bothriembryon serpentinus Iredale, 1939
- Bothriembryon sophiarum Whisson & Breure, 2016
- Bothriembryon spenceri (Tate, 1894)
- Bothriembryon tasmanicus (Pfeiffer, 1853)
- Bothriembryon whitleyi Iredale, 1939
- Bothriembryon gratwicki Cox, 1899 - the taxonomic status of this species status is unclear
