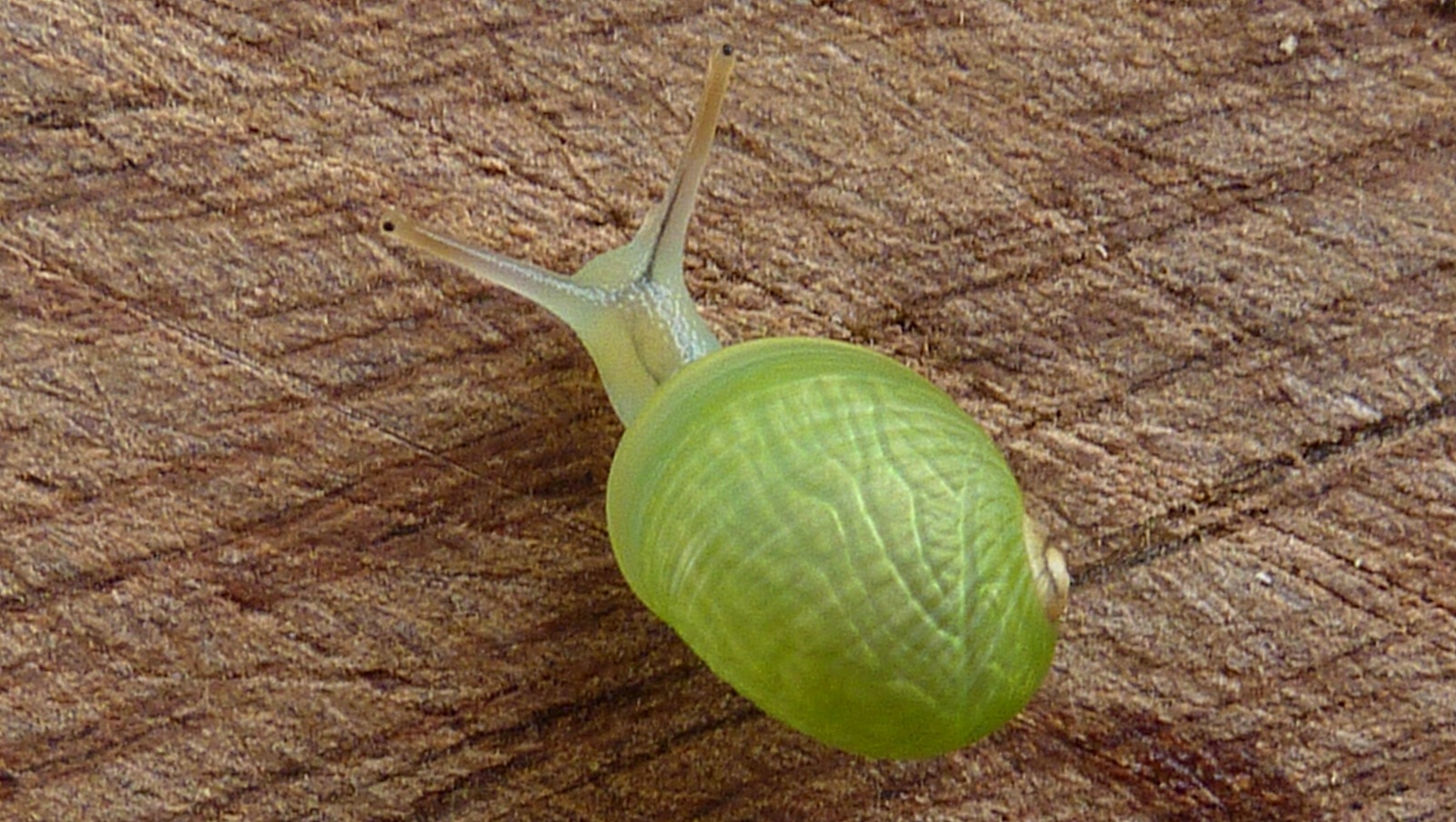
- Dorsal view of a live individual of Simpulopsis rufovirens

Scientific classification
- Kingdom: Animalia
- Phylum: Mollusca
- Class: Gastropoda
- Order: Stylommatophora
- Family: Simpulopsidae
- Genus: Simpulopsis
- Species: S. rufovirens

Binomial name
- Simpulopsis rufovirens (Moricand, 1846)

Synonyms
- Helix (Succinea) rufovirens; Vitrina rufovirens; Vitrina salomonia Pfeiffer, 1853

= Simpulopsis rufovirens =

Species of gastropod

Simpulopsis rufovirens is a species of tropical air-breathing land snail, terrestrial pulmonate gastropod mollusc in the family Simpulopsidae.

The specific name rufovirens refers to the coloration of this species. The name is composed from the Latin word "rufus", which means red or reddish, and from Latin word "virens", which means green.

== Distribution ==
The distribution of Simpulopsis rufovirens includes Brazil.

== Description ==
The shell is semi-globose and very thin. The color of the shell is olive-green or brown-tinted olive in color; somewhat shining but not glossy. The surface is closely and strongly corrugated. The corrugation rather is regular, though sometimes folds split or are intercalated. Spire is conic. The shell has 3½-4 moderately convex whorls. The last whorl is globose. The suture is slowly descending in front. Aperture is rounded-ovate, very oblique, the outer lip thin, its upper end inserted at or near the periphery of the penultimate whorl. The columellar lip is very thin and regularly arcuate.

The width of the shell is 10.7-14 mm; the height of the shell is 11.7-14 mm. The width of the aperture is 9.5 mm; the longest axis of the aperture is 12.4 mm.

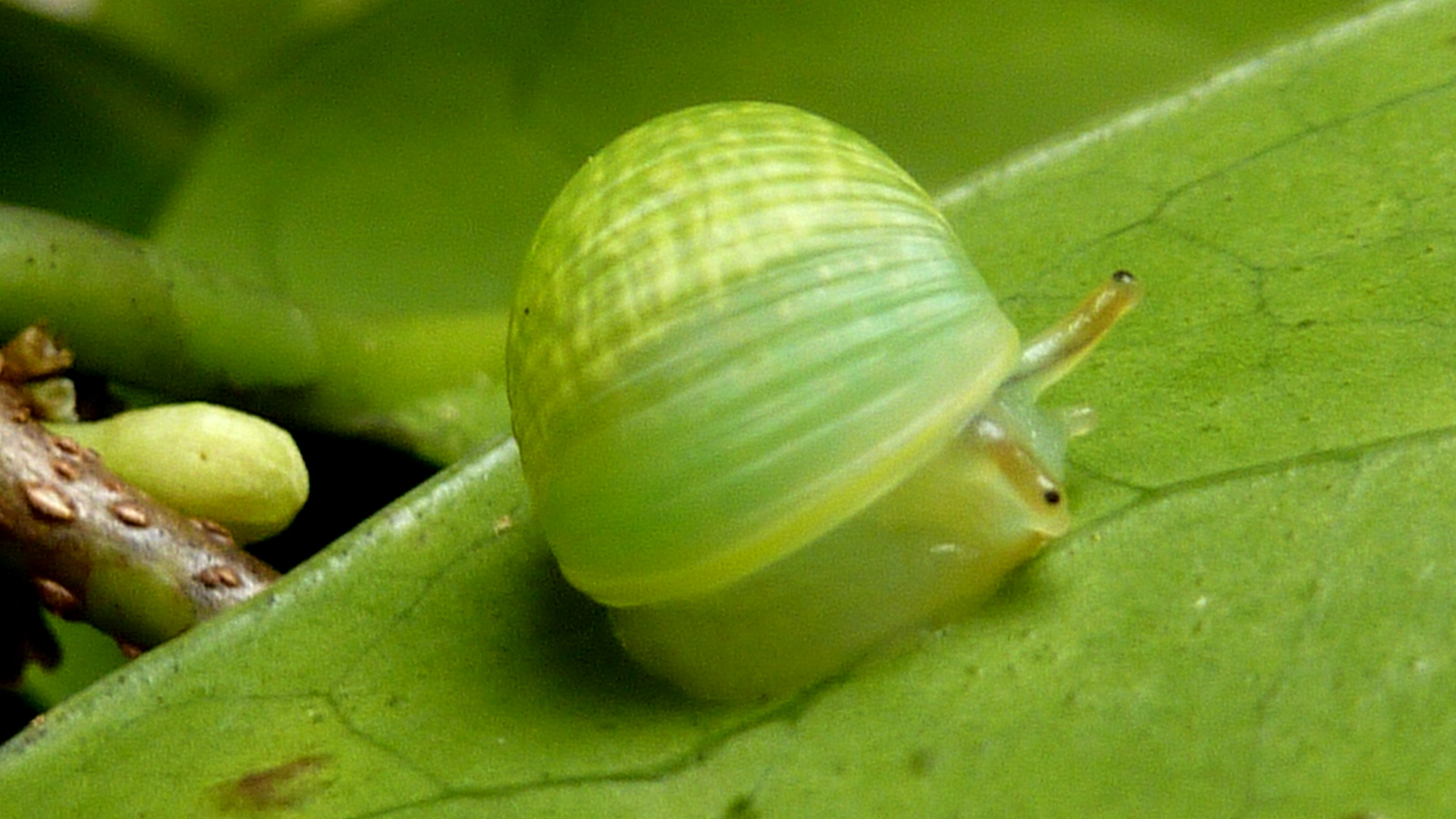
Frontal view of Simpulopsis rufovirens

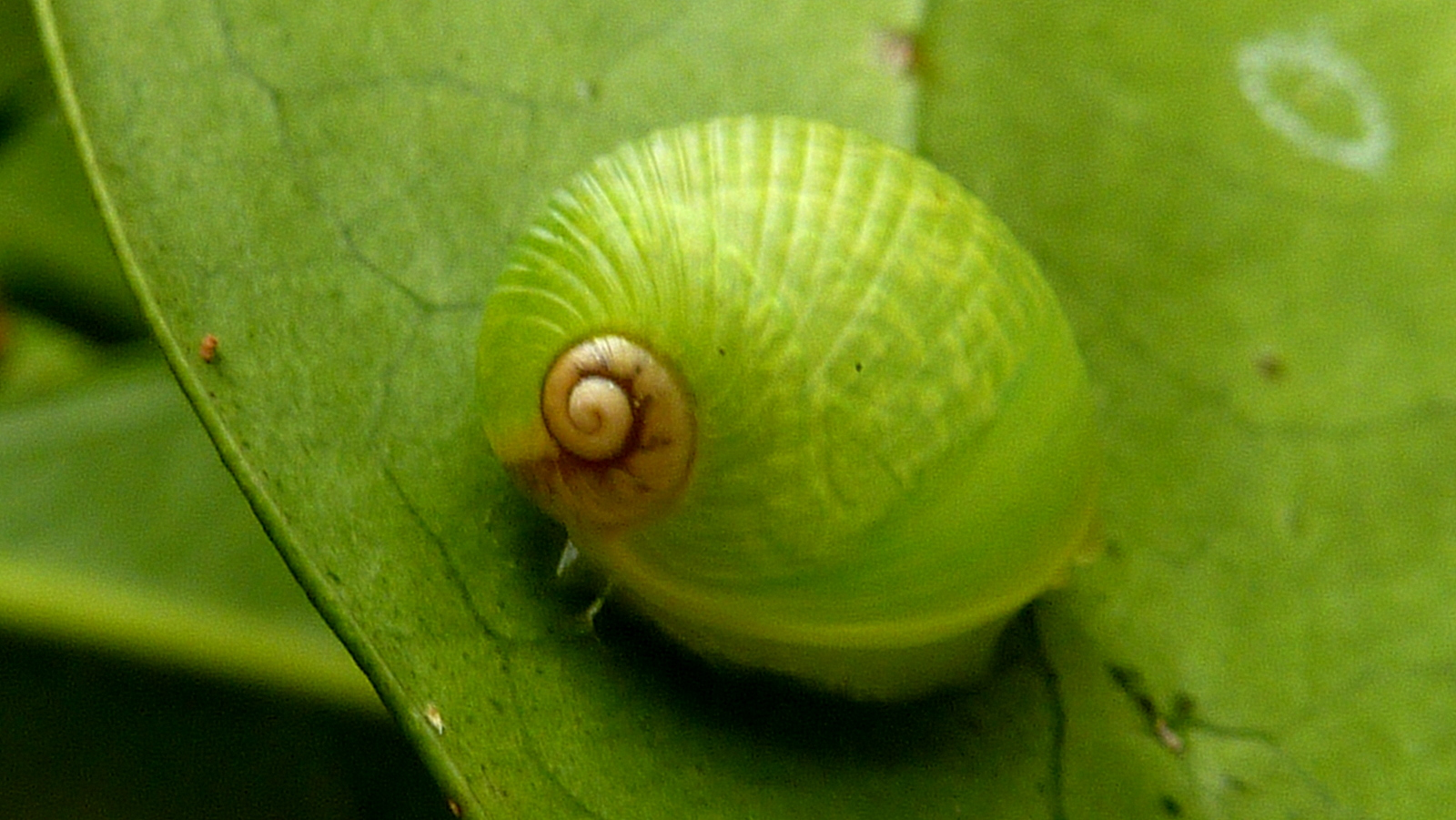
Apical view of Simpulopsis rufovirens

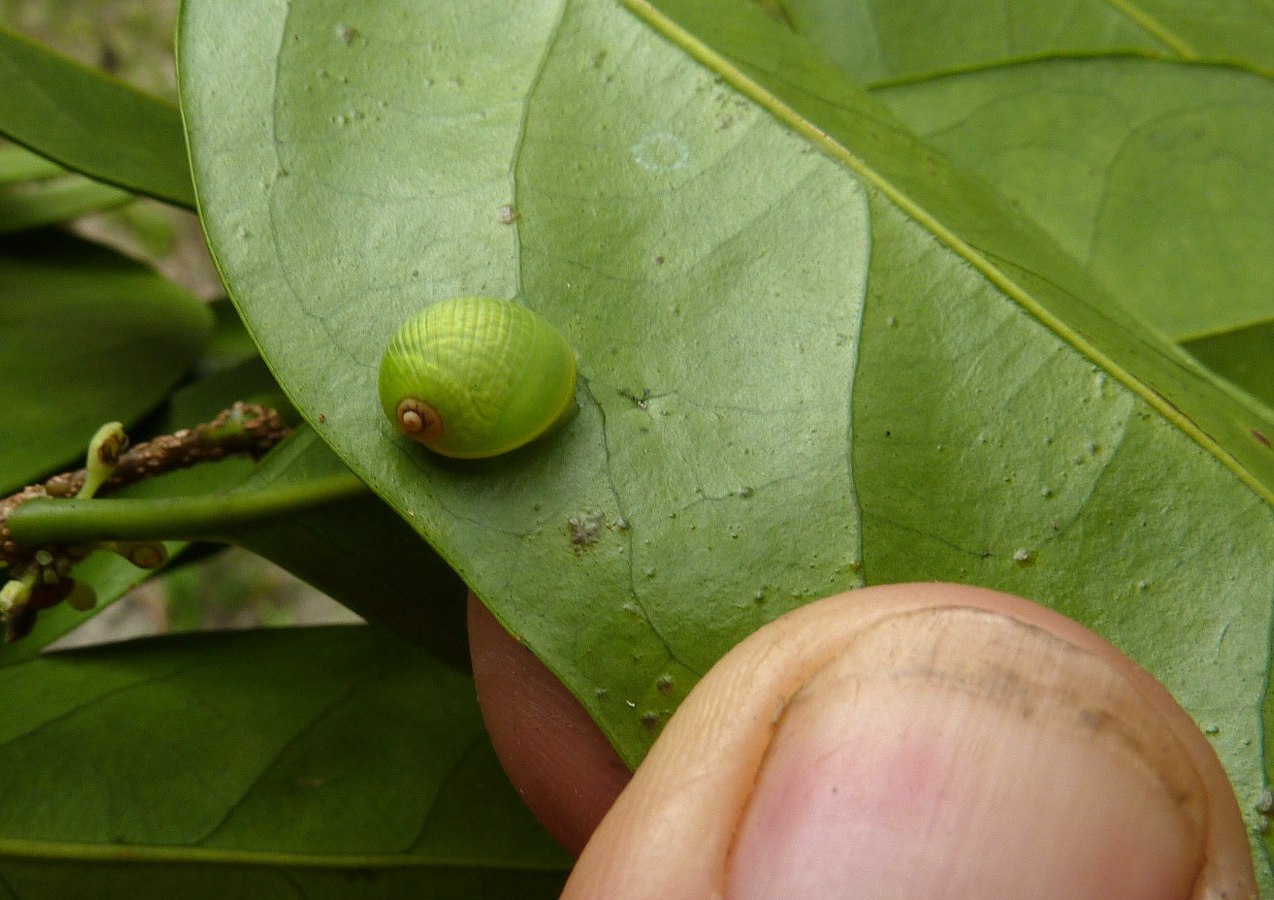
Simpulopsis rufovirens on vegetation

Simpulopsis rufovirens in motion
