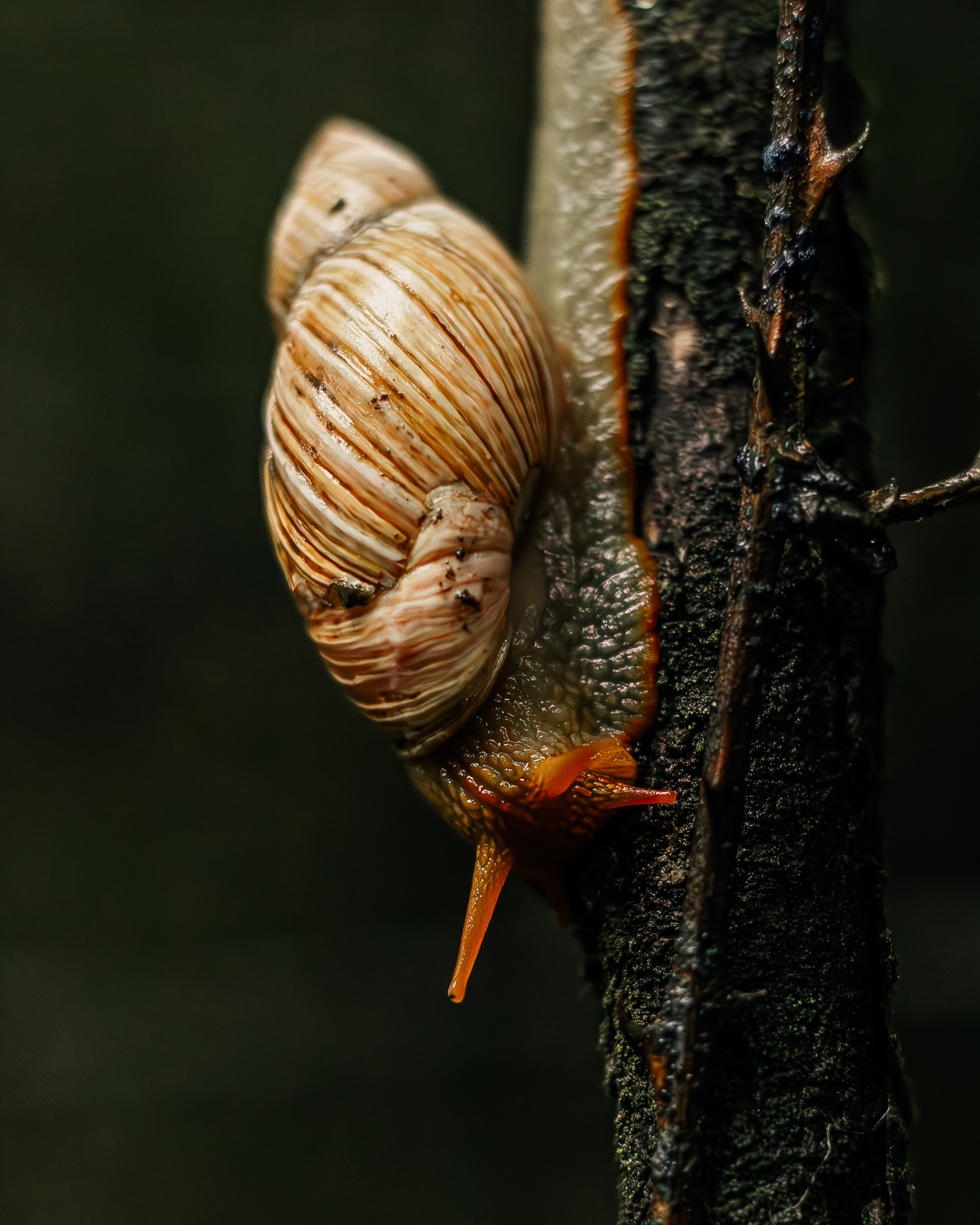
- Plectostylus peruvianus
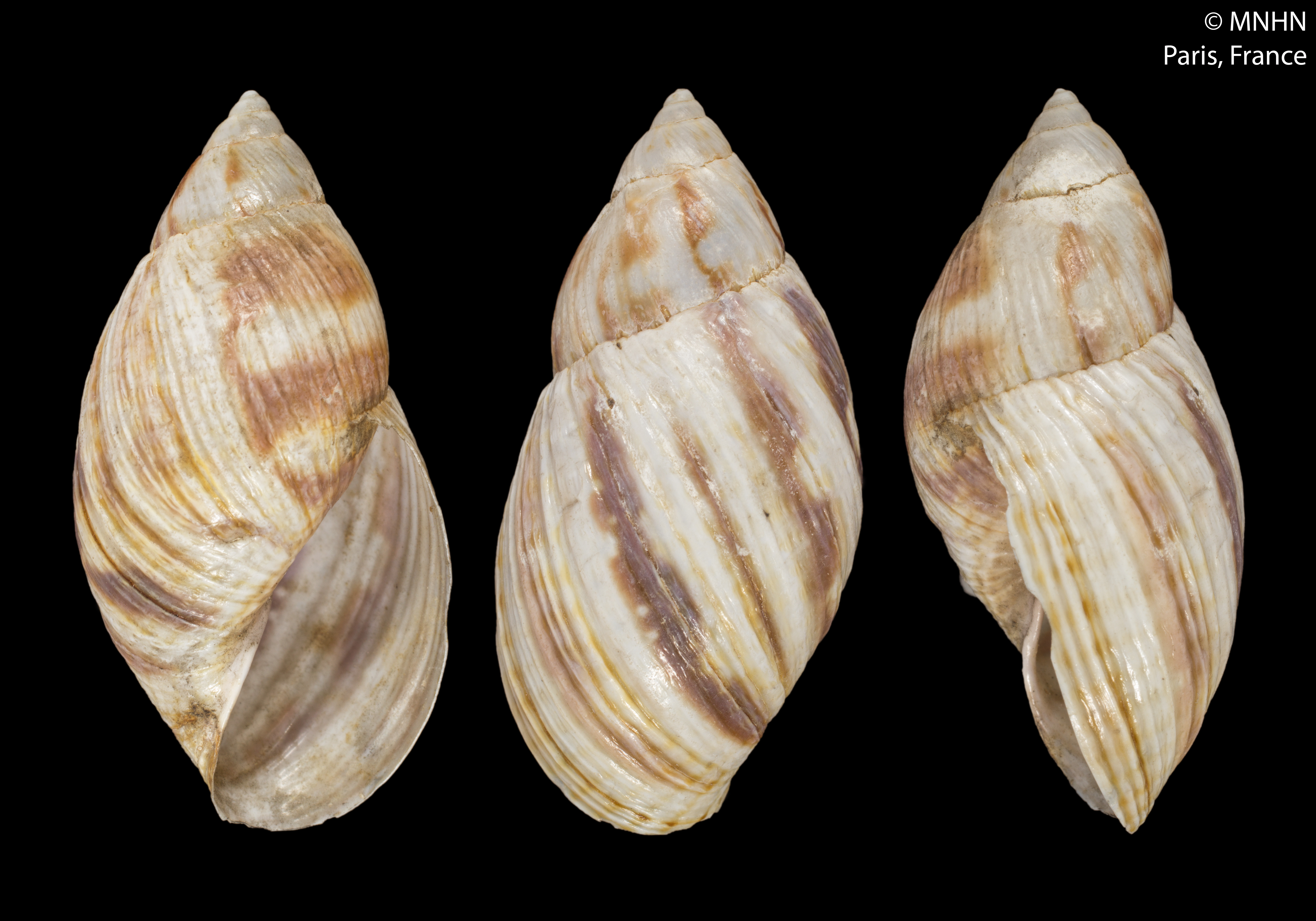
- Shell of Plectostylus peruvianus (lectotype at MNHN, Paris)

Scientific classification
- Kingdom: Animalia
- Phylum: Mollusca
- Class: Gastropoda
- Order: Stylommatophora
- Suborder: Helicina
- Superfamily: Orthalicoidea
- Family: Bothriembryontidae
- Genus: Plectostylus; Beck, 1837

Type species
- Bulimus peruvianus Bruguière, 1789

Synonyms
- Bulimulus (Plectostylus) H. Beck, 1837; Bulimus (Plectostylus) H. Beck, 1837 (original rank)

= Plectostylus =

Genus of land snails

Plectostylus is a genus of gastropods belonging to the subfamily Prestonellinae of the family Bothriembryontidae.

The species of this genus are found in Southern America.

== Species ==
- Plectostylus broderipii (G.B.Sowerby I, 1832)
- Plectostylus chilensis (Lesson, 1831)
- Plectostylus coquimbensis (Broderip, 1832)
- Plectostylus coturnix (G.B.Sowerby I, 1832)
- Plectostylus elegans (L.Pfeiffer, 1843)
- Plectostylus elongata (d'Orbigny, 1837)
- Plectostylus granulosus (Potiez & Michaud, 1835)
- Plectostylus mariae Brooks, 1936
- Plectostylus moestai (Dunker, 1864)
- Plectostylus ochsenii (Dunker, 1856)
- Plectostylus peruvianus (Bruguière, 1789)
- Plectostylus prolatus (A.Gould, 1846)
- Plectostylus punctulifer (G.B.Sowerby I, 1833)
- Plectostylus reflexus (L.Pfeiffer, 1843)

Synonyms

- Plectostylus apolinari Pilsbry, 1935: synonym of Plekocheilus episcopalis corticosus (G. B. Sowerby III, 1895) (junior synonym)
- Plectostylus delicatus Pilsbry, 1935: synonym of Plekocheilus delicatus (Pilsbry, 1935) (original combination)
- Plectostylus variegatus (L. Pfeiffer, 1842): synonym of Plectostylus broderipii (G. B. Sowerby I, 1832) (junior synonym)
- Plectostylus virgatus Pilsbry, 1935: synonym of Plekocheilus pulicarius (Reeve, 1848) (junior synonymy)
