= Grangerellidae =

Scientific classification
- Kingdom: Animalia
- Phylum: Mollusca
- Class: Gastropoda
- Order: Stylommatophora
- Superfamily: Orthalicoidea
- Family: †Grangerellidae; Russell, 1931

Type genus
- Grangerella

Extinct family of gastropods

Grangerellidae is an extinct family of gastropods in the superfamily Orthalicoidea (according to the taxonomy of the Gastropoda by Bouchet & Rocroi, 2005). This family has no subfamilies.

== Genera ==
Genera within the family Grangerellidae include:

- † Grangerella Cockerell, 1915 - the type genus of the family Grangerellidae
- † Protoboysia Cockerell, 1914
