= Archaeostylus =

Archaeostylus Temporal range: Late Pliocene (Waipipian) 3.6–3.0 Ma

Scientific classification
- Kingdom: Animalia
- Phylum: Mollusca
- Class: Gastropoda
- Order: Stylommatophora
- Family: Bothriembryontidae
- Genus: †Archaeostylus
- Species: †A. manukauensis

Binomial name
- †Archaeostylus manukauensis Brook and Hayward, 2022

Species of gastropod

Archaeostylus manukauensis is an extinct species of flax snail, a large air-breathing land snail, a terrestrial pulmonate gastropod mollusc in the family Bothriembryontidae.

This species is the typetaxon and only member of the monotypic genus Archaeostylus, found in Pliocene age sediments of northern New Zealand. Archaeostylus is thought to represent an extinct, sister lineage to the modern flax snail species currently living in New Zealand, and is not a direct ancestor.

== Description ==
Archaeostylus manukauensis has a large 60.2–70.4 millimetres or 2.37–2.77 inches long shell that is thin, elongate-conical, and slightly dorso-ventrally compressed. Unlike other genera of flax snail, A. manukauensis lacks a thickened outer lip surrounding its aperture, and instead possesses a thin peristome with a collabral callus ridge on the palatal wall. In all of the specimens studied, a broad, shelf-like callus ridge extends from top of aperture almost to the base of the columella, bearing a flattened, irregularly rounded, tongue-like projection on its upper part.

== Distribution and habitat ==
Fossils of this extinct land snail species are known only from the Late Pliocene/Waipipian (~3.6–3.0 Ma) Māngere Shellbed, located approximately 30 m below the suburb of Mangere, Auckland. It is currently regarded as one of the two oldest known flax snails species represented in the fossil record, along with a single specimen of another species (Maoristylus pliocenica) also from the Māngere Shellbed. A. manukauensis presumably inhabited lowland broadleaf forest and scrub habitats, similar to recent species of flax snail. Its buoyant shells likely ended up in marine shellbed deposits after being washed to the coast in streams, or in run-off after heavy rainfall.
