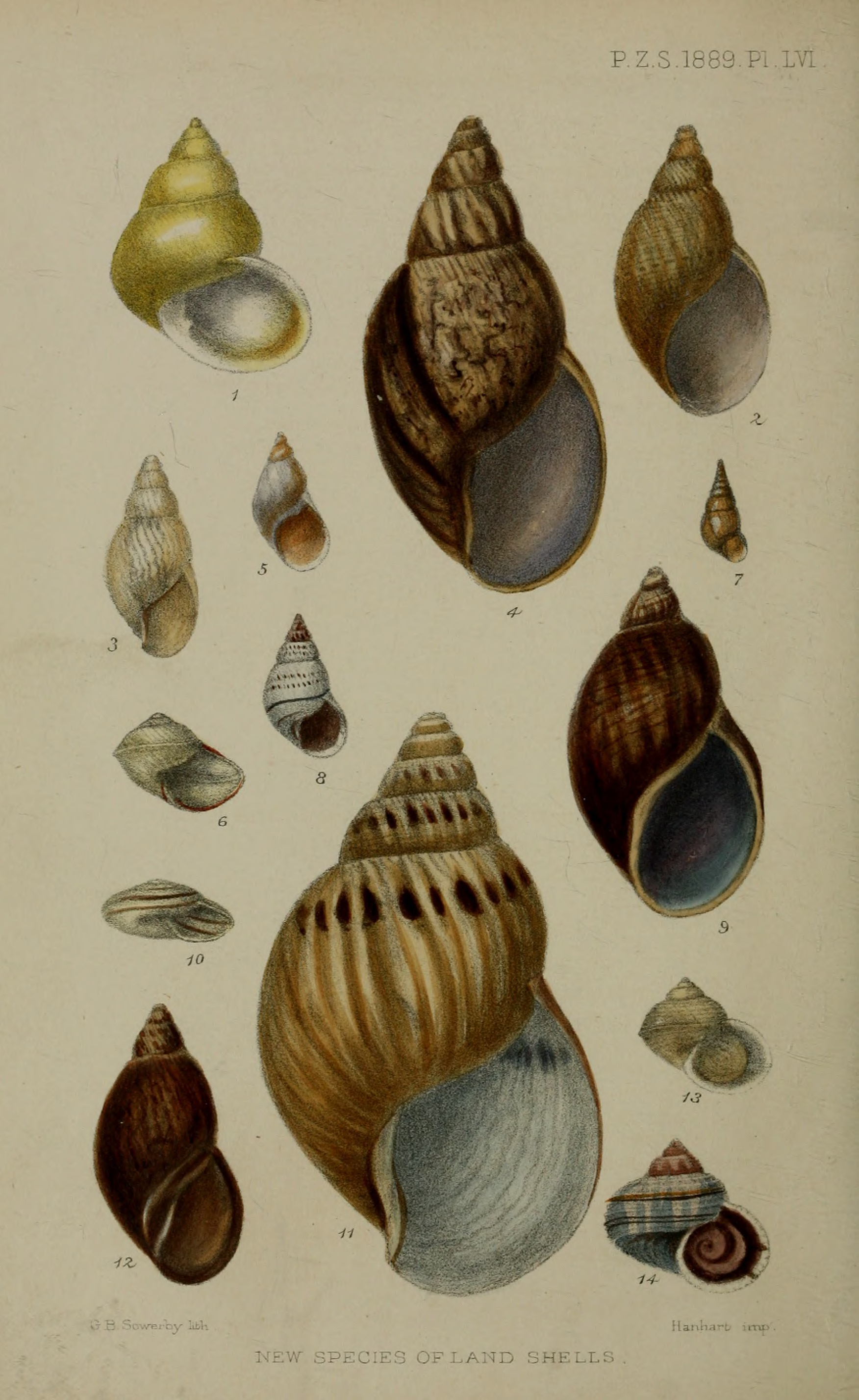
- Prestonella bowkeri shell drawing (figure 5)

Scientific classification
- Kingdom: Animalia
- Phylum: Mollusca
- Class: Gastropoda
- Order: Stylommatophora
- Family: Bothriembryontidae
- Genus: Prestonella
- Species: P. bowkeri

Binomial name
- Prestonella bowkeri (Sowerby III, 1889)

Synonyms
- Bulimus bowkeri

= Prestonella bowkeri =

Species of gastropod

Prestonella bowkeri is a species of air-breathing land snail, terrestrial pulmonate gastropod molluscs in the family Bothriembryontidae.

It was previously classified within Prestonellidae. cf.

Prestonella bowkeri is the type species of the genus Prestonella.

== Distribution ==
This species is endemic to Eastern Cape, South Africa.
