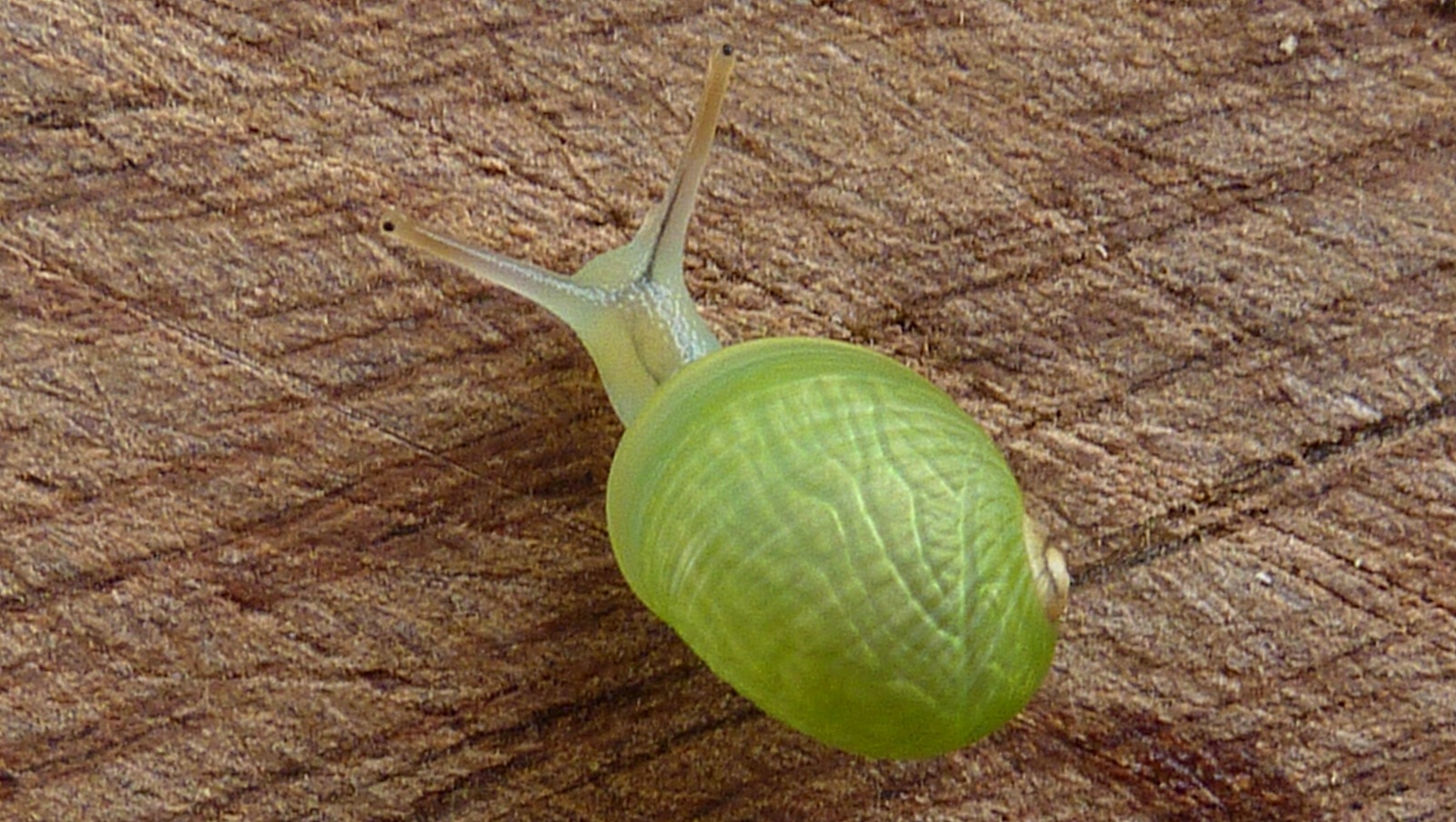
- dorsal view of Simpulopsis rufovirens

Scientific classification
- Kingdom: Animalia
- Phylum: Mollusca
- Class: Gastropoda
- Order: Stylommatophora
- Suborder: Helicina
- Superfamily: Orthalicoidea
- Family: Simpulopsidae; Schileyko, 1999

= Simpulopsidae =

Family of gastropods

Simpulopsidae is a taxonomic family of air-breathing land snails, terrestrial pulmonate gastropod molluscs in the superfamily Orthalicoidea.

== Taxonomy ==
=== 2005 taxonomy ===
This taxon was placed as the tribe Simpulopsini, in the subfamily Bulimulinae, within the family Orthalicidae, according to the taxonomy of the Gastropoda (Bouchet & Rocroi, 2005).

=== 2012 taxonomy ===
Breure & Romero (2012) elevated Simpulopsini to Simpulopsidae.

== Genera ==
Genera in the family Simpulopsidae include:

- Leiostracus Albers, 1850
- Rhinus Albers, 1860
- Simpulopsis Beck, 1837 - type genus of the tribe Simpulopsini
  - subgenus Eudioptus Albers, 1860
