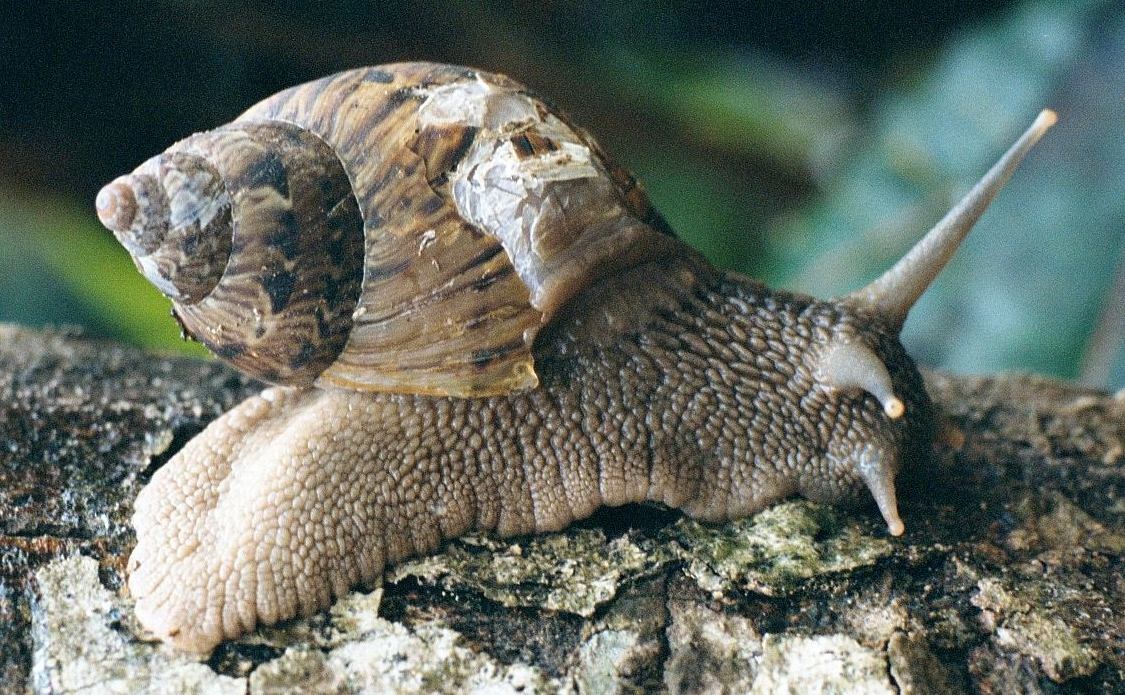
- A large orthalicid from eastern Peru (probably of genus Sultana), recovering from substantial shell damage.

Scientific classification
- Kingdom: Animalia
- Phylum: Mollusca
- Class: Gastropoda
- Superorder: Eupulmonata
- Order: Stylommatophora
- Suborder: Helicina
- Superfamily: Orthalicoidea; Albers, 1860

Families
- See text

Diversity
- ~1750 taxon names are available

= Orthalicoidea =

Superfamily of gastropods

Orthalicoidea is a superfamily of air-breathing land snails, terrestrial gastropod mollusks in the infraorder Orthalicoidei of the suborder Helicina.

== Distribution ==
The Orthalicoidea is a dominant faunal element in the Neotropics, but also has a number of genera with a Gondwanan distribution.

== Taxonomy ==
=== 2005 taxonomy ===
This taxonomy, as accepted by Bouchet & Rocroi, was based on the study by Nordsieck, published in 1986, and the classification as formulated by Schileyko in 1999. However Bouchet & Rocroi diverged from this classification in uniting the families Bulimulidae and Orthalacidae. They also considered the family Placostylidae as a distinct family from Orthalicidae, and the family Coelociontidae a distinct family from Urocoptidae. However, the position of the families Megaspiridae and Grangerellidae is doubtful.

The following seven families have been recognized in the taxonomy of Bouchet & Rocroi (2005):

- Family Cerionidae Pilsbry, 1901
- Family Coelociontidae Iredale, 1937
- † Family Grangerellidae Russell, 1931
- Family Megaspiridae Pilsbry, 1904
- Family Orthalicidae Albers, 1860
- Family Placostylidae Pilsbry, 1946
- Family Urocoptidae Pilsbry, 1898 (1868)
- Vidaliellidae H. Nordsieck, 1986 †

=== 2008 taxonomy ===
Uit de Weerd moved two families Urocoptidae and Cerionidae to newly established superfamily Urocoptoidea based on molecular phylogeny research in 2008.

=== 2009 taxonomy ===
Family Prestonellidae van Bruggen, 1978 - A study by Herbert and Mitchell, published in 2009, places this enigmatic family, of which the phylogenetic relationships were previously unknown, in the Gondwanan superfamily Orthalicoidea, while it was previously tentatively placed as a synonym of Aillyidae.

=== 2010 taxonomy ===
Breure et al. (2010) moved Prestonella and Bothriembryon to Placostylidae and they elevated Bulimulinae to Bulimulidae, Odontostomini to Odontostomidae, Amphibuliminae to Amphibulimidae. They also removed Coelociontidae from Orthalicoidea.

=== 2012 taxonomy ===
Breure & Romero (2012) confirmed previous results from 2010, additionally they elevated Simpulopsini to Simpulopsidae, renamed Placostylidae to Bothriembryontidae. Therefore, there are recognized seven extant families and one extinct family within Orthalicoidea:

- Amphibulimidae P. Fischer, 1873
- Bothriembryontidae Iredale, 1937
- Bulimulidae Tryon, 1867
- † Grangerellidae Russell, 1931
- Megaspiridae Pilsbry, 1904
- Odontostomidae Pilsbry & Vanatta, 1898
- Orthalicidae Albers, 1860
- Simpulopsidae Schileyko, 1999
- † Vidaliellidae H. Nordsieck, 1986
