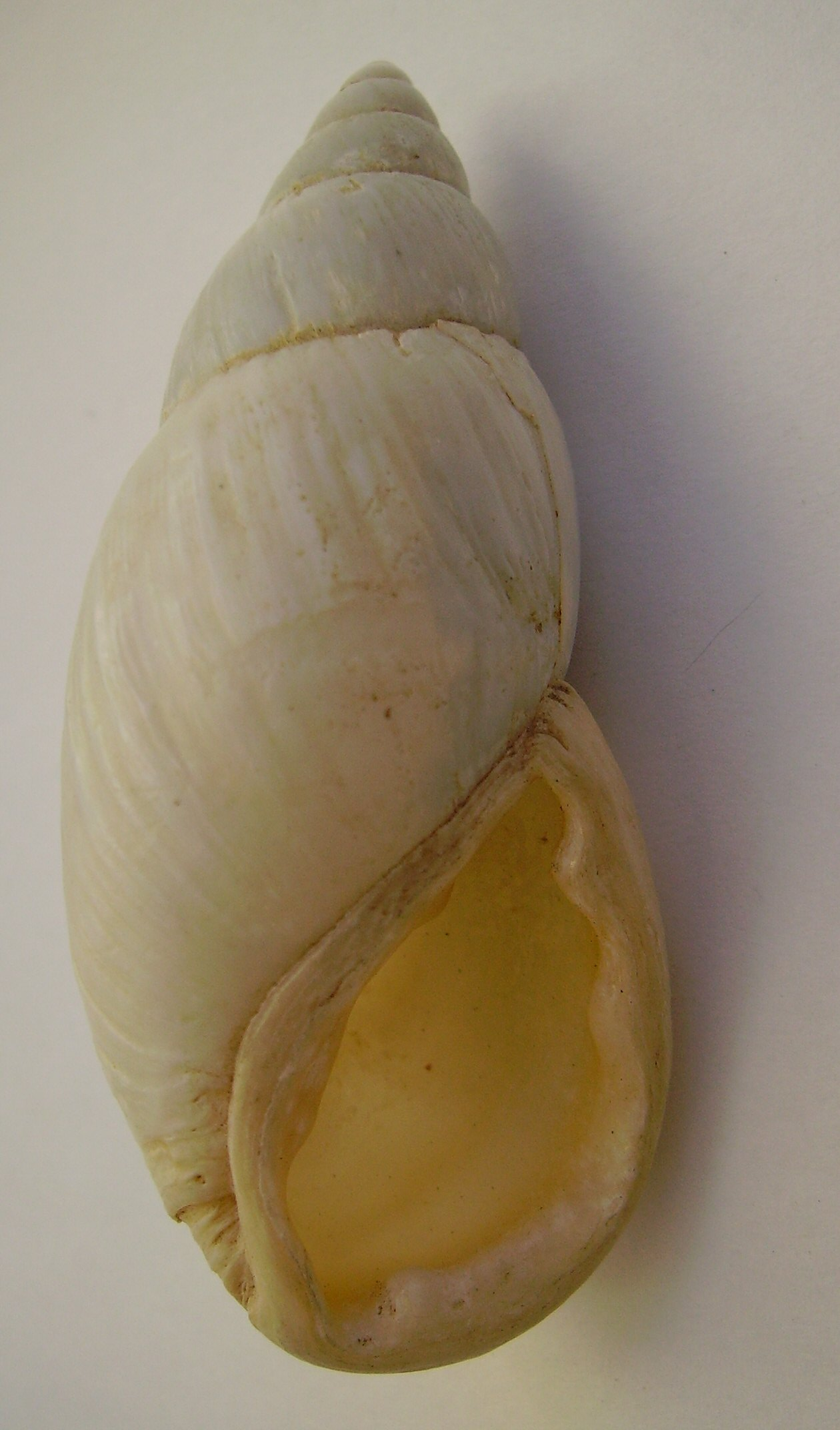
- A shell of the subspecies Placostylus ambagiosus priscus

Scientific classification
- Kingdom: Animalia
- Phylum: Mollusca
- Class: Gastropoda
- Order: Stylommatophora
- Suborder: Helicina
- Superfamily: Orthalicoidea
- Family: Bothriembryontidae; Iredale, 1937

Genera
- See text

Synonyms
- Placostylidae Pilsbry, 1946

= Bothriembryontidae =

Family of gastropods

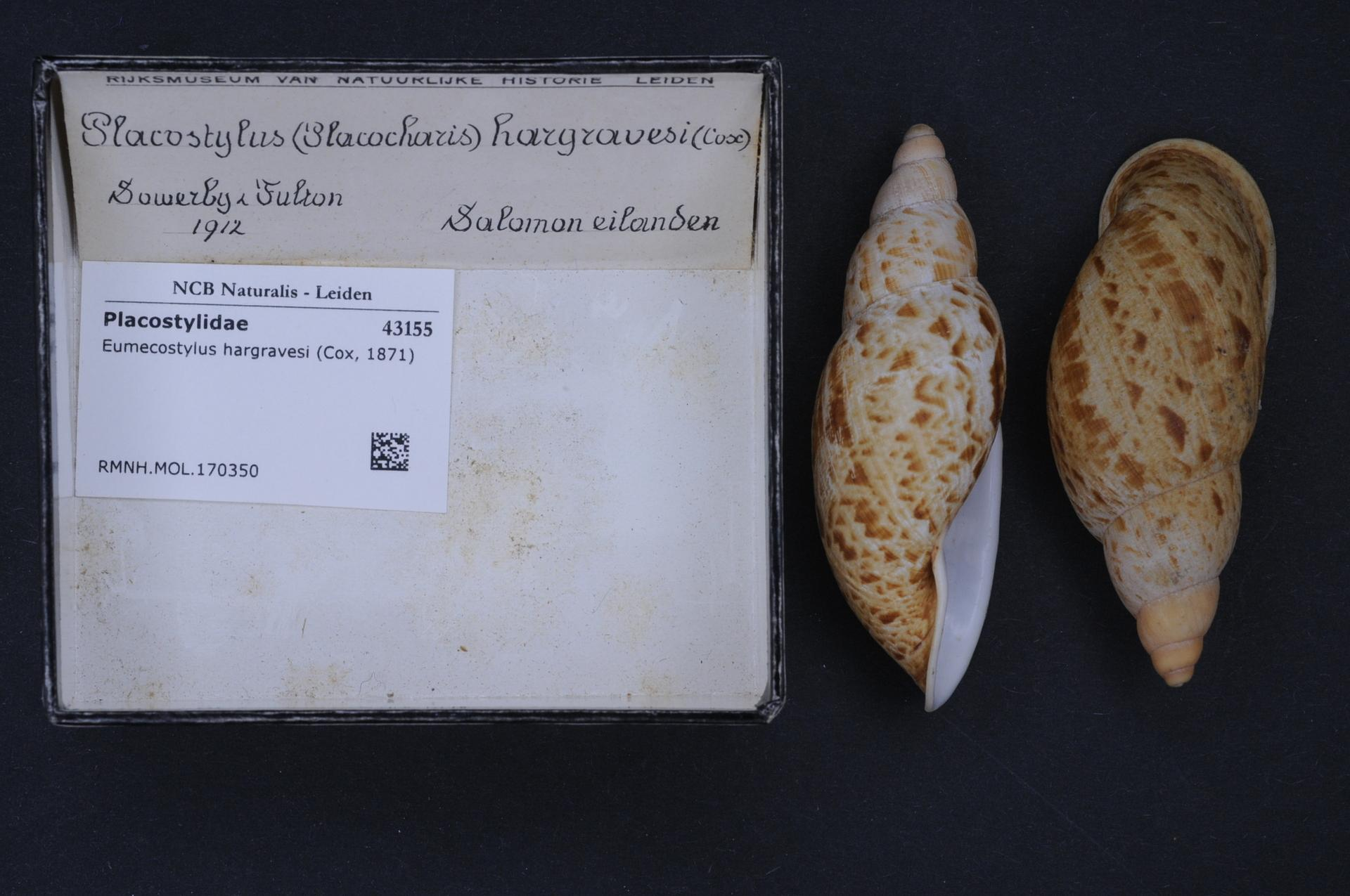
Eumecostylus hargravesi from the Solomon Islands.

Bothriembryontidae is a family of air-breathing land snails, terrestrial pulmonate gastropod mollusks in the superfamily Orthalicoidea.

== Taxonomy ==
This family has been named Placostylidae and had no subfamilies (according to the taxonomy of the Gastropoda by Bouchet & Rocroi, 2005).

Breure et al. (2010) moved Prestonella and Bothriembryon to Placostylidae.

Breure & Romero (2012) confirmed previous results from 2010 and they renamed Placostylidae to Bothriembryontidae.

- subfamily Bothriembryontinae Iredale, 1937
- subfamily Placostylinae Pilsbry, 1946 - for species from New Zealand and Melanesia

Prestonellinae was formally described as a new subfamily within Bothriembryontidae in 2016. Therefore three subfamilies are recognized in Bothriembryontidae:

- subfamily Bothriembryontinae Iredale, 1937
- subfamily Placostylinae Pilsbry, 1946
- Prestonellinae van Bruggen, Herbert & Breure, 2016

== Genera ==
Genera within the family Bothriembryontidae include:

Bothriembryontinae

- Bothriembryon - the type genus of the family Bothriembryontidae

Bothriembryontidae incertae sedis (temporary name)

- Alterorhinus Salvador, F. S. Silva & Cavallari, 2023

Placostylinae

- Archaeostylus Brook & Hayward, 2022
- Aspastus Albers, 1850
- Basileostylus F. Haas, 1935
- Callistocharis Pilsbry, 1900
- Diplomorpha Ancey, 1884
- Eumecostylus Martens in Albers, 1860
- Euplacostylus Crosse, 1875
- Leucocharis Pilsbry, 1900
- Placocharis Pilsbry, 1900
- Placostylus Beck, 1837 - the type genus of the (sub)family Placostylidae
- Poecilocharis Kobelt, 1891
- Quiros Solem, 1959
- Santacharis Iredale, 1927

Prestonellinae

- Discoleus Breure, 1978
- Plectostylus Beck, 1837
- Prestonella Connolly, 1929 - type genus of the subfamily Prestonellinae

A cladogram based on nuclear ITS2, 28S rRNA and histone 3 (H3) and sequences of mitochondrial cytochrome-c oxidase I (COI) genes showing phylogenic relations of Bothriembryontidae by Breure & Romero (2012):

- Bothriembryontidae
  - - - - Plectostylus
          Plectostylus peruvianus
        - Discoleus
          Discoleus ameghinoi
      - Prestonella
        - Prestonella bowkeri
        - Prestonella nuptialis
    - Bothriembryon
      - Bothriembryon dux
      - Bothriembryon indutus
  - - Placostylus
      - Placostylus eddystonensis
      - Placostylus ambagiosus
    - - Eumecostylus
        Eumecostylus uliginosus
      - Placocharis
        Placocharis strangei

== Distribution ==
Bothriembryontidae have Gondwanan distribution.
