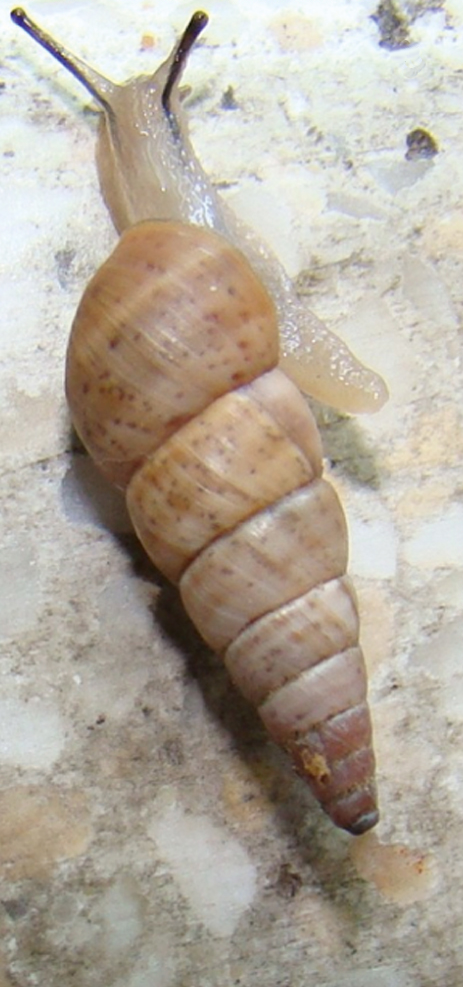

Scientific classification
- Kingdom: Animalia
- Phylum: Mollusca
- Class: Gastropoda
- Order: Stylommatophora
- Family: Bulimulidae
- Genus: Bostryx
- Species: B. turritus

Binomial name
- Bostryx turritus (Broderip, 1832)

Synonyms
- Bulinus turritus Broderip in Broderip & Sowerby, 1832

= Bostryx turritus =

Species of gastropod

Bostryx turritus is a species of tropical air-breathing land snail, a pulmonate gastropod mollusk in the family Bulimulidae.

== Distribution ==
- Peru

This species was known from Trujillo Province in La Libertad Region (Pilsbry, 1896) and Pariacoto in Ancash Region (Haas, 1955). Recently, Ramírez (2004) reported it from Cerro Pasamayo and Salinas de Huacho in Lima Region. She also refers to unpublished data by Weyrauch, who collected the species at Cerro Campana, 14 km north of Trujillo 07°58’54’S 079°06’24’W (selected as type locality by Ramírez) and near Chilete in Cajamarca Region. Breure (1978) reported the species from the same department near Magdalena. Breure (2010) reported it from Catzcal 1050 m, 09°54’43’S 077°49’40’W, Ancash Region, Peru.

Zilch (1953) reports Bostryx turritus turritus (shell height/shell width = 3.25) from Hacienda El Casa Grande (probably near 07°40’S 078°40’W) in La Libertad Region, and described Bostryx turritus tamboensis (shell height/shell width = 2.87) from the same locality, albeit from different elevations (1500 m resp. 1000 m). According to Haas (1955) – reporting a locality at 1360 m – his shells ‘are slightly more slender than the typical form’. The specimens from Catzcal show a variation in ration shell height/shell width from 2.84 to 3.18 (mean 3.00; n = 7). It is possible that this variation can also be found in the populations at the localities in La Libertad, in which case Bostryx turritus tamboensis should be considered a synonym of the nominate taxon.

== Description ==
Living animal are whitish-grey throughout, the black eye-retractors are shining through the tentacles and the dorsal side of the body.
