= Bostryx elatus =

Scientific classification
- Kingdom: Animalia
- Phylum: Mollusca
- Class: Gastropoda
- Order: Stylommatophora
- Family: Bulimulidae
- Genus: Bostryx
- Species: B. elatus

Binomial name
- Bostryx elatus (Philippi, 1869)

Synonyms
- Bulimus elatus Philippi, 1869

Species of gastropod

Bostryx elatus is a species of tropical air-breathing land snail, a pulmonate gastropod mollusk in the family Bulimulidae.

== Distribution ==
Distribution of Bostryx elatus include Peru.

This species was originally described from ‘Pichicna, 2 leagues from Icucha […] between Mayoc and Huanta’. This points to a region between Mayoc in Huancavelica Region, 2200 m, 12°48’40’S 074°23’07’W and, most probably Huanta [misspelling for Huantana], 3000 m, 13°46’01’S 073°37’13’W in Apurímac Region.

Fritz Haas (1955) reported on specimens collected near Mayoc and Locroja [3700 m, 12°41’S 074°26’W] in Huancavelica Region and added Palmira [2300 m, 13°35’19’S 073°11’25’W] in Apurímac Region.

Beure (2010) reported on specimens collected ca. 55 km North-West of Mayoc.

== Description ==
Haas (1955) also noted that the colour pattern varied more in the specimens from near Mayoc and Locroja. The variety in patterns, from uniformly greyish-white to uniformly streaked at irregular intervals, is also observed in material collected by Breure (2010). The aberrant pattern noted by Haas, viz. streaks with ‘lateral, triangular appendages that tend to be arranged in spiral rows’ has been observed in a single shell from the series examined by Breure (2010).
