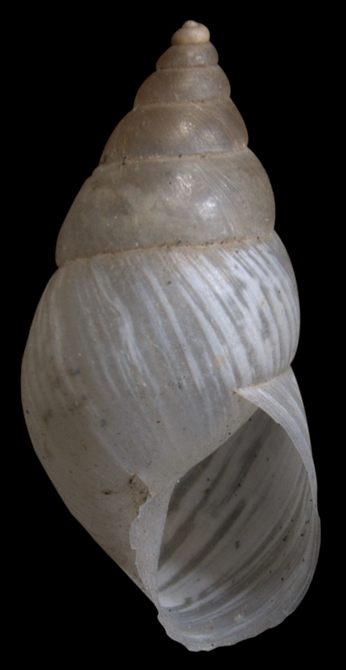
- Holotype of the shell of Bostryx fragilis. Shell height 18.0 mm.

Scientific classification
- Domain: Eukaryota
- Kingdom: Animalia
- Phylum: Mollusca
- Class: Gastropoda
- Order: Stylommatophora
- Family: Bulimulidae
- Genus: Bostryx
- Species: B. fragilis

Binomial name
- Bostryx fragilis Breure & Mogollón Avila, 2010

= Bostryx fragilis =

Species of gastropod

Bostryx fragilis is a species of tropical air-breathing land snail, a pulmonate gastropod mollusk in the family Bulimulidae.

The specific epithet fragilis is from the Latin language and means "fragile", it refers to the thin shell.

== Distribution ==
- Peru

The type locality is Quebrada Santa Maria, 03°40’53’S 080°26’10’W, 25 m, Tumbes Region, Peru.

== Description ==
Bostryx fragilis is characterized by the whitish lines on the thin, translucent shell, the tawny-brownish upper whorls and the prominent last whorl.

The shell up to 18.9 mm in height, two times as long as wide, narrowly perforate, elongate, with hardly convex sides and fragile. Colour is whitish on a translucent background, the upper whorls are becoming gradually tawny-brown towards the apex. The surface is slightly shining, the incrassate growth striae overlaid on the last whorls by whitish, low, axial costulae, which are partly forked and do not always cover the whole whorl, but may end in between the sutures or shell base. Upper whorls are with fine, interrupted spiral threads. Protoconch is with wrinkles, mostly broken into granules and crossed by finely incised spiral lines. The shell has 6.8 whorls, that are hardly convex. The suture is slightly impressed. The aperture is elongate-subovate, 1.61 times as long as wide, 0.40 times the total height. Peristome is thin and simple. Columellar margin is nearly straight, very narrowly dilated above.

The shell has 6.6-7.1 whorls. The width of the shell is 8.0-9.2 mm. The height of the shell is 16.9-18.9 mm. The width of the aperture is 4–5 mm. The height of the aperture is 6.6-8.2 mm. The height of the last whorl is 9.2-11.9 mm.

The holotype has 6.8 whorls and dimensions of the holotype are as follows: The width of the shell is 8.7 mm. The height of the shell is 18.0 mm. The width of the aperture is 4.5 mm. The height of the aperture is 7.3 mm. The height of the last whorl is 11.3 mm.

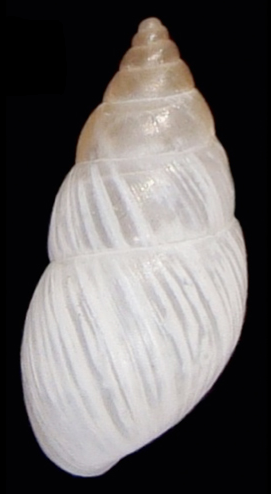
Paratype of the shell of Thaumastus flori. Shell height 17.4 mm.

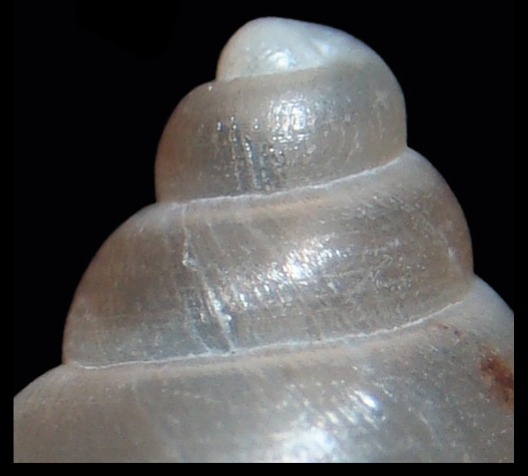
Photo of upper whorls of Bostryx fragilis showing fine, interrupted spiral lines and protoconch sculpture.

Bostryx fragilis is closely allied to Bostryx juana (Cousin, 1887) from which it differs by (1) being smaller, (2) slightly more slender and (3) lacking the tawny-brown spiral bands. Bostryx fragilis further resembles Bostryx alausiensis (Cousin, 1887), also described from southern Ecuador. It differs by being (1) smaller, (2) stouter, and (3) having a larger aperture. Finally, it may be compared to Bostryx delicatulus (Philippi, 1867) from which it differs by (1) being stouter, (2) the brownish upper whorls and (3) the simple peristome.

There is a morphological resemblance between the species mentioned above and some Bulimulus species occurring in the same region, e.g. Bulimulus inconspicuus Haas, 1949, both in general shell shape and - superficially - also in protoconch sculpture. The relationships and phylogeography of these two genera in this region warrant further study.
