= Bostryx edmundi =

Scientific classification
- Kingdom: Animalia
- Phylum: Mollusca
- Class: Gastropoda
- Order: Stylommatophora
- Family: Bulimulidae
- Genus: Bostryx
- Species: B. edmundi

Binomial name
- Bostryx edmundi Breure & Neubert, 2008

Species of gastropod

Bostryx edmundi is a species of tropical air-breathing land snail, a pulmonate gastropod mollusk in the family Bulimulidae.

== Distribution ==
- The type locality is Yacca (right bank of the Cañete River, on the road from Cañete to Yauyos), Peru

Another locality is Magdalena [2300 m, 12°29’27’S 075°54’42’W], Lima Region, Peru is about 5 km north of the type locality.
