= Bostryx granulatus =

Scientific classification
- Kingdom: Animalia
- Phylum: Mollusca
- Class: Gastropoda
- Order: Stylommatophora
- Family: Bulimulidae
- Genus: Bostryx
- Species: B. granulatus

Binomial name
- Bostryx granulatus Breure & Neubert, 2008

Species of gastropod

Bostryx granulatus is a species of tropical air-breathing land snail, a pulmonate gastropod mollusk in the family Bulimulidae.

== Distribution ==
- Peru

== Description ==
The topotypes collected show that the granulation, which is visible in fresh collected specimens, fades away when the shells are bleached; otherwise these specimens are characteristic.

Smaller specimens of Bostryx granulatus may also be compared to Bostryx superbus Weyrauch, 1967, a species living at higher altitudes in the same Río Cañete valley. Bostryx granulatus however, may be distinguished by the slightly expanded base of the lip, the more slender shell shape and the granulation on the last whorl.
