= Alvania microglypta =

Scientific classification
- Kingdom: Animalia
- Phylum: Mollusca
- Class: Gastropoda
- Subclass: Caenogastropoda
- Order: Littorinimorpha
- Superfamily: Rissooidea
- Family: Rissoidae
- Genus: Alvania
- Species: A. microglypta

Binomial name
- Alvania microglypta F. Haas, 1943

Synonyms
- Alvania (Willetia) microglypta F. Haas, 1943 (Willetia incorrect subsequent spelling of Willettia, Willettia synonymized with Alvania)

Species of gastropod

Alvania microglypta is a species of small sea snail, a marine gastropod mollusc or micromollusc in the family Rissoidae.

== Distribution ==
This species occurs in the Pacific Ocean off California, USA.
