= Bostryx ceroplasta =

Scientific classification
- Kingdom: Animalia
- Phylum: Mollusca
- Class: Gastropoda
- Order: Stylommatophora
- Family: Bulimulidae
- Genus: Bostryx
- Species: B. ceroplasta

Binomial name
- Bostryx ceroplasta (Pilsbry, 1896)

Synonyms
- Bulimulus (Bostryx) ceroplasta Pilsbry, 1896

Species of gastropod

Bostryx ceroplasta is a species of tropical air-breathing land snail, a pulmonate gastropod mollusk in the family Bulimulidae.

== Distribution ==
- Peru

== Description ==
The shells are, as Pilsbry calls them, ‘waxen white’. Some specimens have the apex coloured, corneous or with a yellow hue.
