= Odostomia ornatissima =

Scientific classification
- Kingdom: Animalia
- Phylum: Mollusca
- Class: Gastropoda
- Family: Pyramidellidae
- Genus: Odostomia
- Species: O. ornatissima

Binomial name
- Odostomia ornatissima (Haas, 1943)

Synonyms
- Chrysallida ornatissima (Haas, 1943)

Species of gastropod

Odostomia ornatissima is a species of sea snail, a marine gastropod mollusc in the family Pyramidellidae, the pyrams and their allies.

== Distribution ==
This species occurs in the Pacific Ocean off California.
