= Drymaeus inconspicuus =

Scientific classification
- Kingdom: Animalia
- Phylum: Mollusca
- Class: Gastropoda
- Order: Stylommatophora
- Family: Bulimulidae
- Genus: Drymaeus
- Species: D. inconspicuus

Binomial name
- Drymaeus inconspicuus (Haas, 1949)

Synonyms
- Bulimulus (Bulimulus) inconspicuus Haas, 1949

Species of gastropod

Drymaeus inconspicuus is a species of tropical air-breathing land snail, a pulmonate gastropod mollusk in the family Bulimulidae.

== Distribution ==
- Peru

== Description ==
Adult specimens of Drymaeus inconspicuus can measure up to 25 mm shell height. The species is characterized by the corneous-brown upper whorls and the suture, which is bordered by a white line, descending slightly in front.

Fritz Haas, in 1949, compared this species to Bulimulus transparens (Reeve, 1849), stating that his material was slightly smaller (17 vs. 19 mm shell height). The type material of Bulimulus transparens is located in the Natural History Museum (BMNH 1975397) and is labelled ‘Venezuela’ (Breure, 1978: 147). If this locality is correct, a close relationship as suggested by Haas seems improbable.
