= Bostryx longispira =

Scientific classification
- Domain: Eukaryota
- Kingdom: Animalia
- Phylum: Mollusca
- Class: Gastropoda
- Order: Stylommatophora
- Family: Bulimulidae
- Genus: Bostryx
- Species: B. longispira

Binomial name
- Bostryx longispira Weyrauch, 1960

Synonyms
- Bostryx (Pseudoperonaeus) longispira Weyrauch, 1960

Species of gastropod

Bostryx longispira is a species of tropical air-breathing land snail, a pulmonate gastropod mollusk in the family Bulimulidae.

== Distribution ==
- Peru

This species appears to be locally abundant in Lima Region, Peru.
