= Bostryx anomphalus =

Scientific classification
- Kingdom: Animalia
- Phylum: Mollusca
- Class: Gastropoda
- Order: Stylommatophora
- Family: Bulimulidae
- Genus: Bostryx
- Species: B. anomphalus

Binomial name
- Bostryx anomphalus Pilsbry, 1944

Synonyms
- Bostryx (Peronaeus) anomphalus Pilsbry, 1944

Species of gastropod

Bostryx anomphalus is a species of tropical air-breathing land snail, a pulmonate gastropod mollusk in the family Bulimulidae.

== Distribution ==
- Peru The northernmost limit of this species is Cajamarca Region.

== Description ==
This is a variable species in its colour pattern, some specimens being uniformly whitish, others with axial streaks of various shades of brown at irregular intervals. Several specimens show a faint pattern of two or three spiral bands on the last whorl, the broadest around the shell base and one or two above the periphery. The upper whorls are whitish, bluish or in some specimens roseate.
