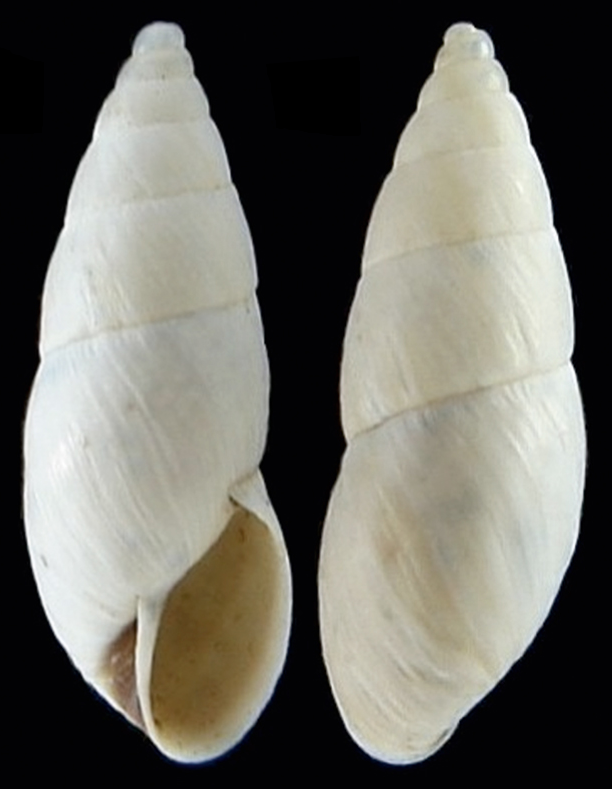
- shell of Bostryx chusgonensis sipas

Scientific classification
- Domain: Eukaryota
- Kingdom: Animalia
- Phylum: Mollusca
- Class: Gastropoda
- Order: Stylommatophora
- Family: Bulimulidae
- Genus: Bostryx
- Species: B. chusgonensis

Binomial name
- Bostryx chusgonensis Weyrauch, 1960

= Bostryx chusgonensis =

Species of gastropod

Bostryx chusgonensis is a species of tropical air-breathing land snail, a pulmonate gastropod mollusk in the family Bulimulidae.

== Subspecies ==
- Bostryx chusgonensis chusgonensis Weyrauch, 1960
- Bostryx chusgonensis sipas Breure & Mogollón Avila, 2010

== Distribution ==
- Peru

The nominate taxon was described from La Libertad Region, Río Chusgon area, at 1550–1900 m.

The type locality of Bostryx chusgonensis sipas is Shipasbamba [05°54’25’S 078°02’35’W, 1360 m], Amazonas Region, Peru. The description of Bostryx chusgonensis sipas extends the range ca. 180 km more northward within the drainage system of the Río Marañon. The Bostryx chusgonensis sipas is separated by mountain ranges from the nominate subspecies.

== Description ==
According to Weyrauch (1960) a ribbed form and a colour form with small brownish dots occur in the nominate subspecies.

=== Bostryx chusgonensis sipas ===
Subspecies Bostryx chusgonensis sipas differs from Bostryx chusgonensis chusgonensis by (1) being larger (up to 13.4 vs. 11.4 mm), (2) the less impressed suture, (3) in streaked specimens, the axial streaks continuing till the base of the shell. The subspecific name sipas is derived from "(Quechua) sipas", that means young woman; referring to the spindle-shaped shell and to the type locality, Shipasbamba. The epithet is used as a noun in apposition. It is characterized by its small size (13 mm), spindle-shape, whitish colour and smooth surface.

The height of the shell is up to 13.4 mm, three times as long as wide, rimate, spindle-shaped, with slightly convex sides, rather thin. Colour is uniformly greyish-whitish or with axial streaks of light to dark-brown, the upper whorls somewhat darker; a dark band around the rimate umbilicus. Surface is hardly shining, with incrassate growth striae. Protoconch is smooth. The shell has 6.5 whorls, that are hardly convex. The suture is slightly impressed. The aperture is elongate-ovate, margins somewhat converging; 1.59 times as long as wide, 0.25 times the total height. Peristome simple, whitish. Columellar margin straight, hardly expanded; no parietal callus.

Dimension of the holotype of Bostryx chusgonensis sipas are as follows: The width of the shell is 4.7 mm. The height of the shell is 13.5 mm. The width of the aperture is 3.2 mm. The height of the aperture is 5.2 mm. The height of the last whorl is 8.39 mm. The shell has 6.5 whorls.
