= List of non-marine molluscs of Chile =

Location of Chile

The non-marine molluscs of Chile are part of the molluscan fauna of Chile.

A number of species of non-marine molluscs are found in the wild in Chile.

== Freshwater gastropods ==
Tateidae

- Potamopyrgus antipodarum (Gray, 1843)

Planorbidae

- Uncancylus foncki (Philippi, 1866)

== Land gastropods ==
Charopidae

- Stephacharopa calderaensis Miquel & Araya, 2013
- Lilloiconcha lopezi Araya & Aliaga, 2015

Ellobiidae

- Marinula pepita King, 1832
- Sarnia frumentum (Petit de Saussaye, 1842)

Macrocyclidae

- Macrocyclis peruvianus Lamarck, 1822

Pupillidae

- Pupoides minimus (Philippi, 1860)

Strophocheilidae

- Chiliborus bridgesii (Pfeiffer, 1842)
- Chiliborus pachychilus (Pfeiffer, 1842)
- Chiliborus rosaceus (King & Broderip I, 1831)

Helicidae

- Cornu aspersum (Müller, 1774) - non-indigenous

Orthalicidae

genus Bostryx - 29 species

- Bostryx affinis (Broderip, 1832)
- Bostryx anachoreta (Pfeiffer, 1856)
- Bostryx ancavilorum (Araya, 2015)
- Bostryx albicans (Broderip, 1832)
- Bostryx anachoreta (Pfeiffer, 1856)
- Bostryx breurei (Araya, 2015)
- Bostryx calderaensis (Araya, 2015)
- Bostryx derelictus (Broderip, 1832)
- Bostryx eremothauma (Pilsbry, 1896)
- Bostryx erosus (Broderip, 1832)
- Bostryx erythrostoma (Sowerby, 1833)
- Bostryx gayi (Rehder, 1945)
- Bostryx guttatus (Broderip, 1832)
- Bostryx hennahi (Gray, 1830)
- Bostryx holostoma (Pfeiffer, 1856)
- Bostryx huascensis (Reeve, 1848)
- Bostryx ireneae (Araya, 2015)
- Bostryx ischnus (Pilsbry, 1902)
- Bostryx koehleri Walther & Gryl, 2019
- Bostryx lactifluus (Pfeiffer, 1856)
- Bostryx leucostictus (Philippi, 1856)
- Bostryx lichenorum (Orbigny, 1835)
- Bostryx mejillonensis (Pfeiffer, 1857)
- Bostryx metamorphus (Pilsbry, 1896)
- Bostryx philippii (Rehder, 1945)
- Bostryx pruinosus (Sowerby, 1833)
- Bostryx pumilio (Rehder, 1945)
- Bostryx pupiformis (Broderip, 1833)
- Bostryx pustulosus (Broderip, 1832)
- Bostryx rhodacme (Pfeiffer, 1843)
- Bostryx rouaulti (Hupé, 1854)
- Bostryx scabiosus (Sowerby, 1833)
- Bostryx valdovinosi (Araya, 2015)
- Bostryx variabilis Herm, 1970
- Bostryx voithianus (Pfeiffer, 1847)

Bothriembryontidae

genus Plectostylus - 12 species

- Plectostylus araucanus Valdovinos & Stuardo, 1988
- Plectostylus broderipii (Sowerby I, 1832)
- Plectostylus chilensis (Lesson, 1831)
- Plectostylus coquimbensis (Broderip, 1832)
- Plectostylus coturnix (Sowerby I, 1832)
- Plectostylus elegans (Pfeiffer, 1842)
- Plectostylus moestai (Dunker, 1864)
- Plectostylus ochsneri (Dunker, 1856)
- Plectostylus peruvianus (Bruguière, 1789)
- Plectostylus punctulifer (Sowerby I, 1833)
- Plectostylus reflexus (Pfeiffer, 1842)
- Plectostylus vagabondiae Brooks, 1936
- Plectostylus variegatus (Pfeiffer, 1842)

== Bivalvia ==
Hyriidae

• Diplodon chilensis (Gray, 1828)

• Diplodon solidulus (R. A. Philippi, 1869)

Sphaeriidae

• Sphaerium lauricochae (R. A. Philippi, 1869)

• Sphaerium forbesii (R. A. Philippi, 1869)

• Musculium argentinum (d'Orbigny, 1835)

• Musculium patagonicum (Pilsbry, 1911)

genus Pisidium - 7 species

• Pisidium chilense (d'Orbigny, 1846)

• Pisidium magellanicum (Dall, 1908)

• Pisidium lebruni (Mabille, 1884)

• Pisidium observationis (Pilsbry, 1911)

• Pisidium meierbrooki (Kuiper & Hinz, 1984)

• Pisidium huillichum (Ituarte, 1999)

• Pisidium llanquihuense (Ituarte, 1999)

== See also ==
- List of marine molluscs of Chile

Lists of molluscs of surrounding countries:

- List of non-marine molluscs of Peru, Wildlife of Peru
- List of non-marine molluscs of Bolivia, Wildlife of Bolivia
- List of non-marine molluscs of Argentina, Wildlife of Argentina
