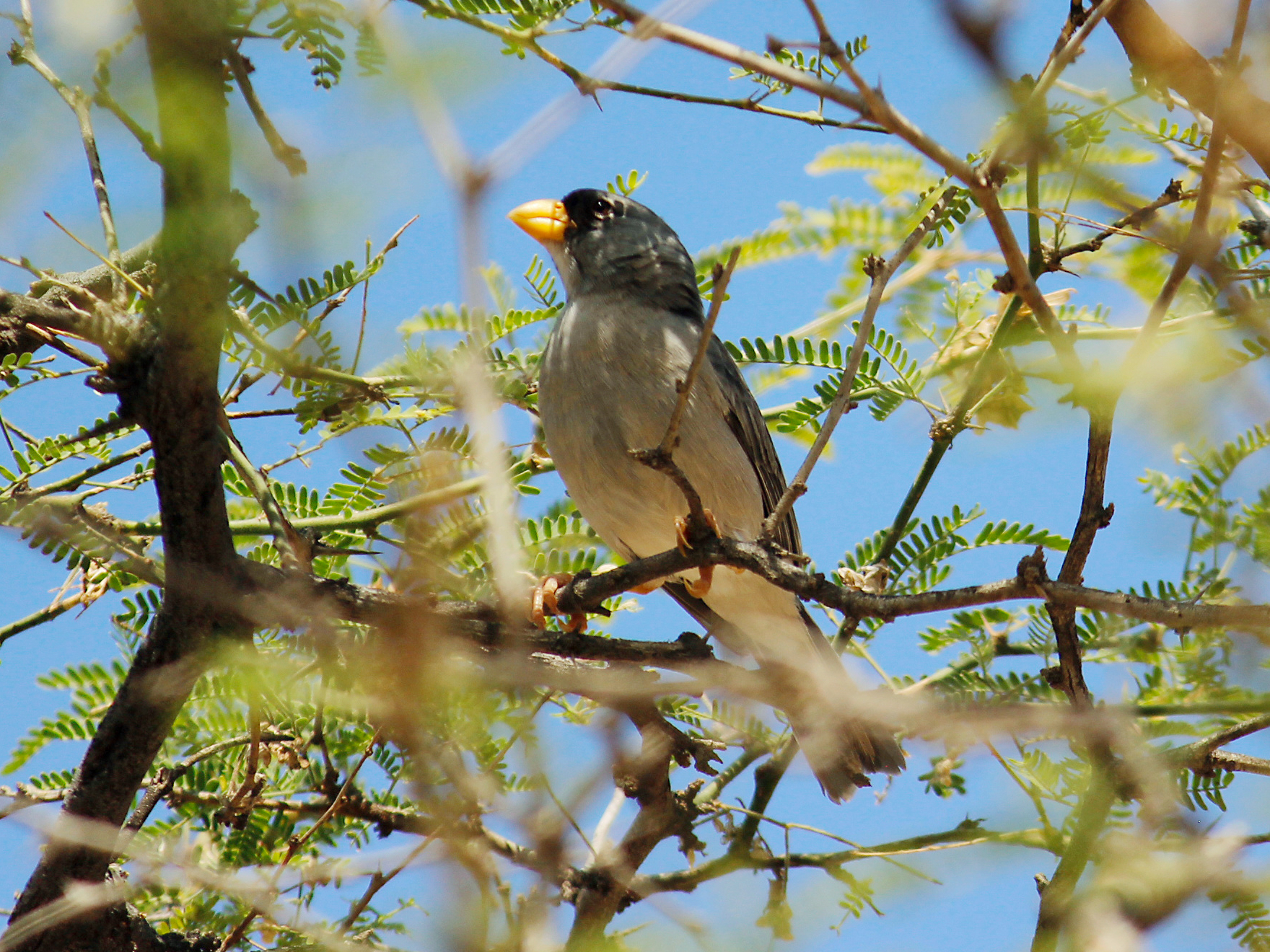
- In Contralmirante Villar province, Peru

Conservation status
- Least Concern (IUCN 3.1)

Scientific classification
- Kingdom: Animalia
- Phylum: Chordata
- Class: Aves
- Order: Passeriformes
- Family: Thraupidae
- Genus: Piezorina; Lafresnaye, 1843
- Species: P. cinerea

Binomial name
- Piezorina cinerea (Lafresnaye, 1843)

Synonyms
- Guiraca cinerea (protonym); Piezorhina cinerea

= Cinereous finch =

Species of bird

The cinereous finch (Piezorina cinerea) is a species of South American bird in the tanager family Thraupidae. It is the only member of the genus Piezorina. It is found in arid coastal regions of northern Peru, with a single record, presumably a straying bird, from immediately adjacent Ecuador.

== Taxonomy ==
The cinereous finch was formally described in 1843 by the French ornithologist Frédéric de Lafresnaye under the binomial name Guiraca cinerea. In the same publication he proposed a new genus Piezorina with the cinereous finch as the type species. Lafresnaye believed that his specimen had come from the Galápagos Islands, but it does not occur there and in 1930 the American ornithologist Outram Bangs amended the type location to northwest Peru. The genus name combines the Ancient Greek piezō meaning "to crush" with rhinos meaning "nose". The specific epithet cinerea is Latin and means "ash-grey" or "ash-coloured". The species is monotypic: no subspecies are recognised.

A molecular phylogenetic study of the tanagers published in 2014 found that the cinereous finch was a member of the subfamily Poospizinae and was closely related to the slender-billed finch (Xenospingus concolor).
