= Sickle barb =

Conservation status
- Least Concern (IUCN 3.1)

Scientific classification
- Kingdom: Animalia
- Phylum: Chordata
- Class: Actinopterygii
- Order: Cypriniformes
- Family: Cyprinidae
- Subfamily: Smiliogastrinae
- Genus: Enteromius
- Species: E. haasianus

Binomial name
- Enteromius haasianus L. R. David, 1936

Synonyms
- Barbus haasianus David, 1936

Species of fish

The sickle barb (Enteromius haasianus) is a species of ray-finned fish in the genus Enteromius. it gets its common name from the sickle shaped anal fin of mature males, they are normally a translucent brown colour with a spot on the caudal peduncle but in breeding condition the males take on a rosy hue. It is a common and widespread species of swamps and shallow waters, including floodplains, in central Africa from the Congo Basin to the Zambezi. It is harvested commercially for food and for the aquarium trade and in some areas, such as Katanga, pollution may be a threat but it is a common and widespread small fish and is not considered to be globally threatened.

== Size ==
This species reaches a length of 3.2 cm (1.3 in).

== Etymology ==
The fish is named in honor malacologist Fritz Haas (1886-1969), who collected the type specimen.
