= Wildlife of Chile =

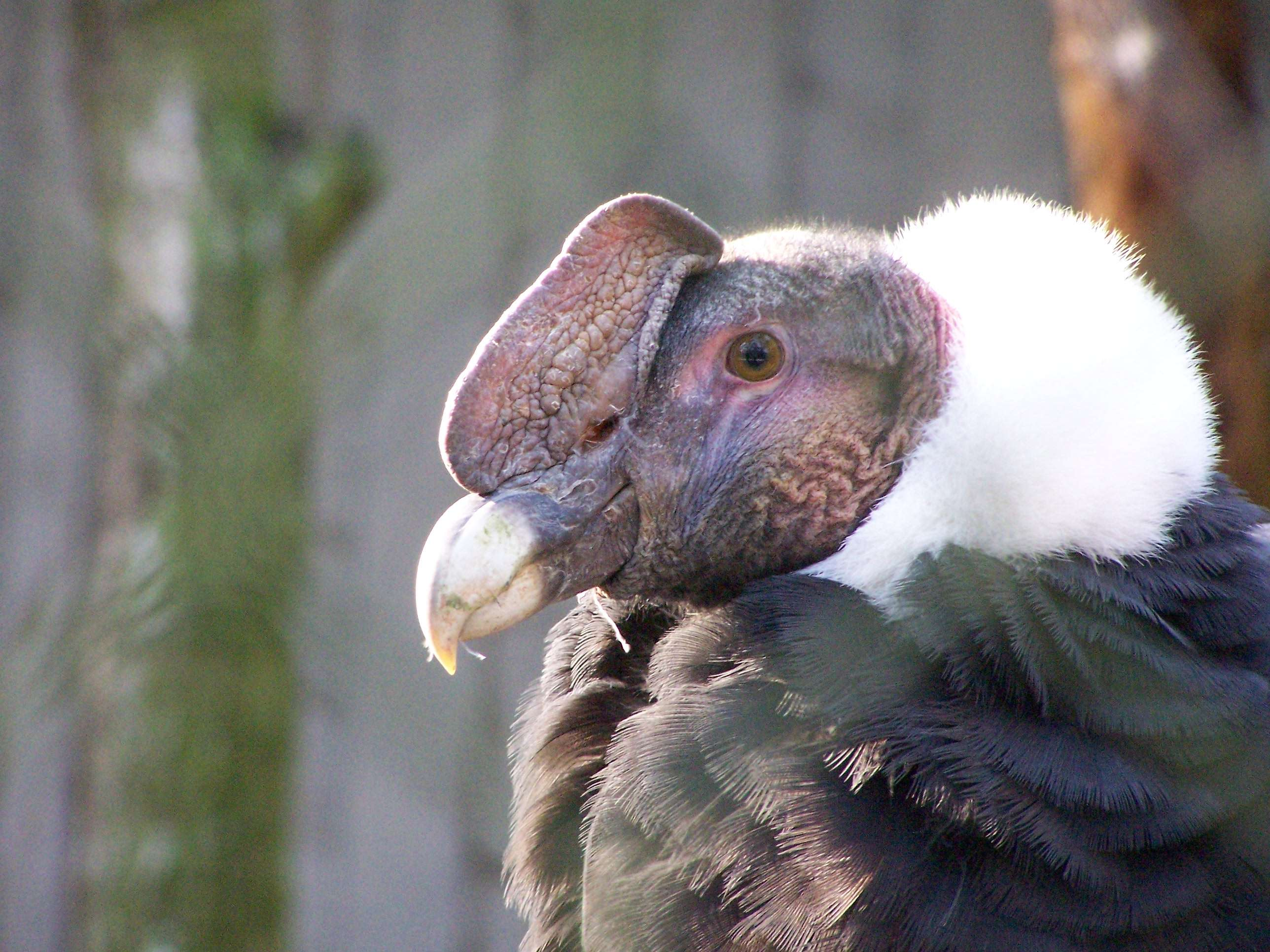
Andean condor (Vultur gryphus) (NT) is the national bird of Chile

The wildlife of Chile is very diverse because of the country's slender and elongated shape, which spans a wide range of latitude, and altitude, ranging from the windswept coastline of the Pacific coast on the west to northern Andes to the sub-Antarctic, high Andes mountains in the east. There are many distinct ecosystems.

Chile, often called "the spine of South America", has 100 protected areas covering a total area of 14.5 million hectares (20% of the country) in 36 national parks, 49 national reserves, and 15 national monuments. In the southern part of Chile, 50% of the flora (part of temperate rain forest called the Valdivian forests) is endemic, which is a unique feature in the world. Lapageria rosea (Chilean bellflower) is the national flower, the Andean condor, (Vultur gryphus) (NT) is the national bird, and the South Andean huemul (Hippocamelus bisulcus), is the national animal of Chile. Legally, wildlife in Chile is res nullius (ownerless property).

== Geography ==
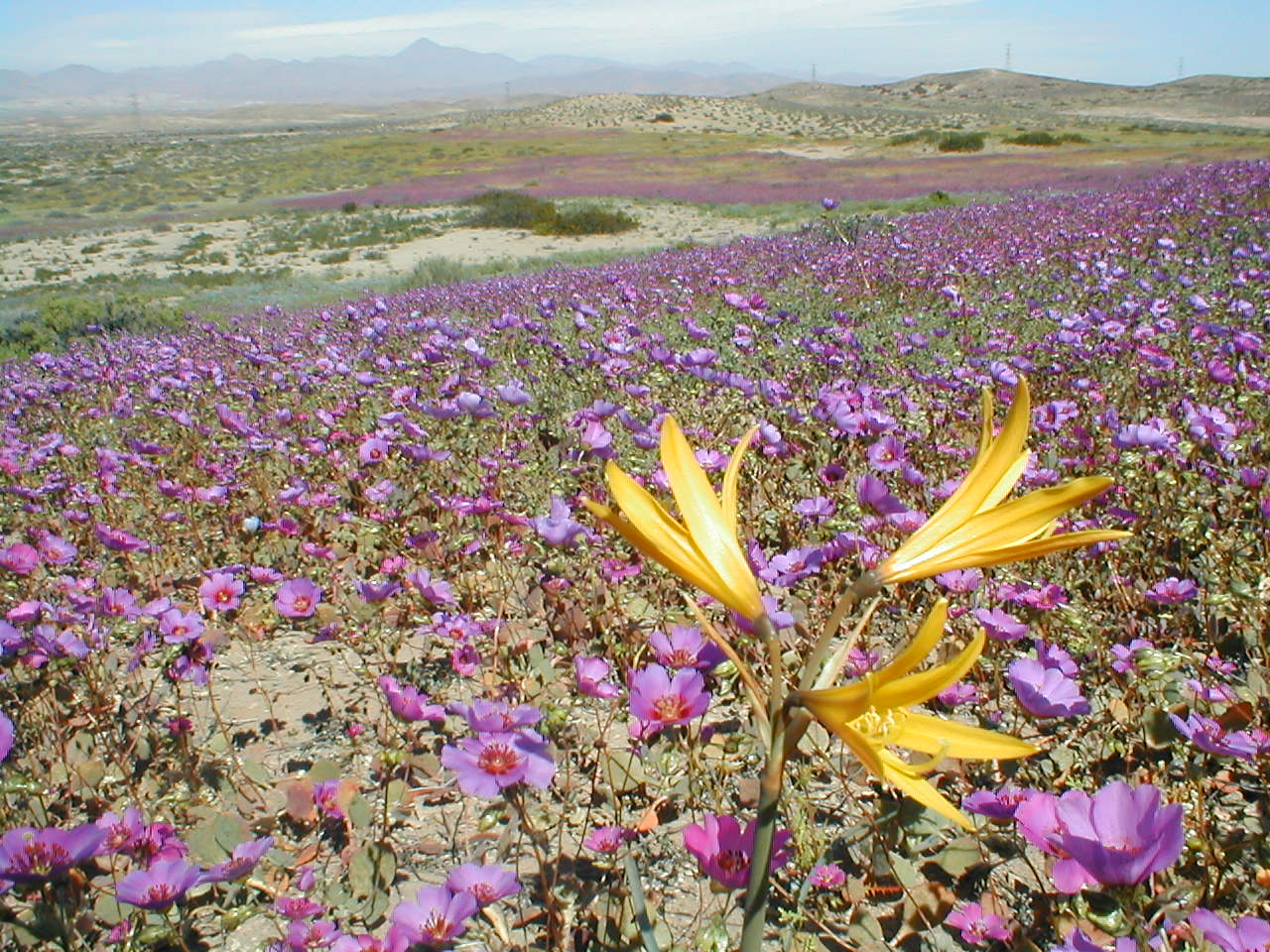
Atacama Desert

From the wildlife angle, Chile in Southern South America stretches in a north–south direction, called the spine of South America, has terrestrial borders with Argentina and Peru, and has long coast line of 6,435 km (3,999 miles) on the South Pacific Ocean. The Atacama Desert is the most arid desert in the world. The Ojos del Salado, a crater lake which is the world's highest lake, at 6,390 metres (20,960 ft), is located here.

== Climate ==
In northern Chile there is the harsh Atacama Desert with typical desert wildlife such as cacti. In the country's central region, there is a temperate Mediterranean climate, while the south has cold and moist mountainous regions and numerous islands.

== Enabling laws ==
The first law addressing the capture and use of wild animals was contained in the Civil Code of 1888. Chile has brought nearly 20% of its terrestrial area under conservation protection laws and 3.19% of its marine jurisdiction is also under protection. The first national park was created in 1925 following an earlier protected area created in 1907. But it was the Ley de Bosques (1931) which permitted the establishment of NP, reserves and natural monuments. Since then several agencies both government (at the central and regional level) and private agencies have been involved in biodiversity conservation and preservation. Until 1984, the conservation actions of creation and management of protected areas was with the Agriculture and Livestock Service (SAG), a government body. In 1970, the Chilean Forest Service (CONAF) was given the responsibility to create and manage protected areas. A centralized system for preservation of the biodiversity of Chile was, however, created in 1984 only, under the Decree Law 18,362 which specified the creation of protected areas as "the continuity of evolutionary processes, animal migrations, genetic flow patterns and the regulation of the environment". Under this decree a national public system titled Sistema Nacional deÁreas Silvestres Protegidas (SNASPE) was established and charged with the task of setting up parks and reserves under set guidelines for management and conservation. The SNASPE followed the IUCN guidelines to set up protected areas under four categories of Virgin Regional Reserves, National Parks, Natural Monuments, and National Reserves. Complementing the actions of SNAPE are initiatives taken by private agencies to protect specific areas. Both actions are tended towards ecotourism. As biodiversity outside the limits of the protected areas is equally important, proposals have been mooted to promote this activity.

The Regions of Chile

Laws regulating exploitation of wildlife are in force since 1888 which have been improved upon since the 1990s, with regulations of 1993 being the most recent and stringent. This has resulted in almost total check over hunting and commercialization of vertebrates, except for exploitation of bird species, two deer (introduced), vertebrate pests, and the inducted lagomorphs species of European hare (Lepus timidus) and European rabbit (Oryctolagus cuniculus).

While the laws have provided protection to reptiles and amphibians, animals with fur cover and game species of both birds and mammals are exploited to a reasonable level. However, cross border illegal traffic still persists and Chile acts as a conduit for illegal trafficking in animals from other South American countries and the law enforcement in this regard is lax.

== Protected areas ==
With respect to conservation of flora and fauna, the protected areas are identified in the country's 15 administrative regions, plus the Metropolitan area and the Metro de Santiago, which are listed in alphabetical order (each region's serial number—based on information sourced to Corporación Nacional Forestal (CONAF)— appears in parentheses):

- Aysén del General Carlos Ibáñez del Campo (XI)
- Antofagasta (II)
- Araucanía (IX)
- Arica y Parinacota (XV)
- Atacama (III)
- Bío Bío (VIII)
- Coquimbo (IV)
- Libertador Bernardo O'Higgins (VI)
- Los Lagos (X)
- Los Ríos (XIV)
- Santiago Metro
- Magallanes y la Antártica Chilena (XII)
- Maule (VII)
- Metropolitana (R.M.)
- Tarapacá (I)
- Valparaíso (V)

There are 100 protected areas in the above listed regions covering an area of 14.5 million hectares (20% of the country) in 36 national parks, 49 national reserves, and 15 national monuments. The national monuments account for 0.01% of the area.

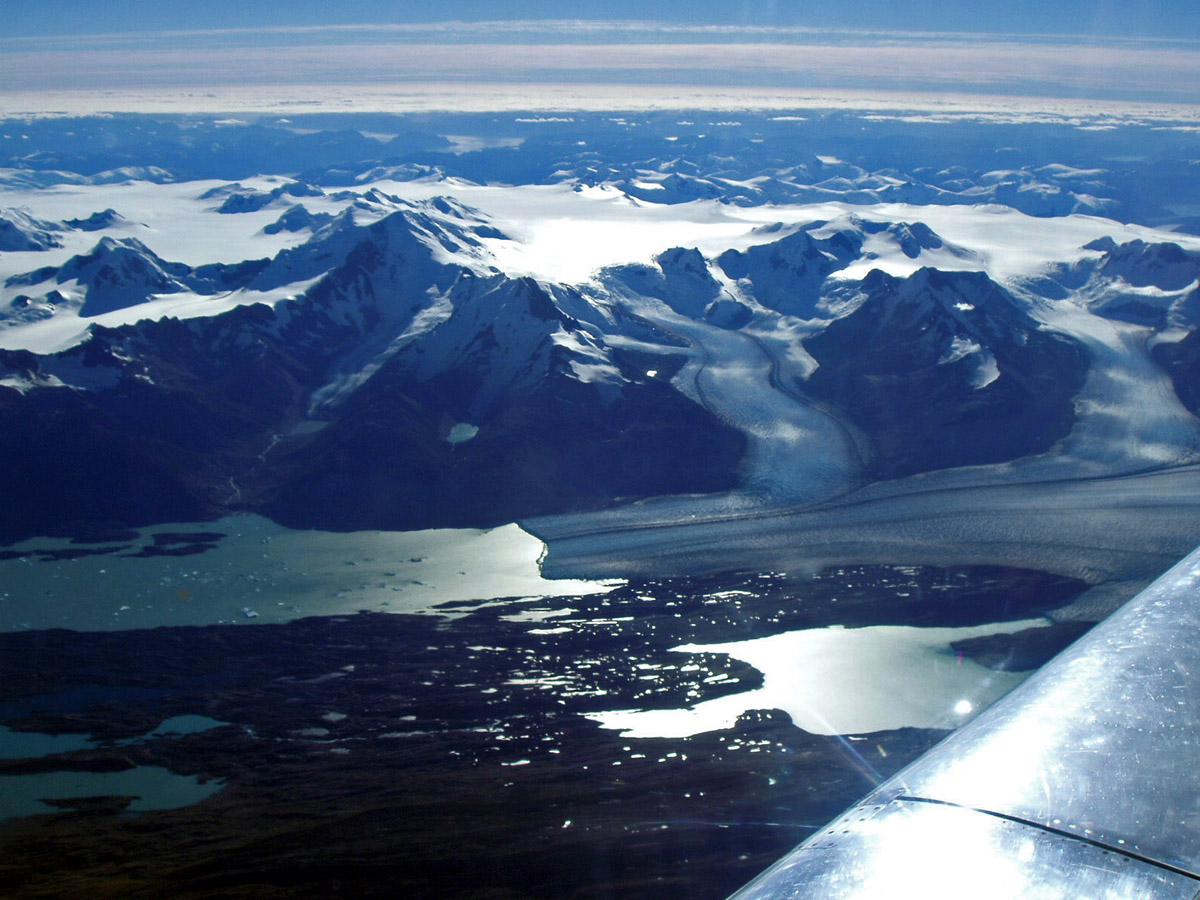
Bernardo O'Higgins National Park on the Chile-Argentina border

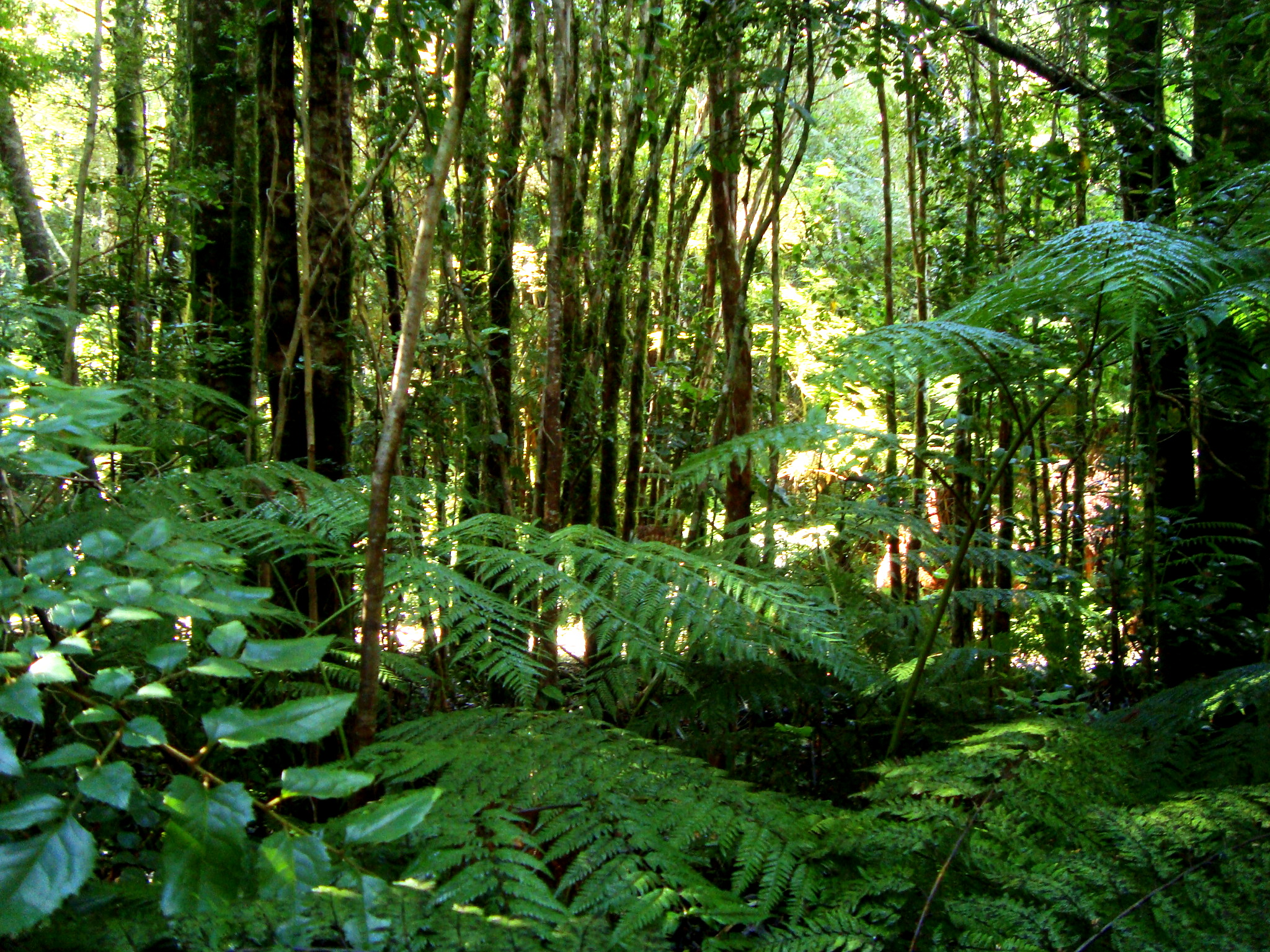
Valdivian temperate rain forest in Oncol Park in Provincia de Valdivia

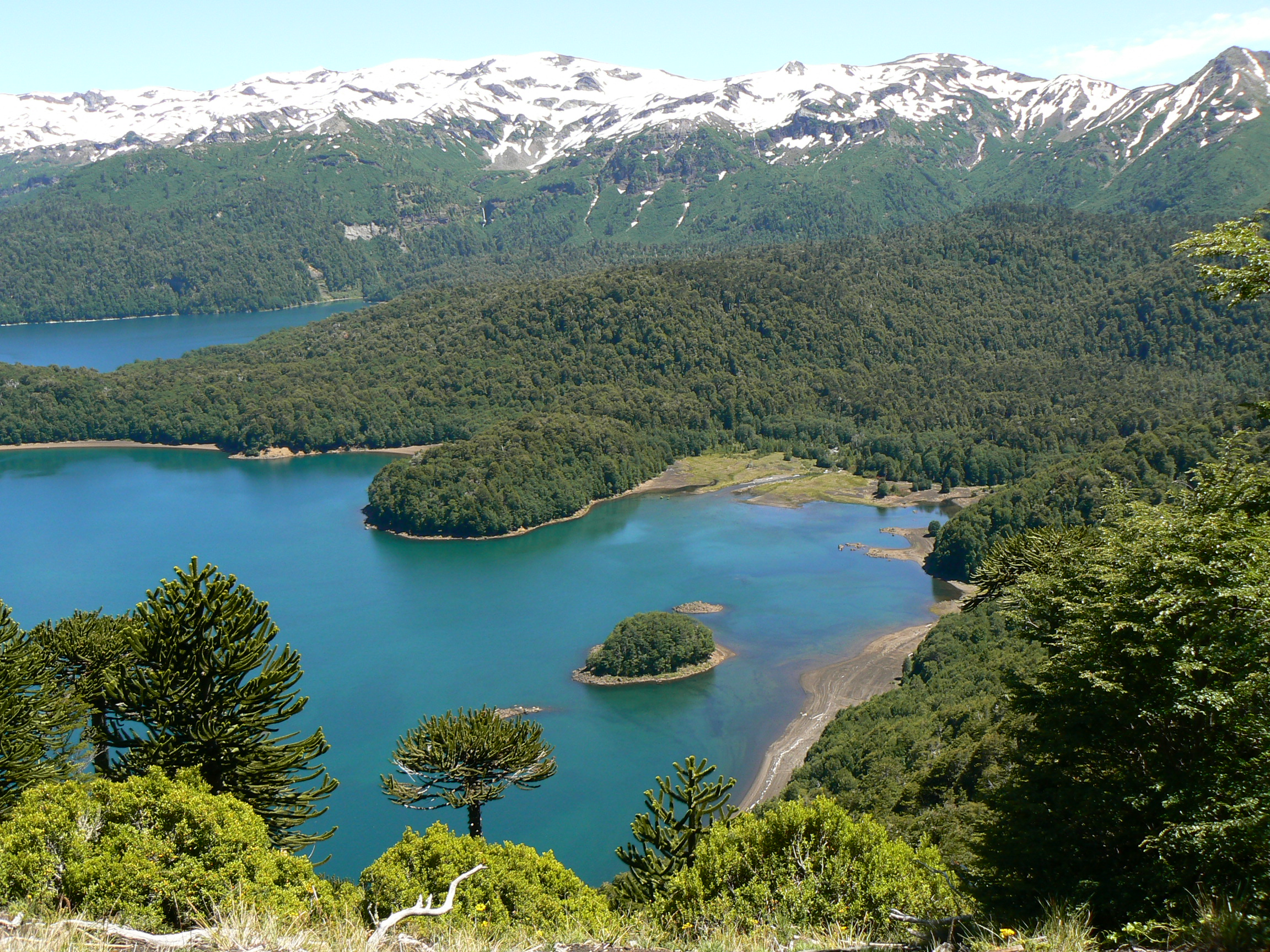
Looking out over Lago Conguillío, Conguillío National Park, Chile

In terms of world statistics of area covered under protection, Chile has the second place in Latin America and seventh place in the world. However, the distribution of the protected area in the country is highly uneven with two of the 15 administrative regions garnering 84% of the protected area, and with the southern regions XI and XII having the major share of about 50% of the total area which adjoins the forest and protected areas of the Argentinian Andes of Patagonia. In the remaining regions, the protected area covered is only 4.4% of total area which is less than the accepted international norm of 5%. The protected areas are also governed by the "ice and rock" criterion adopted in the United States Wilderness System. Under this criterion, about 23% of the total area of SNASPE is covered by ice fields and other land types which have no vegetation and least habitation. Apart from the 100 terrestrial protected areas which also partly include some marine areas, now 75 new critical bird areas of marine birdlife have been identified by BirdLife International. The Important Bird Areas (IBA) cover the "cliffs of Arica, the bays of Coquimbo, Mejillones, the mouths of Biobío and Maipu rivers, the Alejandro Selkirk islands, Choros, Damas, Punta de Choros, and Parque Nacional Cabo de Hornos."

== Flora ==
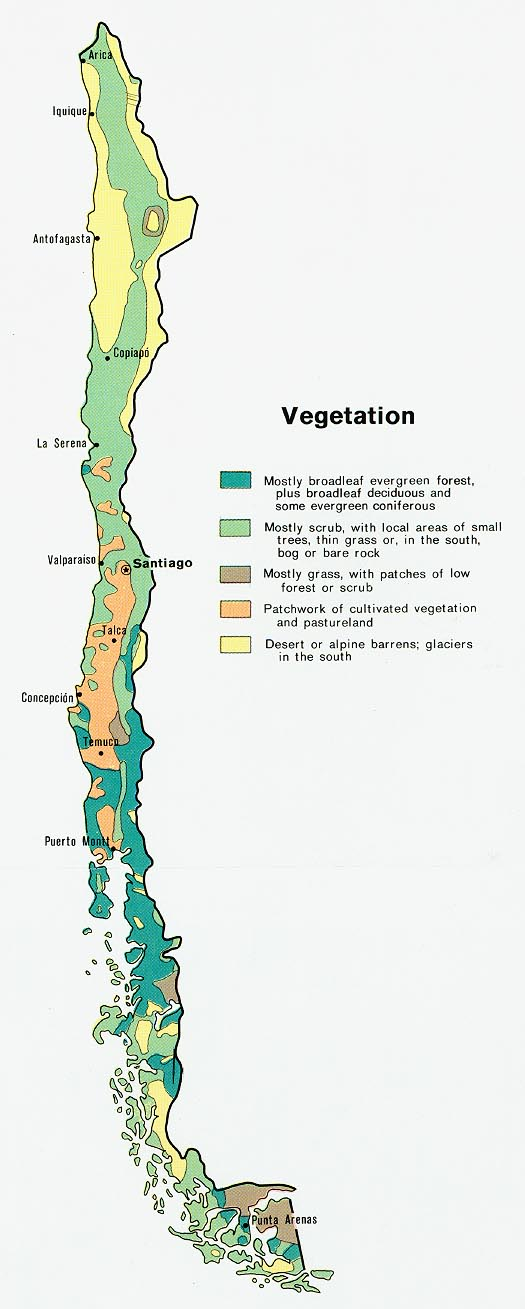
Vegetation zones

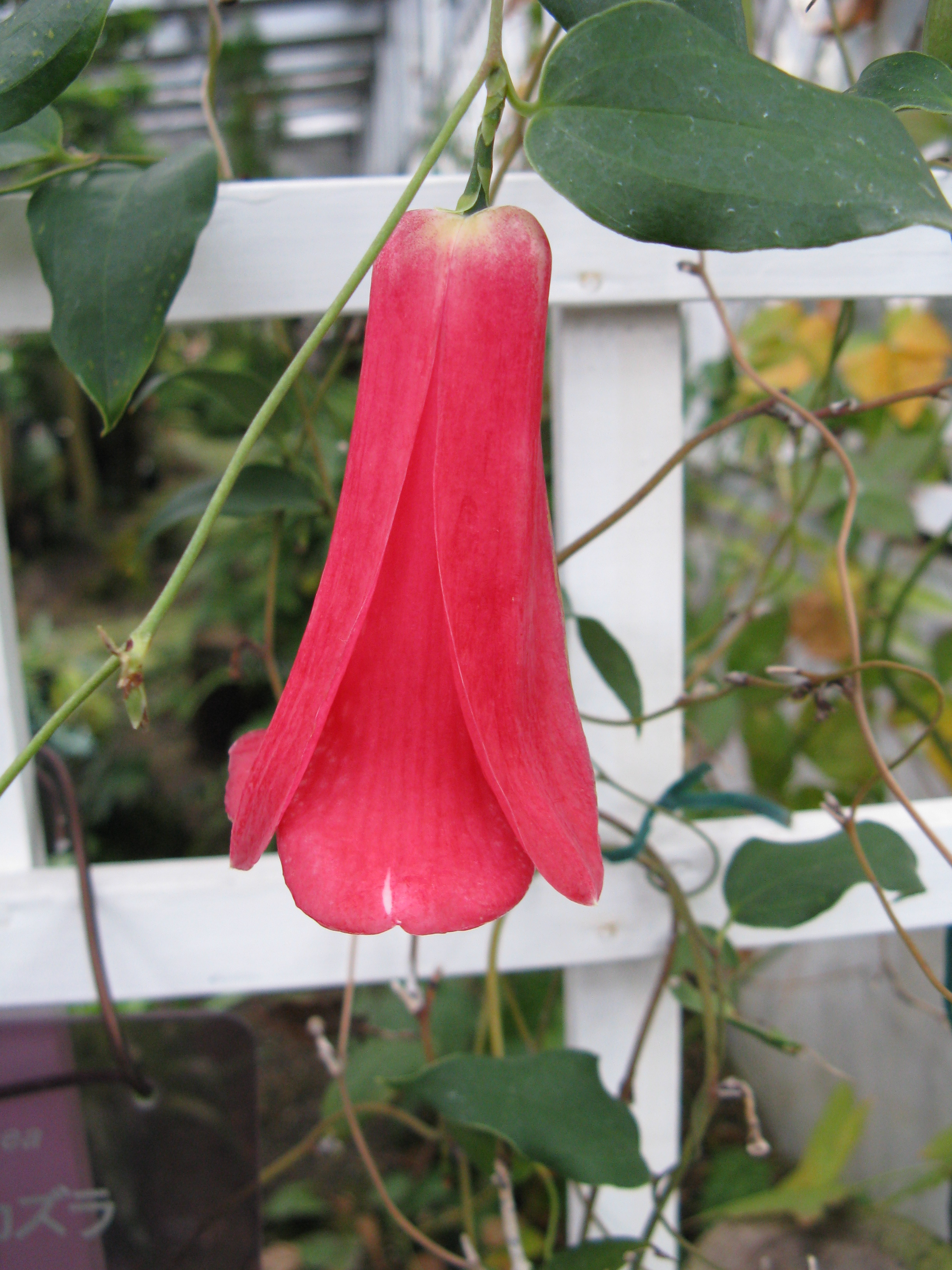
Lapageria rosea (Chilean bellflower), the national flower

The country's flora is composed of 56 orders, 181 families, 837 genera, and about 4,295 species with large numbers in terms of genera and species from the families Asteraceae, Poaceae, Fabaceae, and Solanaceae. The land is divided into latitudinal sections which dictate the country's vegetation; soil conditions and climatic conditions are key factors in this respect. In the sandy northern desert region (the Atacama Desert, the driest place on Earth) there is no precipitation at all but the area still sustains not only vegetation but also fauna; the coastal fogs rising from the nearby Pacific sustain them. The desert vegetation consists of a spiny acacia tree, varieties of cacti as well as shrubs and spiny brambles. In the high plateau area of northern Chile, the most common flora are llareta and grasses of ichu and tola varieties. In the semiarid region of central Chile, cacti, espino and algarrobo hardwood, and Adesmia shrubs are the notable flora. In the humid and temperate region of central Chile, vegetation is defined by the term matorral which consists of thick growth of hardwoods, shrubs, cacti, and green grass; however the vegetation is thinning due to heavy anthropogenic pressure on land. South of the Biobío River, mixed deciduous forest and evergreen trees are the common vegetation types; local species include rauli or southern cedar, the roble beech, the ulmo (an evergreen shrub), and the evergreen laurel. The vegetation types on the western slopes of the Andes are formed of thick forests of monkey puzzle tree (Chile pine). The Chilean Lake District has dense rain forests of timber species. South of this area, the dominant vegetation consists of Antarctic beech, the Chilean cedar, and the giant alerce (one specimen in southern Chile was reported to be 3000 years old and the "second largest living organism in the world"). In Chilean Patagonia and Tierra del Fuego's main island, due to weather conditions only dwarf varieties of southern beech and hard grasses are found.

Pristine floral sub-Antarctic forest vegetation (including deciduous lenga forests, peat bogs, Andean meadows) is found in Tierra del Fuego. In the southern part of Chile, part of which is the Bernardo O'Higgins National Park, Chile's largest protected area, 50% of the flora (part of the temperate rain forest called the Valdivian forests) is endemic.

Lapageria rosea (Chilean bellflower), a twining climber, is the national flower of Chile.

== Fauna ==
=== Mammals ===
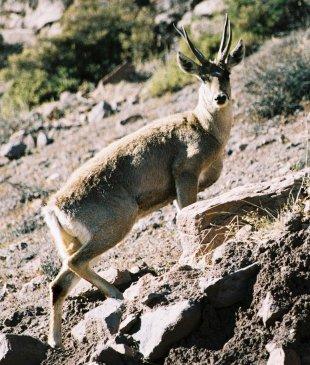
Taruca or North Andean huemul, national animal

In view of its geographic setting with formidable High Andes mountain on its eastern border and the arid deserts of north, deterring movement from its neighbouring countries, the terrestrial mammals species in Chile are limited to 103, out of a total mammal species count of about 148. The land mammals are mostly nocturnal and avoid human contact. National parks, which provide protection to the mammals, are the most likely locations where these animals can be seen. There are 18 endemic mammal species. Marine mammals (such as whales, otters, sea lions, dolphins) and birds are quite easily seen along the long coastline in the Pacific Ocean to the west of the country. Of the more than 600 vertebrate species in the country, only two dozen are considered to be exotic. Notable mammal species include guanacos (a form of the wild llama), feral minks, armadillos, culpeo, and opossums. Species reported in Southern Chile are pudú (world's smallest deer), and the opossum-like monito del monte, which is a living fossil. The Patagonian puma, called mountain lion or cougar in North America, is found throughout Chile and its population (once hunted indiscriminately) has been helped by protection provided by the government.

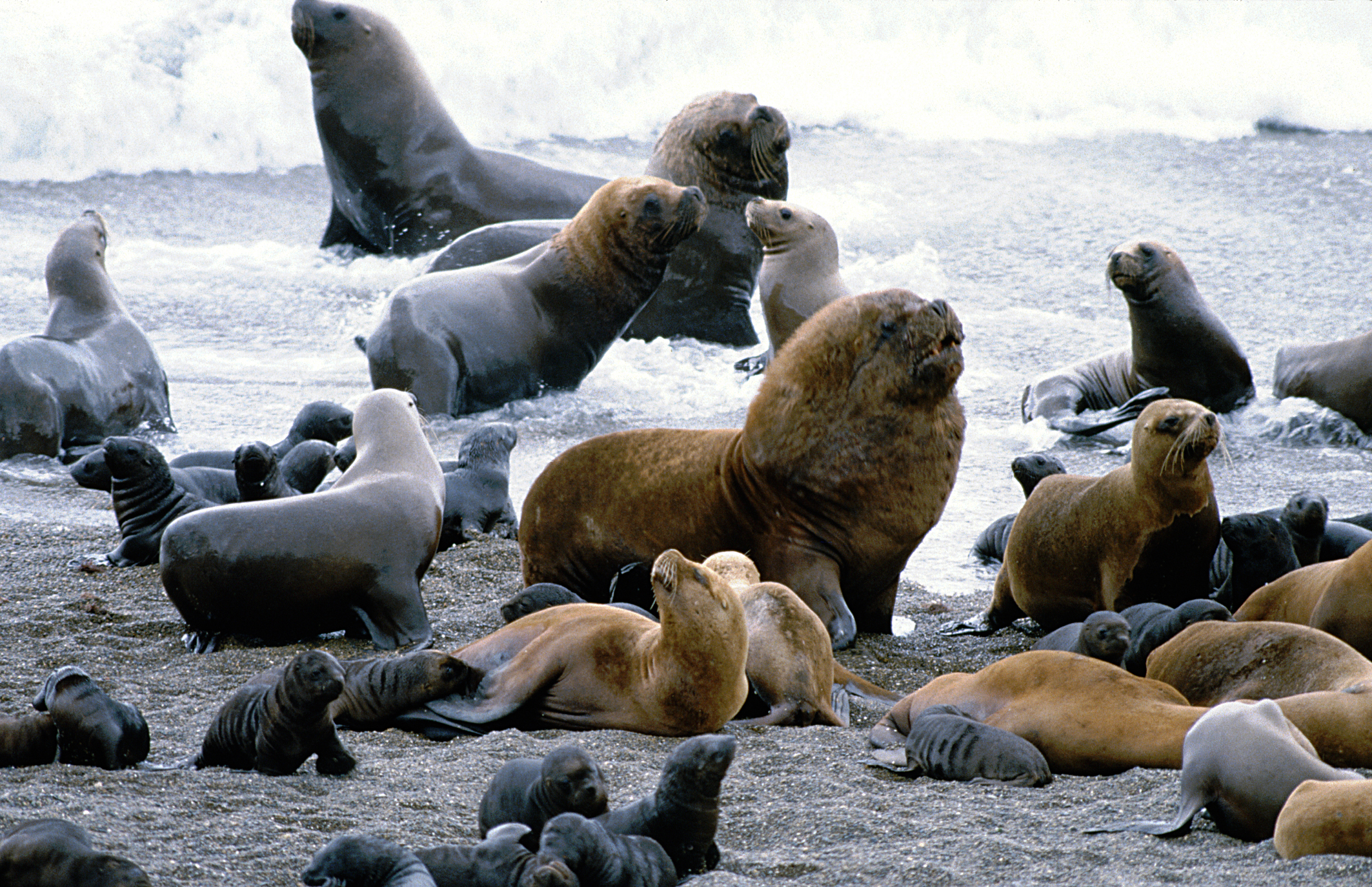
Sea lions

Native marine mammals include elephant seals and sea lions. Blue whales (in the Gulf of Corcovado) (the largest mammal in the world), humpback, sei and sperm whales, sea otters, and dolphin species are also reported.

=== Birds ===
The national bird of Chile is the Andean condor The total avifauna species in Chile as reported by BirdLife International, as of 2012, number 530, including 14 endemic species (two breeding in Chile), 37 globally threatened species, and 7 introduced species. The globally endangered, endemic and introduced species are as follows:

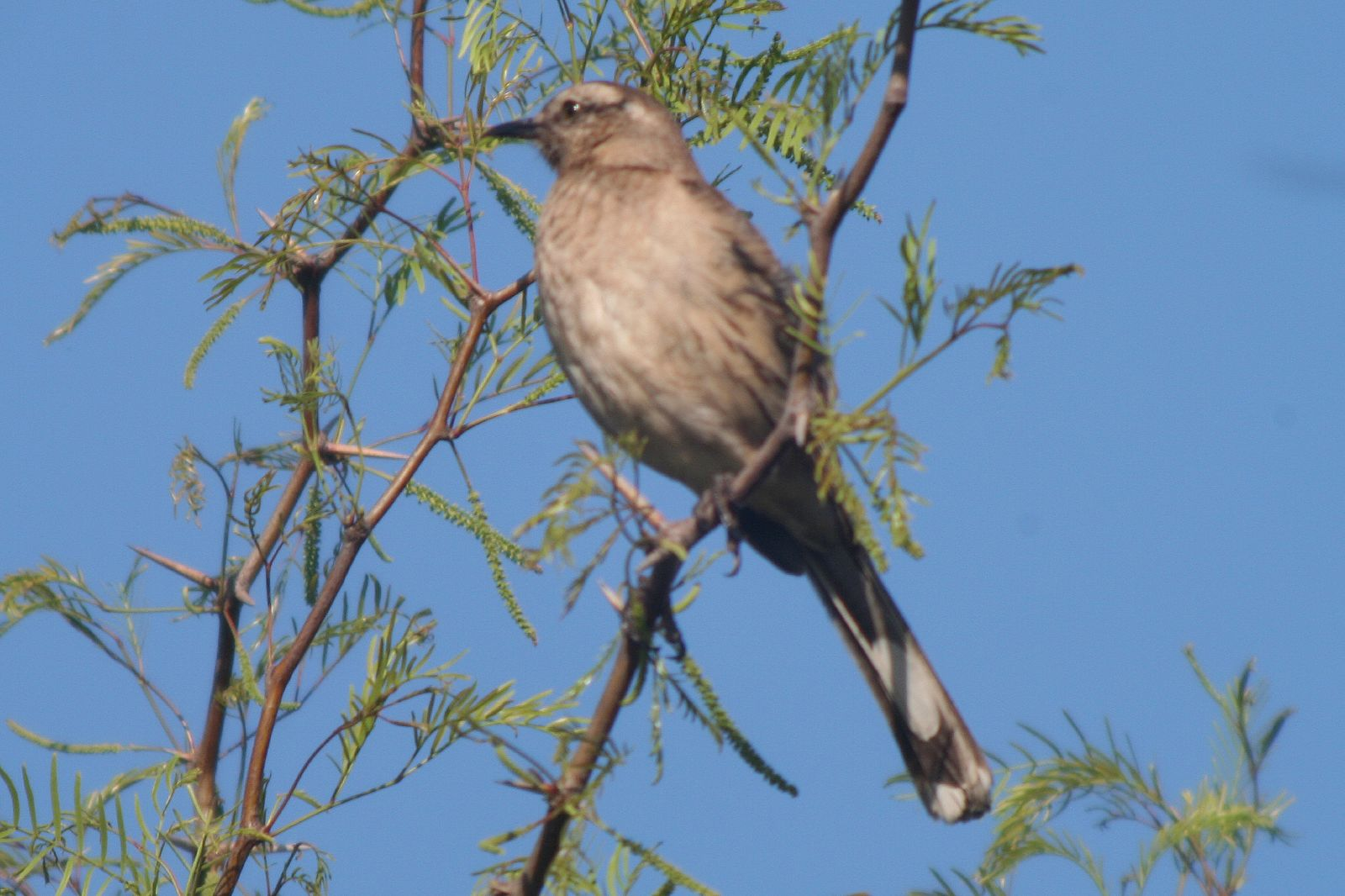
Chilean mockingbird (Mimus thenca)

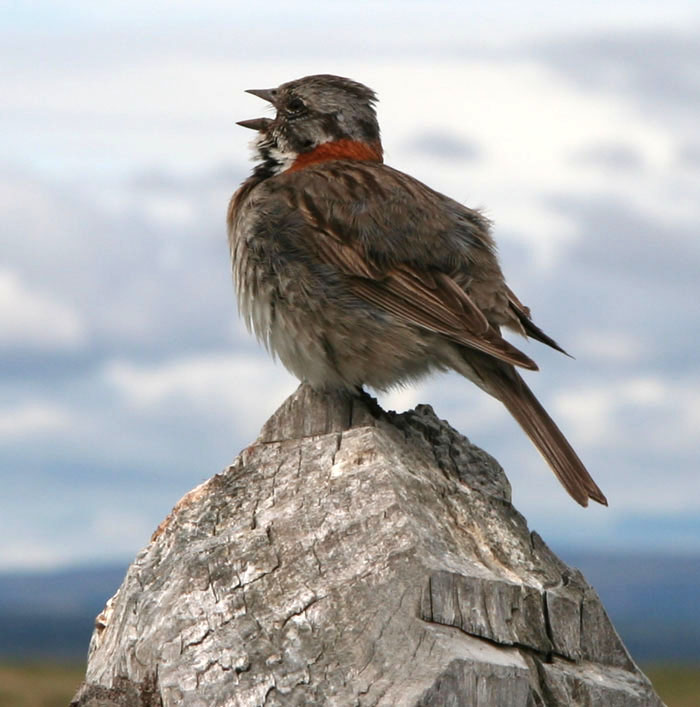
Rufous-collared sparrow (Zonotrichia capensis)

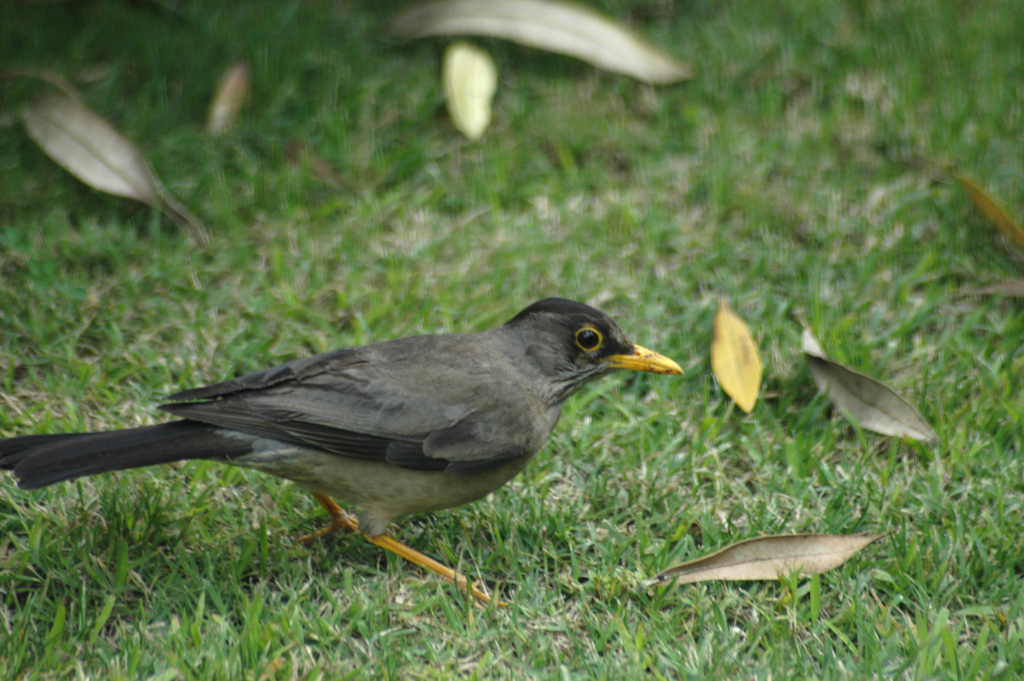
Austral thrush (Turdus falcklandii magellanicus)

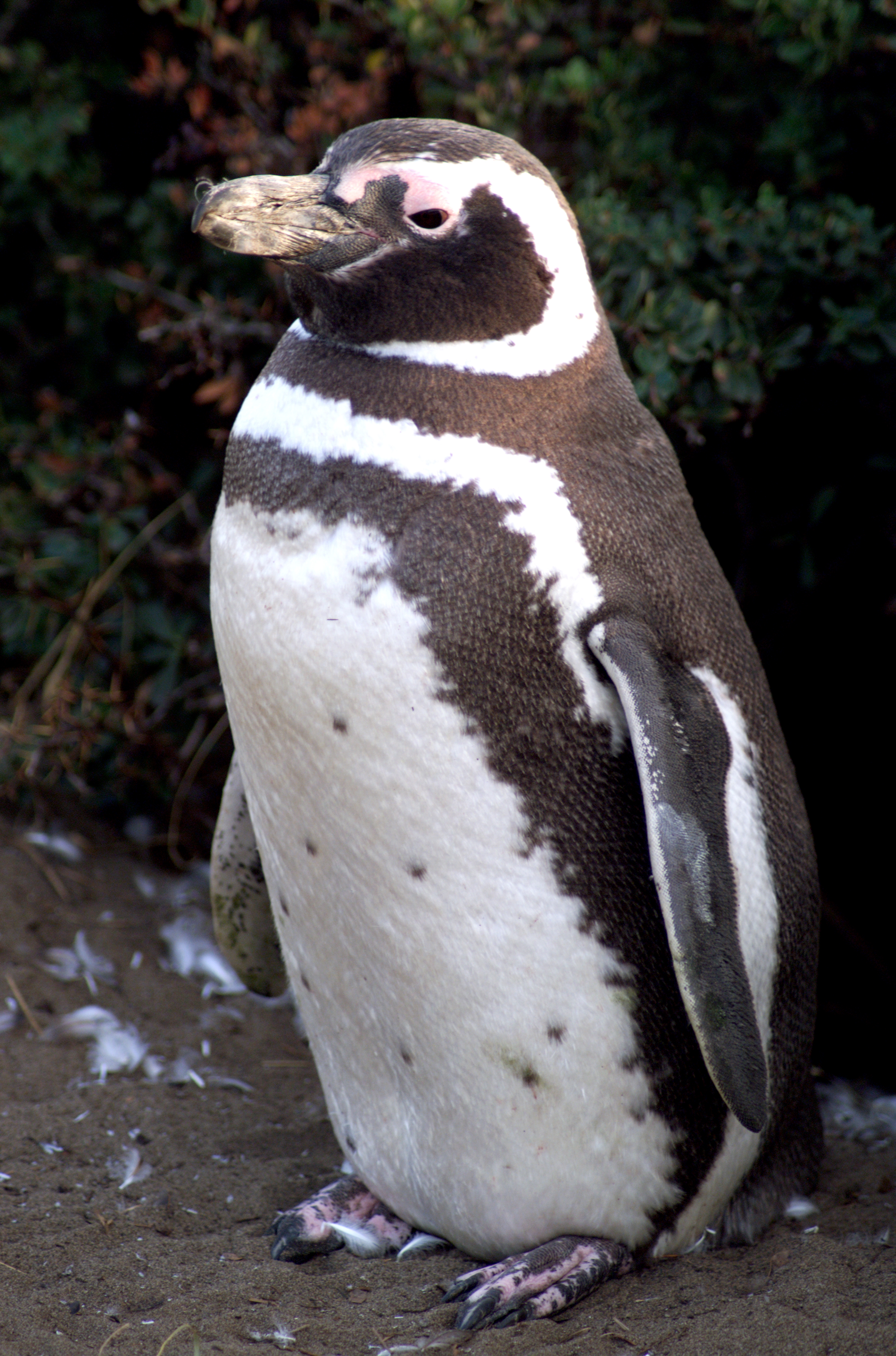
Magellanic penguin (Spheniscus magellanicus), breeds in colonies in the south.

Critically endangered

- Podiceps gallardoi (hooded grebe)
- Phoebastria irrorata (waved albatross)
- Pterodroma magentae (magenta petrel)
- Pterodroma phaeopygia (Galapagos petrel)
- Numenius borealis (Eskimo curlew) may be extinct

Endangered

- Phoebetria fusca (sooty albatross)
- Pterodroma atrata (Henderson petrel)
- Pterodroma alba (Phoenix petrel)
- Nesofregetta fuliginosa (Polynesian storm-petrel)
- Pelecanoides garnotii (Peruvian diving-petrel)
- Poikilocarbo gaimardi (red-legged cormorant)
- Phalacrocorax bougainvillii (Magellan cormorant)
- Sternula lorata (Peruvian tern)

Near threatened

- Rhea pennata (lesser rhea)
- Speculanas specularis (spectacled duck)
- Phoenicopterus chilensis (Chilean flamingo)
- Phoenicoparrus jamesi (James's flamingo)
- Aptenodytes forsteri (emperor penguin)
- Pygoscelis adeliae (Adelie penguin)
- Pygoscelis papua (gentoo penguin)
- Spheniscus magellanicus (Magellanic penguin)
- Thalassarche bulleri (Buller's albatross)
- Phoebetria palpebrata (light-mantled albatross)
- Pterodroma ultima (Murphy's petrel)
- Pterodroma inexpectata (mottled petrel)
- Procellaria cinerea (gray petrel)
- Puffinus griseus (sooty shearwater)
- Pelecanus thagus (Peruvian pelican)
- Vultur gryphus (Andean condor)
- Buteo ventralis (rufous-tailed hawk)
- Fulica cornuta (horned coot)
- Phegornis mitchellii (diademed sandpiper-plover)
- Pluvianellus socialis (Magellanic plover)
- Calidris pusilla (semipalmated sandpiper)
- Tryngites subruficollis (buff-breasted sandpiper)
- Gallinago stricklandii (Fuegian snipe)
- Larosterna inca (Inca tern)
- Thalasseus elegans (elegant tern)
- Chaetura pelagica (chimney swift)
- Phalcoboenus australis (striated caracara)
- Falco deiroleucus (orange-breasted falcon)
- Aratinga erythrogenys (red-masked parakeet)
- Anairetes fernandezianus (Juan Fernandez tit-tyrant)
- Oreomanes fraseri (giant conebill)
- Xenospingus concolor (slender-billed finch)

Vulnerable

- Tachyeres leucocephalus (white-headed steamer-duck)
- Phoenicoparrus andinus (Andean flamingo)
- Spheniscus humboldti (Humboldt penguin)
- Eudyptes chrysolophus (macaroni penguin)
- Eudyptes schlegeli (royal penguin)
- Thalassarche chrysostoma (gray-headed albatross)
- Thalassarche salvini (Salvin's albatross)
- Thalassarche eremita (Chatham albatross)
- Pterodroma externa (Juan Fernandez petrel)
- Pterodroma cookii (Cook's petrel)
- Pterodroma defilippiana (Masatierra petrel)
- Procellaria aequinoctialis (white-chinned petrel)
- Procellaria parkinsoni (Parkinson's petrel)
- Procellaria westlandica (Westland petrel)
- Puffinus creatopus (pink-footed shearwater)
- Puffinus bulleri (Buller's shearwater)
- Rallus antarcticus (austral rail)
- Numenius phaeopus or N. p. hudsonicus (whimbrel or Hudsonian curlew)
- Agriornis albicauda (white-tailed shrike-tyrant)
- Progne murphyi (southern martin)
- Conirostrum tamarugense (tamarugo conebill)

Endemic

- Nothoprocta perdicaria (ornate tinamou)
- Pterodroma longirostris (Stejneger's petrel) breeding type (V)
- Eulidia yarrellii (Chilean woodstar) (EN)
- Enicognathus leptorhynchus (slender-billed parakeet)
- Pteroptochos castaneus (chestnut-throated huet-huet)
- Pteroptochos megapodius (moustached turca)
- Scelorchilus albicollis (white-throated tapaculo)
- Scytalopus fuscus (dusky tapaculo)
- Aphrastura masafuerae (Mas Afuera rayadito) (CR)
- Sephanoides fernandensis (Juan Fernandez firecrown) (CR)
- Mimus thenca (Chilean mockingbird)

=== Non-marine molluscs ===
A number of species of non-marine molluscs are found in the wild in Chile. Native Orthalicidae include 29 species of genus Bostryx and 12 species of genus Plectostylus.

=== Marine molluscs ===
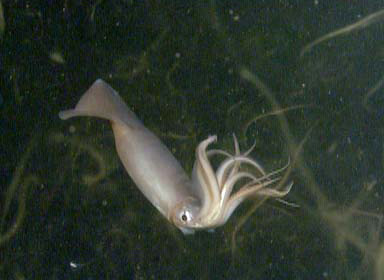
Humboldt squid (Dosidicus gigas)

The marine molluscs of Chile number 1070 species, including gastropods such as limpets, snails and sea slugs; bivalves such as clams, oysters, mussels and scallops; and cephalopods such as octopuses, squids and cuttlefish.

== Threats ==
There are many reasons for the decline of fauna and flora in Chile. These generally relate to encroachment of land for agriculture and mining (widespread deforestation), hunting for felt, food and trade of animals, and attack by other animals and birds. It is reported that nearly 33% of the mammals species face threat of extinction.

In the marine area, the threats posed are from industrial fishing (salmon farming and cultured mussels) and aquaculture particularly in the Gulf of Corcovado, intensive exploitation of marine resources, with large maritime traffic of trawls, associated fishing.

== Conservation ==
In this context of mammals species in Central Chile, a highly populated region, is of conservation concern. Even in the arid areas of northern Chile, the concern for conservation is essential. Chilean authorities, with international assistance, have made progress in addressing these problems but much remains to be done that will require continued international assistance if many unique forms are to be preserved.

Conservation of wildlife is achieved through protected areas set up and managed by both the government organizations such as the SNAPPE and its implementation wing the CONAF, and also through private initiatives. Commercial exploitation is controlled by the Convention on International Trade in Endangered Species (CITES) of IUCN to which Chile is a signatory and CITES Annexure II gives the list of endangered species. International assistance has contributed richly in this activity.

As part of conservation of its wildlife, Chile is signatory (but not ratified) to the international agreements, protocols, conventions and laws such as the Antarctic-Environmental Protocol, Convention for the Conservation of Antarctic Marine Living Resources, Antarctic Treaty, Climate Change-Kyoto Protocol, Law of the Sea, Environmental Modification Convention, Montreal Protocol for ozone layer protection, Antarctic seals, biodiversity, climate change, desertification, endangered species, hazardous wastes, marine dumping, ship pollution, wetlands, and whaling.

== Gallery ==
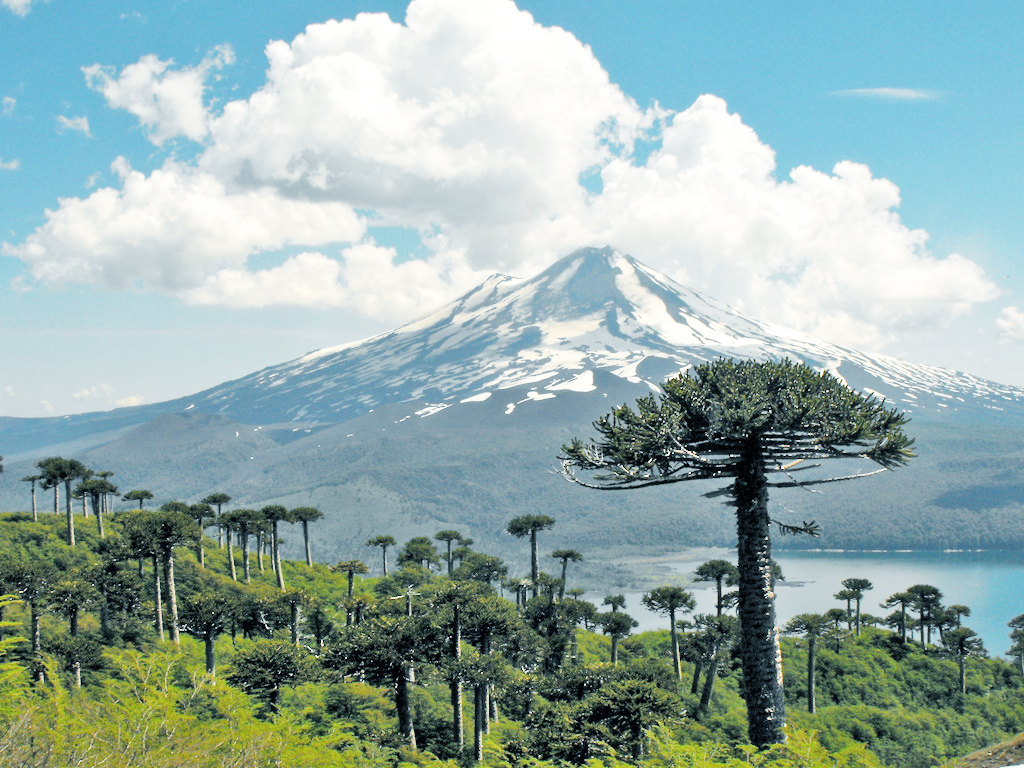
Araucaria araucana trees in Conguillío National Park

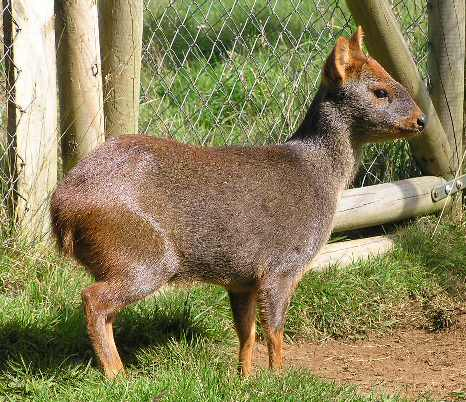
Pudú in Chile

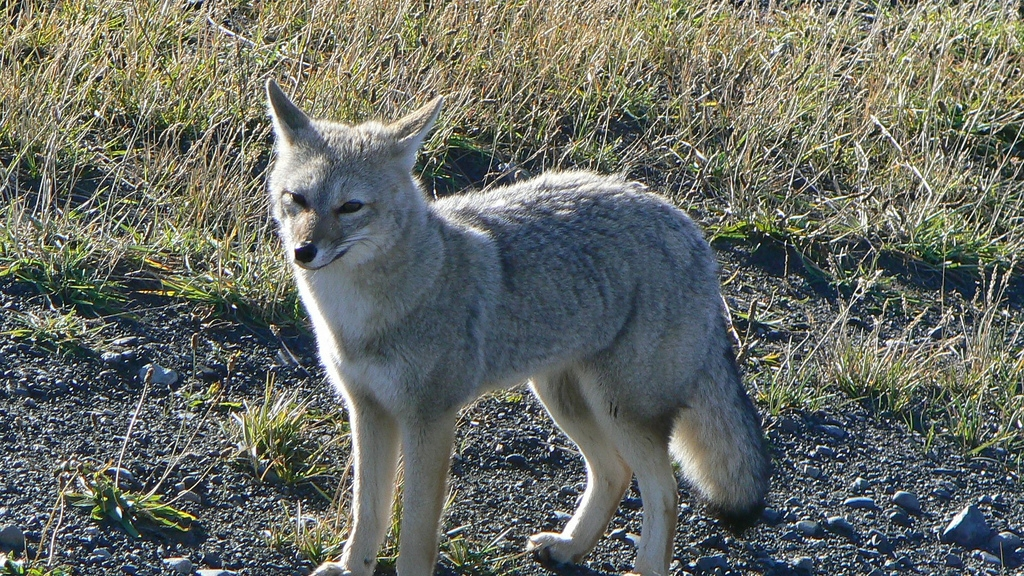
Chilla fox, common in the region

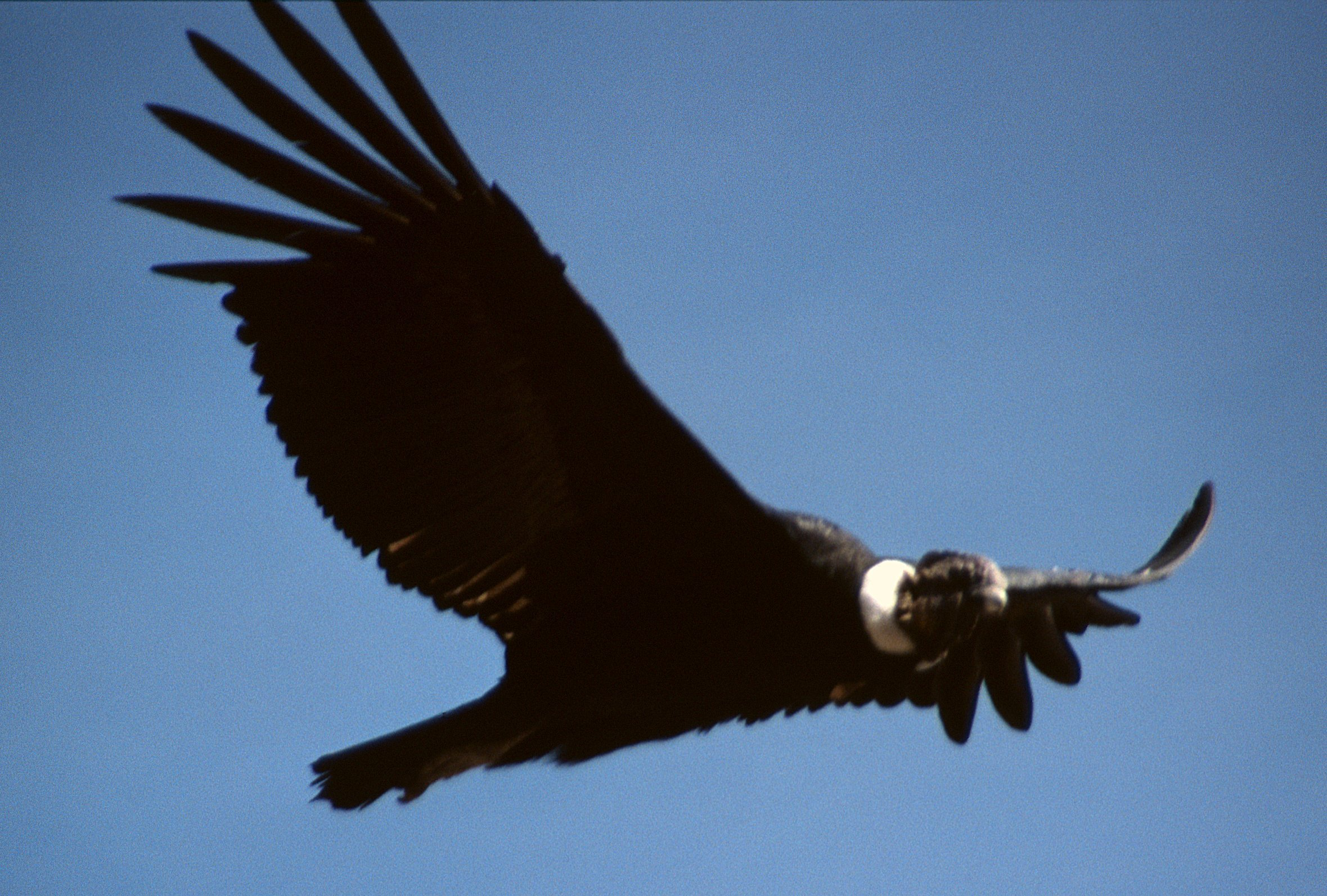
Andean condor (Vultur gryphus), the national bird of Chile

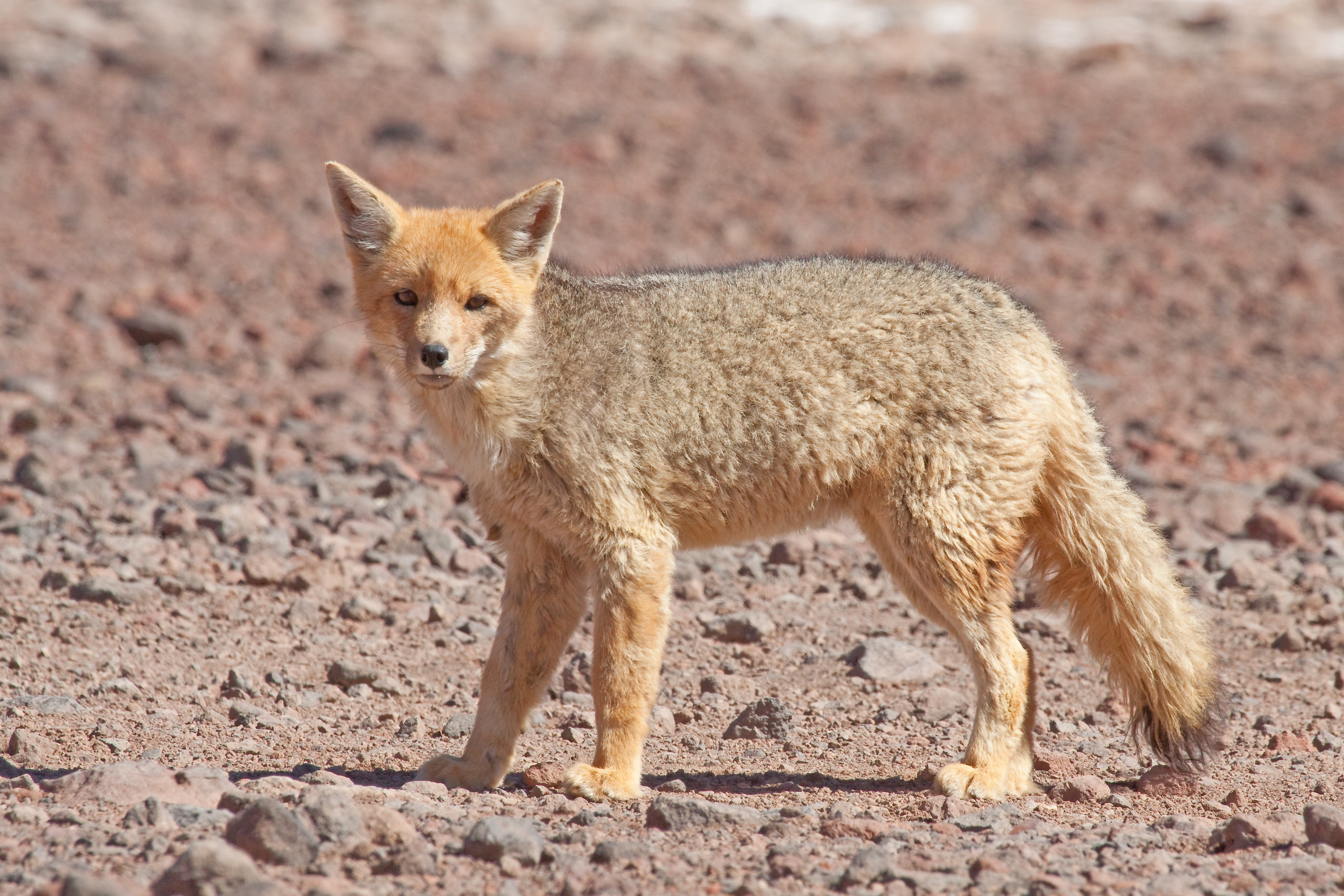
Lycalopex culpaeus, a culpeo or Andean fox

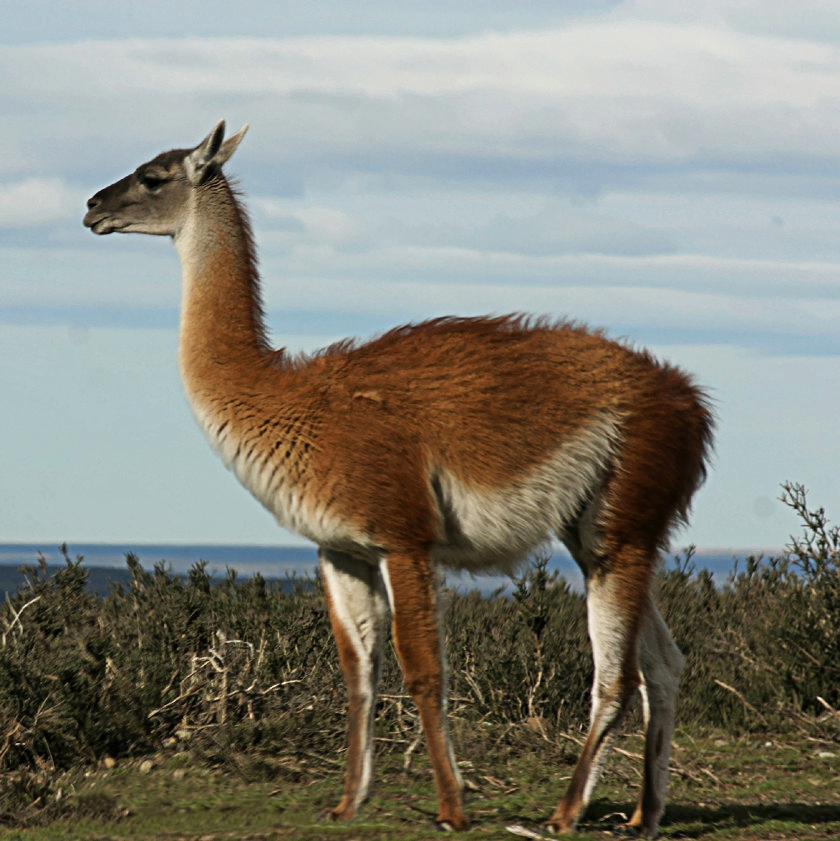
A guanaco in northern Chile

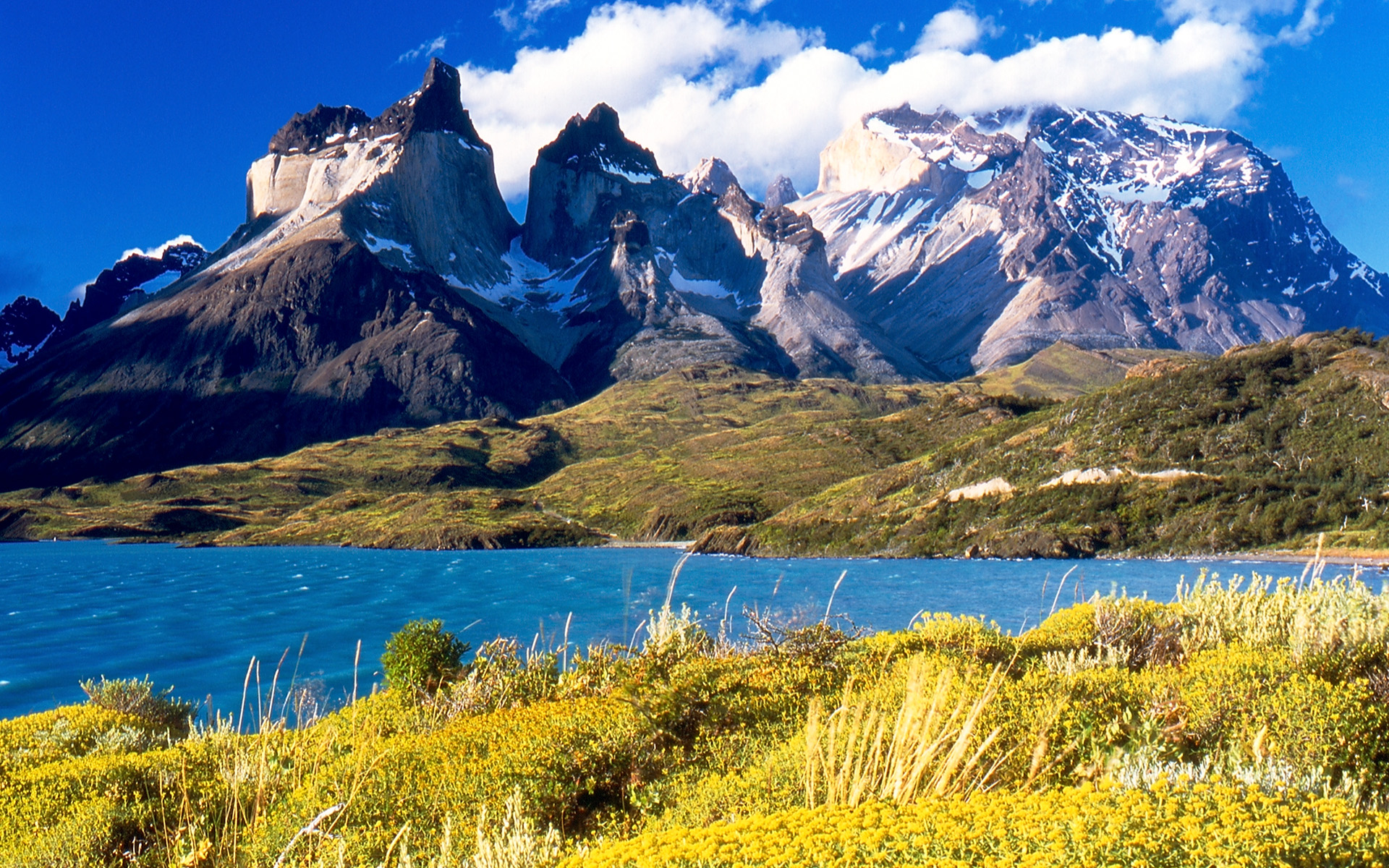
Torres del Paine from Lake Pehoé, Torres del Paine National Park, Chile

== See also ==
- List of ecoregions in Chile
- Climate of Chile
- Geology of Chile
- Geography of Chile
- Jurgen Rottmann

== Bibliography ==
- Chester, Sharon (19 April 2010). A Wildlife Guide to Chile: Continental Chile, Chilean Antarctica, Easter Island, Juan Fernandez Archipelago. Princeton University Press. ISBN 978-1-4008-3150-0.
- Conover, Michael R. (12 December 2010). Resolving Human-Wildlife Conflicts: The Science of Wildlife Damage Management. Taylor & Francis. ISBN 978-1-56670-538-7.
- Gordon, Iain J. (13 January 2009). The Vicuna: The Theory and Practice of Community Based Wildlife Management. Springer. ISBN 978-0-387-09476-2.
- Moreira-Muñoz, Andrés (19 January 2011). Plant Geography of Chile. Springer. ISBN 978-90-481-8748-5.
