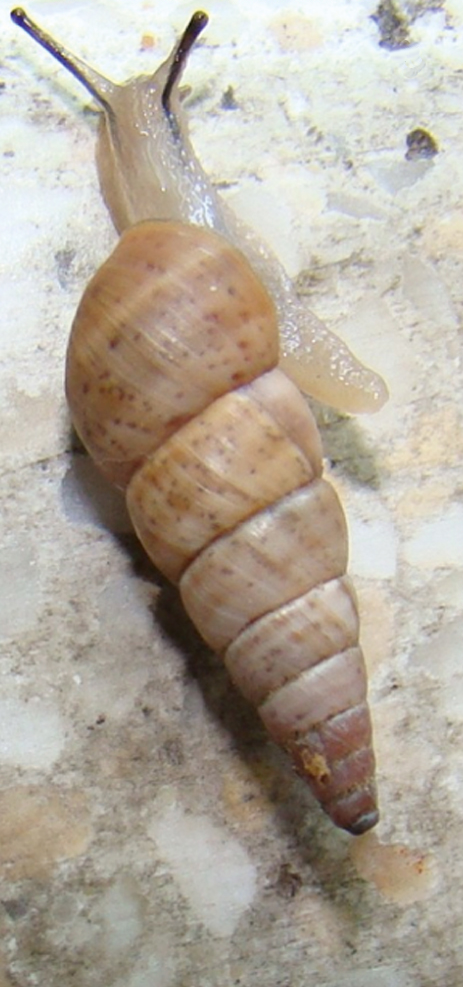
- A live individual of Bostryx turritus

Scientific classification
- Kingdom: Animalia
- Phylum: Mollusca
- Class: Gastropoda
- Order: Stylommatophora
- Suborder: Helicina
- Superfamily: Orthalicoidea
- Family: Bulimulidae
- Genus: Bostryx; Troschel, 1847

Type species
- Bulimus solutus Troschel, 1847

Synonyms
- See list

= Bostryx =

Genus of gastropods

Bostryx is a genus of air-breathing land snails, terrestrial pulmonate gastropod mollusks in the family Bulimulidae.

== Taxonomy ==
Previously this genus was placed within the Orthalicidae.

Bostryx sensu stricto is the type genus of the subfamily Bostrycinae, but some species of Bostryx sensu lato are placed within Bulimulinae. There is need further research to elucidate which subgenera belong to which subfamily.

== Distribution ==
There are 29 species from the genus Bostryx in Chile and numerous species in other countries.

== Ecology ==
They live under stones and on cacti.

Bostryx feeds on lichens.

== Species ==
Species in the genus Bostryx include:

Bostryx sensu stricto

- Bostryx agueroi Weyrauch, 1960
- Bostryx edmundi Breure & Neubert, 2008
- Bostryx longispira Weyrauch, 1960
- Bostryx peruvianus (Pilsbry, 1944)
- Bostryx solutus (Troschel, 1847) - type species of the genus Bostryx
- Bostryx superbus Weyrauch, 1967
- Bostryx torallyi (d'Orbigny, 1835)

Bostryx sensu lato

- Bostryx apodemetes (d'Orbigny, 1835)
- Bostryx bilineatus (G. B. Sowerby I, 1833)
- Bostryx strobeli Parodiz, 1956

other Bostryx species:

- Bostryx affinis (Broderip, 1832)
- Bostryx aguilari Weyrauch, 1967 -
- Bostryx alausiensis (Cousin, 1887)
- Bostryx albicans (Broderip, 1832) (synonym: Bulinus albicans Broderio, 1832)
- Bostryx anachoreta (Pfeiffer, 1856)
- Bostryx anomphalus Pilsbry, 1944
- Bostryx anachoreta (Pfeiffer, 1856)
- Bostryx baeri (Dautzenberg, 1901)
- Bostryx bonneti (Ancey, 1902)
- Bostryx ceroplasta (Pilsbry, 1896)
- Bostryx conspersus (Sowerby, 1833) -
- Bostryx chusgonensis
  - Bostryx chusgonensis sipas Breure & Mogollón Avila, 2010
- Bostryx delicatulus (Philippi, 1867)
- Bostryx derelictus (Broderip, 1832)
- Bostryx devillei Deville & Hupé, 1850;
- Bostryx elatus (Philippi, 1869)
- Bostryx eremothauma (Pilsbry, 1896)
- Bostryx erosus (Broderip, 1832)
- Bostryx erythrostoma (Sowerby, 1833)
- Bostryx fayssianus (Petit de la Saussaye, 1853)
- Bostryx fragilis Breure & Mogollón Avila, 2010
- Bostryx gayi (Rehder, 1945)
- Bostryx granulatus Breure & Neubert, 2008
- Bostryx guttatus (Broderip, 1832)
- Bostryx haasi Weyrauch, 1960
- Bostryx hennahi (Gray, 1830)
- Bostryx holostoma (Pfeiffer, 1856)
- Bostryx huascensis (Reeve, 1848)
- Bostryx huayaboensis (Dautzenberg, 1901)
- Bostryx ignobilis (Philippi, 1867)
- Bostryx imeldae Weyrauch, 1958
- Bostryx inaquosum Breure, 1978
- Bostryx infundibulum (L. Pfeiffer, 1853)
- Bostryx iocosensis (Dautzenberg, 1901)
- Bostryx ireneae Araya, 2015
- Bostryx ischnus (Pilsbry, 1902)
- Bostryx juana (Cousin, 1887)
- Bostryx lactifluus (Pfeiffer, 1856)
- Bostryx leucostictus (Philippi, 1856)
- Bostryx lichenorum (Orbigny, 1835)
- Bostryx limensis (Reeve, 1849)
- Bostryx limonoicus (d'Orbigny, 1835)
- Bostryx lizarasoae Weyrauch, 1967
- Bostryx longispira Weyrauch, 1960
- Bostryx louisae Breure, 1978
- Bostryx luridus (L. Pfeiffer, 1863)
- Bostryx martinezi (Hylton Scott, 1965)
- Bostryx megomphalus Pilsbry, 1944
- Bostryx mejillonensis (Pfeiffer, 1857)
- Bostryx metamorphus (Pilsbry, 1896)
- Bostryx modestus (Broderip, 1832) -
- Bostryx philippii (Rehder, 1945)
- Bostryx pruinosus (Sowerby, 1833)
- Bostryx pumilio (Rehder, 1945)
- Bostryx pupiformis (Broderip, 1833)
- Bostryx pustulosus (Broderip, 1832)
- Bostryx pygmaeus Weyrauch, 1960
- Bostryx pyrgidium (Haas, 1955)
- Bostryx raimondianus (Pilsbry, 1896)
- Bostryx reedi (Parodiz, 1947)
- Bostryx reentsi (Philippi, 1851)
- Bostryx rehderi Weyrauch, 1960
- Bostryx rhodacme (Pfeiffer, 1843)
- Bostryx rhodolarynx (Reeve, 1849)
- Bostryx rodriguezae Weyrauch, 1967
- Bostryx roselleus Miranda & Cuezzo, 2014
- Bostryx rouaulti (Hupé, 1854)
- Bostryx rudisculptus (Parodiz, 1956)
- Bostryx rusticellus (Morelet, 1860)
- Bostryx sagasteguii (Haas, 1966)
- Bostryx sandwichensis (L. Pfeiffer, 1846)
- Bostryx scabiosus (Sowerby, 1833)
- Bostryx scalariformis Broderip, 1832 -
- Bostryx scotophilus Weyrauch, 1967
- Bostryx scutulatus (Broderip, 1832)
- Bostryx serotinus (Morelet, 1860)
- Bostryx simpliculus (L. Pfeiffer, 1855)
- Bostryx solutus (Troschel, 1847)
- Bostryx sordidus Lesson, 1826 -
- Bostryx spiculatus (Morelet, 1860)
- Bostryx stelzneri (Dohrn, 1875)
- Bostryx strobeli (Parodiz, 1956)
- Bostryx styliger (Beck, 1837)
- Bostryx subcactorum (Pilsbry, 1896)
- Bostryx subelatus (Haas, 1948)
- Bostryx superbus Weyrauch, 1967
- Bostryx torallyi (d'Orbigny, 1835)
- Bostryx tortoranus (Doering, 1879)
- Bostryx tricinctus (Reeve, 1848)
- Bostryx tschudii (L. Pfeiffer, 1848)
- Bostryx tubulatus (Morelet, 1860)
- Bostryx tumidulus (L. Pfeiffer, 1842)
- Bostryx turritus (Broderip, 1832)
- Bostryx tyleri (Dall, 1912)
- Bostryx umbilicaris (Souleyet, 1842)
- Bostryx umbilicatellus (Pilsbry, 1896)
- Bostryx valdovinosi Araya, 2015
- Bostryx variabilis Herm, 1970
- Bostryx veruculum (Morelet, 1860)
- Bostryx viarius (Pilsbry, 1932)
- Bostryx vilchezi Weyrauch, 1960
- Bostryx virgula (Haas, 1951)
- Bostryx virgultorum (Morelet, 1863)
- Bostryx voithianus (Pfeiffer, 1847)
- Bostryx webbi (Haas, 1951)
- Bostryx weyrauchi Pilsbry, 1944
- Bostryx williamsi (L. Pfeiffer, 1858)
- Bostryx willinki Weyrauch, 1964
- Bostryx woodwardi (L. Pfeiffer, 1857)
- Bostryx zilchi Weyrauch, 1958

== Synonyms ==
- Ataxellus Dall, 1912
- Ataxus Albers, 1850
- Bilamelliferus Weyrauch, 1958 (junior synonymy)
- Bostryx (Bostryx) Troschel, 1847· accepted, alternate representation
- Bostryx (Dentaxis) Pilsbry, 1902· accepted, alternate representation
- Bostryx (Discobostryx) Pilsbry & Olsson, 1949 (junior synonymy)
- Bostryx (Elatibostryx) Weyrauch, 1958 (junior synonymy)
- Bostryx (Geoceras) Pilsbry, 1896 (junior synonymy)
- Bostryx (Geopyrgus) Pilsbry, 1896· accepted, alternate representation
- Bostryx (Kionoptyx) F. Haas, 1966· accepted, alternate representation
- Bostryx (Lissoacme) Pilsbry, 1896· accepted, alternate representation
- Bostryx (Multifasciatus) Weyrauch, 1958 (junior synonymy)
- Bostryx (Pampasinus) Weyrauch, 1958 (junior synonymy)
- Bostryx (Peronaeus) Albers, 1860
- Bostryx (Phenacotaxus) Dall, 1912
- Bostryx (Platybostryx) Pilsbry, 1896
- Bostryx (Pseudoperonaeus) Weyrauch, 1958 (junior synonymy)
- Bostryx (Scansicohlea) Pilsbry, 1930· accepted, alternate representation
- Bostryx (Vermetellus) F. Haas, 1951 (junior synonymy)
- Bulimulus (Ataxus) Albers, 1850 (junior synonymy)
- Bulimulus (Bostryx) Troschel, 1847 (original rank)
- Bulimulus (Lissoacme) Pilsbry, 1896
- Bulimulus (Peronaeus) Albers, 1850
- Bulimulus (Scansicochlea) F. Haas, 1932
- Elatibostryx Weyrauch, 1958
- Floreziellus Weyrauch, 1967 (junior synonymy)
- Geoceras Pilsbry, 1896
- Kionoptyx Haas, 1966 (junior synonymy)
- Multifasciatus Weyrauch, 1958
- Naesiotellus Weyrauch, 1967
- Naesiotus (Naesiotellus) Weyrauch, 1967 (junior synonymy)
- Pampasinus Weyrauch, 1958
- Peronaeus Albers, 1850
- Peronaeus (Lissoacme) Pilsbry, 1896
- Peronaeus (Peronaeus) Albers, 1850
- Phenacotaxus Dall, 1912
- Pseudoperonaeus Weyrauch, 1958
- Pyrgus Albers, 1850
