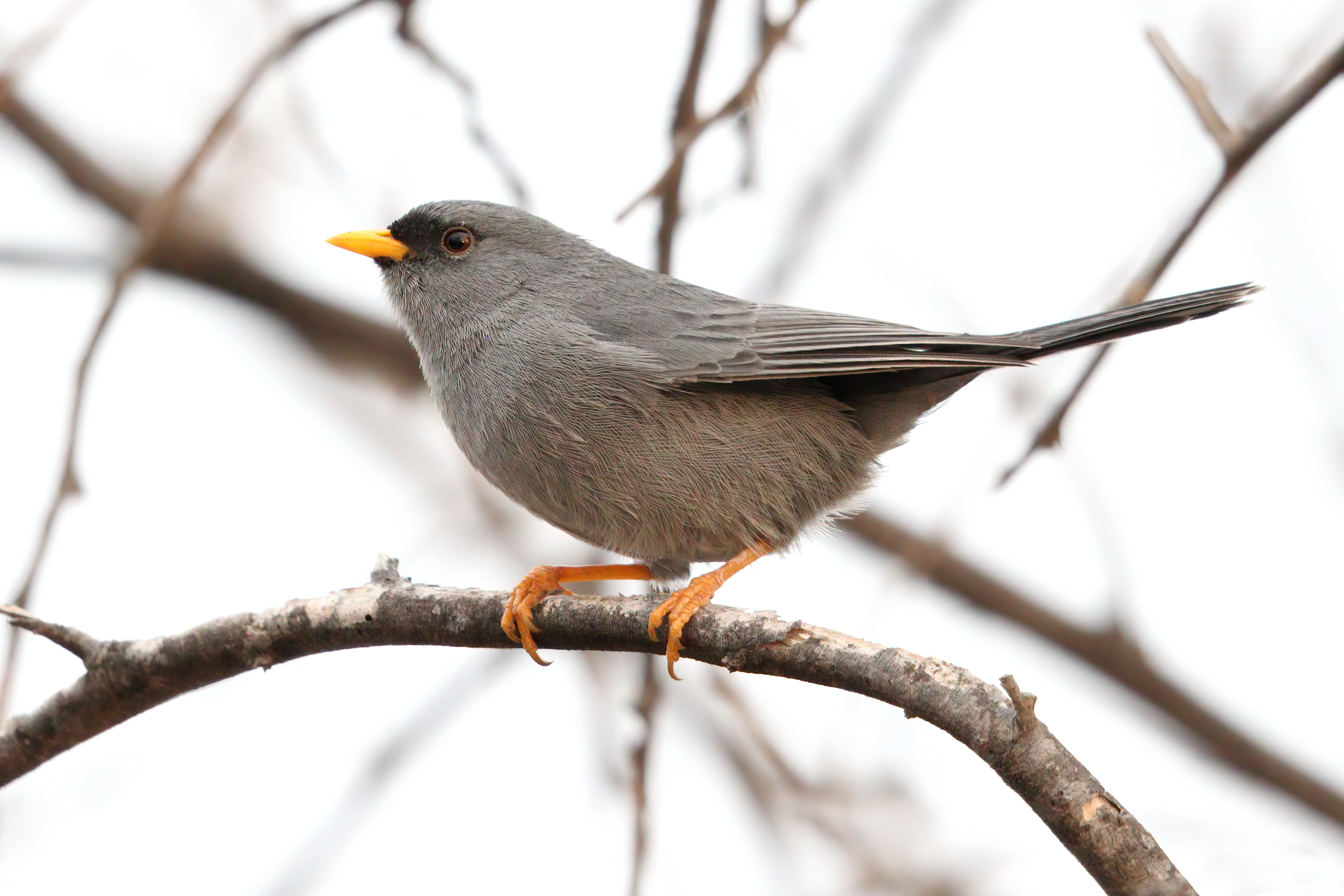

Conservation status
- Near Threatened (IUCN 3.1)

Scientific classification
- Kingdom: Animalia
- Phylum: Chordata
- Class: Aves
- Order: Passeriformes
- Family: Thraupidae
- Genus: Xenospingus; Cabanis, 1867
- Species: X. concolor

Binomial name
- Xenospingus concolor (D'Orbigny & Lafresnaye, 1837)

= Slender-billed finch =

Species of bird

The slender-billed finch (Xenospingus concolor) is a species of bird in the tanager family Thraupidae. It is the only member of the genus Xenospingus.

It is restricted to southwest Peru and northern Chile, and inhabits mainly riverine vegetation along coastal valleys. It has been considered endangered due to loss of habitat. Riparian thickets that were common are under pressure from logging by farm owners. Some information has indicated that it has adapted to threats by using olive tree plantations and other artificial habitats successfully.

== Taxonomy ==
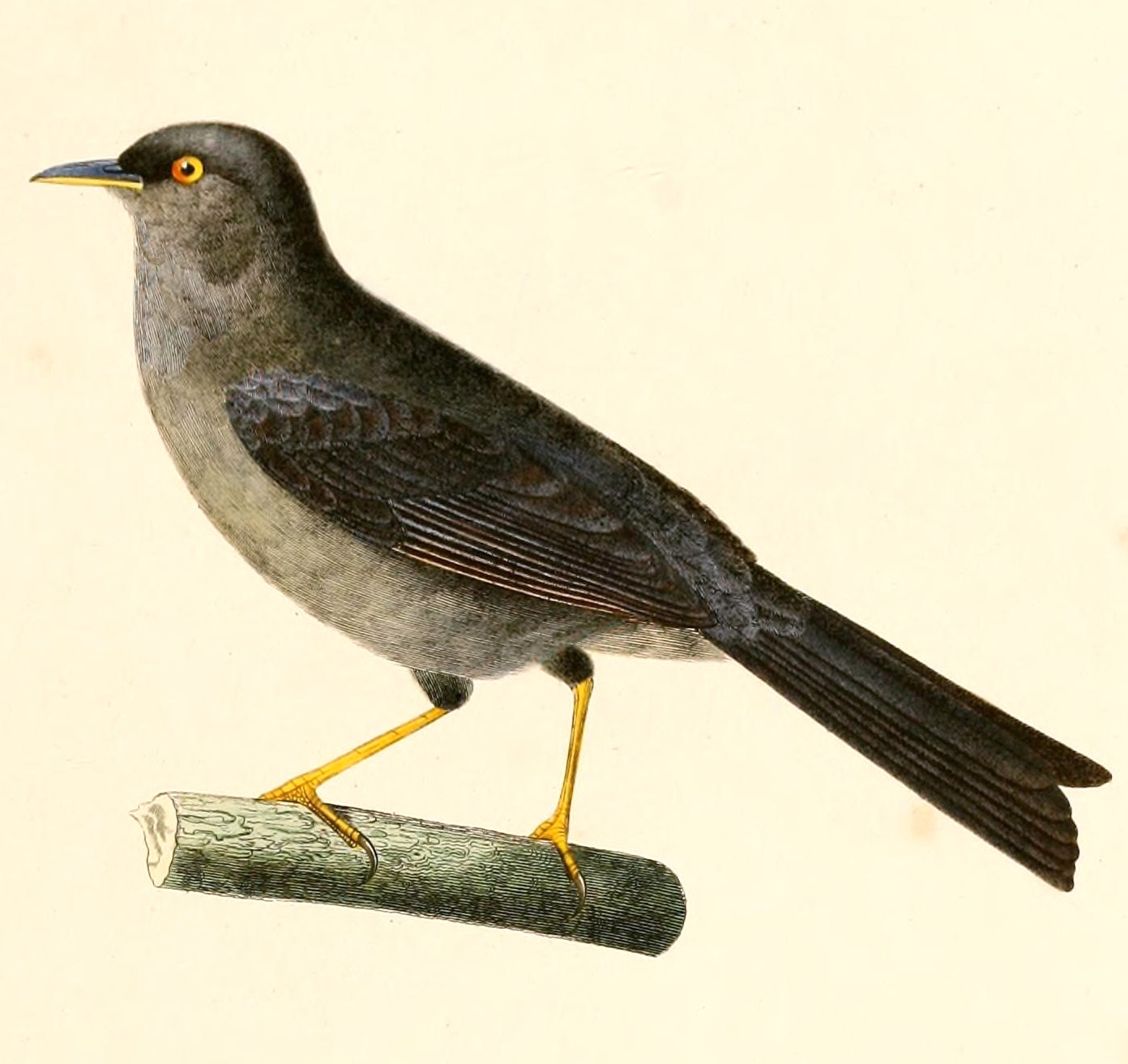

The slender-billed finch was formally described in 1837 by the French naturalists Alcide d'Orbigny and Frédéric de Lafresnaye under the binomial name Sylvia concolor. They specified the type location as the city of Arica which was then in Peru and is now in northern Chile. The slender-billed finch is the only species placed in the genus Xenospingus that was introduced by the German ornithologist Jean Cabanis in 1867. The genus name combines the Ancient Greek xenos meaning 'strange' or 'different' with spingos meaning 'finch'. The specific epithet concolor is Latin for 'uniform', 'similar in colour' or 'plain'. The species is monotypic: no subspecies are recognised.

A molecular phylogenetic study of the tanagers published in 2014 found that the slender-billed finch was a member of the subfamily Poospizinae and was most closely related to the cinereous finch (Piezorina cinerea).
