= Fritz Haas =

Jewish German zoologist

Fritz Haas (January 4, 1886 – December 26, 1969 in Hollywood, Florida) was a Jewish German zoologist born in Frankfurt am Main. He specialized in the field of malacology.

He was trained in biology by herpetologist Oskar Boettger (1844–1910) and malacologist Wilhelm Kobelt (1840–1916). From 1911 to 1936, he was a curator of invertebrate zoology at the Senckenberg Museum in Frankfurt am Main. On June 30, 1936, the Nazis removed him from his position at the Senckenberg Museum. Fleeing Germany, Haas was appointed as the first curator of the new department of lower invertebrates (now the Division of Invertebrates) at the Field Museum of Natural History in Chicago, a position he retained until 1959. He identified and cataloged specimens that had lain unexamined since the 1893 World Columbian Exposition, starting to build the museum's now world-class collection of aquatic invertebrates.

Haas' specialty involved the study of land and freshwater snails, as well as research of the family Unionidae (freshwater mussels). He performed extensive field investigations in Norway (1910), Pyrenees, Spain, France (1914–19), southern Africa (1931–32; as part of the Hans Schomburgk expedition) and the Americas (Brazil, Bermuda, Cuba, Canada).

Among his better known written works was a 1969 monograph titled Superfamilia Unionacea. He is credited with combining over 4000 names from the family Unionidae into 837 recognized species.

Malacological bibliography with 319 entries and 77 generic names and 308 specific (and subspecific) names of molluscs originally described by Fritz Haas, provided by Alan Solem in 1967.

== Eponymous taxa ==
Taxa named in honor of Fritz Haas include:

- Cipangopaludina haasi (Prashad, 1928)
- Cuspidaria haasi (Knudsen, 1970)
- The fish Enteromius haasianus L. R. David, 1936,
