= List of non-marine molluscs of Peru =

Location of Peru

The non-marine molluscs of Peru are a part of the molluscan fauna of Peru (wildlife of Peru).

A number of species of non-marine molluscs are found in the wild in Peru.

There are 852 species of gastropods (89 species of freshwater gastropods, 763 species of land gastropods) and 40 species of freshwater bivalves living in the wild.

There is altogether 129 species of freshwater molluscs in Peru.

Summary table of number of species:
Numbers of molluscs by habitat	Number of species
Freshwater gastropods	89
Land gastropods	763
Total number of non-marine gastropods	852
Freshwater bivalves	40
Total number of non-marine molluscs	892

== Freshwater gastropods ==
Freshwater gastropods include:

Ampullariidae

- Pomacea haustrum (Reeve, 1856)

Planorbidae

- Biomphalaria andecola (Orbigny, 1835)
- Biomphalaria helophila (Orbigny, 1835)
- Biomphalaria peregrina (Orbigny, 1835) - synonym: Biomphalaria pucaraensis (Preston, 1909)
- Biomphalaria tenagophila (Orbigny, 1835)
- Drepanotrema kermatoides (Orbigny, 1835)
- Drepanotrema limayanum (Lesson, 1830)
- Helisoma trivolvis (Say, 1817)
- Helisoma duryi (Wetherby, 1879)

Lymnaeidae

- Lymnaea viatrix Orbigny, 1835

Physidae

- Physa acuta Draparnaud, 1801
- seemingly Physa peruviana Gray, 1828

== Land gastropods ==
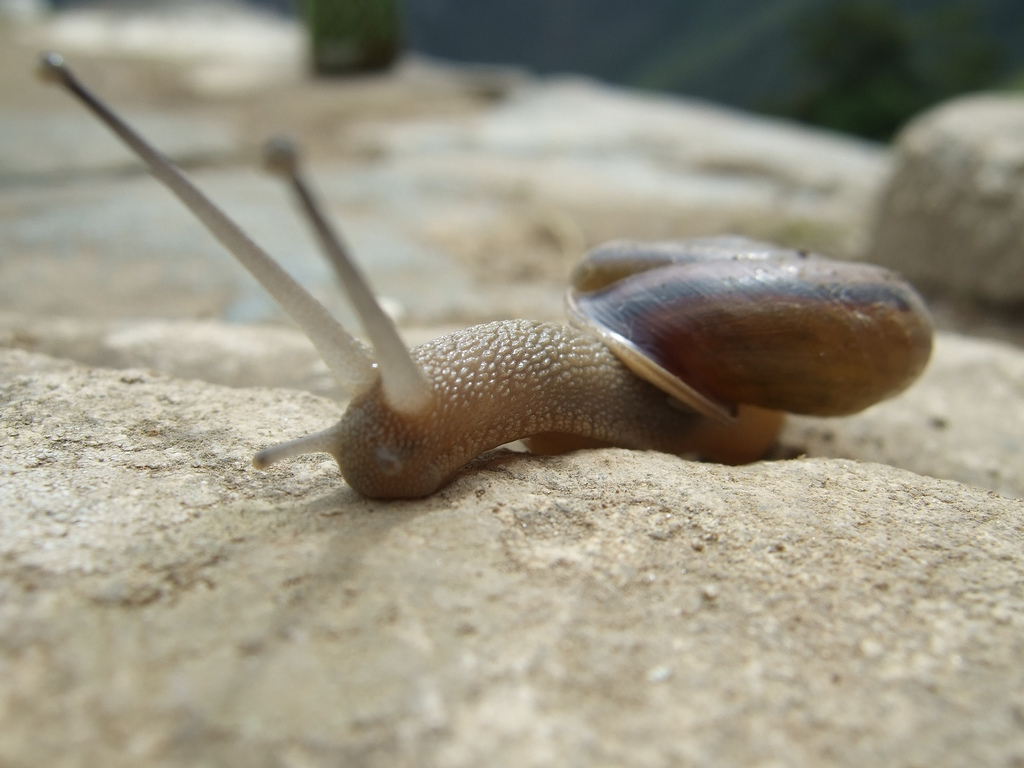
an unidentified land snail from Peru

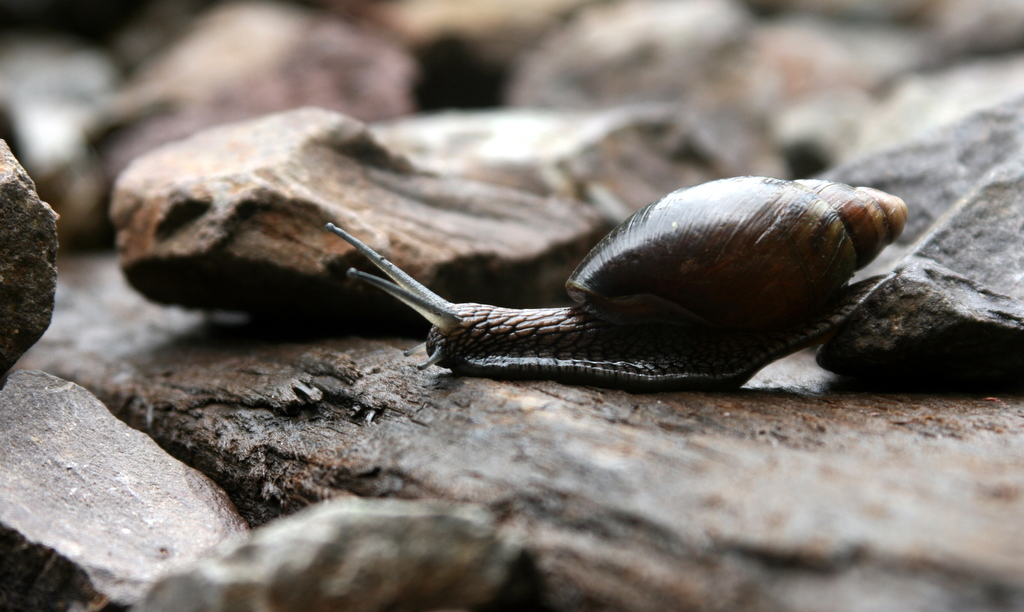
an unidentified land snail from Peru

There are other 30 genera of land gastropods, than mentioned below next to families, with 56 species.

Helicinidae - 2 genera, 25 species

- ...

Neocyclotidae - 4 genera, 20 species

- ...

Orthalicidae - without Bulimulinae has 4 genera and 18 species in Peru.

- ...

Orthalicidae, Bulimulinae - only Bulimulinae has 15 genera, 424 species in Peru

- ...

Veronicellidae

- Colosius pulcher (Colosi 1921)
- Heterovaginina limayana (Lesson 1830)
- Latipes lisei Thomé & Gomes 1999
- Montivaginulus coriaceus (Kraus 1954)
- Novovaginula carinata (Thiele 1927)
- Novovaginula rosaneae Thomé & Gomes 1999
- Phyllocaulis gayi (Fischer 1871)
- Sarasinula marginata (Semper, 1885)

Subulinidae - 5 genera, 19 species

- Leptinaria unilamellata (d'Orbigny, 1837)

Clausiliidae - 14 genera, 75 species

- ...

Scolodontidae - 8 genera, 55 species

- ...

Charopidae - 3 genera, 13 species

- ...

Pleurodontidae - 2 genera, 13 species

- ...

Camaenidae - 2 genera, 12 species

- ...

Helminthoglyptidae - 2 genera, 33 species

- ...

== Freshwater bivalves ==
Freshwater bivalves include:

Hyriidae

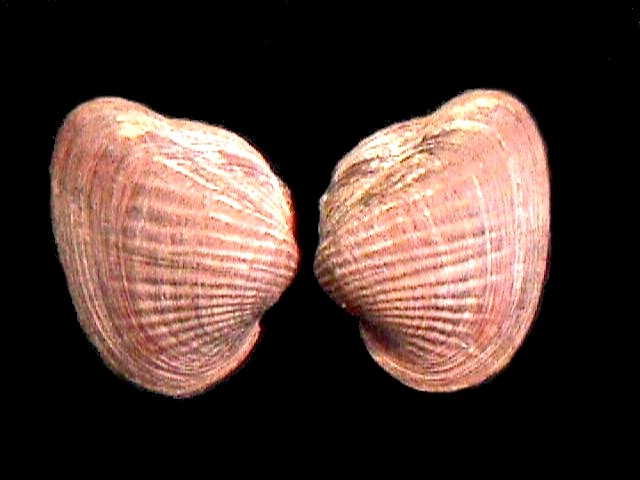
Castalia schombergiana

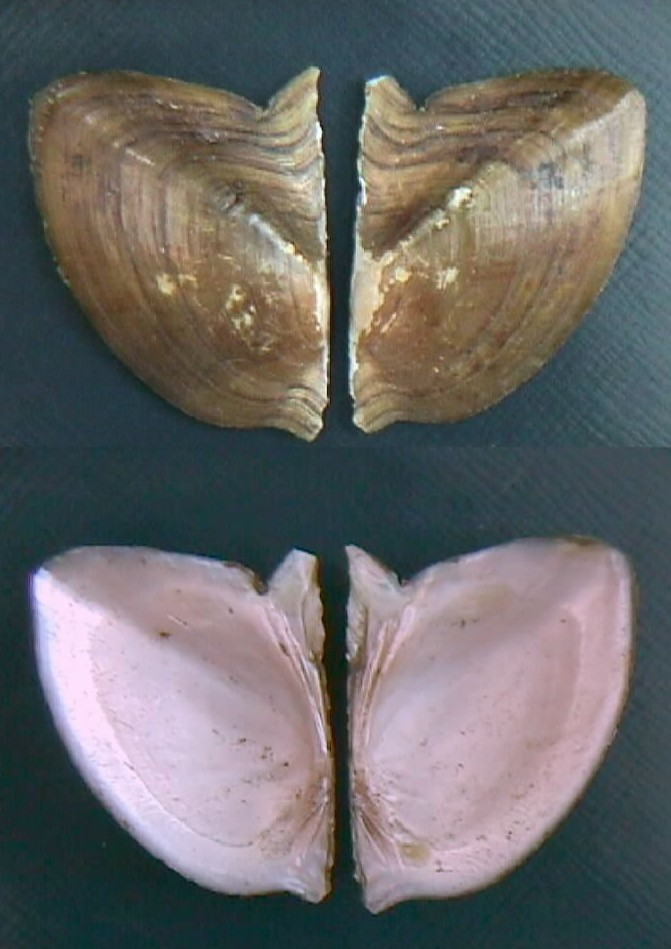
Paxyodon syrmathophorus

- Callonaia duprei (Recluz, 1843)
- Castalia ambigua Lamarck, 1819 - Castalia ambigua ambigua Lamarck, 1819
- Castalia multisulcata Hupé, 1857
- Castalia schombergiana Sowerby, 1869
- Castalia sulcata - Castalia sulcata orbygnyi Hupé & Deville, 1850
- Diplodon limensis (Kust-Chemnitz, 1851)
- Diplodon obsolescens Baker, 1914
- Diplodon suavidicus (Lea, 1856)
- Diplodontites cookei Kust & Chemnitz, 1851
- Paxyodon syrmathophorus Meuschen, 1781
- Prisodon obliquus Schumacher, 1817
- Triplodon corrugatus (Lamarck, 1819)

Mycetopodidae

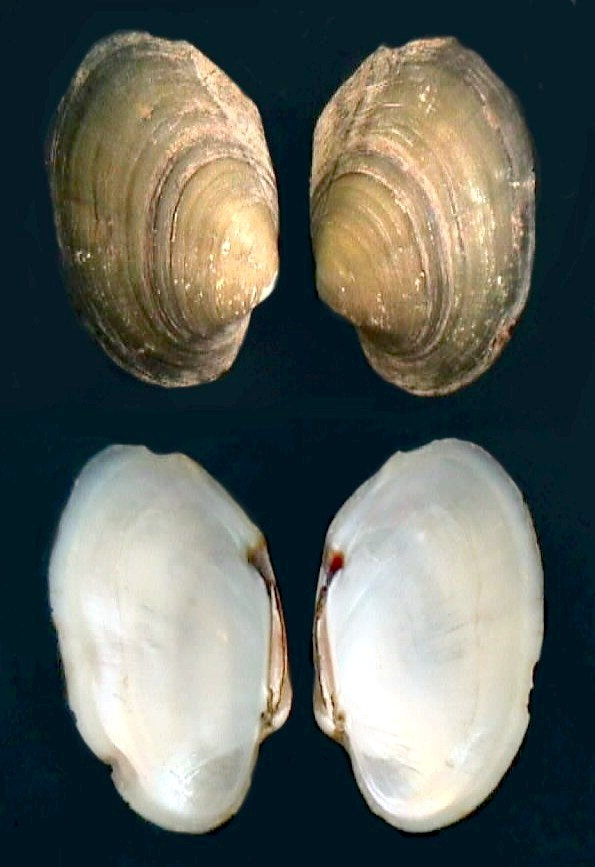
Anodontites trapesialis

- Anodonta solidula Lamarck, 1819
- Anodonta subsinuata Phillippi, 1869
- Anodonta subrostrata Phillippi, 1869
- Anodonta ucayalensis Phillippi, 1869
- Anodontites elongatus (Swainson, 1823)
- Anodontites ensiformis (Spix & Wagner, 1827)
- Anodontites incarum (Philippi, 1869)
- Anodontites tenebricosa (Lea, 1834)
- Anodontites trapesialis (Lamarck, 1819) - Anodontites trapesialis trapesialis (Lamarck, 1819)
- Anodontites trapezeus (Spix, 1827)
- Anodontites trigonus (Spix, 1827) - Anodontites trigonus trigonus (Spix, 1827)
- Anodontites weirauchi Hass, 1930
- Iheringiella sp.
- Leila blainvilliana (Lea, 1834)
- Leila esula (Orbigny, 1835)
- Monocondylaea semisulcata Adams, 1870
- Mycetopoda siliquosa Spix, 1827
- Mycetopoda soleniformis Orbigny, 1835
- Mycetopodella falcata (Higgins, 1868)
- Tamsiella sp.

Etheriidae

- Barlettia stefanensis (Moricand, 1856)

Sphaeriidae

- Eupera simoni Jousseaume, 1889
- Eupera primei Klappenbach, 1967
- Pisidium meierbrooki Kuiper & Hinz, 1983
- Sphaerium forbesii Philippi, 1869
- Sphaerium lauricocheae Philippi, 1870
- Sphaerium titicacence (Pilsbry, 1924)

Corbiculidae

- Corbicula sp.

== See also ==
- List of marine molluscs of Peru

Lists of molluscs of surrounding countries:

- List of non-marine molluscs of Ecuador, Wildlife of Ecuador
- List of non-marine molluscs of Colombia, Wildlife of Colombia
- List of non-marine molluscs of Brazil, Wildlife of Brazil
- List of non-marine molluscs of Bolivia, Wildlife of Bolivia
- List of non-marine molluscs of Chile, Wildlife of Chile
