= List of non-marine molluscs of Ecuador =

Location of Ecuador

The non-marine molluscs of Ecuador are a part of the wildlife of Ecuador (fauna of Ecuador).

167 species of land snail from Orthalicoidea have been recorded from Ecuador (63 of them in Galapagos).

== Land gastropods ==
Achatinidae

- Protobeliscus cuneus (L. Pfeiffer, 1852)
- Rhodea cousini Jousseaume, 1900
- Zoniferella riveti (Germain, 1907)

Helicinidae

- Bourciera fraseri (Pfeiffer, 1859)
- Bourciera helicinaeformis (Pfeiffer, 1853)
- Bourciera viridissima (Miller, 1879)

Neocyclotidae

- Calaperostoma nigrofasciatum (Miller, 1879)

Orthalicidae

- Plekocheilus cardinalis (Pfeiffer, 1853)
- Plekocheilus aristaceus (Crosse, 1869)
- Plekocheilus aureonitens (Miller, 1878)
- Plekocheilus corydon (Crosse, 1869)
- Plekocheilus doliarius (Da Costa, 1898)
- Plekocheilus eros (Angas, 1878)
- Plekocheilus floccosus (Spix, 1827)
- Plekocheilus jimenezi (Hidalgo, 1872) - Plekocheilus jimenezi oligostylus Pilsbry, 1939
- Plekocheilus lynciculus (Deville & Hupé, 1850)
- Plekocheilus mcgintyi 'Pilsbry' H. B. Baker, 1963
- Plekocheilus nocturnus Pilsbry, 1939
- Plekocheilus phoebus (Pfeiffer, 1863)
- Plekocheilus pulicarius (Reeve, 1848)
- Plekocheilus roseolabrum (E. A. Smith, 1877)
- Plekocheilus taylorianus (Reeve, 1849)
- Plekocheilus tricolor (Pfeiffer, 1853)
- Plekocheilus tenuissimus (Weyrauch, 1967)
- Thaumastus thompsonii (Pfeiffer, 1845)
- Thaumastus thompsonoides Oberwimmer, 1931
- Thaumastus jaspideus (Morelet, 1863)
- Thaumastus sarcochrous (Pilsbry, 1897)
- Thaumastus brunneus Strebel, 1910
- Thaumastus buckleyi (Higgins, 1872)
- Thaumastus flori (Jousseaume, 1897)
- Thaumastus hartwegi (Pfeiffer, 1846)
- Thaumastus indentatus (Da Costa, 1901)
- Thaumastus integer (Pfeiffer, 1855)
- Thaumastus loxostomus (Pfeiffer, 1853)
- Thaumastus orcesi Weyrauch, 1967
- Bostryx bilineatus (Sowerby, 1833)
- ?Bostryx ceroplasta (Pilsbry, 1896)
- Bostryx juana (Cousin, 1887)
- Bulimulus fontainii (d'Orbigny, 1837)
- Naesiotus achatinellus (Forbes, 1850) / Bulimulus achatellinus
- Naesiotus adelphus (Dall, 1917) / Bulimulus adelphus
- Naesiotus adserseni (Coppois, 1985) / Bulimulus adserseni (Coppois, 1985)
- Naesiotus akamatus (Dall, 1917) / Bulimulus akamatus
- Naesiotus albemarlensis (Dall, 1917) / Bulimulus albermalensis
- Naesiotus alethorhytidus (Dall, 1917) / Bulimulus alethorhytidus
- Naesiotus amastroides (Ancey, 1887) / Bulimulus amastroides
- Naesiotus approximatus (Dall, 1900)
- Naesiotus bauri (Dall, 1893)
- Naesiotus blombergi (Odhner, 1951) / Bulimulus blombergi
- Naesiotus calvus (Sowerby, 1833) / Bulimulus calvus
- Naesiotus canaliferus (Reibisch, 1892)
- Naesiotus cavagnaroi A. G. Smith, 1972 / Bulimulus cavagnaroi
- Naesiotus chemnitzoides (Forbes, 1850) / Bulimulus chemitzioides
- Naesiotus cinerarius (Dall, 1917) / Bulimulus cinerarius
- Naesiotus cucullinus (Dall, 1917) / Bulimulus cucullinus
- Naesiotus curtus (Reibisch, 1892) / Bulimulus curtus
- Naesiotus cymatias (Dall, 1917)
- Naesiotus darwini (Pfeiffer, 1846) / Bulimulus darwini
- Naesiotus deroyi A. G. Smith, 1972
- Naesiotus deridderi / Bulimulus deridderi (Coppois, 1985)
- Naesiotus duncanus (Dall, 1893) / Bulimulus duncanus
- Naesiotus elaeodes (Dall, 1917) / Bulimulus elaeodes
- Naesiotus eos Odhner, 1951 / Bulimulus eos
- Naesiotus eschariferus (Sowerby, 1833) / Bulimulus eschariferus (Ancey, 1887)
- Naesiotus florschuetzi Breure, 1978
- Naesiotus galapaganus (Pfeiffer, 1855) / Bulimulus galapaganus
- Naesiotus gilderoyi (Van Mol, 1972)
- Naesiotus habeli (Dall, 1892) / Bulimulus habeli
- Naesiotus hemaerodes (Dall, 1917) / Bulimulus hemaerodes
- Naesiotus hirsutus Vagvolgyi, 1977 / Bulimulus hirsutus
- Naesiotus hoodensis (Dall, 1900) / Bulimulus hoodensis
- Naesiotus indefatigabilis (Dall, 1900) / Bulimulus indefatigabilis
- Naesiotus jacobi (Sowerby, 1833) / Bulimulus jacobi
- Naesiotus jervisensis (Dall & Ochsner, 1917) / Bulimulus jervisensis
- Naesiotus kublerensis Chambers, 1986
- Naesiotus lycodus (Dall, 1917) / Bulimulus lycodus
- Naesiotus nesioticus (Dall, 1896) / Bulimulus nesioticus
- Naesiotus nucula (Pfeiffer, 1854) / Bulimulus nucula
- Naesiotus nux (Broderip, 1832) / Bulimulus nux
- Naesiotus ochseneri (Dall, 1893) / Bulimulus ochsneri
- Naesiotus olla (Dall, 1893) / Bulimulus olla
- Naesiotus pallidus (Reibisch, 1892) / Bulimulus pallidus
- Naesiotus perrus (Dall, 1917) / Bulimulus perrus
- Naesiotus perspectivus (Pfeiffer, 1846) / Bulimulus perspectivus
- Naesiotus pinzonensis Vagvolgyi, 1977
- Naesiotus pinzonopsis Vagvolgyi, 1977
- Naesiotus planospira (Ancey, 1887) / Bulimulus planospira (Ancey, 1887)
- Naesiotus prepinguis Vagvolgyi, 1977
- Naesiotus quitensis (Pfeiffer, 1848) - Naesiotus quitensis ambatensis Rehder, 1940; Naesiotus quitensis orinus Rehder, 1940; Naesiotus quitensis vermiculatus Rehder, 1940
- Naesiotus rabidensis (Dall, 1917) / Bulimulus rabidensis
- Naesiotus reibischii (Dall, 1895) / Bulimulus reibischi
- Naesiotus rugatinus (Dall, 1917) / Bulimulus rugatinus
- Naesiotus rugiferus (Sowerby, 1833) / Bulimulus rugiferus
- Naesiotus rugulosus (Sowerby, 1838?) / Bulimulus rugulosus
- Naesiotus saeronius (Dall, 1917) / Bulimulus saeronius
- Naesiotus sculpturatus (Pfeiffer, 1846) / Bulimulus sculpturatus
- Naesiotus simrothi (Reibisch, 1892) / Bulimulus simrothi
- Naesiotus snodgrassi (Dall, 1900)
- Naesiotus steadmani Chambers, 1986
- Bulimulus sp. nov. 'josevillani'
- Bulimulus sp. nov. 'krameri'
- Bulimulus sp. nov. 'nilsodhneri'
- Bulimulus sp. nov. 'tuideroyi'
- Bulimulus sp. nov. 'vanmoli'
- Naesiotus tanneri (Dall, 1895) / Bulimulus tanneri - Naesiotus tanneri bartolomensis Vagvolgyi, 1977; Naesiotus tanneri edenensis Vagvolgyi, 1977
- Naesiotus tortuganus (Dall, 1893) / Bulimulus tortuganus
- Naesiotus trogonius (Dall, 1917) / Bulimulus trogonius
- Naesiotus unifasciatus (Sowerby, 1833) / Bulimulus unifasciatus
- Naesiotus ustulatus (Sowerby, 1833) / Bulimulus ustulatus
- Naesiotus ventrosus (Reibisch, 1892)
- Naesiotus wolfi (Reibisch, 1892) / Bulimulus wolfi
- Scutalus aequatorius (Pfeiffer, 1853)
- Scutalus anthisanensis (Pfeiffer, 1853)
- Scutalus cousini (Jousseaume, 1887)
- Stenostylus colmeiroi (Hidalgo, 1872)
- ?Stenostylus guttulus (Pfeiffer, 1854)
- Drymaeus aequatorianus (E. A. Smith, 1877)
- Drymaeus albolabiatus (E. A. Smith, 1877)
- Drymaeus ambustus (Reeve, 1849)
- Drymaeus andai (Jousseaume, 1898)
- Drymaeus baezensis (Hidalgo, 1869)
- Drymaeus bourcieri (Pfeiffer, 1853)
- Drymaeus buckleyi (Sowerby, 1895)
- Drymaeus chimborasensis (Reeve, 1848)
- Drymaeus decoratus (Lea, 1838)
- Drymaeus elegantissimus (Mousson, 1873)
- Drymaeus expansus (Pfeiffer, 1848) - Drymaeus expansus altorum (Weyrauch, 1958); Drymaeus expansus orcesi (Weyrauch, 1958)
- Drymaeus fallax (Pfeiffer, 1853)
- Drymaeus fordii Pilsbry, 1898
- Drymaeus fucatus (Reeve, 1849)
- ?Drymaeus fusoides (d'Orbigny, 1835)
- Drymaeus hidalgoi (Da Costa, 1898)
- Drymaeus inaequalis (Pfeiffer, 1857)
- Drymaeus membielinus (Crosse, 1867)
- Drymaeus murrinus (Reeve, 1848)
- Drymaeus nystianus (Pfeiffer, 1853)
- Drymaeus ochrocheilus (E. A. Smith, 1877)
- Drymaeus orthostomus (E. A. Smith, 1877)
- Drymaeus peeliii (Reeve, 1859)
- Drymaeus petasites (Miller, 1878)
- Drymaeus planibasis Pilsbry, 1932
- Drymaeus quadrifasciatus (Angas, 1878)
- Drymaeus rabuti (Jousseaume, 1898)
- Drymaeus rhoadsi Pilsbry, 1932
- Drymaeus rubrovariegatus (Higgins, 1868)
- Drymaeus sachsei (Albers, 1854)
- ?Drymaeus scitulus (Reeve, 1849)

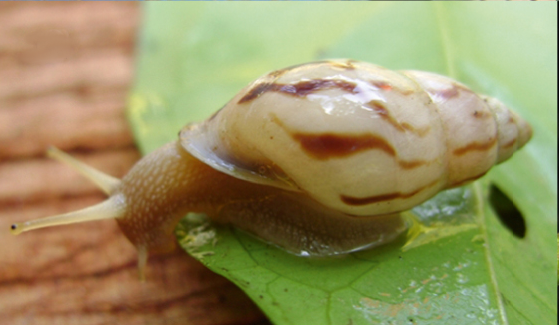
Drymaeus strigatus

- Drymaeus strigatus (Sowerby, 1833) - synonym: Drymaeus tigrinus (Da Costa, 1898)
- Drymaeus subeffusus (Philippi, 1869)
- Drymaeus violaceus (Mousson, 1873)
- Drymaeus volsus Fulton, 1907
- Drymaeus cactivorus (Broderip, 1832)
- ?Drymaeus fidustus (Reeve, 1849)
- Drymaeus flavidulus (E. A. Smith, 1877)
- Drymaeus loxanus (Higgins, 1872)
- Drymaeus loxensis (Pfeiffer, 1846)
- ?Drymaeus nigrofasciatus - Drymaeus nigrofasciatus elongatulus Pilsbry, 1898
- ?Drymaeus serenus (Philippi, 1867)
- Drymaeus subpellucidus (E. A. Smith, 1877)
- Drymaeus wintlei Finch, 1929
- Simpulopsis citrinovitrea (Moricand, 1836)
- Sultana sultana (Dillwyn, 1817)
- Sultana augusti (Jousseaume, 1887)
- Sultana deburghiae (Reeve, 1859)
- Sultana kellettii (Reeve, 1850)
- Sultana fraseri (Pfeiffer, 1858)

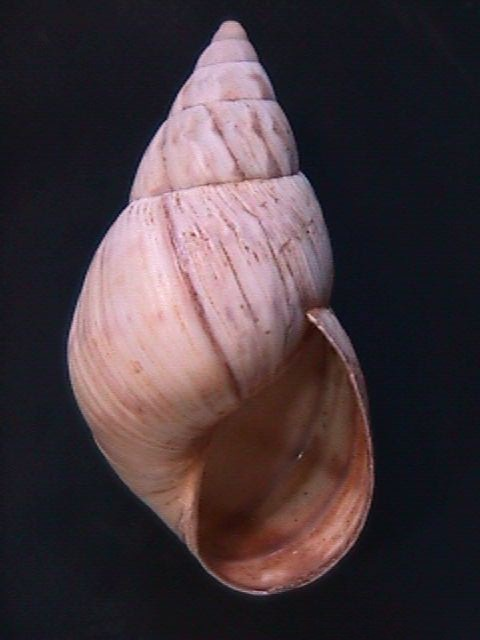
shell of Orthalicus maracaibensis

- Orthalicus bensoni (Reeve, 1849)
- Orthalicus bifulguratus (Reeve, 1849)
- Orthalicus maracaibensis (Pfeiffer, 1856)
- Orthalicus mars (Pfeiffer, 1861)

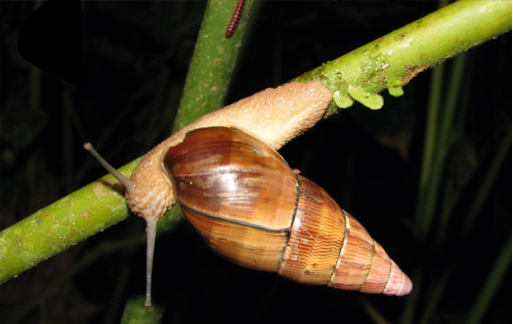
Corona pfeifferi

- Corona pfeifferi (Hidalgo, 1869)
- Corona regalis (Hupé, 1857)
- Corona regina (Férussac, 1823)
- Corona rosenbergi Strebel, 1909
- Porphyrobaphe iostoma (Sowerby, 1824)
- Porphyrobaphe saturnus (Pfeiffer, 1860)
- Porphyrobabphe irrorata (Reeve, 1849)
- Porphyrobaphe subirroratus (Da Costa, 1898)
- Hemibulimus excisus (Martens, 1885)
- Hemibulimus magnificus (Pfeiffer, 1848)

Solaropsidae

- Solaropsis selenostoma (Pfeiffer, 1854)

== See also ==
- List of marine molluscs of Ecuador
- List of non-marine molluscs of Colombia
- List of non-marine molluscs of Peru
