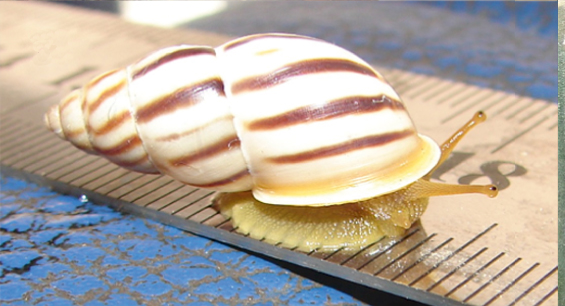

Scientific classification
- Domain: Eukaryota
- Kingdom: Animalia
- Phylum: Mollusca
- Class: Gastropoda
- Order: Stylommatophora
- Family: Bulimulidae
- Genus: Drymaeus
- Species: D. cecileae

Binomial name
- Drymaeus cecileae (M. J. Moricand, 1858)

Synonyms
- Bulimus cecileae Moricand, 1858

= Drymaeus cecileae =

Species of gastropod

Drymaeus cecileae is a species of tropical air-breathing land snail, a pulmonate gastropod mollusk in the family Bulimulidae.

== Distribution ==
Distribution of Drymaeus cecileae includes Peru: Loreto Region, Tarapoto (type locality), and Juan Guerra, on the Huallaga River.

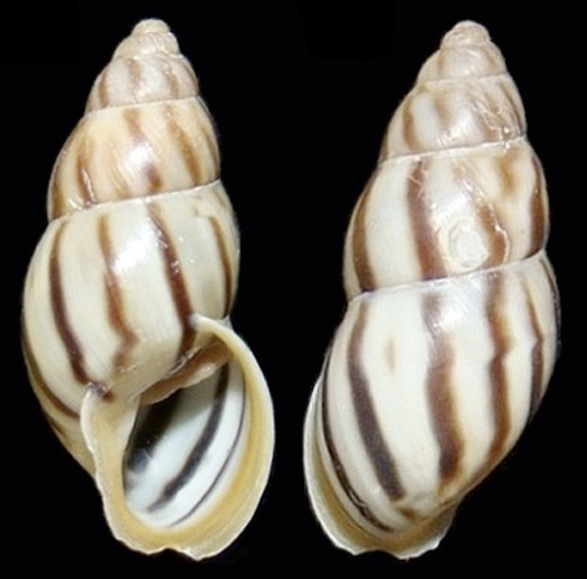
Apertural and abapertural view of the shell of Drymaeus cecileae. Shell height 21.0 mm.

== Description ==
The living animal is brownish-beige throughout, including the tentacles.

The shell is umbilicated, ovate-pyramidal, thin, translucid and shining. The color is pale buff, with elegant longitudinal narrow tawny streaks. The shell has 6 whorls, that are a little convex. The last whorl is about as long as the spire. The suture is impressed. The spire is conic and acute. The aperture is little oblique, oblong, and has a very pale lilac border within. The columella is slightly arcuate. The peristome is thin, expanded, buff or white, not continuous.

The width of the shell is 7–10 mm. The height of the shell is 17–22 mm.

Specimen by Breure (2010) corresponds to the description given by Pilsbry (1898). He regarded this taxon as a colour form of Drymaeus strigatus, which, however, has always a lilac band on the inside, bordering the peristome.

While Drymaeus species are known for their intraspecific variation in colour pattern, we here consider Drymaeus cecileae as a distinct taxon characterized by the more or less orange line behind the peristome, visible both on the inside and outside of the shell, and by being more slender than Drymaeus strigatus.
