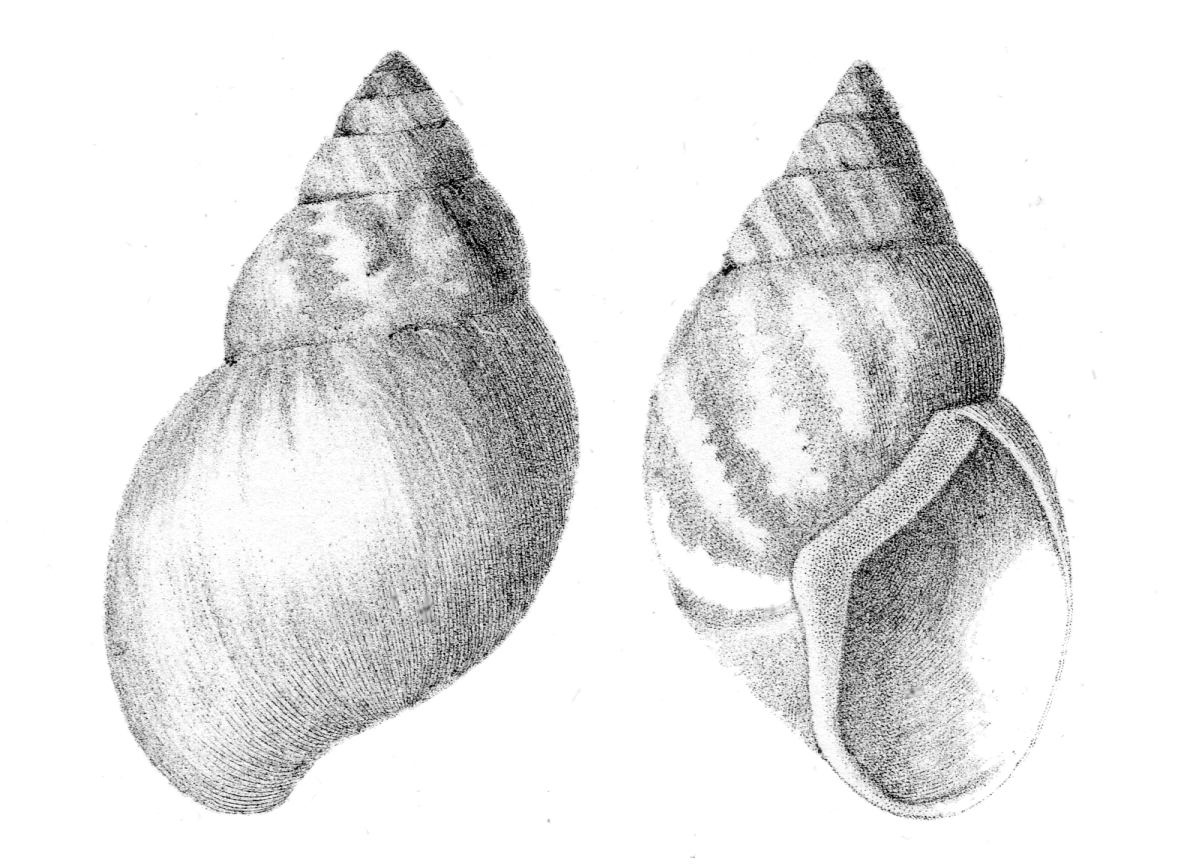
- Two views of a shell of Bulimulus alternatus mariae from Binney 1878

Scientific classification
- Kingdom: Animalia
- Phylum: Mollusca
- Class: Gastropoda
- Order: Stylommatophora
- Family: Bulimulidae
- Genus: Bulimulus
- Species: B. alternatus

Binomial name
- Bulimulus alternatus (Say, 1830)

= Bulimulus alternatus =

Species of gastropod

Bulimulus alternatus is a species of air-breathing land snail, a pulmonate gastropod mollusk in the family Bulimulidae.

== Subspecies ==
Subspecies include:

- Bulimulus alternatus mariae (Albers, 1850)
