= Bulimulus calvus =

Conservation status
- Vulnerable (IUCN 2.3)

Scientific classification
- Kingdom: Animalia
- Phylum: Mollusca
- Class: Gastropoda
- Order: Stylommatophora
- Family: Bulimulidae
- Genus: Bulimulus
- Species: B. calvus

Binomial name
- Bulimulus calvus Sowerby, 1833

Species of gastropod

Bulimulus calvus is a species of tropical air-breathing land snail, a pulmonate gastropod mollusc in the subfamily Bulimulinae.

This species is endemic to Ecuador. It is threatened by habitat loss.
