= B. darwini =

B. darwini may refer to:

- Berthelinia darwini, a snail species in the genus Berthelinia found in the Houtman Abrolhos
- Boursinidia darwini, a moth species
- Brachyleon darwini
- Bulimulus darwini, a tropical air-breathing land snail species

== See also ==
- B. darwinii (disambiguation)
- Darwini (disambiguation)
