= Neopetraeus filiolus =

Scientific classification
- Kingdom: Animalia
- Phylum: Mollusca
- Class: Gastropoda
- Order: Stylommatophora
- Family: Bulimulidae
- Genus: Neopetraeus
- Species: N. filiolus

Binomial name
- Neopetraeus filiolus (Pilsbry, 1897)

Synonyms
- Drymaeus (Neopetraeus) filiola Pilsbry, 1897

Species of gastropod

Neopetraeus filiolus is a species of tropical air-breathing land snail, a pulmonate gastropod mollusk in the family Orthalicidae.

== Distribution ==
Distribution of Neopetraeus filiolus include Ancash Region and Lima Region, Peru.
