= Bulimulus unifasciatus =

Conservation status
- Vulnerable (IUCN 2.3)

Scientific classification
- Kingdom: Animalia
- Phylum: Mollusca
- Class: Gastropoda
- Order: Stylommatophora
- Family: Bulimulidae
- Genus: Bulimulus
- Species: B. unifasciatus

Binomial name
- Bulimulus unifasciatus (Sowerby, 1833)

Species of gastropod

Bulimulus unifasciatus is a species of tropical air-breathing land snail, a pulmonate gastropod mollusk in the subfamily Bulimulinae.

This species is endemic to Ecuador. It is threatened by habitat loss.
