= Bulimulus amastroides =

Conservation status
- Vulnerable (IUCN 2.3)

Scientific classification
- Kingdom: Animalia
- Phylum: Mollusca
- Class: Gastropoda
- Order: Stylommatophora
- Family: Bulimulidae
- Genus: Bulimulus
- Species: B. amastroides

Binomial name
- Bulimulus amastroides (Ancey, 1887)

Species of gastropod

Bulimulus amastroides is a species of land snail in the family Bulimulidae. It is endemic to the Galápagos Islands.
