= Bulimulus pallidus =

Conservation status
- Data Deficient (IUCN 3.1)

Scientific classification
- Kingdom: Animalia
- Phylum: Mollusca
- Class: Gastropoda
- Order: Stylommatophora
- Family: Bulimulidae
- Genus: Bulimulus
- Species: B. pallidus

Binomial name
- Bulimulus pallidus (Reibisch, 1892)

Synonyms
- Naesiotus pallidus

Species of gastropod

Bulimulus pallidus is a species of tropical air-breathing land snail, a pulmonate gastropod mollusk in the subfamily Bulimulinae.

This species is endemic to Ecuador. Its natural habitat is subtropical or tropical dry forests. It is threatened by habitat loss.
