= Bulimulus blombergi =

Conservation status
- Vulnerable (IUCN 2.3)

Scientific classification
- Kingdom: Animalia
- Phylum: Mollusca
- Class: Gastropoda
- Order: Stylommatophora
- Family: Bulimulidae
- Genus: Bulimulus
- Species: B. blombergi

Binomial name
- Bulimulus blombergi Odhner, 1951

Species of gastropod

Bulimulus blombergi is a species of tropical air-breathing land snail in the subfamily Bulimulinae.

This species is endemic to Ecuador.
