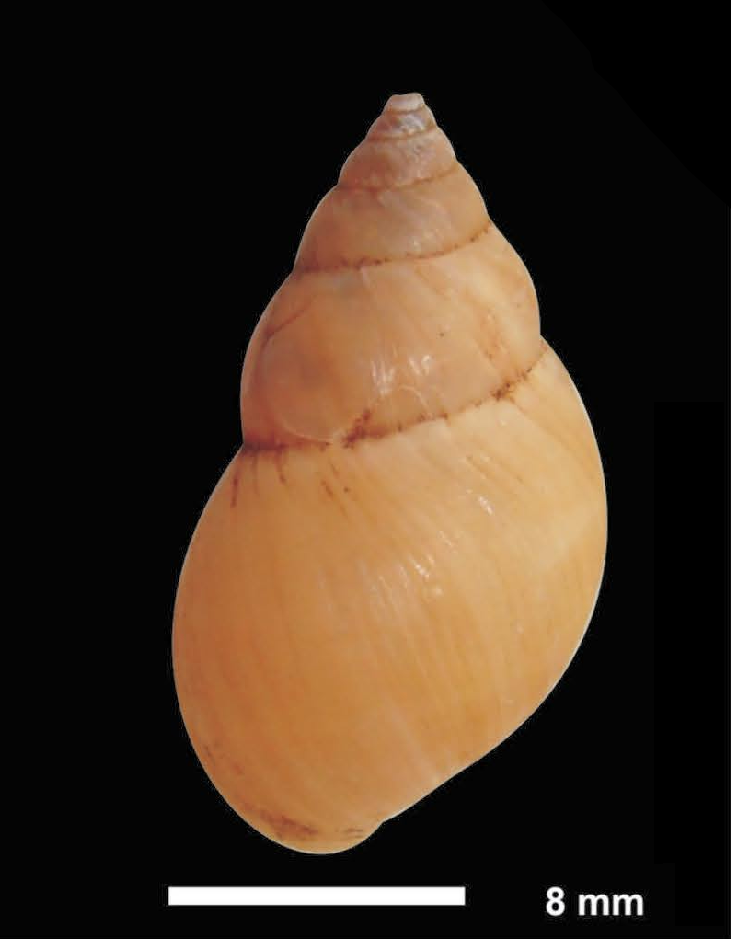
- Abapertural view of an adult shell of Bulimulus tenuissimus

Conservation status
- Secure (NatureServe)

Scientific classification
- Kingdom: Animalia
- Phylum: Mollusca
- Class: Gastropoda
- Order: Stylommatophora
- Family: Bulimulidae
- Genus: Bulimulus
- Species: B. tenuissimus

Binomial name
- Bulimulus tenuissimus (d’Orbigny, 1835)

Synonyms
- Helix tenuissima (Fér.) Orb., 1835

= Bulimulus tenuissimus =

Species of gastropod

Bulimulus tenuissimus is a species of tropical air-breathing land snail, a pulmonate gastropod mollusk in the subfamily Bulimulinae.

== Distribution ==
The native distribution of Bulimulus tenuissimus includes:

- Brazil – widespread in Brazil

The non-indigenous distribution includes:

- North Carolina, USA

== Description ==
The shell is perforate, ovate-conic, very thin, pellucid, scarcely shining, obsoletely and closely decussated by growth striae and delicate spiral lines. The shell is pale corneous in color, sometimes fulvous. The spire is conoid. The apex is rather acute. The suture is simple. The shell has six whorls that are slightly convex, increasing with moderate rapidity. The last whorl is convex, not descending in front, somewhat attenuated at base. The columella is suboblique, sometimes nearly vertical.

The aperture is oval, colored like the exterior, onehalf the shell's length. The peristome is simple, unexpanded, acute. The right margin is regularly arcuate. The columellar margin is reflexed above, nearly covering the perforation.

The width of the shell is 9 mm. The height of the shell is 17-23 mm.

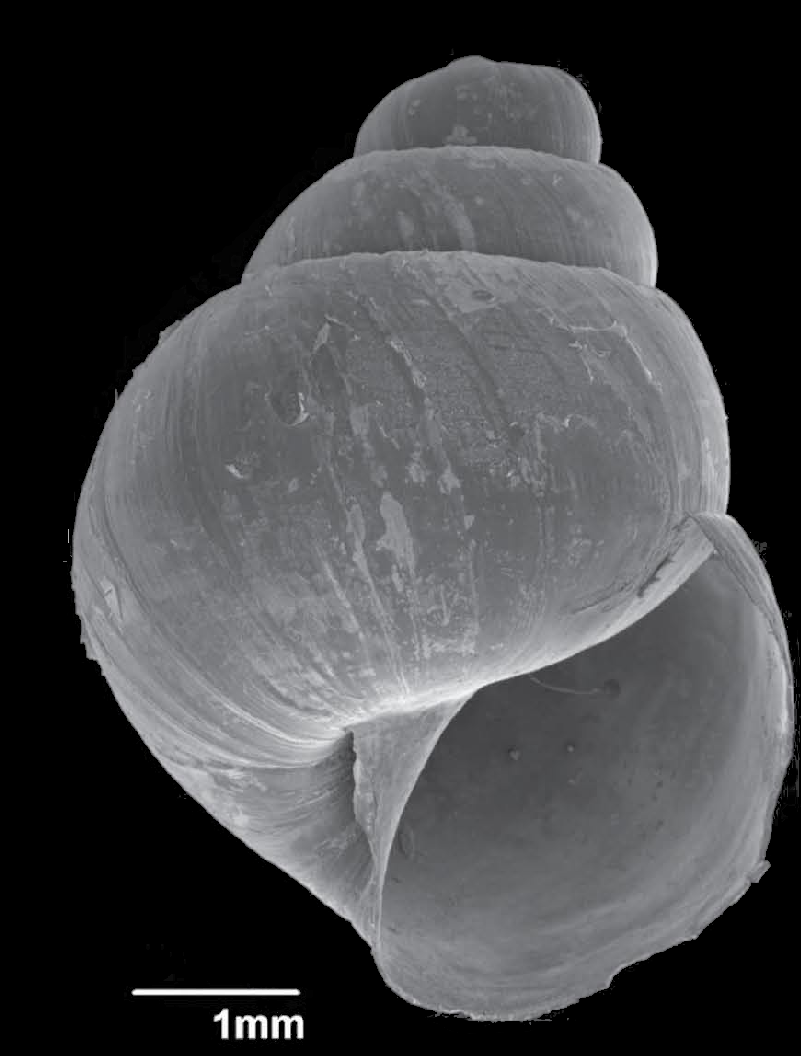
Apertural view of a juvenile shell of Bulimulus tenuissimus.

== Ecology ==
The reproductive biology of this species was studied by Silva et al. (2008): These hermaphroditic snails mate and cross-fertilization normally occurs. When snails are isolated self-fertilization can occur, but with the lower reproductive success.

A juvenile snail reaches adulthood at 160 days on average, with a shell size of 14-16 cm, after which the snail will begin laying eggs. The egg laying activity is highest in spring and summer months when there is higher heat and humidity, but eggs are produced year-around.

Eggs are laid in clutches from one to 252 eggs (in captivity). Snails hatch after about 20 days and over 50% of the egg clutch is expected to hatch. Despite the snail's relatively long lifespan of up to 990 days, the viability of eggs does not reduce as the snail ages, although egg production is lower.

Bulimulus tenuissimus is a host for a trematode of the genus Postharmostomum (family Brachylaimidae).

Strongyluris-like larvae are a parasite of Bulimulus tenuissimus.

Malacophagula neotropica (family Sarcophagidae) is a parasite of Bulimulus tenuissimus.

A firefly is a predator of Bulimulus tenuissimus.
