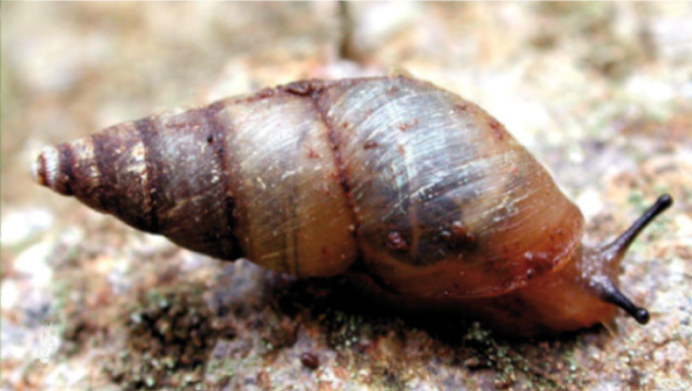

Scientific classification
- Kingdom: Animalia
- Phylum: Mollusca
- Class: Gastropoda
- Order: Stylommatophora
- Family: Bulimulidae
- Genus: Naesiotus
- Species: N. stenogyroides

Binomial name
- Naesiotus stenogyroides (Guppy, 1868)

Synonyms
- Bulimulus stenogyroides Guppy, 1868

= Naesiotus stenogyroides =

Species of gastropod

Naesiotus stenogyroides is a species of tropical air-breathing land snail, a pulmonate gastropod mollusk in the family Bulimulidae.

== Distribution ==
Naesiotus stenogyroides is endemic to Dominica. It is restricted to higher localities. It is very restricted in range and probably meet the IUCN-criteria of Critically Endangered species.

== Description ==
This species was described from a single, incomplete shell that was subsequently lost during a fire which destroyed Guppy’s collection in Port of Spain. The true status of this taxon has been enigmatic since its description, as no additional material has been reported. Breure (1974) considered Bulimulus stenogyroides a nomen dubium. The material recently collected in 2009 allowed to validate Guppy's name. It proves to belong to the genus Naesiotus, which has also been reported from neighbouring islands (Breure, 1975). A detailed study of the anatomy and a critical comparison with its congeners will be published later (Breure, in preparation).
