= Naesiotus bambamarcaensis =

Scientific classification
- Domain: Eukaryota
- Kingdom: Animalia
- Phylum: Mollusca
- Class: Gastropoda
- Order: Stylommatophora
- Family: Bulimulidae
- Genus: Naesiotus
- Species: N. bambamarcaensis

Binomial name
- Naesiotus bambamarcaensis Weyrauch, 1960

Species of gastropod

Naesiotus bambamarcaensis is a species of tropical air-breathing land snail, a pulmonate gastropod mollusk in the family Bulimulidae.

== Distribution ==
- Peru

The type locality is Cerro Machaipungo near Bambamarca. Breure (2010) have published another locality Chalamarca 06°29’29’S 078°28’07’W, Cajamarca Region, Peru, that is about 20 km SSW from the type locality.

== Description ==
The specimens from the Chalamarca locality are slightly smaller than the holotype and vary in their dimensions, but otherwise show the colour pattern characteristic for this species, viz. corneous-brown with a whitish spiral band at the periphery of the last whorl.
