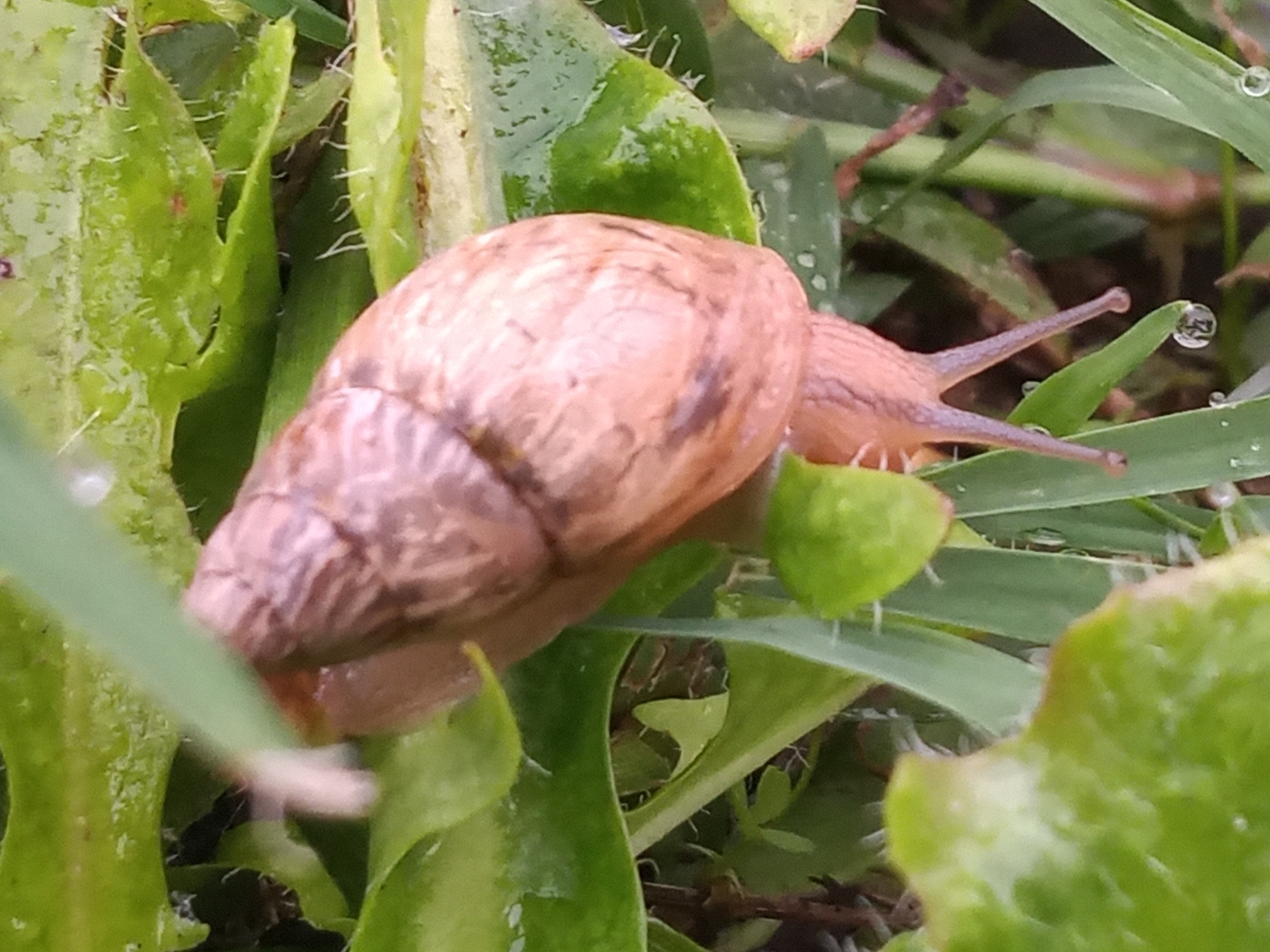

Scientific classification
- Kingdom: Animalia
- Phylum: Mollusca
- Class: Gastropoda
- Order: Stylommatophora
- Family: Bulimulidae
- Subfamily: Bulimulinae
- Genus: Bulimulus
- Species: B. bonariensis

Binomial name
- Bulimulus bonariensis (Rafinesque, 1833)

Synonyms
- Bulimulus (Bulimulus) sporadicus (d'Orbigny, 1835); Bulimulus (Bulimulus) sporadicus schadei Schlesch, 1835 (junior synonym); Bulimulus (Drymaeus) morenoi Preston, 1907 (junior synonym); Bulimulus gelidus Reeve, 1849 (junior synonym); Bulimulus montevidensis (L. Pfeiffer, 1846) (junior synonym); Bulimulus saltensis Holmberg, 1909 (junior synonym); Bulimulus sporadicus (d'Orbigny, 1835); bulimus montevidensis L. Pfeiffer, 1846 (junior synonym); Helix sporadica d'Orbigny, 1835 (junior synonym); Siphalomphix bonariensis Rafinesque, 1833 (original combination)

= Bulimulus bonariensis =

Species of land snail

Bulimulus bonariensis, the ghost Bulimulus, is a species of terrestrial snail in the family Bulimulidae.

== Description ==
These snails can reach approximately 2.5 cm in total length. Their shells are narrow and pointed with 5-7 whorls and are white or light yellowish brown in color. Sometimes the shell is marked with darker lines. The soft body is white or off-white, with darker gray pigmentation along the eyestalks.

== Range ==
Bulimulus bonariensis is native to southeastern South America, including Uruguay, northeastern Argentina, southern Paraguay, and the Atlantic coastal forests of Brazil from Rio Grande do Sul at least as far north as Espírito Santo state. There are also scattered records from northern South America (Ecuador, Colombia, Venezuela) and Central America (Panama, Nicaragua).

Bulimulus bonariensis has been introduced to the southeastern United States and is spreading rapidly. As of January 2024 it is widespread throughout Florida and coastal Alabama and around Houston, Texas, with scattered records from coastal Georgia, South Carolina, Mississippi, and Louisiana as well as around Austin and College Station, Texas, and in several other areas of eastern and southern Texas, as well as in Coahuila and Nuevo León.

These snails were first reported in Florida in the Jacksonville area in 2009 and had reached the western Florida panhandle by 2017.

== Ecology ==
Eggs are buried in the soil, usually in clutches containing 40 eggs at a time. Neonates will hatch from their soft, gelatinous shells about 2 weeks after laying. The shells are whitish but will turn brown a few days before hatching.

Adults are protogynous hermaphrodites, meaning female reproductive organs develop first followed by male reproductive organs. At full sexual maturity the snail is a simultaneous hermaphrodite. They can live for a little over one to three years and will start reproducing at 6 months old or approximately 12–17 mm in length. Most reproduction takes place in the spring within their native range.

The normal diet is dead and decaying plant matter. They tend to aggregate in moist microhabitats.

Bulimulus bonariensis is an emerging crop pest. Concerns include interfering with irrigation equipment by covering microjets and being sucked into peanut harvesting equipment, causing contamination. It does not normally consume crops, but may feed on crop plants at sites of previous damage (e.g., from frost or other herbivores) or on seedlings. Like other successful invasive species, high reproductive capacity, a generalist diet, and release from co-evolved enemies have probably contributed to its spread. They are apparently eaten by Limpkins.

== Taxonomy ==
Bulimulus bonariensis was originally described as Siphalomphix bonariensis by Rafinesque in 1833. The type locality is north-eastern Argentina.

The following subspecies are recognised:

- Bulimulus bonariensis bonariensis (Rafinesque, 1833)
- Bulimulus bonariensis sporadicus (d'Orbigny, 1835)

=== Etymology ===
The specific epithet bonariensis means 'from Buenos Aires, Argentina'.
