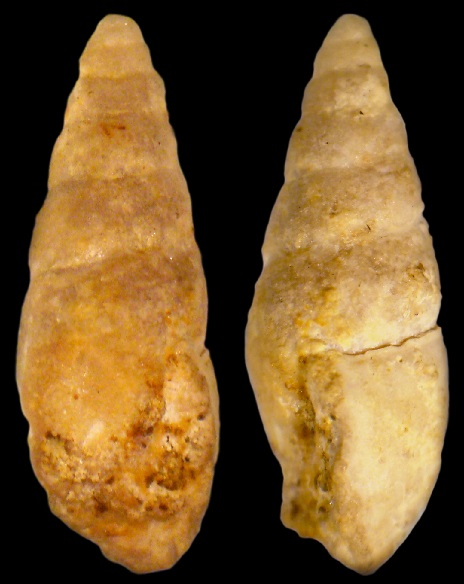
- Two views of a fossil shell of Bulimulus trindadeae

Scientific classification
- Domain: Eukaryota
- Kingdom: Animalia
- Phylum: Mollusca
- Class: Gastropoda
- Order: Stylommatophora
- Family: Bulimulidae
- Genus: Bulimulus
- Species: B. trindadeae

Binomial name
- Bulimulus trindadeae Ferreira & Coelho, 1971

Synonyms
- Itaborahia trindadeae

= Bulimulus trindadeae =

Bulimulus trindadeae Temporal range: Paleocene

Extinct species of gastropod

Bulimulus trindadeae is a fossil species of air-breathing land snail, a terrestrial pulmonate gastropod mollusk in the family Bulimulidae, from the Paleocene deposits of the Itaboraí Basin in Brazil.
