= Oxychona maculata =

Scientific classification
- Kingdom: Animalia
- Phylum: Mollusca
- Class: Gastropoda
- Order: Stylommatophora
- Family: Bulimulidae
- Genus: Oxychona
- Species: O. maculata

Binomial name
- Oxychona maculata Salvador & Cavallari, 2013

Species of gastropod

Oxychona maculata is a species of tropical air-breathing land snail, a pulmonate gastropod mollusc in the family Bulimulidae.

== Distribution ==
Oxychona maculata occurs in southern Bahia state, Brazil. It is only known from the municipalities of Ilhéus (the type locality) and Itapetinga.
