= Naesiotus pilsbryi =

Scientific classification
- Kingdom: Animalia
- Phylum: Mollusca
- Class: Gastropoda
- Order: Stylommatophora
- Family: Bulimulidae
- Genus: Naesiotus
- Species: N. pilsbryi

Binomial name
- Naesiotus pilsbryi Weyrauch, 1956

Species of gastropod

Naesiotus pilsbryi is a species of tropical air-breathing land snail, a pulmonate gastropod mollusk in the family Bulimulidae.

The name pilsbryi is in honor of American malacologist Henry Augustus Pilsbry.

== Distribution ==
- Peru

The type locality is Chagual, 07°50’S 077°38’W, 1275 m, La Libertad Region, Peru. This species is known from the type locality only and may be range-restricted.
