= Naesiotus akamatus =

Conservation status
- Vulnerable (IUCN 2.3)

Scientific classification
- Kingdom: Animalia
- Phylum: Mollusca
- Class: Gastropoda
- Order: Stylommatophora
- Family: Bulimulidae
- Genus: Naesiotus
- Species: N. akamatus

Binomial name
- Naesiotus akamatus (Dall, 1917)

Synonyms
- Bulimulus (Naesiotus) akamatus Dall, 1917

Species of gastropod

Naesiotus akamatus is a species of tropical air-breathing land snail, a pulmonate gastropod mollusk in the subfamily Bulimulinae.

This species is endemic to Ecuador.
