= Bulimulus hoodensis =

Conservation status
- Vulnerable (IUCN 3.1)

Scientific classification
- Kingdom: Animalia
- Phylum: Mollusca
- Class: Gastropoda
- Order: Stylommatophora
- Family: Bulimulidae
- Genus: Bulimulus
- Species: B. hoodensis

Binomial name
- Bulimulus hoodensis (Dall, 1893)

Species of gastropod

Bulimulus hoodensis is a species of land snail in the family Bulimulidae. It is endemic to Española Island, one of the Galápagos Islands. The species reproduces sexually.
