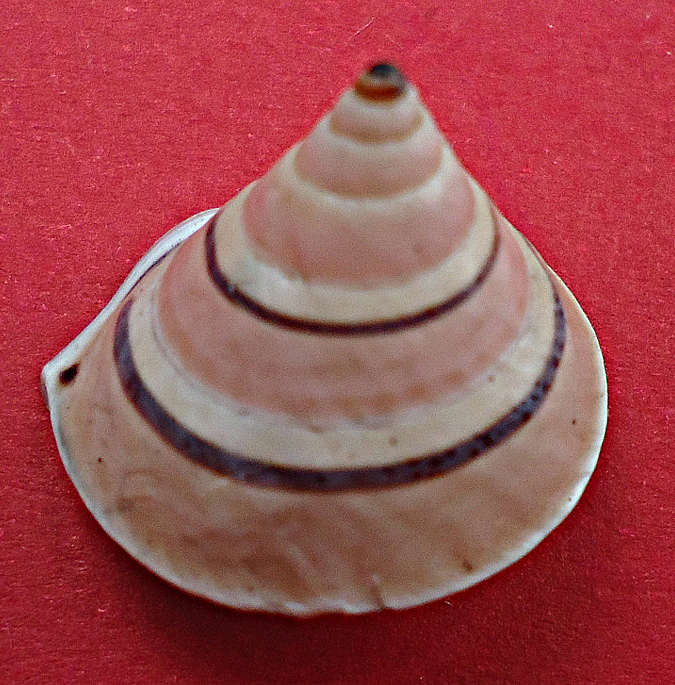
- A shell of Oxychona bifasciata from Bahia, Brazil

Scientific classification
- Domain: Eukaryota
- Kingdom: Animalia
- Phylum: Mollusca
- Class: Gastropoda
- Order: Stylommatophora
- Family: Bulimulidae
- Genus: Oxychona
- Species: O. bifaciata

Binomial name
- Oxychona bifaciata (Burrow, 1815)

= Oxychona bifasciata =

Oxychona bifaciata

Species of gastropod

Oxychona bifaciata is a species of tropical air-breathing land snail, a pulmonate gastropod mollusk in the family Bulimulidae.
