= Naesiotus alethorhytidus =

Conservation status
- Vulnerable (IUCN 2.3)

Scientific classification
- Kingdom: Animalia
- Phylum: Mollusca
- Class: Gastropoda
- Order: Stylommatophora
- Family: Bulimulidae
- Genus: Naesiotus
- Species: N. alethorhytidus

Binomial name
- Naesiotus alethorhytidus (Dall, 1917)

Synonyms
- Bulimulus (Naesiotus) alethorhytidus Dall, 1917

Species of gastropod

Naesiotus alethorhytidus is a species of tropical air-breathing land snail, a pulmonate gastropod mollusk in the subfamily Bulimulinae.

This species is endemic to Ecuador.
