= Bulimulus sp. nov. 'josevillani' =

Conservation status
- Critically endangered, possibly extinct (IUCN 3.1)

Scientific classification
- Kingdom: Animalia
- Phylum: Mollusca
- Class: Gastropoda
- Order: Stylommatophora
- Family: Bulimulidae
- Subfamily: Bulimulinae
- Genus: Bulimulus
- Species: B. sp. nov. 'josevillani'

Binomial name
- Bulimulus sp. nov. 'josevillani'

Species of gastropod

Bulimulus sp. nov. 'josevillani' is an undescribed species of tropical air-breathing land snail, a pulmonate gastropod mollusc in the subfamily Bulimulinae.

This species is endemic to Ecuador. Its natural habitat is Scalesia forests on Santa Cruz, an island of the Galápagos archipelago. It is threatened by habitat loss and introduced species. The invasive little fire ant, Wasmannia auropunctata, occurs on the island.
