= Bulimulus sp. nov. 'nilsodhneri' =

Conservation status
- Critically endangered, possibly extinct (IUCN 3.1)

Scientific classification
- Domain: Eukaryota
- Kingdom: Animalia
- Phylum: Mollusca
- Class: Gastropoda
- Order: Stylommatophora
- Family: Bulimulidae
- Subfamily: Bulimulinae
- Genus: Bulimulus
- Species: B. sp. nov. 'nilsodhneri'

Binomial name
- Bulimulus sp. nov. 'nilsodhneri'

Species of gastropod

Bulimulus sp. nov. 'nilsodhneri' is an undescribed species of tropical air-breathing land snail, a pulmonate gastropod mollusk in the subfamily Bulimulinae.

This species is endemic to Ecuador. Its natural habitats are subtropical or tropical dry shrubland and subtropical or tropical dry lowland grassland. It is threatened by habitat loss.

The specific name nilsodhneri is apparently in honor of Swedish malacologist Nils Hjalmar Odhner.
