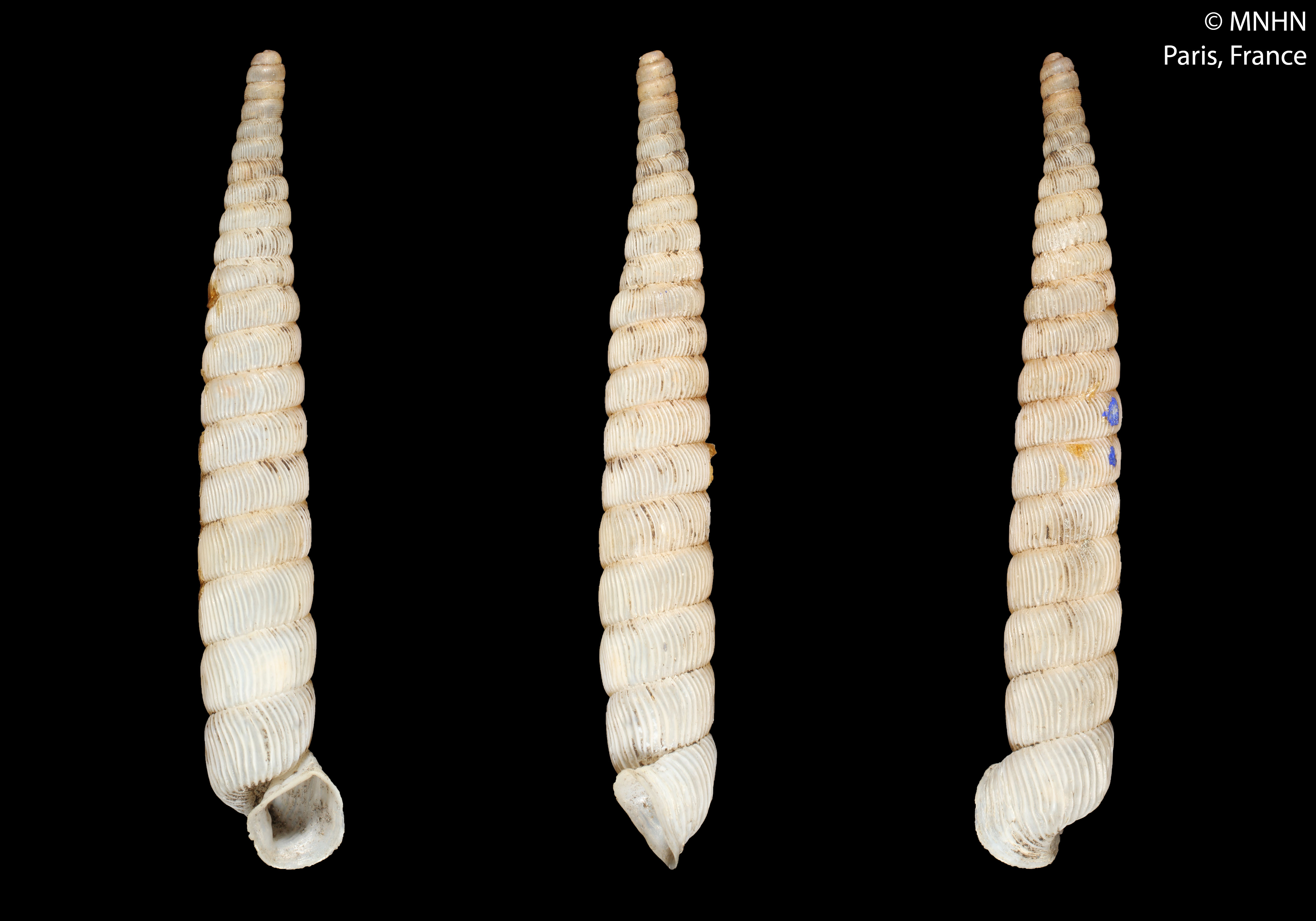
- Shell of Spartocentrum digueti (syntype at MNHN, Paris)

Scientific classification
- Kingdom: Animalia
- Phylum: Mollusca
- Class: Gastropoda
- Order: Stylommatophora
- Suborder: Helicina
- Superfamily: Orthalicoidea
- Family: Bulimulidae
- Genus: Spartocentrum; Dall, 1895

Type species
- Cylindrella irregularis Gabb, 1868

Synonyms
- Coelocentrum (Spartocentrum) Dall, 1895 (original rank); Teneritia J. Mabille, 1898

= Spartocentrum =

Genus of gastropods

Spartocentrum is a genus of air-breathing land snails, a terrestrial pulmonate gastropod mollusks in the subfamily Bulimulinae of the family Bulimulidae.

== Species ==
- Spartocentrum digueti (Mabille, 1895)
- Spartocentrum eisenianum (Pilsbry, 1900)
- Spartocentrum insulare (Hanna, 1923)
- Spartocentrum irregularis (Gabb, 1868)
- Spartocentrum vanduzeei (Hanna, 1923)
