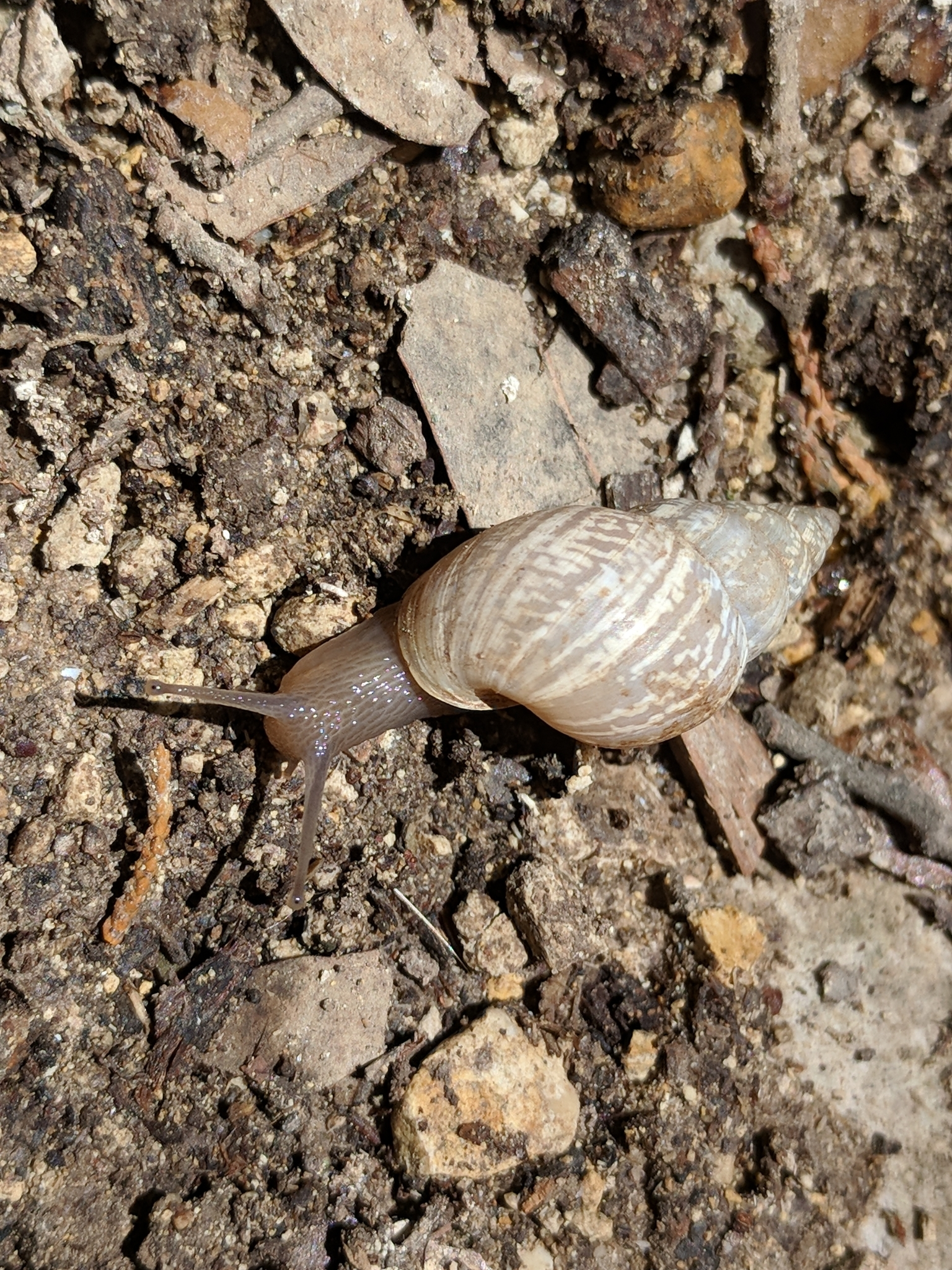
- Rabdotus dealbatus

Scientific classification
- Kingdom: Animalia
- Phylum: Mollusca
- Class: Gastropoda
- Order: Stylommatophora
- Suborder: Helicina
- Superfamily: Orthalicoidea
- Family: Bulimulidae
- Genus: Rabdotus; Albers, 1850

Synonyms
- Bulimulus (Rabdotus) Albers, 1850; Bulimulus (Rhabdotus) Albers, 1850 (unaccepted rank and incorrect subsequent spelling); Bulimus (Rabdotus) Albers, 1850 (original rank); Globulinus Crosse & P. Fischer, 1875; Hannarabdotus Emerson & Jacobson, 1964; Orthotomium Crosse & P. Fischer, 1875; Pseudorhodea Dall, 1895; Rabdotus (Leptobyrsus) Crosse & P. Fischer, 1875 · alternate representation; Rabdotus (Plicolumna) J.G. Cooper, 1895 · alternate representation; Rabdotus (Puritanina) Jacobson, 1958 · alternate representation; Rabdotus (Rabdotus) Albers, 1850 · alternate representation; Rhabdotus [sic] (incorrect subsequent spelling); Sonorina Pilsbry, 1896

= Rabdotus =

Genus of gastropods

Rabdotus is a genus of air-breathing land snails, terrestrial pulmonate gastropod mollusks in the subfamily Bulimulinae of the family Bulimulidae.

== Species ==
Species in the genus Rabdotus include:

- Rabdotus abbreviatus (Cooper, 1892)
- Rabdotus alternatus Say, 1830) - Striped Rabdotus
- Rabdotus artemisia (Binney, 1861)
- Rabdotus baileyi (Dall, 1893)
- Rabdotus ceralboensis (Hanna, 1923)
- Rabdotus chamberlini (Hanna, 1923)
- Rabdotus dealbatus (Say, 1821) - Whitewashed Rabdotus
- Rabdotus fonsecanus (Haas, 1961)
- Rabdotus inscendens (Binney, 1861)
- Rabdotus levis (Dall, 1893)
- Rabdotus mooreanus (L. Pfeiffer, 1868) - Prairie Rabdotus
- Rabdotus novoleonis (Pilsbry, 1953)
- Rabdotus perhirsutus W. B. Miller, Christensen & Roth, 1990
- Rabdotus pilsbryi (Ferriss, 1925)
- Rabdotus pilula (Binney, 1861)
- Rabdotus ramentosus (Cooper, 1991)
- Rabdotus schiedeanus (L. Pfeiffer, 1841)
- Rabdotus sufflatus (Gould, 1859)
- Rabdotus vegetus (Gould, 1853)
