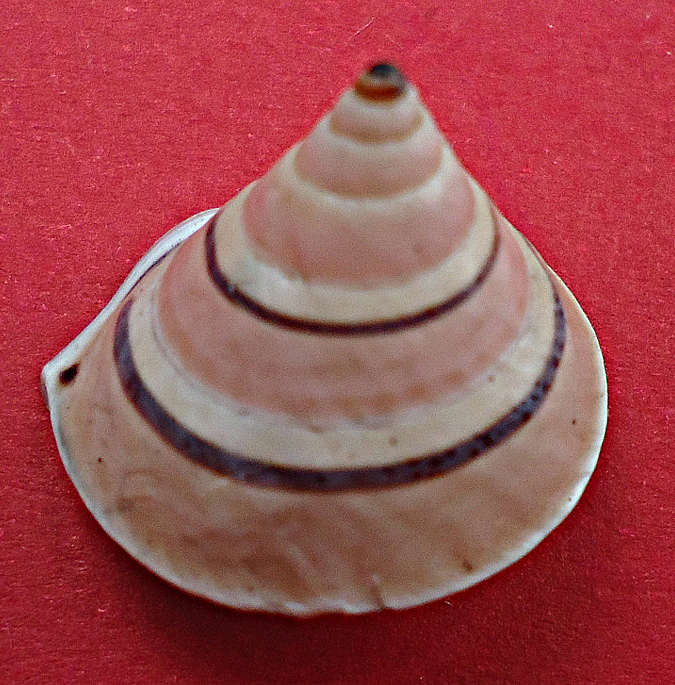
- A shell of Oxychona bifasciata from Bahia, Brazil'

Scientific classification
- Kingdom: Animalia
- Phylum: Mollusca
- Class: Gastropoda
- Order: Stylommatophora
- Suborder: Helicina
- Superfamily: Orthalicoidea
- Family: Bulimulidae
- Genus: Oxychona; Mörch, 1852

Type species
- Trochus bifasciatus Burrow, 1815

= Oxychona =

Genus of gastropods

Oxychona is a genus of air-breathing land snails, terrestrial pulmonate gastropod mollusks in the family Bulimulidae.

== Species ==
Species in the genus Oxychona include:

- Oxychona bifasciata (Burrow, 1815)
- Oxychona blanchetiana (Moricand, 1833)
- Oxychona bosciana (Férussac, 1832)
- Oxychona currani (Bartsch, 1916)
- Oxychona gyrina (Deshayes, 1850)
- Oxychona lonchostoma (Manke, 1828)
- Oxychona maculata Salvador & Cavallari, 2013
- Oxychona michelinae Porto, da Rocha, Johnsson & Neves, 2016
- Oxychona pyramidella (Spix, 1827)

Species brought into synonymy

- Oxychona layardi Hartman, 1889: synonym of Dendrotrochus (Santotrochus) layardi (Hartman, 1889) represented as Dendrotrochus layardi (Hartman, 1889) (original combination)
