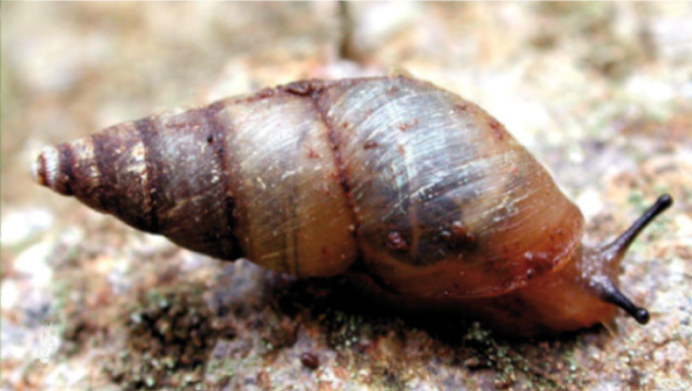
- Naesiotus stenogyroides

Scientific classification
- Kingdom: Animalia
- Phylum: Mollusca
- Class: Gastropoda
- Order: Stylommatophora
- Superfamily: Orthalicoidea
- Family: Bulimulidae
- Subfamily: Bulimulinae
- Genus: Naesiotus; J. C. Albers, 1850

Type species
- Bulimus nux Broderip, 1832

Synonyms
- Bulimulus (Naesiotus) Albers, 1850; Bulimulus (Pelecostoma) Reibisch, 1893 (original combination); Bulimus (Naesiotus) Albers, 1850 (original rank); Naesiotus (Adenodia) Dall, 1920· accepted, alternate representation; Naesiotus (Granella) Dall, 1920· accepted, alternate representation; Naesiotus (Granitza) Dall, 1920· accepted, alternate representation; Naesiotus (Granucis) Dall, 1920· accepted, alternate representation; Naesiotus (Maranhoniellus) Weyrauch, 1958· accepted, alternate representation; Naesiotus (Naesiotus) Albers, 1850· accepted, alternate representation; Naesiotus (Nuciscus) Dall, 1920· accepted, alternate representation; Naesiotus (Ochsneria) Dall, 1920· accepted, alternate representation; Naesiotus (Pelecostoma) Reibisch, 1893· accepted, alternate representation; Naesiotus (Pleuropyrgus) E. von Martens, 1860· accepted, alternate representation; Naesiotus (Reclasta) Dall, 1920· accepted, alternate representation; Naesiotus (Stemmodiscus) Dall, 1920· accepted, alternate representation; Nesiotes E. von Martens, 1860; Obstrussus Parodiz, 1946; Olinodia Dall, 1920; Rhaphiellus L. Pfeiffer, 1856; Saeronia Dall, 1920

= Naesiotus =

Genus of gastropods

Naesiotus is a genus of tropical air-breathing land snails, a pulmonate gastropod mollusks in the family Bulimulidae.

== Species ==
Species within the genus Naesiotus include:

- Naesiotus achatellinus (Forbes, 1850)
- Naesiotus adelphus (Dall, 1917)
- Naesiotus akamatus (Dall, 1917)
- Naesiotus albemarlensis (Dall, 1917)
- Naesiotus alethorhytidus (Dall, 1917)
- Naesiotus altus (Dall, 1893)
- Naesiotus amastroides (Ancey, 1887)
- Naesiotus andivagus Weyrauch, 1956
- Naesiotus arnaldoi (Lanzieri & Rezende, 1971)
- Naesiotus bambamarcaensis Weyrauch, 1960
- Naesiotus beldingi (Cooper, 1892)
- Naesiotus calchaquinus (Doering, 1879)
- Naesiotus calvus (G. B. Sowerby I, 1833)
- Naesiotus canaliferus (Reibisch, 1893)
- Naesiotus carlucioi (Rezende & Lanzieri, 1963)
- Naesiotus catlowiae (L. Pfeiffer, 1853)
- Naesiotus cavagnaroi A. G. Smith, 1972
- Naesiotus cerrateae Weyrauch, 1967
- Naesiotus chemnitzioides (Forbes, 1850)
- Naesiotus christenseni (W. B. Miller & Reeder, 1984)
- Naesiotus cinerarius (Dall, 1917)
- Naesiotus cosmicus (Mabille, 1895)
- Naesiotus crepundius (d'Orbigny, 1835)
- Naesiotus cutisculptus (Ancey, 1901)
- Naesiotus deletangi (Parodiz, 1946)
- Naesiotus dentifer (Mabille, 1895)
- Naesiotus durangoanus (E. von Martens, 1893)
- Naesiotus elegantulus Weyrauch, 1956
- Naesiotus eos (Odhner, 1951)
- Naesiotus eschariferus (G. B. Sowerby I, 1838)
- Naesiotus eudioptus (Ihering in Pilsbry, 1897)
- Naesiotus excelsus (Gould, 1853)
- Naesiotus exornatus Reeve, 1849
- Naesiotus fernandezae Weyrauch, 1958
- Naesiotus gabbi (Crosse & P. Fischer, 1872)
- Naesiotus galapaganus (L. Pfeiffer, 1855)
- Naesiotus geophilus Weyrauch, 1967
- Naesiotus gigantensis (Christensen & W. B. Miller, 1977)
- Naesiotus gracillimus Weyrauch, 1956
- Naesiotus haasi Weyrauch, 1956
- Naesiotus haematospira (Pilsbry, 1900)
- Naesiotus hannai (Pilsbry, 1927)
- Naesiotus harribaueri (Jacobson, 1958)
- Naesiotus jacobi (G. B. Sowerby I, 1833)
- Naesiotus laevapex (Christensen & W. B. Miller, 1977)
- Naesiotus lopesi (Rezende, Lanzieri & Inada, 1972)
- Naesiotus lycodus (Dall, 1917)
- Naesiotus milleri (Hoffman, 1987)
- Naesiotus montezuma (Dall, 1893)
- Naesiotus montivagus (d'Orbigny, 1835)
- Naesiotus munsterii (d'Orbigny, 1837)
- Naesiotus nigromontanus (Dall, 1897)
- Naesiotus nuciformis (S.A.A. Petit De La Saussaye, 1853) (synonym: Bulimus nuciformis Petit, 1853)
- Naesiotus nuculus (L. Pfeiffer, 1854)
- Naesiotus nux (Broderip, 1832)
- Naesiotus ochsneri (Dall, 1917)
- Naesiotus oxylabris (Doering, 1879)
- Naesiotus pachys (Pilsbry, 1897)
- Naesiotus pallidior (G. B. Sowerby I, 1833)
- Naesiotus pallidus (Reibisch, 1893)
- Naesiotus pazianus (D'Orbigny, 1835)
- Naesiotus perspectivus (L. Pfeiffer, 1846)
- Naesiotus pilsbryi Weyrauch, 1956
- Naesiotus pollonerae (Ancey, 1897)
- Naesiotus quitensis (Pfeiffer, 1848) –
- Naesiotus reibischi (Dall, 1895)
- Naesiotus rhabdotus (Haas, 1951)
- Naesiotus rimatus (L. Pfeiffer, 1847)
- Naesiotus rivasii (d'Orbigny, 1837)
- Naesiotus rocayanus (d'Orbigny, 1835)
- Naesiotus rugatinus (Dall, 1917)
- Naesiotus rugiferus (G.B. Sowerby I, 1833) (synonym: Bulimus rugiferus Sowerby I, 1833)
- Naesiotus rugulosus (G. B. Sowerby I, 1838)
- Naesiotus sculpturatus (L. Pfeiffer, 1846)
- Naesiotus silvaevagus Weyrauch, 1960
- Naesiotus spirifer (Gabb, 1868)
- Naesiotus stenogyroides (Guppy, 1868) – endemic to Dominica
- Naesiotus subcostatus (Haas, 1948)
- Naesiotus tanneri (Dall, 1895)
- Naesiotus tarmensis Weyrauch, 1967
- Naesiotus trichodes (A.V.M.D. D'Orbigny, 1835)
- Naesiotus turritus Weyrauch, 1967
- Naesiotus unifasciatus (G. B. Sowerby I, 1833)
- Naesiotus ustulatus (G. B. Sowerby I, 1833)
- Naesiotus ventrosus (Reibisch, 1893)
- Naesiotus veseyianus (Dall, 1893)
- Naesiotus vestalis (Albers, 1854)
- Naesiotus willinki Breure, 1978
- Naesiotus wolfi (Reibisch, 1893)
- Naesiotus xantusi (Binney, 1861)
- Naesiotus zilchi Weyrauch, 1956

Species brought into synonymy

- Naesiotus bicolor Weyrauch, 1967: synonym of Bostryx bicolor (Weyrauch, 1967)
- Naesiotus chrysalis (L. Pfeiffer, 1847): synonym of Protoglyptus chrysalis (L. Pfeiffer, 1847) (unaccepted combination)
- Naesiotus eudioptus (Ihering in Pilsbry, 1897): synonym of Simpulopsis eudioptus (Ihering in Pilsbry, 1897) (superseded combination)
- Naesiotus latecolumellaris Weyrauch, 1967: synonym of Bostryx latecolumellaris (Weyrauch, 1967) (original combination)
- * Naesiotus luciae (Pilsbry, 1897) : synonym of Protoglyptus luciae (Pilsbry, 1897)
- Naesiotus martinicensis (L. Pfeiffer, 1846): synonym of Protoglyptus martinicensis (L. Pfeiffer, 1846) (unaccepted combination)
- Naesiotus mazei (Crosse, 1874): synonym of Protoglyptus mazei (Crosse, 1874) (unaccepted combination)
- Naesiotus pilosus (Guppy, 1871): synonym of Protoglyptus pilosus (Guppy, 1871) (unaccepted combination)
- Naesiotus sanctaeluciae (E. A. Smith, 1889): synonym of Protoglyptus sanctaeluciae (E. A. Smith, 1889) (unaccepted combination)

== Distribution ==
Distribution of the genus Naesiotus include Ecuador, Colombia, Dominica (1 species), Peru, ...

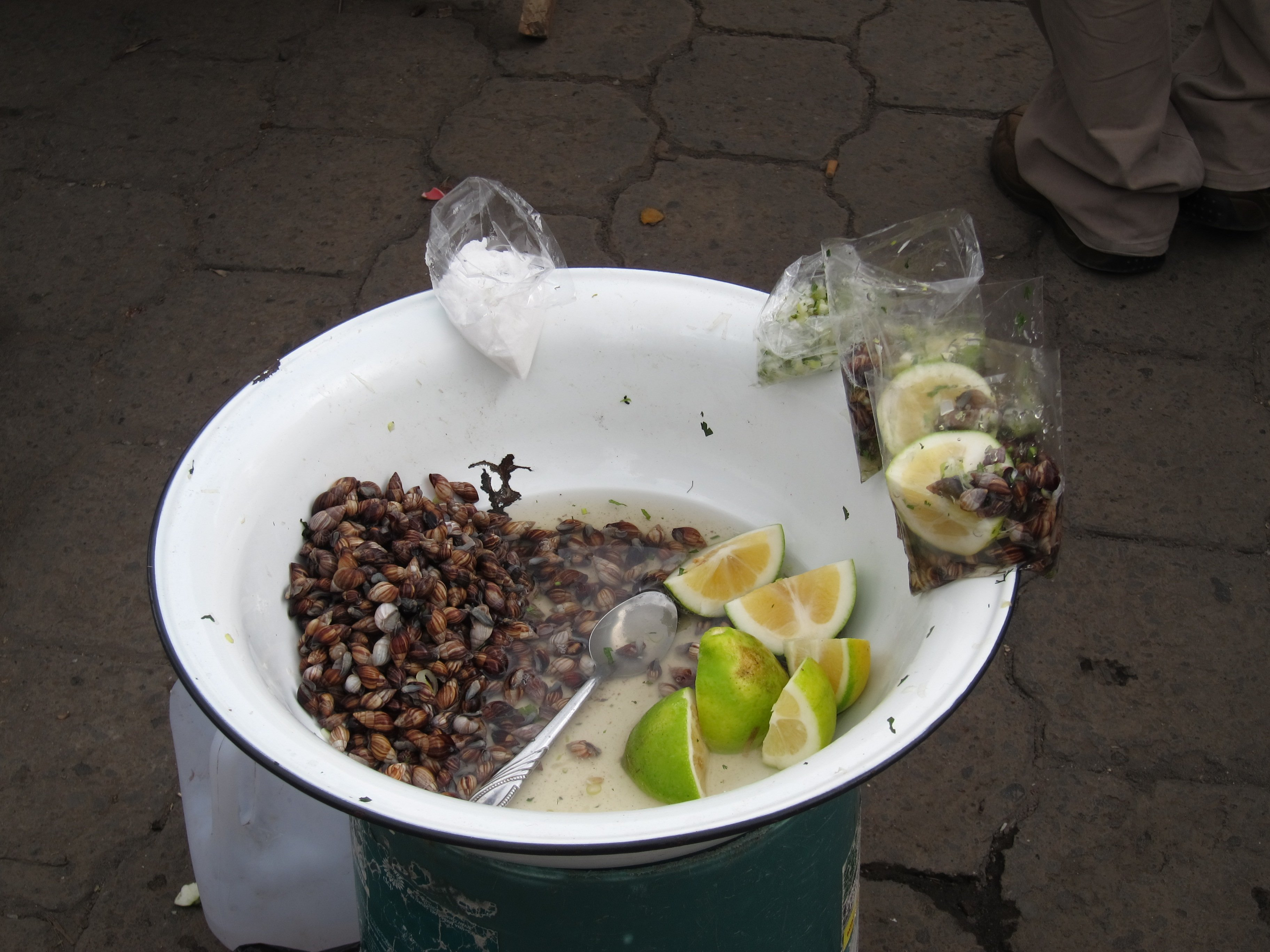
Raw snails Naesiotus sp. being sold for consumption in local market in Ecuador.

== Human use ==
People are sometimes consuming them raw, but consumption of raw snails is not recommended because snails can be vector of number of parasites.
