= Neopetraeus =

Scientific classification
- Kingdom: Animalia
- Phylum: Mollusca
- Class: Gastropoda
- Order: Stylommatophora
- Family: Bulimulidae
- Genus: Neopetraeus; Martens, 1885

Genus of land snails

Neopetraeus is a genus of gastropods belonging to the family Bulimulidae.

The species of this genus are found in Central and Southern America.

Species:

- Neopetraeus altoperuvianus (Reeve, 1849)
- Neopetraeus arboriferus Pilsbry, 1898
- Neopetraeus atahualpa (Dohrn, 1863)
- Neopetraeus binneyanus (L.Pfeiffer, 1857)
- Neopetraeus camachoi Weyrauch, 1967
- Neopetraeus catamarcanus (L.Pfeiffer, 1858)
- Neopetraeus cora (d'Orbigny, 1835)
- Neopetraeus decussatus (Reeve, 1849)
- Neopetraeus excoriatus (L.Pfeiffer, 1855)
- Neopetraeus filiolus (Pilsbry, 1897)
- Neopetraeus heterogyrus (Philippi, 1869)
- Neopetraeus lobbii (Reeve, 1849)
- Neopetraeus patasensis (L.Pfeiffer, 1858)
- Neopetraeus platystomus (L.Pfeiffer, 1858)
- Neopetraeus tessellatus (Shuttleworth, 1852)
- Neopetraeus vadum Pilsbry, 1898
