= Bulimulus sp. nov. 'tuideroyi' =

Conservation status
- Critically endangered, possibly extinct (IUCN 3.1)

Scientific classification
- Kingdom: Animalia
- Phylum: Mollusca
- Class: Gastropoda
- Order: Stylommatophora
- Suborder: Helicina
- Superfamily: Orthalicoidea
- Family: Bulimulidae
- Subfamily: Bulimulinae
- Genus: Bulimulus
- Species: B. sp. nov. 'tuideroyi'

Binomial name
- Bulimulus sp. nov. 'tuideroyi'

Species of gastropod

Bulimulus sp. nov. 'tuideroyi' is a species of tropical air-breathing land snail, a pulmonate gastropod mollusc in the subfamily Bulimulinae.

This species is endemic to Ecuador. Its natural habitat is tropical dry Scalesia forests on Santa Cruz, an island of the Galápagos archipelago. It is threatened by habitat loss by the expansion of farming.
