= Berendtia (gastropod) =

- Shell of Berendtia minorina (syntype at MNHN, Paris)

Scientific classification
- Kingdom: Animalia
- Phylum: Mollusca
- Class: Gastropoda
- Order: Stylommatophora
- Suborder: Helicina
- Superfamily: Orthalicoidea
- Family: Bulimulidae
- Genus: Berendtia; Crosse & P. Fischer, 1869

Genus of gastropods

Berendtia is a genus of tropical air-breathing land snails, a pulmonate gastropod mollusks in the family Bulimulidae.

== Species ==
Species within the genus Berendtia include:

- Berendtia minorina Mabille, 1895
- Berendtia taylori (L. Pfeiffer, 1861)
