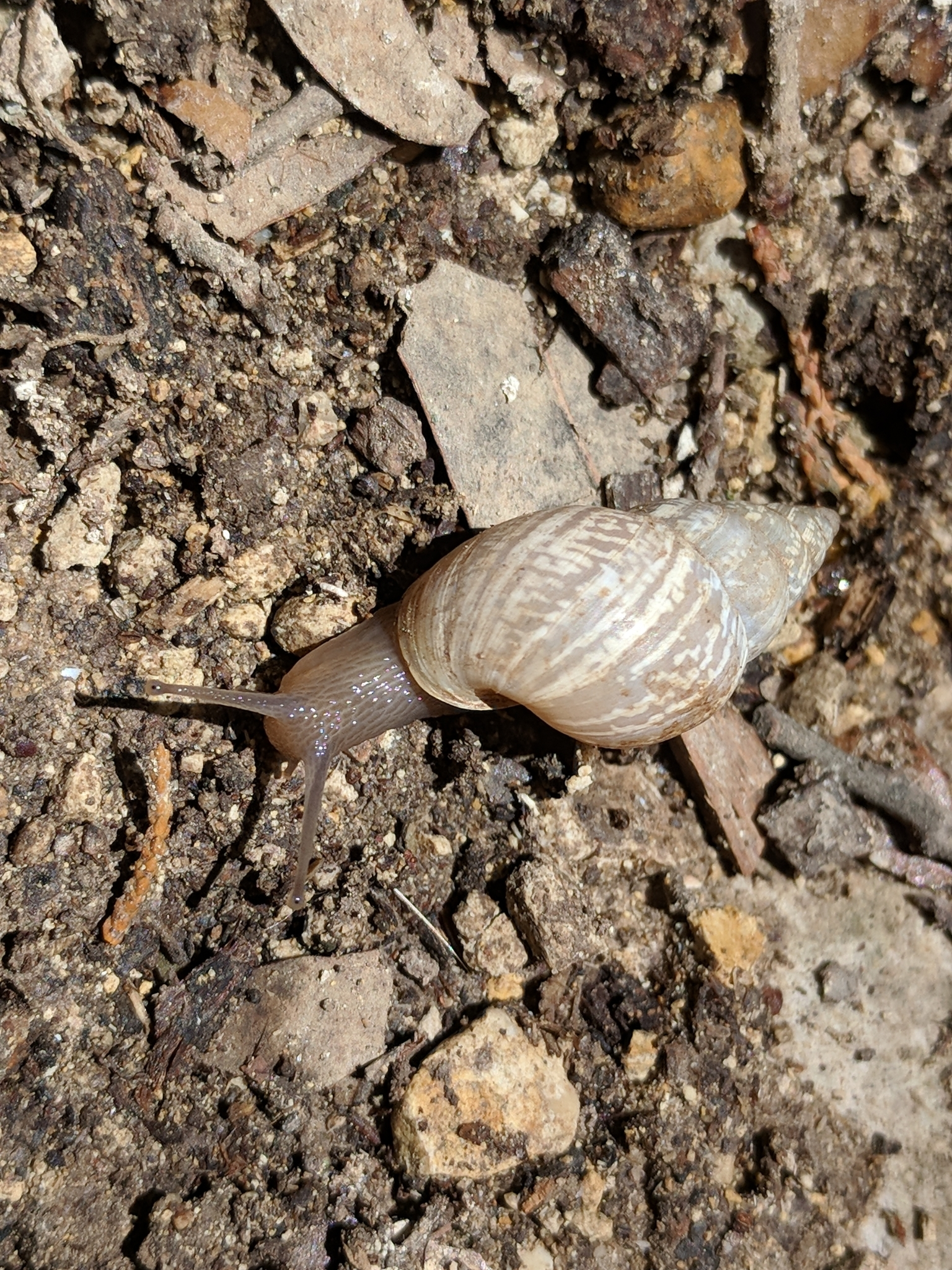

Conservation status
- Secure (NatureServe)

Scientific classification
- Kingdom: Animalia
- Phylum: Mollusca
- Class: Gastropoda
- Order: Stylommatophora
- Family: Bulimulidae
- Genus: Rabdotus
- Species: R. dealbatus

Binomial name
- Rabdotus dealbatus (Say, 1821)

Synonyms
- Bulimulus (Rabdotus) dealbatus (Say, 1821); Bulimulus dealbatus (Say, 1821); Helix dealbata Say, 1821 (original combination); Rabdotus (Rabdotus) dealbatus (Say, 1821) accepted, alternate representation

= Rabdotus dealbatus =

Species of gastropod

Rabdotus dealbatus is a species of tropical, air-breathing land snail in the family Bulimulidae.
