= B. darwinii =

B. darwinii may refer to:

- Baccharis darwinii
- Berberis darwinii, Darwin's Barberry, or Michay
- Botryocladia darwinii

== See also ==
- B. darwini (disambiguation)
- Darwinii (disambiguation)
