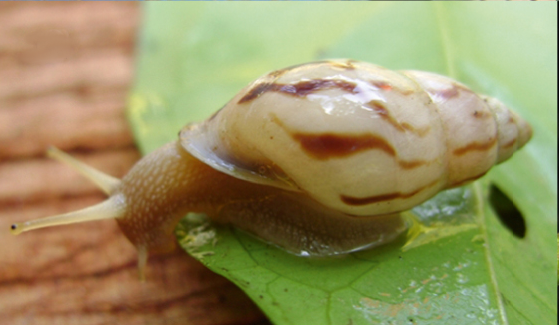

Scientific classification
- Kingdom: Animalia
- Phylum: Mollusca
- Class: Gastropoda
- Order: Stylommatophora
- Family: Bulimulidae
- Genus: Drymaeus
- Species: D. strigatus

Binomial name
- Drymaeus strigatus (Sowerby I, 1838)

Synonyms
- Bulinus strigatus Sowerby, 1838; Drymaeus tigrinus Da Costa, 1898

= Drymaeus strigatus =

Species of gastropod

Drymaeus strigatus is a species of tropical air-breathing land snail, a pulmonate gastropod mollusk in the family Bulimulidae.

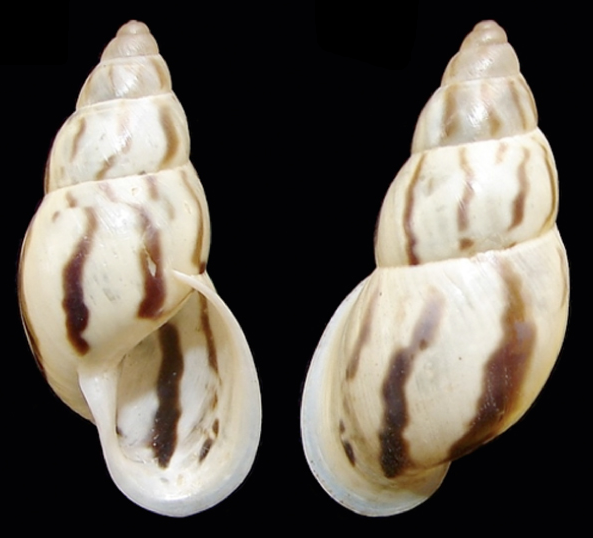
Shell of Drymaeus strigatus (shell height 21.7 mm)

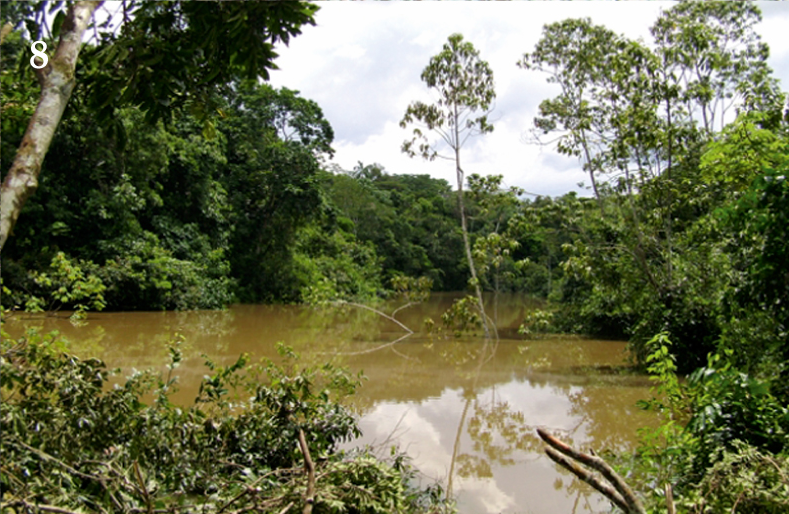
Habitat of Drymaeus strigatus

== Distribution ==
- Peru
- Ecuador

== Description ==
The living animal is brownish-beige, slightly darker just above the foot. The tentacles are whitish at the base and turning light-beige towards the eyes.
