= Bocourtia =

- Shell of Bocourtia anthisanensis (syntype at MNHN, Paris)

Scientific classification
- Kingdom: Animalia
- Phylum: Mollusca
- Class: Gastropoda
- Order: Stylommatophora
- Suborder: Helicina
- Superfamily: Orthalicoidea
- Family: Bulimulidae
- Genus: Bocourtia; Rochebrune, 1882

Type species
- Bocourtia lymnaeformis Rochebrune, 1882

Synonyms
- Bocourtia (Bocourtia) Rochebrune, 1882; Bocourtia (Kuschelenia) Hylton Scott, 1951; Kuschelenia Hylton Scott, 1951; Kuschelenia (Bocourtia) Rochebrune, 1882; Kuschelenia (Kuschelenia) Hylton Scott, 1951; Kuschelenia (Vermiculatus) Breure, 1978 (junior synonym); Scutalus (Kuschelenia) Hylton Scott, 1951; Scutalus (Vermiculatus) Breure, 1978 (junior synonym)

Genus of gastropods

Bocourtia is a genus of tropical air-breathing land snails, a pulmonate gastropod mollusks in the subfamily Bulimulinae of the family Bulimulidae.

== Characteristics ==
(Original description in Latin) The shell is imperforate and ovate-oblong in shape. It is furrowed with grooves and possesses somewhat ventricose whorls, which are covered by a tawny-colored epidermis. The columella is slightly callous and curved. The aperture is ovate-elliptic, while the outer lip is straight and simple.

== Species ==
Species within the genus Bocourtia include:

- Bocourtia aequatorius (L. Pfeiffer, 1853)
- Bocourtia alauda (Hupé, 1857)
- Bocourtia altorum (Haas, 1951)
- Bocourtia angrandi (Morelet, 1860)
- Bocourtia anthisanensis (L. Pfeiffer, 1854)
- Bocourtia aquila (Reeve, 1848)
- Bocourtia aurea (Breure, 1978)
- Bocourtia badia (G. B. Sowerby I, 1835)
- Bocourtia bicolor (G. B. Sowerby I, 1835)
- † Bocourtia bonariensis Miquel, 2019
- Bocourtia caliginosa (Reeve, 1849)
- Bocourtia coagulata (Reeve, 1849)
- Bocourtia confusa (Reeve, 1848)
- Bocourtia costifer (Pilsbry, 1932)
- Bocourtia costulata (Weyrauch, 1967)
- Bocourtia cotopaxiensis (L. Pfeiffer, 1853)
- Bocourtia culminea (d'Orbigny, 1835)
- Bocourtia cuzcoensis (Weyrauch, 1967)
- Bocourtia edwardsi (Morelet, 1863)
- Bocourtia filaris (L. Pfeiffer, 1854)
- Bocourtia gayi (L. Pfeiffer, 1857)
- Bocourtia hendeensis (Pilsbry, 1926)
- † Bocourtia leonardodavincii Miquel, 2024
- Bocourtia lithoica (d'Orbigny, 1835)
- Bocourtia longitudinalis (Haas, 1955)
- Bocourtia macedoi (Weyrauch, 1967)
- Bocourtia minuta (Breure, 1978)
- Bocourtia nemorensis (Philippi, 1867)
- Bocourtia ochracea (Morelet, 1863)
- Bocourtia peakei (Breure, 1978)
- Bocourtia petiti (L. Pfeiffer, 1846)
- Bocourtia pluto (Crosse, 1869)
- Bocourtia polymorpha (d'Orbigny, 1835)
- Bocourtia promethus (Crosse, 1869)
- Bocourtia purpurata (Reeve, 1849)
- Bocourtia pyramidalis (Breure, 1978)
- Bocourtia revinctus (Hupé, 1857)
- Bocourtia thamnoica (d'Orbigny, 1835)
- Bocourtia tupacii (d'Orbigny, 1835)
- Bocourtia weddellii (Hupé, 1857)

Species brought into synonymy

- Bocourtia lymnaeformis Rochebrune, 1881: synonym of Bocourtia anthisanensis (L. Pfeiffer, 1854)
