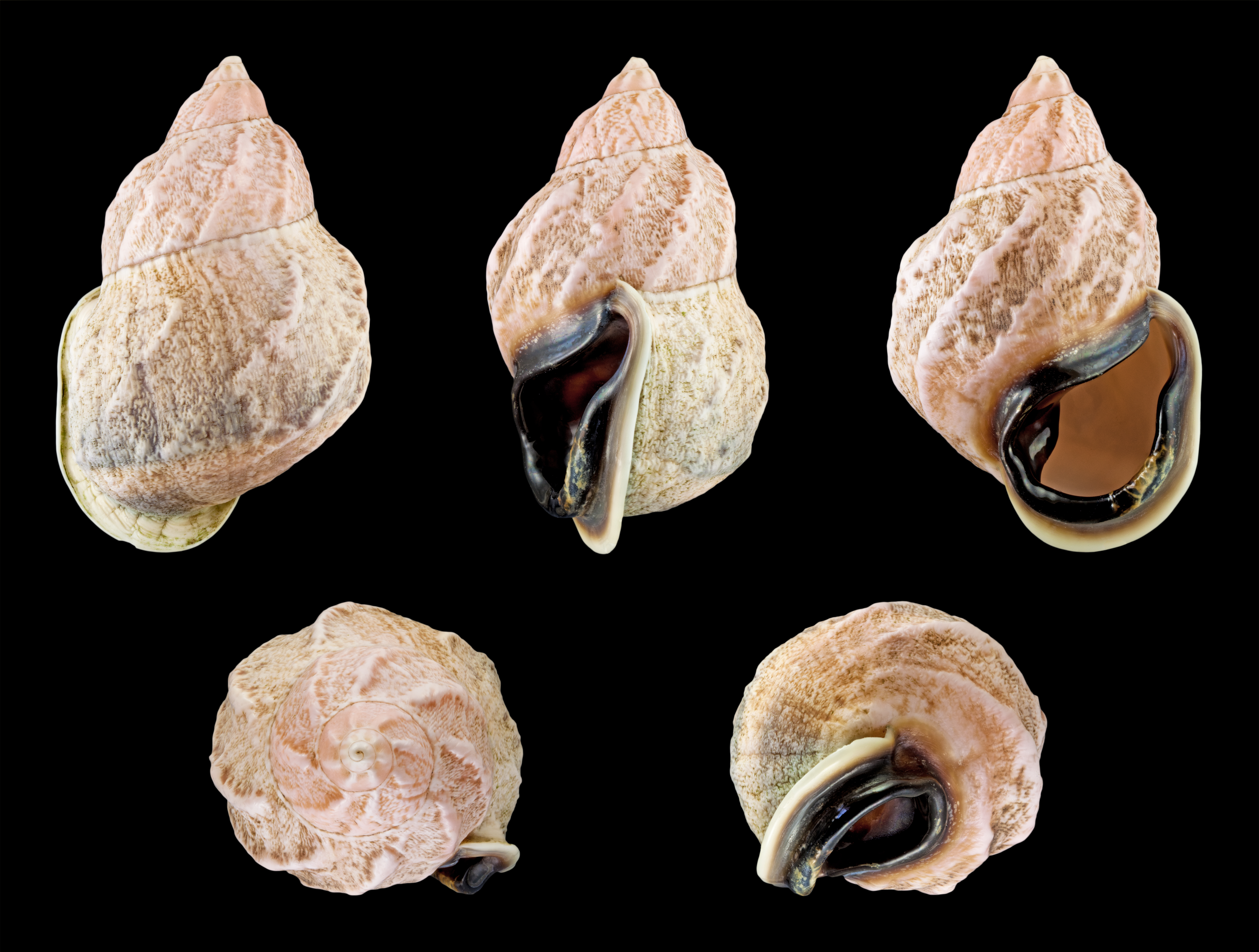
- Shell of Auris melanostoma

Scientific classification
- Kingdom: Animalia
- Phylum: Mollusca
- Class: Gastropoda
- Order: Stylommatophora
- Suborder: Helicina
- Superfamily: Orthalicoidea
- Family: Bulimulidae
- Genus: Auris; Spix, 1827

Type species
- Bulimus melastomus Swainson, 1820

Synonyms
- Bulimus (Pachyotus) H. Beck, 1837 (Invalid: junior homonym of Pachyotus Gray, 1831 [Mammalia]); Pachyotus H. Beck, 1837

= Auris (gastropod) =

Genus of gastropods

Auris is a genus of small to medium-sized tropical or sub-tropical, air-breathing land snails, pulmonate gastropod mollusks in the subfamily Bulimulinae within the family Bulimulidae.

== Species ==
Species in the genus Bulimulus include:

- Auris bernardii (L. Pfeiffer, 1856)
- Auris bilabiata (Broderip & G. B. Sowerby I, 1830)
- Auris brachyplax Pilsbry, 1896
- Auris chrysostoma (Moricand, 1836)
- Auris egregia (Jay, 1836)
- Auris icterostoma (E. v. Martens, 1901)
- Auris illheocola (Moricand, 1836)
- Auris melanostoma (Moricand, 1836)
- Auris melastoma (Swainson, 1820)
- Auris nigrilabris Pilsbry, 1896

Species brought into synonymy

- Auris distorta (Bruguière, 1789): synonym of Plekocheilus distortus (Bruguière, 1789)
- Auris signata Spix in Wagner, 1827: synonym of Otostomus signatus (Spix in Wagner, 1827) (basionym)
