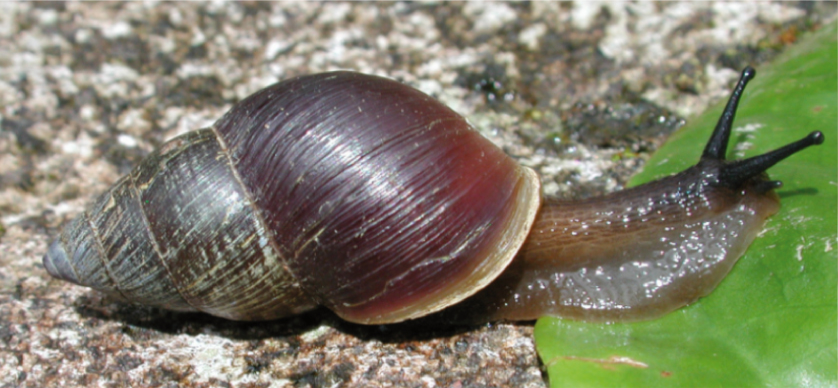
- Bulimulus limnoides

Scientific classification
- Kingdom: Animalia
- Phylum: Mollusca
- Class: Gastropoda
- Order: Stylommatophora
- Superfamily: Orthalicoidea
- Family: Bulimulidae
- Subfamily: Bulimulinae
- Genus: Bulimulus; Leach, 1814

Synonyms
- Adzharia P. Hesse, 1933; Bulimulus (Bulimulus) Leach, 1814; Bulimus (Leptomerus) Albers, 1850; Cochlogena Férussac, 1821 (junior synonym); Helix (Cochlogena) Férussac, 1821; Leptomerus Albers, 1850; Loboa Ihering, 1917; Siphalomphix Rafinesque, 1833

= Bulimulus =

Genus of gastropods

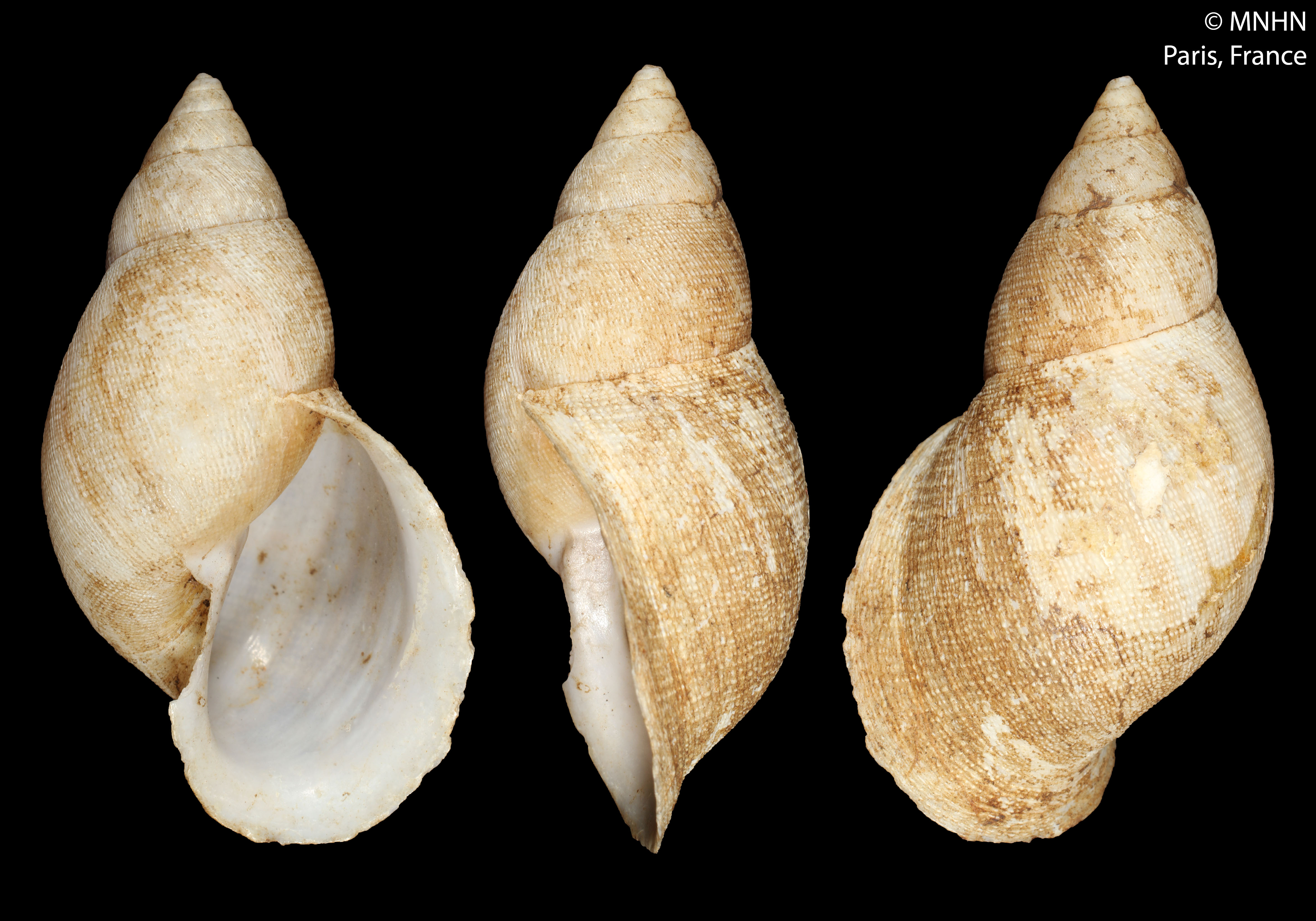
Bulimulus acholus Mabille, 1895 - lectotype at MNHN, Paris

Bulimulus is a genus of small to medium-sized tropical or sub-tropical, air-breathing land snails, pulmonate gastropod mollusks in the subfamily Bulimulinae within the family Bulimulidae.

Bulimulus is the type genus of the subfamily Bulimulinae. The shells are high and conical, and are medium-sized, ranging from about 20 to 50 mm (1 to 2 in) long.

== Species ==
Species in the genus Bulimulus include:

- Bulimulus acholus Mabille, 1895
- Bulimulus albus (G. B. Sowerby, 1839)
- Bulimulus angustus Weyrauch, 1966
- Bulimulus apodemetes (d'Orbigny, 1835)
- Bulimulus aurismalchi (O. F. Müller, 1774)
- Bulimulus bonariensis (Rafinesque, 1833)
- Bulimulus bouvieri Dautzenberg, 1897
- Bulimulus brunoi (Ihering, 1917)
- Bulimulus buenavistensis Pilsbry, 1897
- Bulimulus cacotycus Mabille, 1895
- Bulimulus cacticolus (Reeve, 1849)
- Bulimulus carmen Pilsbry & H.N. Lowe, 1932
- Bulimulus castelneaui (L. Pfeiffer, 1857)
- Bulimulus catlowae (Pfeiffer, 1847)
- Bulimulus coriaceus (L. Pfeiffer, 1856)
- Bulimulus corderoi (Parodiz, 1962)
- Bulimulus corneus (G. B. Sowerby I, 1833)
- Bulimulus corumbaensis (Pilsbry, 1857)
- Bulimulus cuernavacensis Crosse & P. Fischer, 1874 (uncertain species)
  - Bulimulus dealbatus var. jonesi Clench, 1937
  - Bulimulus dealbatus neomexicanus Pilsbry, 1946
  - Bulimulus dealbatus ozarkensis Pilsbry & Ferris, 1906
  - Bulimulus dealbatus ragsdalei (Pilsbry, 1890)
- Bulimulus diaphanus
  - Bulimulus diaphanus fraterculus (Potiez & Michaud, 1835)
- Bulimulus dismenicus Mabille, 1895
- Bulimulus dukenfieldi Melvill, 1900
- Bulimulus dysoni (L. Pfeiffer, 1846)
- Bulimulus eganus (L. Pfeiffer, 1853)
- Bulimulus elatior Hylton Scott, 1952
- Bulimulus erectus (Reeve, 1849)
- †Bulimulus fazendicus Maury, 1935 - Paleocene fossil
- Bulimulus felipponei Marshall, 1930
- Bulimulus fourmiersi (d'Orbigny, 1835)
- Bulimulus fraterculus (A. Férussac, 1821)
- †Bulimulus frenguellii (Cabrera et al., 2021)
- Bulimulus fuscus Guilding, 1828
- Bulimulus gittenbergeri Breure, 1974
- Bulimulus glandiniformis G. B. Sowerby III, 1892
- Bulimulus gorritiensis Pilsbry, 1897
- Bulimulus gracilis Hylton Scott, 1948
- Bulimulus guadalupensis (Bruguière, 1789)
  - Bulimulus guadalupensis shadowei (Herrera, 2020)
- Bulimulus hamiltoni (Reeve, 1849)
- Bulimulus haplochrous (L. Pfeiffer, 1855)
- Bulimulus hummelincki (Breure, 1974)
- Bulimulus inermis (Morelet, 1851)
- Bulimulus inutilis (Reeve, 1850)
- Bulimulus irregularis (Pfeiffer, 1847)
- Bulimulus juvenilis (L. Pfeiffer, 1855)
- †Bulimulus klappenbachi (Parodiz, 1969)
- Bulimulus krebsianus Pilsbry, 1897
- Bulimulus lehmanni (L. Pfeiffer, 1865)
- Bulimulus lherminieri (P. Fischer, 1857)
- Bulimulus limnoides (Férussac, 1832)
- Bulimulus marcidus (L. Pfeiffer, 1853)
- Bulimulus mollicellus (Reeve, 1849)
- Bulimulus mooreanus L. Pfeiffer, 1868
- Bulimulus nigromontanus Dall, 1897
- Bulimulus ouallensis Breure & Hovestadt, 2016
- Bulimulus ovulum (Reeve, 1844)
- Bulimulus pasonis Pilsbry, 1902
- Bulimulus pervius (L. Pfeiffer, 1853)
- Bulimulus pliculatus (L. Pfeiffer, 1857)
- Bulimulus pliculosus (Ancey, 1901) (taxon inquirendum)
- Bulimulus prosopidis Holmberg, 1912
- Bulimulus pubescens (Moricand, 1836)
- Bulimulus quitensis (Pfeiffer, 1847)
- Bulimulus prosopidis Holmberg, 1912
- Bulimulus recognitus Mabille, 1895
- Bulimulus regina (T.E. Bowdich ex A.E.J. Férussac, 1822)
- Bulimulus rushii (Pilsbry, 1896)
- Bulimulus sanmarcosensis Pilsbry & H.N. Lowe, 1932
- Bulimulus sarcodes (L. Pfeiffer, 1846)
- Bulimulus schadei Schlesch, 1935
- Bulimulus schiedeanus (Pfeiffer, 1841)
  - Bulimulus schiedeanus pecosensis Pilsbry & Ferris 1906
- Bulimulus sepulchralis Poey, 1852
- Bulimulus slevini Hanna, 1923
- Bulimulus subspirifer Mabille, 1895
- Bulimulus sula Simone & Amaral, 2018
- Bulimulus tenuissimus (Orbigny, 1835)
- Bulimulus transparens (Reeve, 1849)
- †Bulimulus trindadeae Ferreira & Coelho, 1971 - Paleocene fossil
- Bulimulus turritellatus Beck, 1837
- Bulimulus turritus (Broderip, 1832)
- Bulimulus unicolor (G. B. Sowerby I, 1833)
- Bulimulus uniplicatus (Férussac, 1827)
- Bulimulus versicolor (Jan, 1832)
- Bulimulus vesicalis (L. Pfeiffer, 1853)
  - Bulimulus vesicalis uruguayanus (Pilsbry, 1897)
- Bulimulus wiebesi Breure, 1974

Undescribed species

- Bulimulus sp. nov. 'josevillani'
- Bulimulus sp. nov. 'krameri'
- Bulimulus sp. nov. 'nilsodhneri'
- Bulimulus sp. nov. 'tuideroyi'
- Bulimulus sp. nov. 'vanmoli'

Synonyms

- Bulimulus dealbatus (Say, 1821): synonym of Rabdotus dealbatus (Say, 1821)
- Bulimulus inconspicuus Haas, 1949: synonym of Drymaeus inconspicuus (Haas, 1949) (original combination)
- Bulimulus pilsbryi Ferris 1925: synonym of Rabdotus pilsbryi (Ferriss, 1925)
- Bulimulus sporadicus (Orbigny, 1835): synonym of Bulimulus bonariensis (Rafinesque, 1833)
- Bulimulus trindadensis Breure & Coelho, 1976 synonym of Vegrandinia trindadensis (Breure & Coelho, 1976) within Subulinidae.
