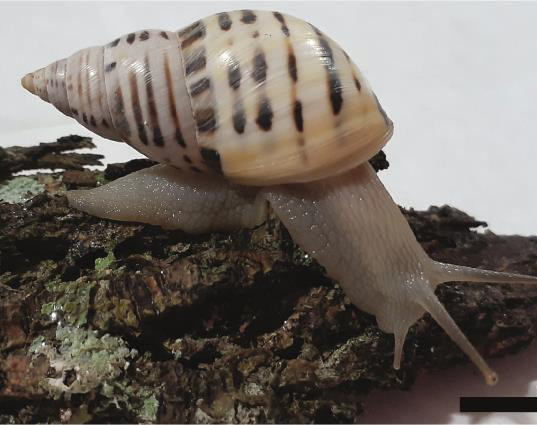
- Specimen of Drymaeus poecilus crawling over a piece of tree bark at El Impenetrable National Park of Chaco Province, Argentina

Scientific classification
- Kingdom: Animalia
- Phylum: Mollusca
- Class: Gastropoda
- Order: Stylommatophora
- Suborder: Helicina
- Superfamily: Orthalicoidea
- Family: Bulimulidae; Tryon, 1867

Genera
- See text

Diversity
- 1243 species (including Simpulopsidae and Bothriembryon).

= Bulimulidae =

Family of gastropods

Bulimulidae is a taxonomic family of medium-sized to large, air-breathing, tropical and sub-tropical land snails, terrestrial pulmonate gastropod molluscs in the superfamily Orthalicoidea.

== Distribution ==
Distribution of species in the family Bulimulidae includes Ecuador (9 genera) and other South American countries. Some species also occur in North America.

== Fossil record ==
The family's oldest fossil record dates from the late Cretaceous of Brazil (Itaboraí Basin).

== Anatomy ==
Members of this family have a haploid chromosome number between 26 and 30 (according to the values in this table).

Shells of species within Bostrycinae have a smooth protoconch and the genital organs feature a relatively long penis sheath (ca. 1/4–1/6 total phallus length).

== Taxonomy ==
Previously, the members of the Orthalicidae were also included in this family, as the subfamily Orthalicinae, and the taxa listed here were placed in their own subfamily, the Bulimulinae.

=== 2005 taxonomy ===
Bulimulinae was placed in the family Orthalicidae according to the taxonomy of the Gastropoda (Bouchet & Rocroi, 2005).

The subfamily Bulimulinae included 3 tribes:

- Tribe Bulimulini Tryon, 1867 – synonyms: Bulimidae Guilding, 1828 (inv.); Berendtiinae P. Fischer & Crosse, 1872; Bothiembryontidae Iredale, 1937
- Tribe Odontostomini Pilsbry & Vanatta, 1898 – synonym: Tomogeridae Jousseaume, 1877
- Tribe Simpulopsini Schileyko, 1999

=== 2010 taxonomy ===
Breure et al. (2010) moved Bothriembryon to Placostylidae (since 2012 as Bothriembryontidae), elevated Bulimulinae to Bulimulidae and Odontostomini to Odontostomidae.

=== 2012 taxonomy ===
Breure & Romero (2012) confirmed previous results from 2010, additionally they elevated Simpulopsini to Simpulopsidae. There are three subfamilies within Bulimulidae:

- subfamily Bulimulinae Tryon, 1867
- subfamily Peltellinae Gray, 1855
- subfamily Bostrycinae Breure, 2012

== Genera ==
Genera in the family Bulimulidae include:

subfamily Bulimulinae Tryon, 1887
(synonym: Berendtiinae P. Fischer & Crosse, 1872)

- Anctus E. von Martens, 1860
- Auris Spix, 1827
- Berendtia Crosse & P. Fischer, 1869
- Bocourtia Rochebrune, 1882
- Bulimulus Leach, 1814 – type genus of the subfamily Bulimulinae
- Cochlorina Jan, 1830
- Graptostracus Pilsbry, 1939
- Kora Simone, 2012
- Lopesianus Weyrauch, 1958
- Naesiotus Albers, 1850
- Neopetraeus E. von Martens, 1885
- Newboldius Pilsbry, 1932
- Otostomus H. Beck, 1837
- Oxychona Mörch, 1852
- Protoglyptus Pilsbry, 1897
- Pseudoxychona Pilsbry, 1930
- Rabdotus Albers, 1850
- Sanniostracus Salvador, F. S. Silva & Cavallari, 2023
- Scutalus Albers, 1850
- Spartocentrum Dall, 1895
- Sphaeroconcha Breure, 1978
- Stenostylus Pilsbry, 1898
- Suniellus Breure, 1978

subfamily Peltellinae

- Antidrymaeus Germain, 1907
- Drymaeus Albers, 1850
- Peltella Gray, 1855 – type genus of the subfamily Peltellinae
- Mesembrinus Albers, 1850

subfamily Bostrycinae

- Bostryx Troschel, 1847 sensu lato- type genus of the subfamily Bostrycinae

Unassigned within Bulimulidae

- Bulimus Bruguière, 1789 (temporary name)
- †Itaborahia Maury, 1935
- † Oreoconus D. W. Taylor in McKenna et al., 1962
- † Palaeobulimulus Parodiz, 1949
- Stapafurdius Simone, 2021
- † Tocobaga Auffenberg, Slapcinsky & Portell, 2015

== Synonyms ==
- Adzharia P. Hesse, 1933: synonym of Bulimulus Leach, 1814 (junior synonym)
- Antidrymaeus Germain, 1907: synonym of Drymaeus (Mesembrinus) Albers, 1850 represented as Drymaeus Albers, 1850
- Atahualpa Strebel, 1910: synonym of Thaumastus E. von Martens, 1860
- Ataxellus Dall, 1912: synonym of Bostryx (Geopyrgus) Pilsbry, 1896 represented asBostryx Troschel, 1847
- Ataxus Albers, 1850: synonym of Bostryx Troschel, 1847
- Bilamelliferus Weyrauch, 1958: synonym of Bostryx Troschel, 1847 (junior synonymy)
- Cochlogena Férussac, 1821: synonym of Bulimulus Leach, 1814 (junior synonym)
- Diaphanomormus Weyrauch, 1964: synonym of Drymaeus (Mesembrinus) Albers, 1850 represented as Drymaeus Albers, 1850
- Elatibostryx Weyrauch, 1958: synonym of Bostryx Troschel, 1847
- Floreziellus Weyrauch, 1967: synonym of Bostryx Troschel, 1847 (junior synonymy)
- Geoceras Pilsbry, 1896: synonym of Bostryx (Geopyrgus) Pilsbry, 1896 represented as Bostryx Troschel, 1847
- Globulinus Crosse & P. Fischer, 1875: synonym of Rabdotus Albers, 1850
- Goniognathmus Crosse & P. Fischer, 1875: synonym of Drymaeus Albers, 1850 (junior synonym)
- Hamadryas Albers, 1850: synonym of Drymaeus Albers, 1850
- Hannarabdotus Emerson & Jacobson, 1964: synonym of Rabdotus Albers, 1850
- Kionoptyx Haas, 1966: synonym of Bostryx Troschel, 1847 (junior synonymy)
- Kuschelenia Hylton Scott, 1951: synonym of Bocourtia (Kuschelenia) Hylton Scott, 1951 represented as Bocourtia Rochebrune, 1882
- Leptodrymaeus Pilsbry, 1946: synonym of Drymaeus (Mesembrinus) Albers, 1850 represented as Drymaeus Albers, 1850
- Leptomerus Albers, 1850: synonym of Bulimulus Leach, 1814
- Leptomormus Weyrauch, 1958: synonym of Drymaeus (Mesembrinus) Albers, 1850 represented as Drymaeus Albers, 1850
- Liostracus [sic]: synonym of Leiostracus Albers, 1850 (misspelling of original genus, Leiostracus Albers, 1850)
- Loboa Ihering, 1917: synonym of Bulimulus Leach, 1814
- Mormus E. von Martens, 1860: synonym of Drymaeus Albers, 1850
- Multifasciatus Weyrauch, 1958: synonym of Bostryx (Geopyrgus) Pilsbry, 1896 represented as Bostryx Troschel, 1847
- Naesiotellus Weyrauch, 1967: synonym of Bostryx Troschel, 1847 (junior synonym)
- Navicula Spix, 1827: synonym of Cochlorina Jan, 1830
- Nesiotes E. von Martens, 1860: synonym of Naesiotus Albers, 1850
- Obstrussus Parodiz, 1946: synonym of Naesiotus Albers, 1850
- Olinodia Dall, 1920: synonym of Naesiotus (Reclasta) Dall, 1920 represented as Naesiotus Albers, 1850
- Orphaicus Schaufuss, 1869: synonym of Thaumastus E. von Martens, 1860
- Orphnus Albers, 1850: synonym of Thaumastus E. von Martens, 1860
- Orthotomium Crosse & P. Fischer, 1875: synonym of Rabdotus Albers, 1850
- Pachyotus H. Beck, 1837: synonym of Auris Spix, 1827
- Pachytholus Strebel, 1909: synonym of Thaumastus E. von Martens, 1860
- Pampasinus Weyrauch, 1958: synonym of Bostryx (Platybostryx) Pilsbry, 1896: synonym ofBostryx Troschel, 1847
- Peronaeus Albers, 1850: synonym of Bostryx Troschel, 1847
- Phenacotaxus Dall, 1912: synonym of Bostryx (Geopyrgus) Pilsbry, 1896 represented as Bostryx Troschel, 1847
- Plecochilus Agassiz, 1846: synonym of Plekocheilus Guilding, 1827 (unjustified emendation)
- Pseudoperonaeus Weyrauch, 1958: synonym of Bostryx (Geopyrgus) Pilsbry, 1896 represented as Bostryx Troschel, 1847
- Pseudorhodea Dall, 1895: synonym of Rabdotus (Plicolumna) J.G. Cooper, 1895 represented as Rabdotus Albers, 1850
- Pyrgus Albers, 1850: synonym of Bostryx (Geopyrgus) Pilsbry, 1896 represented as Bostryx Troschel, 1847
- Rhabdotus [sic]: synonym of Rabdotus Albers, 1850 (incorrect subsequent spelling)
- Rhaphiellus L. Pfeiffer, 1856: synonym of Naesiotus Albers, 1850
- Rimatula Parodiz, 1946: synonym of Protoglyptus Pilsbry, 1897
- Saeronia Dall, 1920: synonym of Naesiotus Albers, 1850
- Semiclausaria L. Pfeiffer, 1856: synonym of Drymaeus Albers, 1850 (junior synonym)
- Siphalomphix Rafinesque, 1833: synonym of Bulimulus Leach, 1814
- Sonorina Pilsbry, 1896: synonym of Rabdotus (Leptobyrsus) Crosse & P. Fischer, 1875 represented as Rabdotus Albers, 1850
- Spiroscutalus Pilsbry, 1932: synonym of Scutalus Albers, 1850
- Stenostoma Spix, 1827: synonym of Anctus E. von Martens, 1860
- Tatutor Jousseaume, 1887: synonym of Thaumastus E. von Martens, 1860
- Teneritia J. Mabille, 1898: synonym of Spartocentrum Dall, 1895
- Tholus Strebel, 1909: synonym of Thaumastus E. von Martens, 1860
- Xenothauma Fulton 1896: synonym of Scutalus Albers, 1850
- Zaplagius Pilsbry, 1896: synonym of Cochlorina Jan, 1830
