= List of Drymaeus species =

There are ca. 300 species within the Neotropical land snail genus Drymaeus. The precise number is subject to change due to ongoing taxonomic revisions.

== List of species ==
- Drymaeus abruptus (Rolle, 1904)
- Drymaeus abyssorum (A. d'Orbigny, 1835)
- Drymaeus acervatus (L. Pfeiffer, 1857)
- Drymaeus acuminatus S. I. Da Costa, 1906
- Drymaeus aequatorianus (E. A. Smith, 1877)
- Drymaeus albolabiatus (E. A. Smith, 1877)
- Drymaeus alternans (H. Beck, 1837)
- Drymaeus ambustus (Reeve, 1849)
- Drymaeus angustus S. I. Da Costa, 1906
- Drymaeus araujoi Vega-Luz, Breure & Mogollón, 2024
- Drymaeus arcuatostriatus (L. Pfeiffer, 1855)
- Drymaeus auris (L. Pfeiffer, 1866)
- Drymaeus aurisratti (R. A. Philippi, 1867)
- Drymaeus baezensis (Hidalgo, 1869)
- Drymaeus baranguillanus (L. Pfeiffer, 1853)
- Drymaeus bartletti (H. Adams, 1867)
- Drymaeus basitorus F. Haas, 1951
- Drymaeus beyerleanus (Hupé, 1857)
- Drymaeus bivittatus (G. B. Sowerby I, 1833)
- Drymaeus bogotensis (L. Pfeiffer, 1855)
- Drymaeus bolivarii (A. d'Orbigny, 1835)
- Drymaeus bolivianus (L. Pfeiffer, 1846)
- Drymaeus bourcieri (L. Pfeiffer, 1853)
- Drymaeus brachysoma (A. d'Orbigny, 1835)
- Drymaeus branneri F. Baker, 1914
- Drymaeus bucia (L. Pfeiffer, 1859)
- Drymaeus buckleyi (G. B. Sowerby III, 1895)
- Drymaeus canaliculatus (L. Pfeiffer, 1845)
- Drymaeus cantatus (Reeve, 1848)
- Drymaeus castaneostrigatus S. I. Da Costa, 1906
- Drymaeus castilhensis Simone & Amaral, 2018
- Drymaeus castus (L. Pfeiffer, 1847)
- Drymaeus catenae F. Haas, 1952
- Drymaeus caucaensis (S. I. Da Costa, 1898)
- Drymaeus chanchamayensis (Hidalgo, 1870)
- Drymaeus chiapasensis (L. Pfeiffer, 1866)
- Drymaeus chimborasensis (Reeve, 1848)
- Drymaeus coarctatus (L. Pfeiffer, 1845)
- Drymaeus cognatus Pilsbry, 1901
- Drymaeus colimensis (Rolle, 1895)
- Drymaeus combinai (Weyrauch, 1958)
- Drymaeus confluens (L. Pfeiffer, 1855)
- Drymaeus conicus S. I. Da Costa, 1907
- Drymaeus convexus (L. Pfeiffer, 1855)
- Drymaeus costatus Breure & Vega-Luz, 2021
- Drymaeus currais Simone, Belz & Gernet, 2020
- Drymaeus dacostae (G. B. Sowerby III, 1892)
- Drymaeus dakryodes Salvador, Cavallari & Simone, 2015
- Drymaeus decoratus (I. Lea, 1838)
- Drymaeus denticulus Breure & Borrero, 2019
- Drymaeus dombeyanus (L. Pfeiffer, 1842)
- Drymaeus dunkeri (L. Pfeiffer, 1846)
- Drymaeus duplexannulus Breure & Borrero, 2019
- Drymaeus edmuelleri (Albers, 1854)
- Drymaeus elsteri S. I. Da Costa, 1901
- Drymaeus eurystomus (R. A. Philippi, 1867)
- Drymaeus exoticus S. I. Da Costa, 1901
- Drymaeus expansus (L. Pfeiffer, 1848)
- Drymaeus expatriatus (Preston, 1909)
- Drymaeus extraneus (F. Haas, 1955)
- Drymaeus fabrefactus (Reeve, 1848)
- Drymaeus fallax (L. Pfeiffer, 1853)
- Drymaeus felix (L. Pfeiffer, 1862)
- Drymaeus fenestratus (L. Pfeiffer, 1846)
- Drymaeus feriatus (Reeve, 1848)
- Drymaeus flexilabris (L. Pfeiffer, 1854)
- Drymaeus flexuosus (L. Pfeiffer, 1853)
- Drymaeus flossdorfi (Holmberg, 1909)
- Drymaeus fordii Pilsbry, 1898
- Drymaeus fucatus (Reeve, 1848)
- Drymaeus fusoides (A. d'Orbigny, 1835)
- Drymaeus geometricus (L. Pfeiffer, 1846)
- Drymaeus germaini (Ancey, 1892)
- Drymaeus gibber F. Haas, 1949
- Drymaeus glaucostomus (Albers, 1852)
- Drymaeus goianensis Dutra-Clarke & F. B. Souza, 1991
- Drymaeus gueinzii (L. Pfeiffer, 1857)
- Drymaeus henrypilsbry (Weyrauch, 1958)
- Drymaeus henselii (E. von Martens, 1868)
- Drymaeus hidalgoi (S. I. DaCosta, 1898)
- Drymaeus hygrohylaeus (A. d'Orbigny, 1835)
- Drymaeus hyltoni Parodiz, 1957
- Drymaeus icterostomus (E. von Martens, 1901)
- Drymaeus iheringi (Leme, 1968)
- Drymaeus inaequalis (L. Pfeiffer, 1857)
- Drymaeus inca M. Smith, 1943
- Drymaeus inclinatus (L. Pfeiffer, 1862)
- Drymaeus iniurius Breure & Borrero, 2019
- Drymaeus intermissus Breure & Borrero, 2019
- Drymaeus interpictus (E. von Martens, 1867)
- Drymaeus josephus (Angas, 1878)
- Drymaeus jousseaumei Dautzenberg, 1901
- Drymaeus lattrei (L. Pfeiffer, 1846)
- Drymaeus laxostylus (Rolle, 1904)
- Drymaeus leai Pilsbry, 1898
- Drymaeus lilacinus (Reeve, 1849)
- Drymaeus limicolarioides F. Haas, 1936
- Drymaeus linostoma (A. d'Orbigny, 1835)
- Drymaeus lophoicus (A. d'Orbigny, 1835)
- Drymaeus luculentus Breure & Vega-Luz, 2021
- Drymaeus magus (J. A. Wagner, 1827)
- Drymaeus malleatus (S. I. Da Costa, 1898)
- Drymaeus marcapatensis Breure, 1979
- Drymaeus marmarinus (A. d'Orbigny, 1835)
- Drymaeus meesi Breure, 1976
- Drymaeus megas Pilsbry, 1944
- Drymaeus megastomus J. J. Parodiz, 1963
- Drymaeus membielinus (Crosse, 1867)
- Drymaeus micropyrus Simone & Amaral, 2018
- Drymaeus muelleggeri Jaeckel, 1927
- Drymaeus multiguttatus Weyrauch, 1964
- Drymaeus murrinus (Reeve, 1848)
- Drymaeus narcissus (Albers, 1854)
- Drymaeus nebulosus Breure & Ablett, 2024
- Drymaeus nigroflavus Simone & Celzard, 2024
- Drymaeus nigrogularis (Dohrn, 1882)
- Drymaeus notabilis S. I. Da Costa, 1906
- Drymaeus notatus S. I. Da Costa, 1906
- Drymaeus nystianus (L. Pfeiffer, 1853)
- Drymaeus ochrocheilus (E. A. Smith, 1877)
- Drymaeus ommatidia Dorado & Roosen, 2024
- Drymaeus orthostoma (E. A. Smith, 1877)
- Drymaeus palassus Breure & Eskens, 1981
- Drymaeus palliolum (A. Férussac, 1821)
- Drymaeus pamplonensis Pilsbry, 1939
- Drymaeus papyraceus (Mawe, 1823)
- Drymaeus papyrifactus Pilsbry, 1898
- Drymaeus paucipunctus Pilsbry, 1898
- Drymaeus pealianus (I. Lea, 1838)
- Drymaeus peelii (Reeve, 1859)
- Drymaeus petasites (K. Miller, 1878)
- Drymaeus planibasis Pilsbry, 1932
- Drymaeus poecilus (A. d'Orbigny, 1835)
- Drymaeus polygramma (S. Moricand, 1836)
- Drymaeus protractus (L. Pfeiffer, 1855)
- Drymaeus pseudofusoides S. I. Da Costa, 1906
- Drymaeus punctatus S. I. Da Costa, 1907
- Drymaeus quadrifasciatus (Angas, 1878)
- Drymaeus rabuti (Jousseaume, 1898)
- Drymaeus rectilinearis (L. Pfeiffer, 1855)
- Drymaeus regularis Fulton, 1905
- Drymaeus rhoadsi Pilsbry, 1932
- Drymaeus ribeiroi Ihering, 1915
- Drymaeus rosenbergi S. I. Da Costa, 1906
- Drymaeus rugistriatus F. Haas, 1952
- Drymaeus sanctaemarthae Pilsbry, 1901
- Drymaeus schadei Quintana & Magaldi, 1985
- Drymaeus schmidti (L. Pfeiffer, 1854)
- Drymaeus schunkei F. Haas, 1949
- Drymaeus scoliodes Dautzenberg, 1902
- Drymaeus selli (Preston, 1909)
- Drymaeus semistriatus F. Haas, 1955
- Drymaeus sentatus Oliveira, Silveira e Sà & Bessa, 1992
- Drymaeus serperastrum (Say, 1829)
- Drymaeus serratus (L. Pfeiffer, 1855)
- Drymaeus signifer (L. Pfeiffer, 1855)
- Drymaeus similaris (J. Moricand, 1856)
- Drymaeus siolii F. Haas, 1952
- Drymaeus smithii (S. I. Da Costa, 1898)
- Drymaeus solidus (Preston, 1907)
- Drymaeus sophiae Breure, 1979
- Drymaeus souzalopesi Weyrauch, 1965
- Drymaeus spadiceus S. I. Da Costa, 1906
- Drymaeus spectatus (Reeve, 1849)
- Drymaeus strigatus (G. B. Sowerby I, 1833)
- Drymaeus studeri (L. Pfeiffer, 1847)
- Drymaeus subeffusus (R. A. Philippi, 1869)
- Drymaeus subinterruptus (L. Pfeiffer, 1853)
- Drymaeus subsemiclausus (Petit de la Saussaye, 1843)
- Drymaeus subsimilaris Pilsbry, 1898
- Drymaeus subventricosus S. I. Da Costa, 1901
- Drymaeus succineus Pilsbry, 1901
- Drymaeus suprapunctatus F. Baker, 1914
- Drymaeus sykesi S. I. Da Costa, 1906
- Drymaeus tigrinus (Da Costa, 1898)
- Drymaeus translucidus Weyrauch, 1967
- Drymaeus tzubi D. S. Dourson, Caldwell & J. A. Dourson, 2018
- Drymaeus valentini Breure & Vega-Luz, 2020
- Drymaeus ventricosus (Preston, 1907)
- Drymaeus verecundus Breure & Mogollón, 2019
- Drymaeus vicinus (Preston, 1907)
- Drymaeus villavicioensis Breure, 1977
- Drymaeus volsus Fulton, 1907
- Drymaeus weeksi Pilsbry, 1926
- Drymaeus yapacanensis Breure, 1981
- Drymaeus zhorquinensis (Angas, 1879)
- Drymaeus ziczac (Da Costa, 1898)
- Drymaeus zingarensis Restrepo & Breure, 1987
- Drymaeus zoographicus (A. d'Orbigny, 1835)
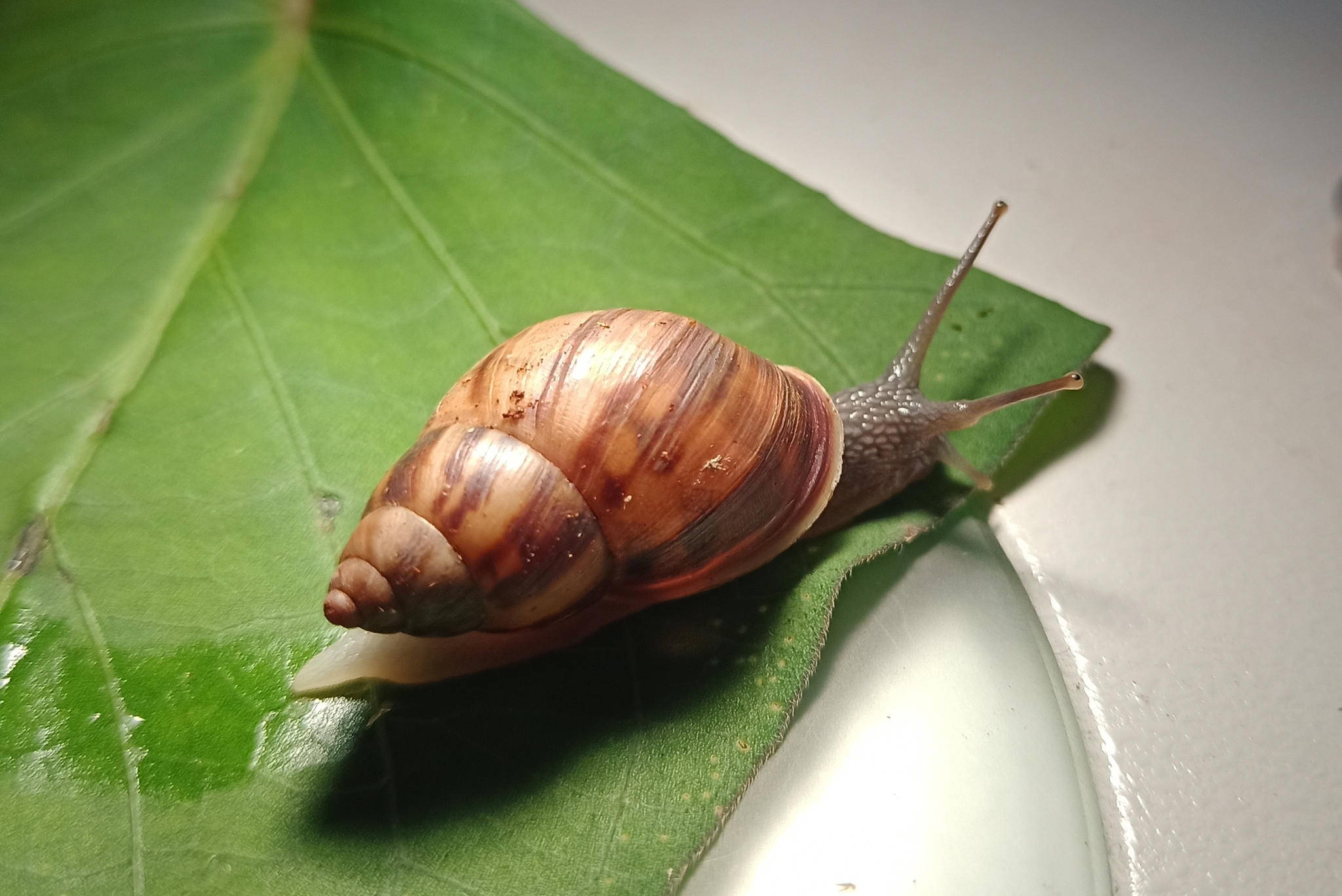
Drymaeus magus

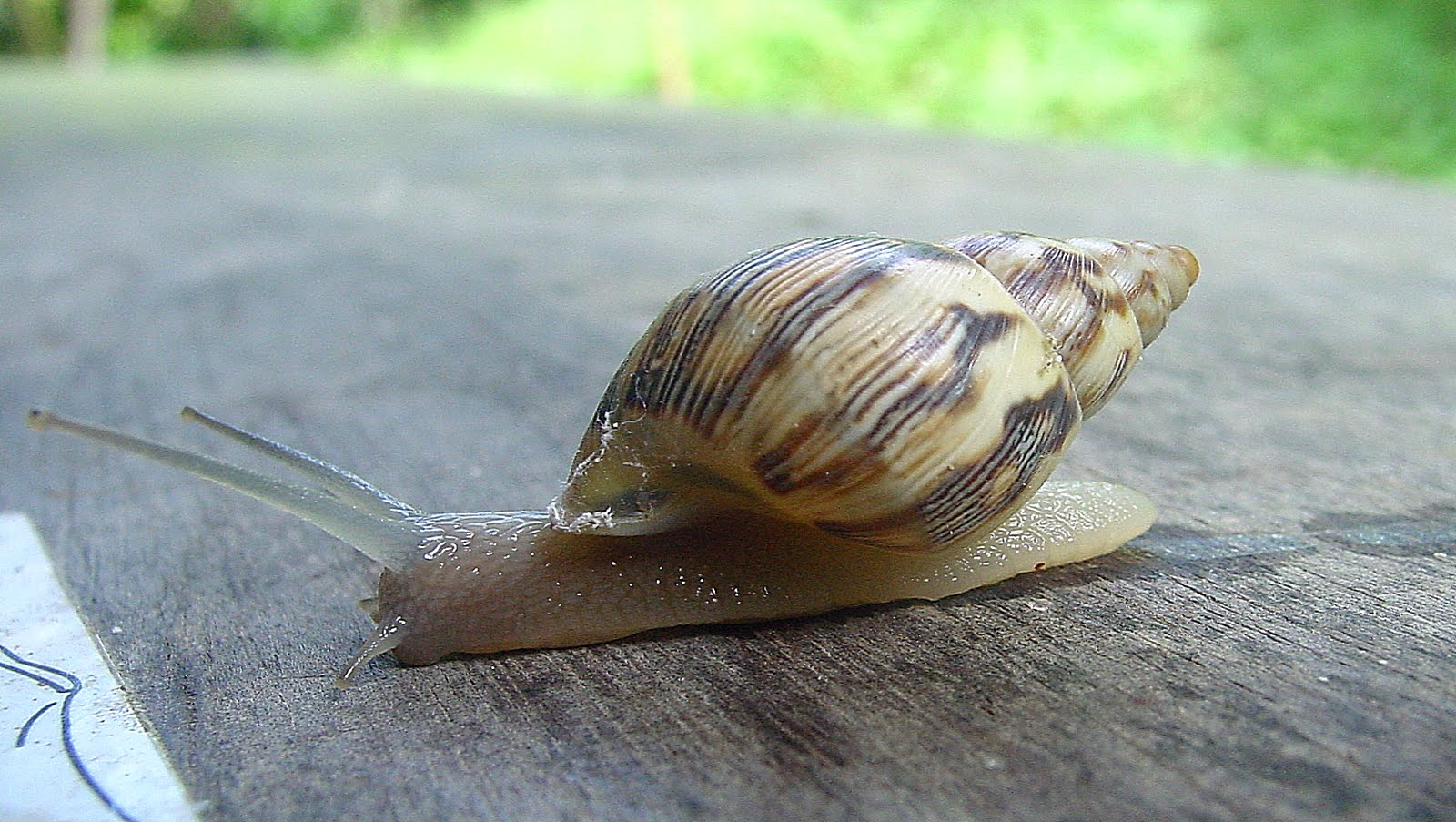
Drymaeus papyraceus

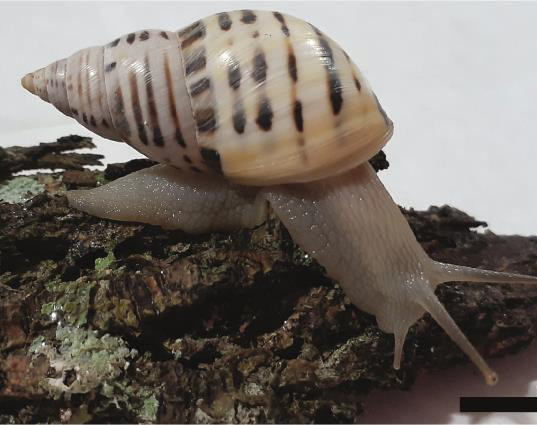
Drymaeus poecilus

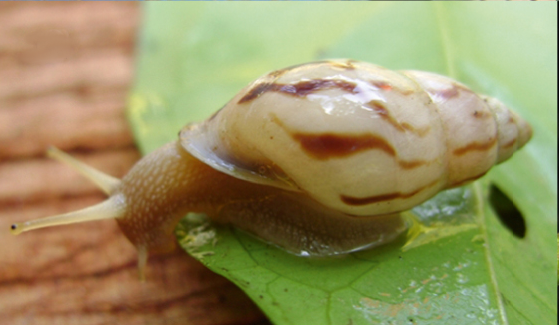
Drymaeus strigatus
