= Drymaeus castilhensis =

Scientific classification
- Kingdom: Animalia
- Phylum: Mollusca
- Class: Gastropoda
- Order: Stylommatophora
- Family: Bulimulidae
- Genus: Drymaeus
- Species: D. castilhensis

Binomial name
- Drymaeus castilhensis Simone & Amaral, 2018

Species of gastropod

Drymaeus castilhensis is a species of tropical air-breathing land snail, a pulmonate gastropod mollusc in the family Bulimulidae endemic to Brazil. It was described in 2018, with the Ilha do Castilho off southeastern Brazil as its type locality.

== Phylogeny ==
- Peltellinae
  - - Drymaeus cf. schadei
    - Drymaeus dominicus
  - - - Mesembrinus spp.
      - - Antidrymaeus spp.
        - - - Drymaeus serratus
            - - Pseudoxychona dulcis
              - - Peltella palliolum
                - Peltella iheringi
          - Drymaeus poecilus
          - - Drymaeus pamplonensis
            - Drymaeus expansus
            - Drymaeus branneri
          - - Drymaeus castilhensis
            - Drymaeus papyraceus
            - Drymaeus magus

Molecular phylogeny of Drymaeus and related genera after Rosa et al., 2025

Genetic studies using both mitochondrial and nuclear markers, specifically COI, H3, and ITS2/28S, have placed Drymaeus castilhensis in a well-supported group together with D. magus and D. papyraceus, confirming their similarities based on morphology. This clade shares a common ancestor with species from the genera Mesembrinus and Antidrymaeus. The genus Drymaeus is highly diverse, with around 300 species, so future genetic studies with more species included may lead to changes in our understanding of its evolutionary relationships or result in a revised phylogenetic tree.
