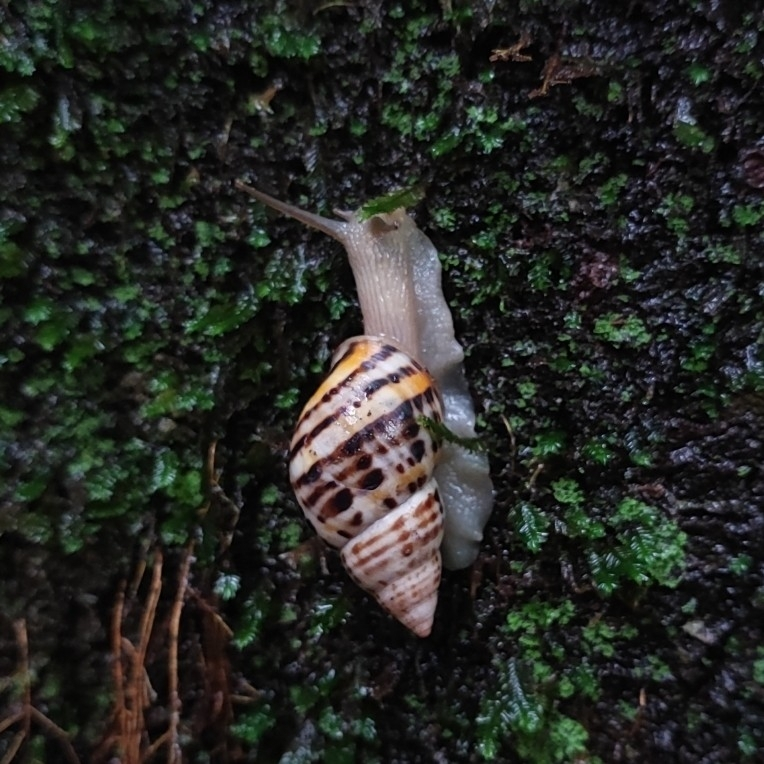
- A live specimen of Drymaeus poecilus from Brazil

Scientific classification
- Kingdom: Animalia
- Phylum: Mollusca
- Class: Gastropoda
- Order: Stylommatophora
- Family: Bulimulidae
- Genus: Drymaeus
- Species: D. poecilus

Binomial name
- Drymaeus poecilus (A. d'Orbigny, 1835)

Synonyms
- List: Bulimus pictus Bonnet, 1864; Bulimus poecilus (A. d'Orbigny, 1835); Bulimus poecilus var. ictericus Ancey, 1892; Bulimulus poecilus (A. d'Orbigny, 1835); Drymaeus (Drymaeus) poecilus (A. d'Orbigny, 1835); Drymaeus lynchi Parodiz, 1946; Drymaeus minor (A. d'Orbigny, 1837); Drymaeus poecilus tricinctus Parodiz, 1963; Helix (Bulimus) poecila (A. d'Orbigny, 1835); Helix (Bulimus) poecila var. major A. d'Orbigny, 1838; Helix (Bulimus) poecila var. minor A. d'Orbigny, 1838; Helix poecila A. d'Orbigny, 1835 (basionym)

= Drymaeus poecilus =

Species of gastropod

Drymaeus poecilus is a species of tropical land snail, a pulmonate gastropod mollusc in the family Bulimulidae that is native to parts of South America. It was first described in 1835, with the Bolivian Chiquitos Province as its type locality. The species is known to occur in several South American regions and countries beyond Bolivia including Argentina, Brazil, and Paraguay, inhabiting both dry and humid ecoregions. Drymaeus poecilus is a medium-sized land snail with a 31–37 mm glossy shell, exhibiting wide variation in color patterns such as spiral lines, bicolored bands, and axial markings. Its protoconch has a distinctive net-like sculpture, typical of the genus and related groups. There are differences in shell shape and coloration, which are currently regarded as intraspecific variations.

Phylogenetic analyses based on genetic markers place Drymaeus poecilus in a clade that also includes other species from the genera Drymaeus, Pseudoxychona, and Peltella. This group appears to be closely related to species from the genera Mesembrinus and Antidrymaeus. However, given the great diversity of the genus Drymaeus and the small number of species analyzed, these results are still considered preliminary.

Specimens of Drymaeus poecilus found at the El Pobladito de Ampolla, an archaeological site in Argentina, are considered evidence that these gastropods may have been part of a subsistence strategy by pre-Hispanic populations, including both culinary and utilitarian uses.

== Taxonomy and nomenclature ==
The species was first described in 1835 by French naturalist Alcide d'Orbigny as Helix poecila, with the Bolivian Chiquitos Province designated as its type locality. Its specific epithet, poecila, originates from the Greek word ποικίλος (poikilos), meaning "varicolored", "pied" or "mottled". In a later study published in 1837, d'Orbigny reassigned the species to the genus Bulimus, renaming it Bulimus poecilus, which remained an accepted combination in subsequent works. In 1897, French conchologist César Marie Félix Ancey recombined the species as Bulimulus poecilus and in 1898, American malacologist Henry A. Pilsbry transferred the species to the genus Drymaeus, establishing the currently accepted combination, Drymaeus poecilus.

According to MolluscaBase, the mollusk-oriented branch of WoRMS, Drymaeus poecilus includes two subspecies: Drymaeus poecilus poecilus, the nominate subspecies, and Drymaeus poecilus tricinctus. The latter has been recently listed as a junior synonym (which would in turn synonymize the nominate subspecies) by some authors, but this interpretation is yet to be incorporated by MolluscaBase.

== Description ==
=== Shell ===
Drymaeus poecilus is considered a medium-sized land snail, with a shell length ranging from 31 to 37 mm. The shell consists of up to seven whorls, featuring a cone-shaped spire with a shallow suture. The aperture is wide, slanted, and makes up about half the shell's total length. In larger individuals, the peristome, which is the outer edge of the aperture, is smooth and slightly turned outward. The glossy shell surface varies in color from white to yellowish, adorned with dark brown to reddish spiral bands and axial markings in diverse patterns. Like other members of the genus Drymaeus and closely related genera such as Antidrymaeus, Mesembrinus, and Pseudoxychona, the protoconch displays a characteristic net-like texture created by intersecting spiral and axial threads.

=== Soft parts ===
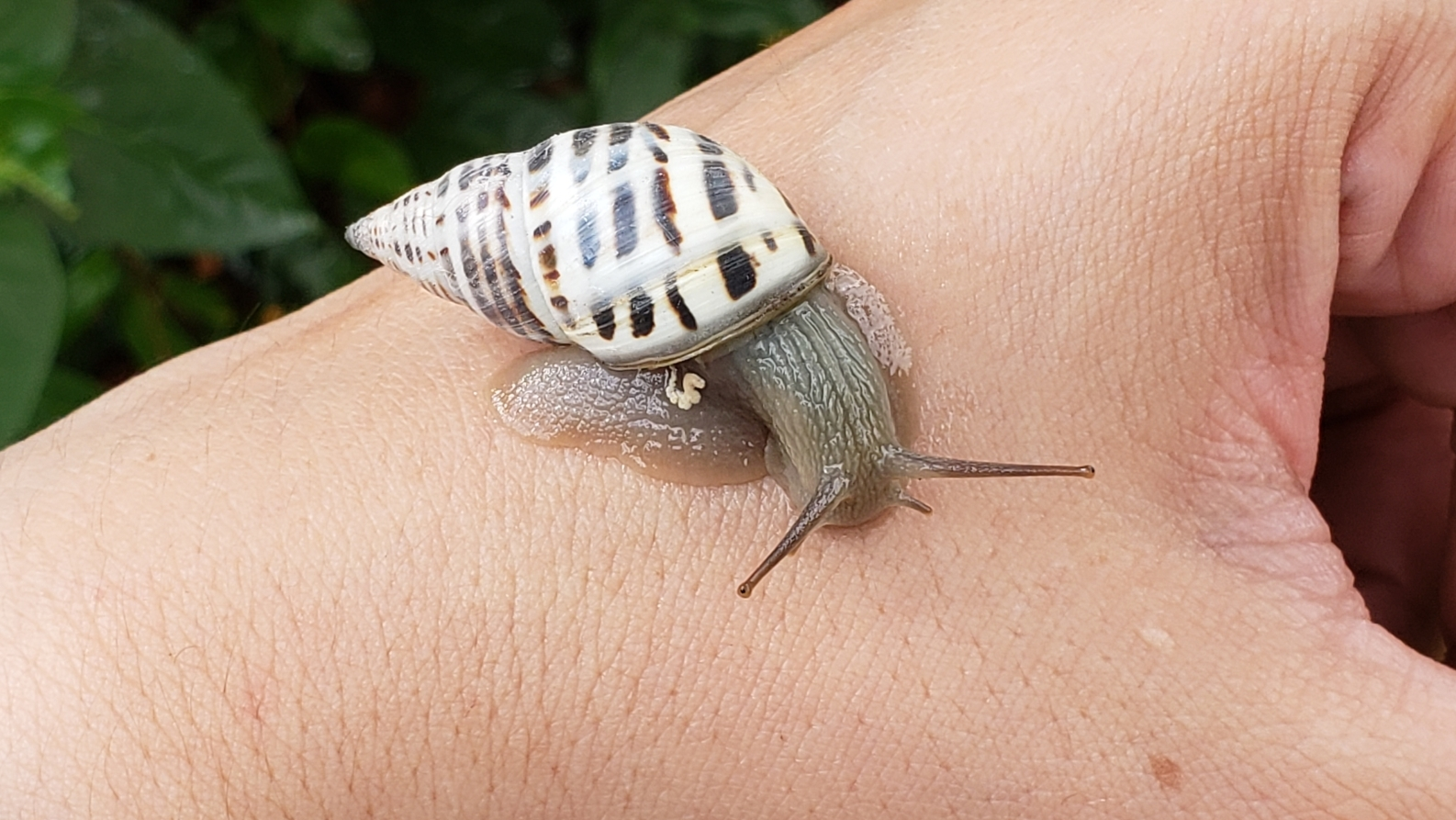
Drymaeus poecilus on a human hand for scale.

The head and foot of Drymaeus poecilus are dark beige in color, with the base of the foot and the tentacles showing a grayish tone. Like most land snails, this species is hermaphroditic, meaning it has both male and female reproductive organs that function simultaneously. Inside the body, the penis is partly enclosed by a sheath that covers about one-sixth of its total length. The organ itself is mostly cylindrical, with a wider end that gradually transitions into the epiphallus, though this change is not externally visible. Attached to the end of the epiphallus is the flagellum, a narrow, tube-like extension that is closed at one end. It is about half the width of the epiphallus and makes up roughly a quarter of the penis's total length. The vagina in this species is relatively short compared to other members of the genus. The spermathecal duct, which carries sperm to the storage organ, begins with a tapered section, then narrows into a cylindrical tube that leads to a long, roughly spherical spermatheca.

On a microscopic level, the inner lining of the proximal (closer to the body) part of the penis in Drymaeus poecilus features four small internal folds and is covered with a tall, cylindrical type of epithelial tissue. Both the epiphallus and the flagellum are lined with a ciliated cuboidal epithelium, a thin, protective cell layer made up of square-shaped cells, identifiable in cross-section under a microscope. Beneath this layer lies a region containing subepithelial glandular cells, which are responsible for secreting substances. In most Drymaeus species, the tissue beneath the epithelium of the penis includes large, rounded cells; however, these particular cells are not present at the distal (farther) end of the penis in D. poecilus.

=== Morphological and chromatic variation ===
Drymaeus poecilus is known for the ample variety of colors and patterns found on its shell. Alongside this color variation, there are also small differences in shell shape among individuals.

The shell patterns can vary widely from continuous or dotted spiral lines to two-toned bands and vertical markings. Some snails even show flame-like patterns, similar to those seen in the genus Leiostracus. There are also nearly all-white individuals that have just a single spiral band. Smaller snails might show several thin spiral lines along with a reddish area near the shell's opening, a feature that sometimes appears in more "typical"-looking specimens as well. In some cases, the space between spiral bands can also have a reddish tint.

Despite this colorful variety, all individuals share a consistent overall shell structure (apart from size) and a distinct net-like texture on the protoconch, the earliest part of the shell. Because of this, scientists view these differences as natural variation within the same species. The shape of the shell can also differ slightly, ranging from narrow to broader forms. Most of the time, the shell surface is smooth except for natural growth lines. However, one unusual specimen in the Natural History Museum, London shows dense vertical ridges. This rare feature is currently considered an unusual variation within the species.

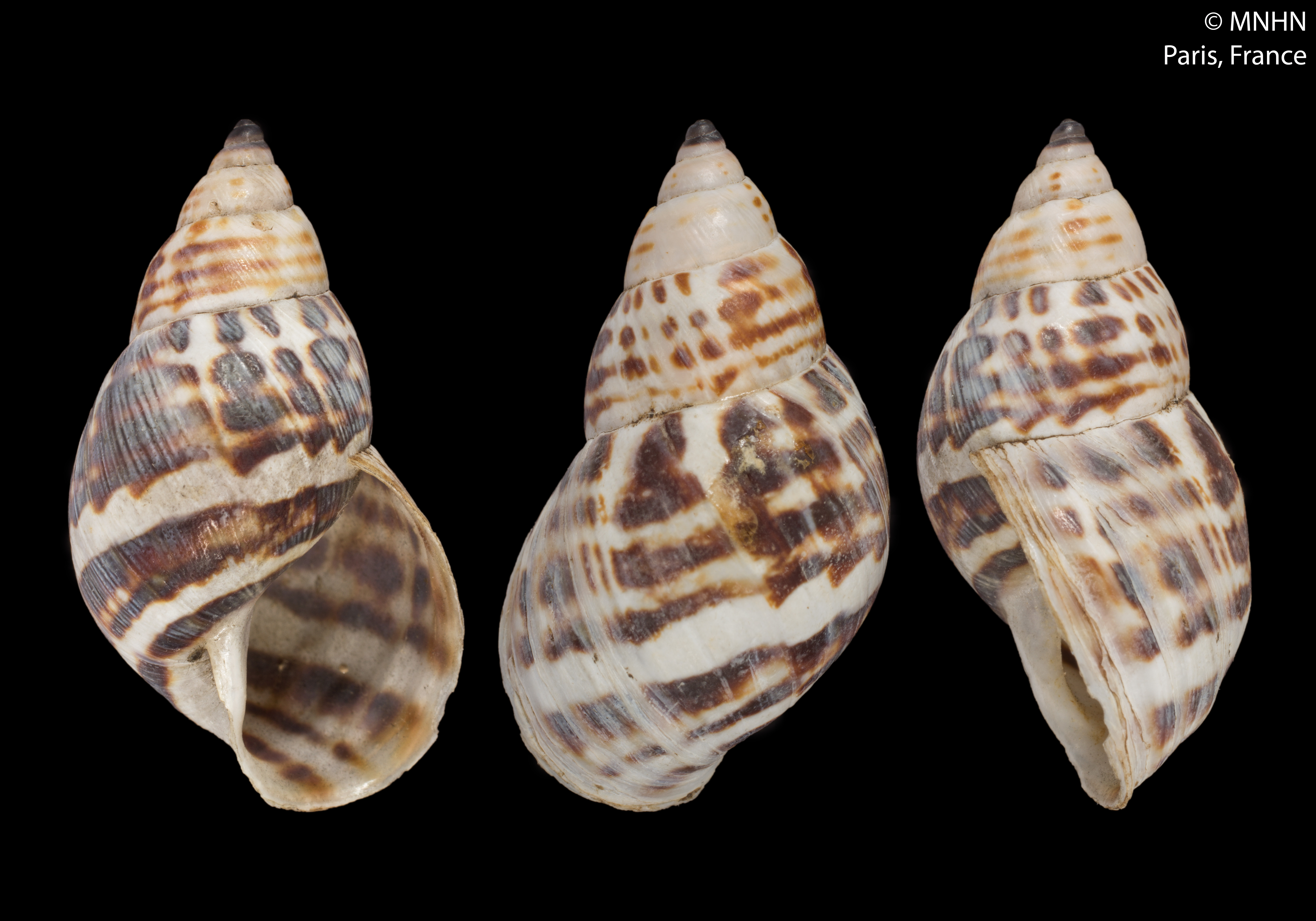
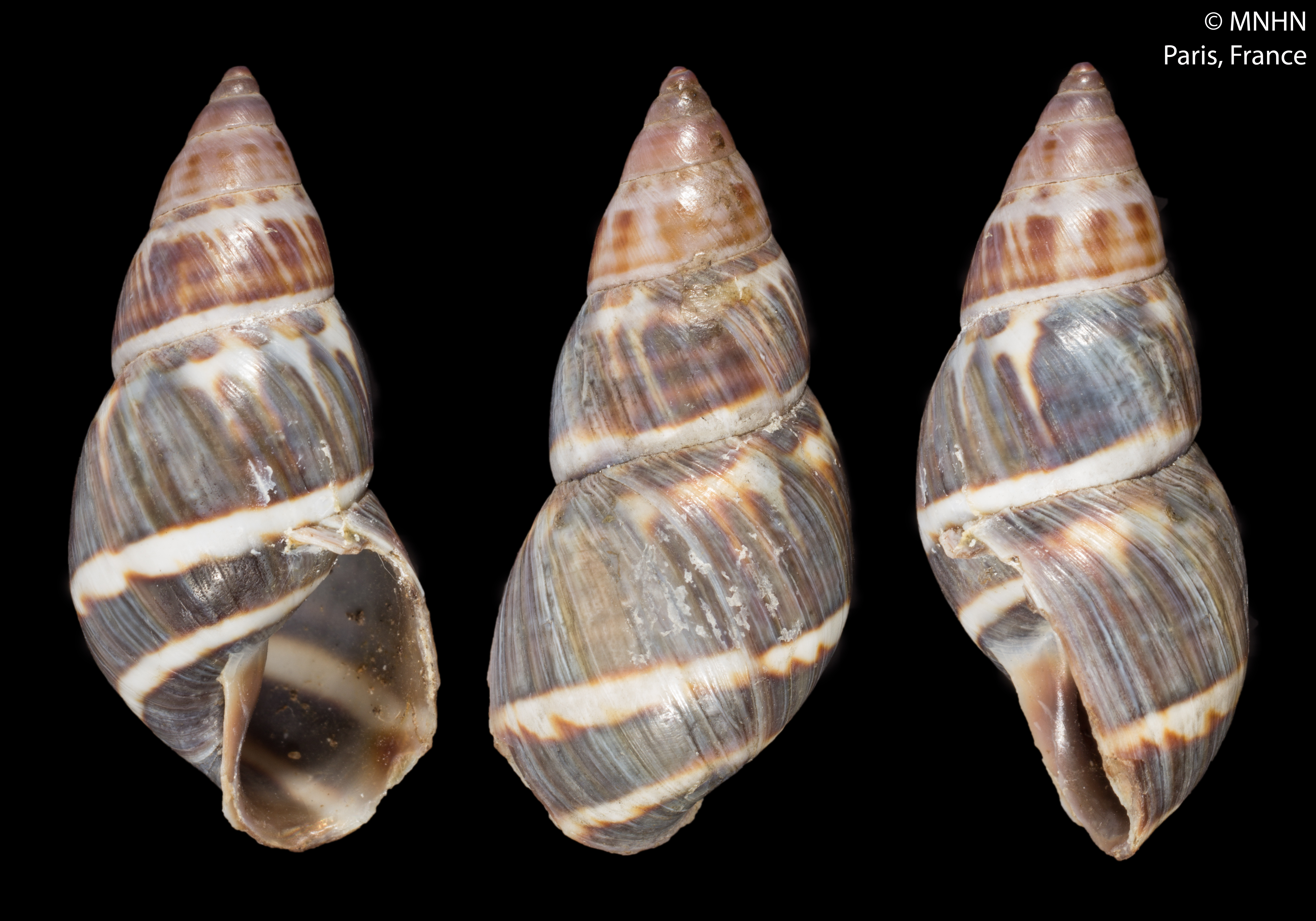
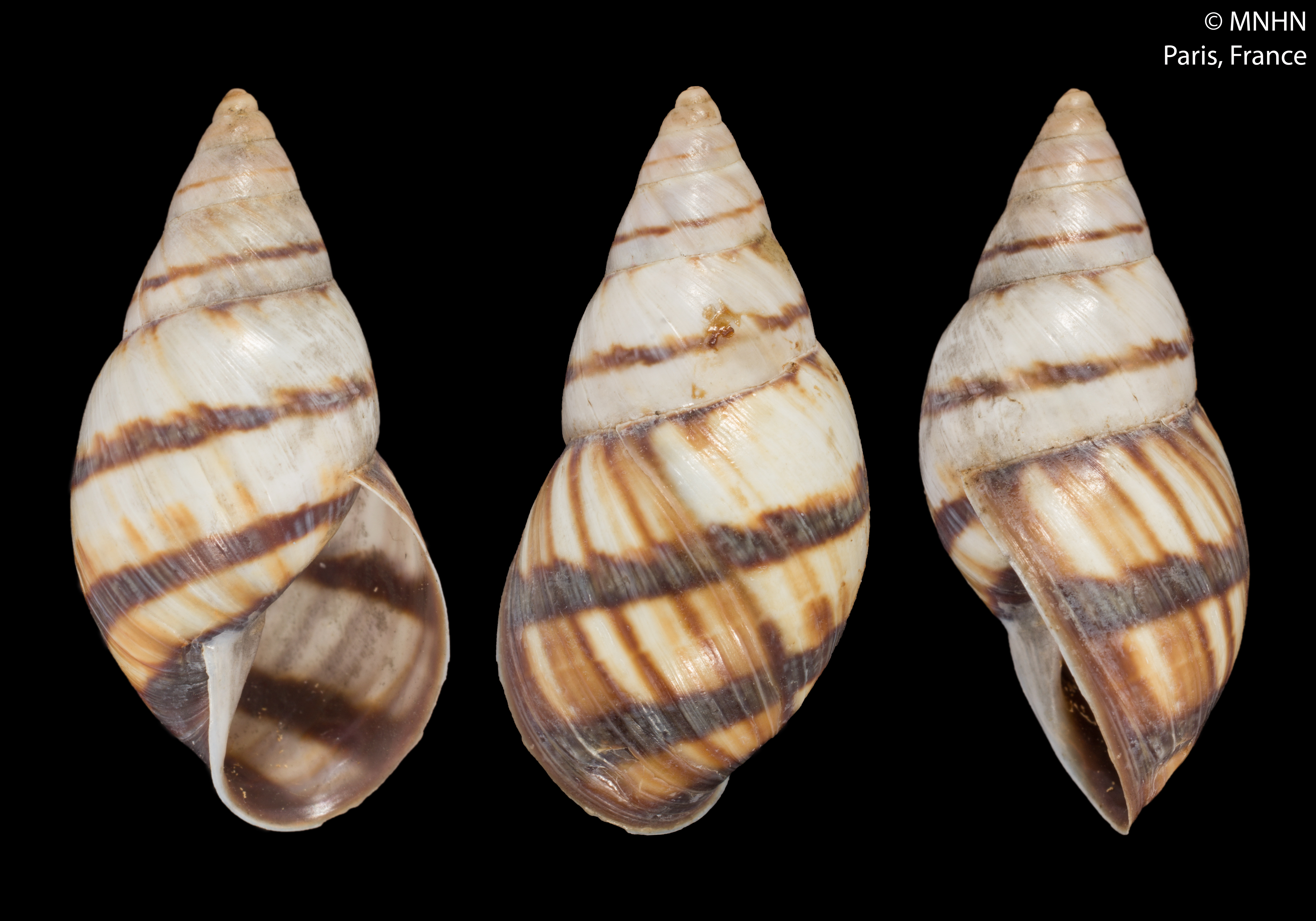
The syntype specimens held at the MNHN illustrate part of the morphological and chromatic variability of the shell of Drymaeus poecilus

== Distribution and habitat ==
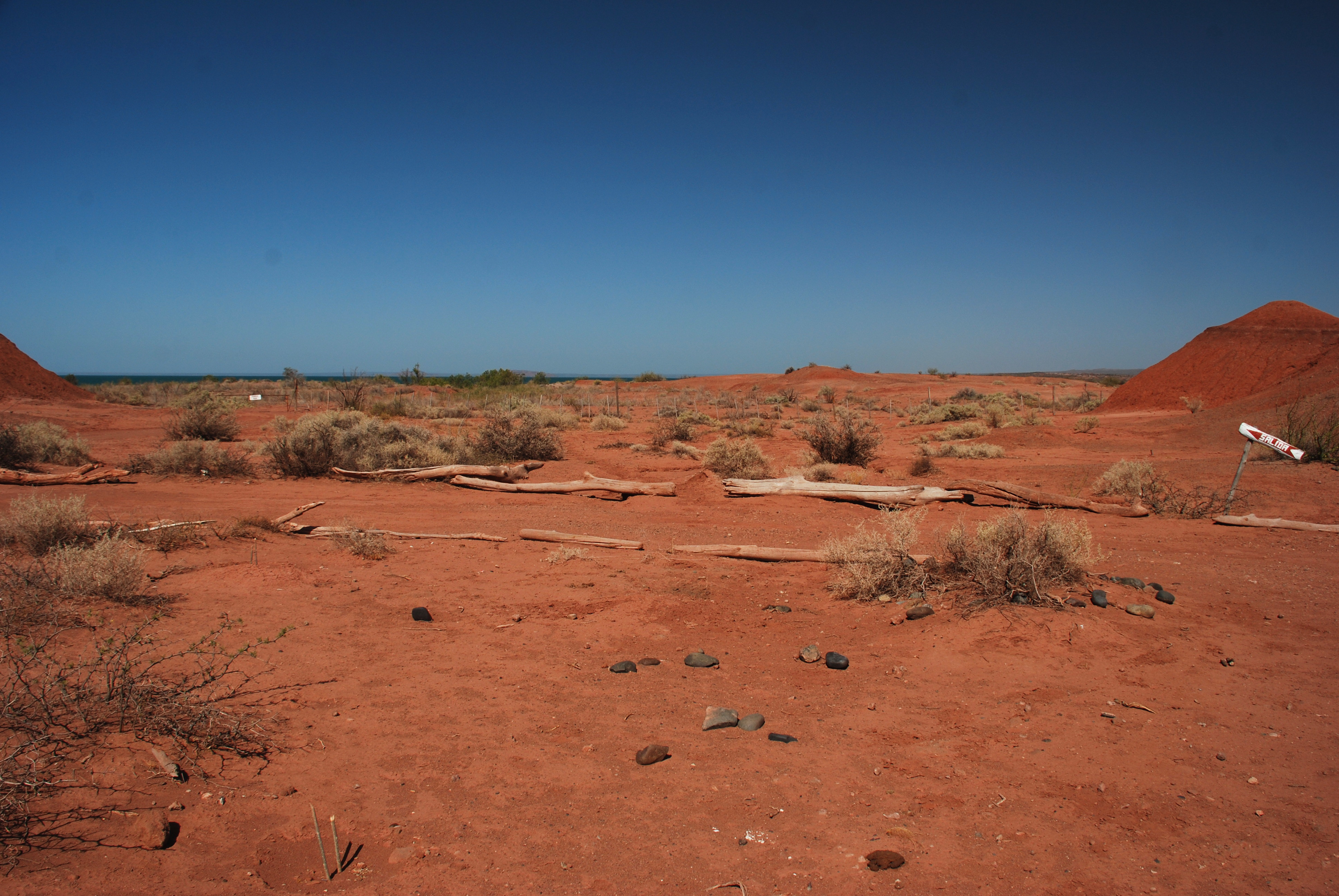
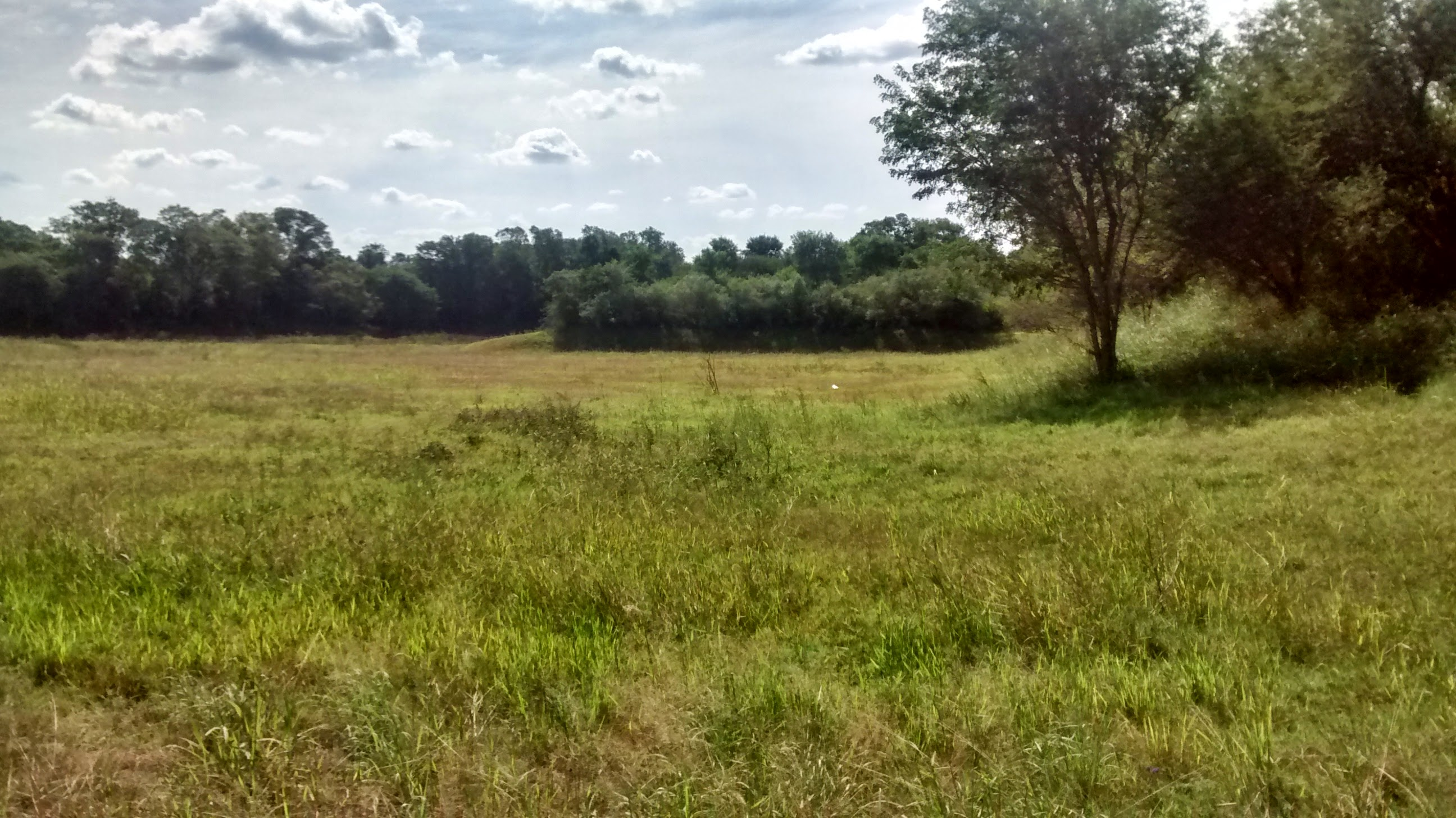
Both dry climate areas such as the Argentine Monte (left) and humid environments such as the Humid Chaco (right) are inhabited by Drymaeus poecilus.

Drymaeus poecilus is native to regions of South America from Bolivia to Argentina, including Paraguay and Brazil. In Argentina, it is known to occur in the northern region of the country in various provinces such as Catamarca, Corrientes, Formosa, Jujuy, Salta, San Juan, Santiago del Estero, and Tucuman. In Brazil, its presence has been recorded in the northern, midwestern and southeastern regions of the country across several states, including Tocantins, Goiás, Mato Grosso, Mato Grosso do Sul, Minas Gerais, and São Paulo. The species inhabits a variety of environments throughout its recorded range, from humid jungles such as the Yungas, to drier areas like the Dry Chaco, as well as other ecoregions such as the Humid Chaco, Alto Paraná, Espinal, and Monte.

=== Ecological interactions ===
Drymaeus poecilus is preyed upon by the generalist omnivore red tegu lizard, Salvator rufescens, though it does not constitute one of the main components of its diet.

== Phylogeny ==
- Peltellinae
  - - Drymaeus cf. schadei
    - Drymaeus dominicus
  - - - Mesembrinus spp.
      - - Antidrymaeus spp.
        - - - Drymaeus serratus
            - - Pseudoxychona dulcis
              - - Peltella palliolum
                - Peltella iheringi
          - Drymaeus poecilus
          - - Drymaeus pamplonensis
            - Drymaeus expansus
            - Drymaeus branneri
          - - Drymaeus castilhensis
            - Drymaeus papyraceus
            - Drymaeus magus

Molecular phylogeny of Drymaeus and related genera after Rosa et al., 2025

Genetic studies using both mitochondrial and nuclear markers, specifically COI, H3, and ITS2/28S, have placed Drymaeus poecilus within a clade that also includes other species from the genera Drymaeus, Pseudoxychona, and Peltella. This group appears to be closely related to species from the genera Mesembrinus and Antidrymaeus. Since the genus Drymaeus is highly diverse, with an estimated 300 species, broader sampling in future molecular analyses may lead to different results regarding its evolutionary relationships (or different phylogenetic tree structures). As it stands, the connections between D. poecilus and related species remain tentative, and current findings are considered preliminary.

== Human use ==
Specimens of Drymaeus poecilus have been recovered from the archaeological site El Pobladito de Ampolla in northwestern Argentina, dated to the first four centuries CE. The shells were found in well-preserved condition, sometimes alongside fragments of other terrestrial gastropods such as Megalobulimus and Plagiodontes. Several D. poecilus shells exhibit signs of intentional modification, suggesting they were used as ornaments or tools. Their presence in domestic contexts, combined with evidence of shell-working and comparisons to similar sites, indicates that these gastropods may have been part of a broader subsistence strategy that included both dietary and utilitarian uses by pre-Hispanic populations.
