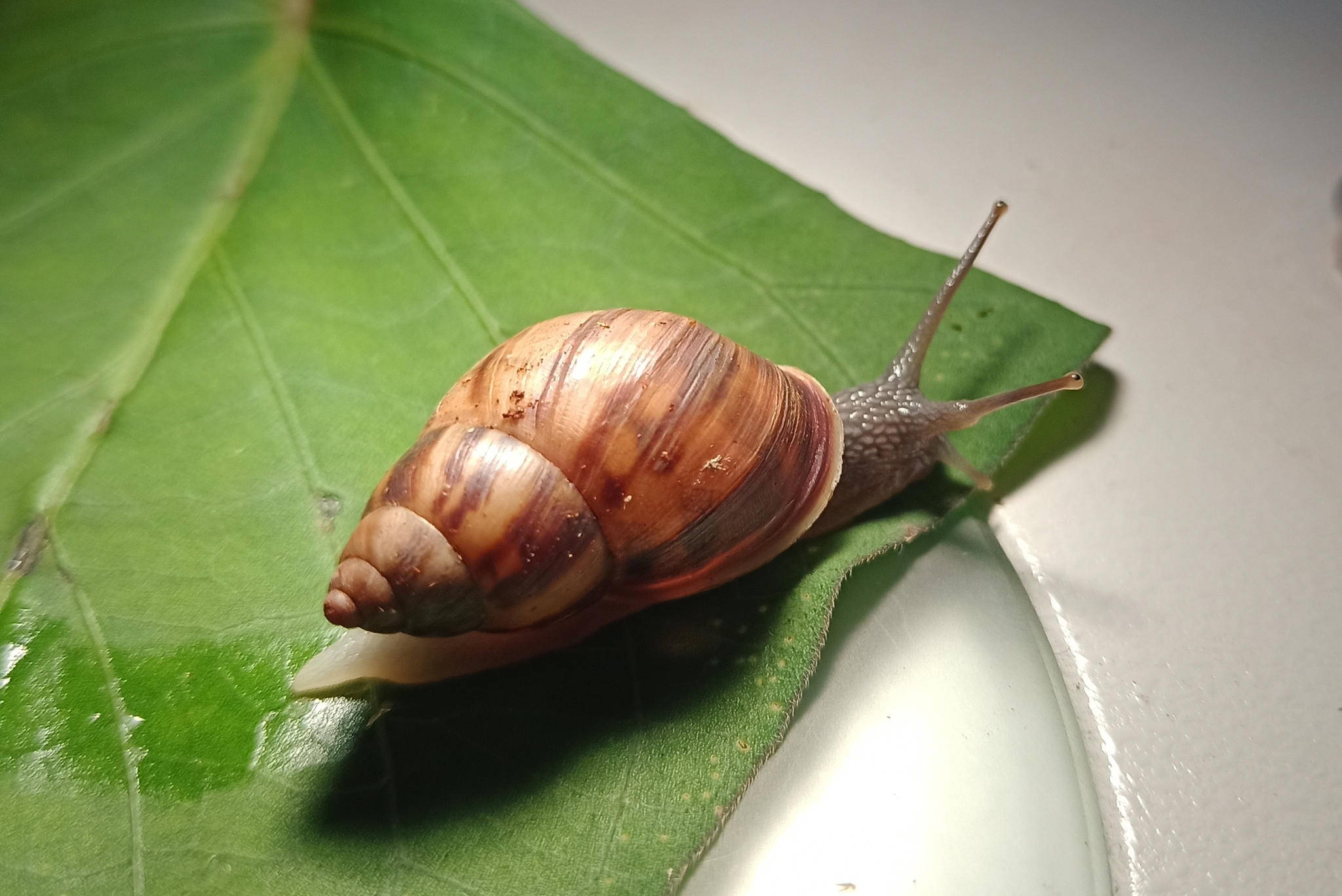
- A live specimen of Drymaeus magus from Ribeirão Preto, Brazil

Scientific classification
- Kingdom: Animalia
- Phylum: Mollusca
- Class: Gastropoda
- Order: Stylommatophora
- Family: Bulimulidae
- Genus: Drymaeus
- Species: D. magus

Binomial name
- Drymaeus magus (Wagner, 1827)

Synonyms
- Bulimus magus Wagner in Spix and Wagner 1827 (basionym); Bulimus inflatus Spix in Spix and Wagner 1827

= Drymaeus magus =

Species of gastropod

Drymaeus magus, commonly known as the magician snail, is a species of tropical air-breathing land snail, a pulmonate gastropod mollusc in the family Bulimulidae found in regions of southeastern Brazil. For nearly two centuries, this species was rarely revisited in scientific literature and was mysteriously absent from scientific collections, often being confused with other members of the genus Drymaeus. Recent studies have revealed that, although it has been poorly documented in the literature, the species is more common than previously thought.

== Taxonomy and nomenclature ==
The species was first described as Bulimus inflatus by Johann Baptist von Spix in 1827 but was later renamed Bulimus magus by Johann Andreas Wagner in the same year due to homonymy issues. The specific epithet magus derives from Latin, meaning magician. By the late 19th century, malacologist Henry Augustus Pilsbry examined a specimen from São Paulo, referring to it as belonging to "Wagner's long-lost species". However, the lack of detailed anatomical studies and its superficial resemblance to Drymaeus papyraceus kept the magician snail on the fringes of malacological research until the 21st century. A study carried out in 2025 was groundbreaking in integrating modern techniques, such as computed tomography and molecular phylogenetics, to re-describe the species and clarify other aspects of its biology and evolutionary relationships.

== Description ==
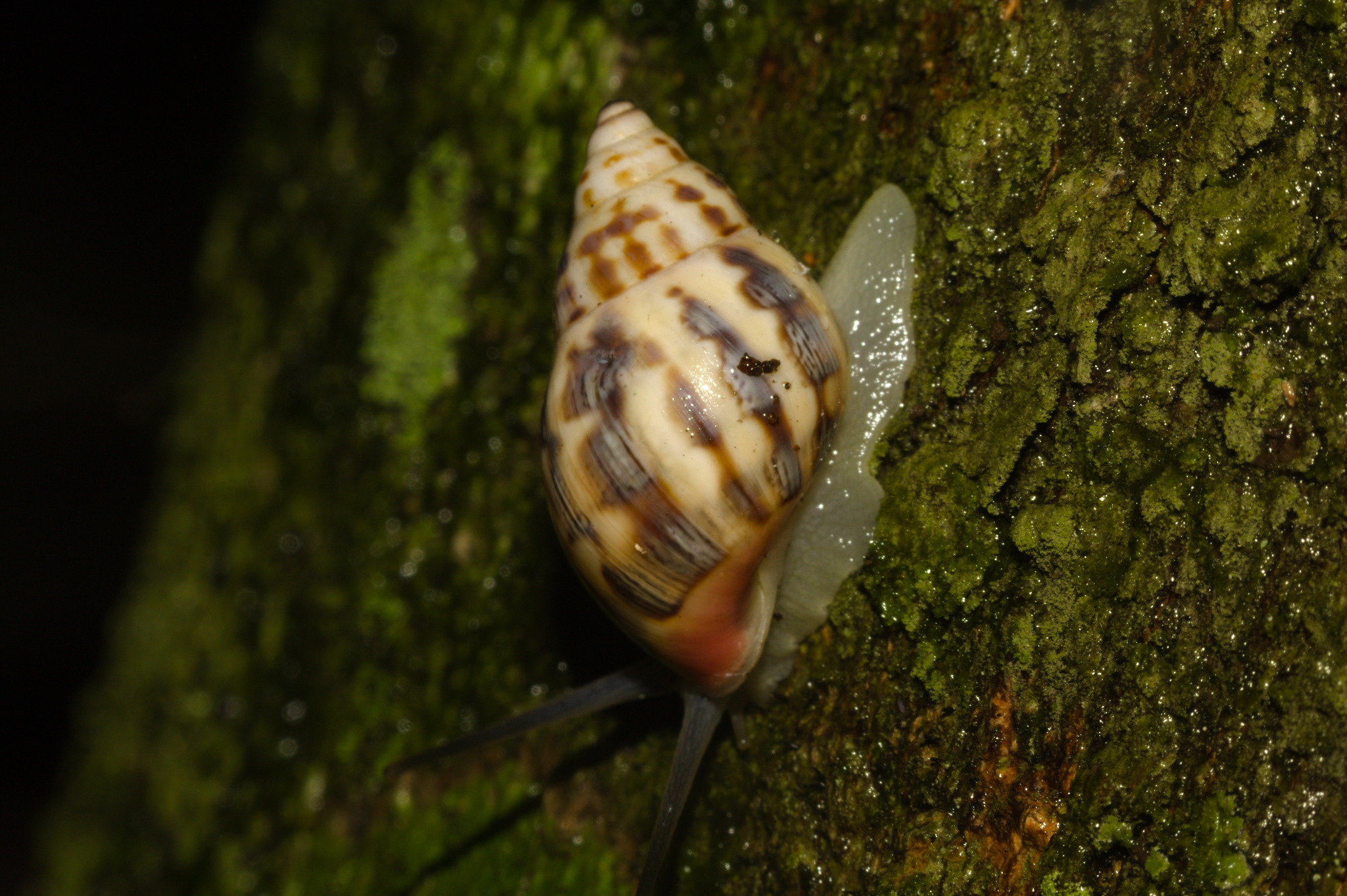
A live specimen of Drymaeus magus form Bodoquena, Mato Grosso do Sul, Brazil

The shell of Drymaeus magus has a typical bulimoid shape and displays a distinctive pattern, with a beige or light-brown base color and sinuous axial streaks (running from base to apex) in darker shades. Two morphological variants have recently been recognized in this species: The typical morphotype has larger shells (22–25 mm in length), with continuous streaks and a duller coloration; and the red-banded morphotype has smaller shells (15–17 mm), more vibrant colors, patterns interrupted by spiral lines, and a reddish area around the umbilicus. Recent micro-computed tomography (micro-CT) reconstructions of internal anatomy have revealed notable adaptations, such as an exceptionally large albumen gland and a reduced penis, distinguishing it from closely related species like Drymaeus castilhensis. The radula features tricuspid teeth (1 rachidian tooth and 63–72 pairs of lateral teeth), with gradual variations toward the margins. This is a trait shared with D. papyraceus, but the radula of D. magus differs in the structure of the central cusp.

== Distribution and ecology ==
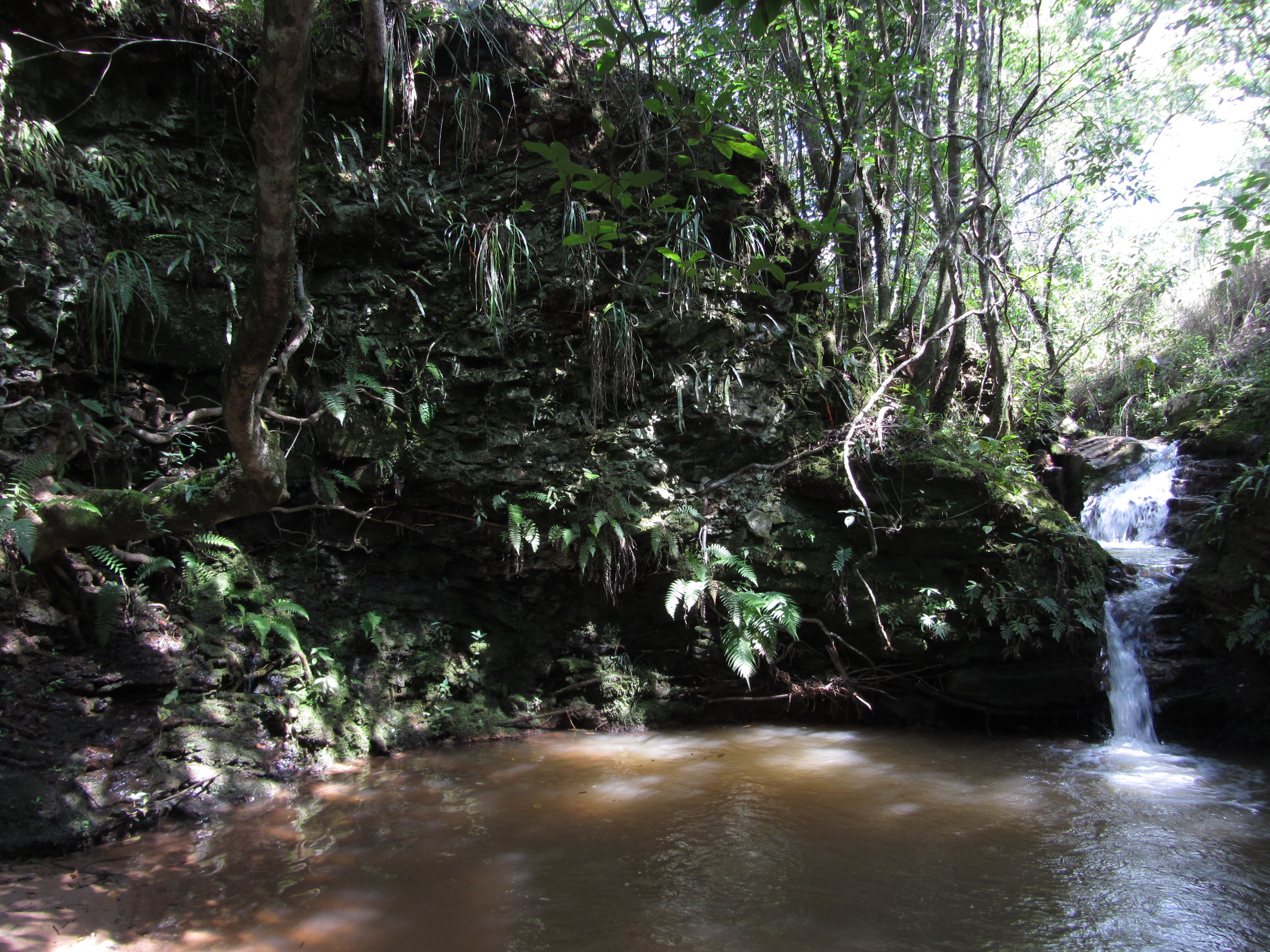
Small waterfall in the Furnas do Bom Jesus State Park, one of the regions inhabited by the magician snail

The magician snail occurs predominantly in semi-deciduous Atlantic Forest fragments and Cerrado (savanna) areas within the states of São Paulo, Minas Gerais, Rio de Janeiro, and Paraná. Isolated records from Rondônia and Mato Grosso do Sul, though intriguing, are likely the result of accidental introductions, given the absence of natural biogeographic connections. This species is arboreal, often found on tree trunks and foliage at night, particularly during the rainy season. Field observations have documented its preference for humid habitats, though it also tolerates disturbed areas such as coffee plantations and urban parks. This ecological plasticity may explain its broad yet long-overlooked distribution.

== Phylogeny ==
- Peltellinae
  - - Drymaeus cf. schadei
    - Drymaeus dominicus
  - - - Mesembrinus spp.
      - - Antidrymaeus spp.
        - - - Drymaeus serratus
            - - Pseudoxychona dulcis
              - - Peltella palliolum
                - Peltella iheringi
          - Drymaeus poecilus
          - - Drymaeus pamplonensis
            - Drymaeus expansus
            - Drymaeus branneri
          - - Drymaeus castilhensis
            - Drymaeus papyraceus
            - Drymaeus magus

Molecular phylogeny of Drymaeus and related genera after Rosa et al., 2025

Genetic studies using both mitochondrial and nuclear markers, specifically COI, H3, and ITS2/28S, placed D. magus within a well-supported clade alongside D. papyraceus and D. castillensis, corroborating their morphological similarities. This group shares a common ancestor with species from the genera Mesembrinus and Antidrymaeus. The close relationship between D. magus and D. papyraceus is further supported by shared radular traits (e.g., tricuspid teeth) and shell morphology. However, D. magus exhibits distinct anatomical adaptations (e.g., reduced penis, enlarged albumen gland), likely reflecting divergent ecological pressures. The diversity of the genus Drymaeus is high, with an estimated 300 species; as such, future molecular analyses may lead to different results regarding its evolutionary relationships (or distinct phylogenetic tree configuration) with the addition of more taxa.

== Conservation status ==
Despite its apparent resilience to disturbed environments, habitat loss due to deforestation cannot be discarded as a potential threat to the magician snail. While the species has not yet been assessed by the IUCN Red List, its broad distribution and occurrence within protected areas, such as Furnas do Bom Jesus State Park (São Paulo), are considered favourable factors for its conservation.
