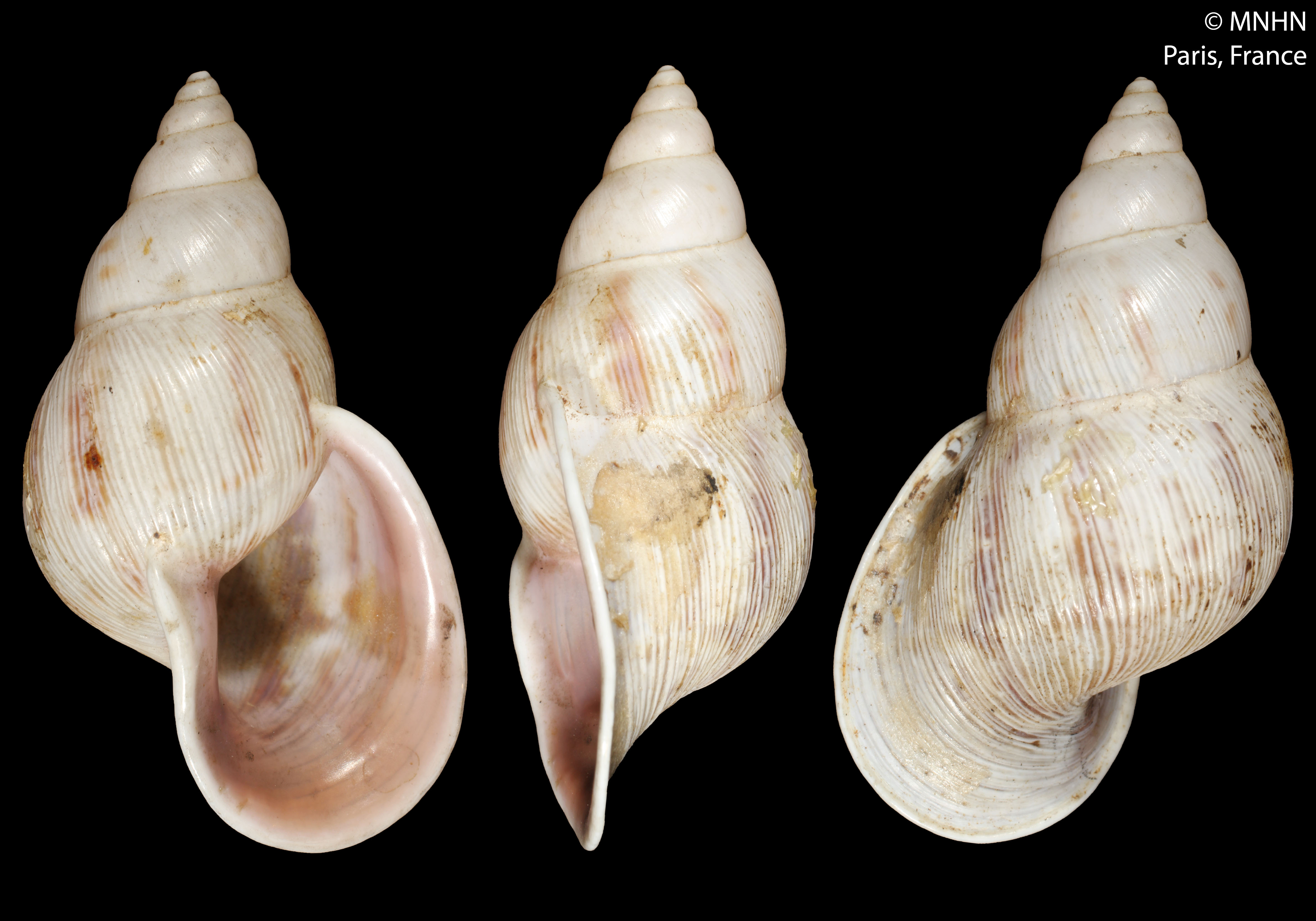
- Different views of a syntype specimen of D. iodostomus, a junior synonym of D. expansus, held at the MNHN, Paris

Scientific classification
- Kingdom: Animalia
- Phylum: Mollusca
- Class: Gastropoda
- Order: Stylommatophora
- Family: Bulimulidae
- Genus: Drymaeus
- Species: D. expansus

Binomial name
- Drymaeus expansus (L. Pfeiffer, 1848)

Synonyms
- List: Bulimus expansus L. Pfeiffer, 1848 (basionym); Bulimus iodostomus Deville & Hupé, 1850; Bulinus pulchellus G. B. Sowerby I, 1838; Drymaeus (Drymaeus) expansus (L. Pfeiffer, 1848); Drymaeus (Drymaeus) expansus altorum (Weyrauch, 1958); Drymaeus (Drymaeus) expansus flavilabrum Weyrauch, 1967; Drymaeus (Drymaeus) expansus perenensis S. I. Da Costa, 1901; Drymaeus (Drymaeus) expansus subprotractus Pilsbry, 1901; Drymaeus (Drymaeus) iodostomus (Deville & Hupé, 1850); Drymaeus (Drymaeus) rehderi J. J. Parodiz, 1963; Drymaeus expansus altorum (Weyrauch, 1958); Drymaeus expansus balboa Pilsbry, 1926; Drymaeus expansus flavilabrum Weyrauch, 1967; Drymaeus expansus perenensis S. I. Da Costa, 1901; Drymaeus expansus subprotractus Pilsbry, 1901; Drymaeus expansus vanattai Pilsbry, 1898; Drymaeus iodostomus (Deville & Hupé, 1850); Drymaeus rehderi J. J. Parodiz, 1963; Drymaeus vanattai Pilsbry, 1898; Mesembrinus (Mormus) expansus (L. Pfeiffer, 1848); Mesembrinus (Mormus) expansus altorum Weyrauch, 1958; Mesembrinus (Mormus) expansus orcesi Weyrauch, 1958; Mesembrinus expansus (L. Pfeiffer, 1848); Mesembrinus expansus orcesi Weyrauch, 1958

= Drymaeus expansus =

Species of gastropod

Drymaeus expansus is a species of tropical air-breathing land snail, a pulmonate gastropod mollusc in the family Bulimulidae that is native to parts of South America. It was described in 1848, with Huallaga, in Peru, as the type locality. The animal has a streaked shell, white to brownish in color, measuring 40 mm in length and 22 mm in width with 7 whorls. It has an open umbilicus and is densely striated longitudinally, also featuring a markedly expanded peristome in all directions.

Phylogenetic analyses based on genetic markers place Drymaeus expansus in a clade that also includes the species D. branneri and D. pamplonensis. However, given the great diversity of the genus Drymaeus and the small number of species analyzed, these data are still considered preliminary.

== Taxonomy and nomenclature ==
The species was first described in 1848 by German conchologist Ludwig Karl Georg Pfeiffer as Bulimus expansus. Pfeiffer mentioned the Amazonian region of Huallaga, in Peru, as the type locality. The specific epithet expansus originates from Latin, meaning "stretched" or "extended".

According to MolluscaBase, the mollusk-oriented branch of WoRMS, Drymaeus expansus includes two subspecies: Drymaeus expansus expansus, the nominate subspecies, and Drymaeus expansus scitus (H. Adams, 1867).

== Description ==
The shell of Drymaeus expansus has an ovate-pyramidal shape with brownish-white base color ornamented by fulminate (lightning-like) brownish streaks. It attains a length of 40 mm and diameter of 22 mm at around 7 whorls. The body whorl is nearly equivalent to the spire in length. The shell is densely striated longitudinally and also perforated, meaning it has an opened umbilicus. The aperture is colored violet internally, the columella presents an internal fold, and the peristome is distinctly slanted, extending outwards in all directions.

== Phylogeny ==
- Peltellinae
  - - Drymaeus cf. schadei
    - Drymaeus dominicus
  - - - Mesembrinus spp.
      - - Antidrymaeus spp.
        - - - Drymaeus serratus
            - - Pseudoxychona dulcis
              - - Peltella palliolum
                - Peltella iheringi
          - Drymaeus poecilus
          - - Drymaeus pamplonensis
            - Drymaeus expansus
            - Drymaeus branneri
          - - Drymaeus castilhensis
            - Drymaeus papyraceus
            - Drymaeus magus

Molecular phylogeny of Drymaeus and related genera after Rosa et al., 2025

Genetic studies using both mitochondrial and nuclear markers, specifically COI, H3, and ITS2/28S, have placed Drymaeus expansus within a clade that also includes Drymaeus pamplonensis and Drymaeus branneri. This group appears to be closely related to species from the genera Mesembrinus and Antidrymaeus. The genus Drymaeus, however, is highly diverse, with an estimated 300 species, and more comprehensive samplings in future analyses may lead to different phylogenetic tree structures. As it stands, the connections between D. expansus and related species remain tentative, and current findings are considered preliminary.
