= Drymaeus acervatus =

Conservation status
- Vulnerable (IUCN 2.3)

Scientific classification
- Kingdom: Animalia
- Phylum: Mollusca
- Class: Gastropoda
- Order: Stylommatophora
- Family: Bulimulidae
- Genus: Drymaeus
- Species: D. acervatus

Binomial name
- Drymaeus acervatus Pfeiffer, 1857

Synonyms
- Orymaeus acervatus Pfeiffer, 1857 [orth. error]

Species of gastropod

Drymaeus acervatus is a species of tropical air-breathing land snail, a terrestrial pulmonate gastropod mollusk in the family Bulimulidae.
