= Antidrymaeus interpunctus =

Scientific classification
- Kingdom: Animalia
- Phylum: Mollusca
- Class: Gastropoda
- Order: Stylommatophora
- Family: Bulimulidae
- Genus: Antidrymaeus
- Species: A. interpunctus

Binomial name
- Antidrymaeus interpunctus (E. von Martens, 1886)

Synonyms
- Bulimulus interpunctus E. von Martens, 1886 (basionym); Drymaeus interpunctus (E. von Martens, 1886); Mesembrinus interpunctus (E. von Martens, 1886)

Species of gastropod

Antidrymaeus interpunctus is a species of tropical air-breathing land snail, a pulmonate gastropod mollusc in the family Bulimulidae.
