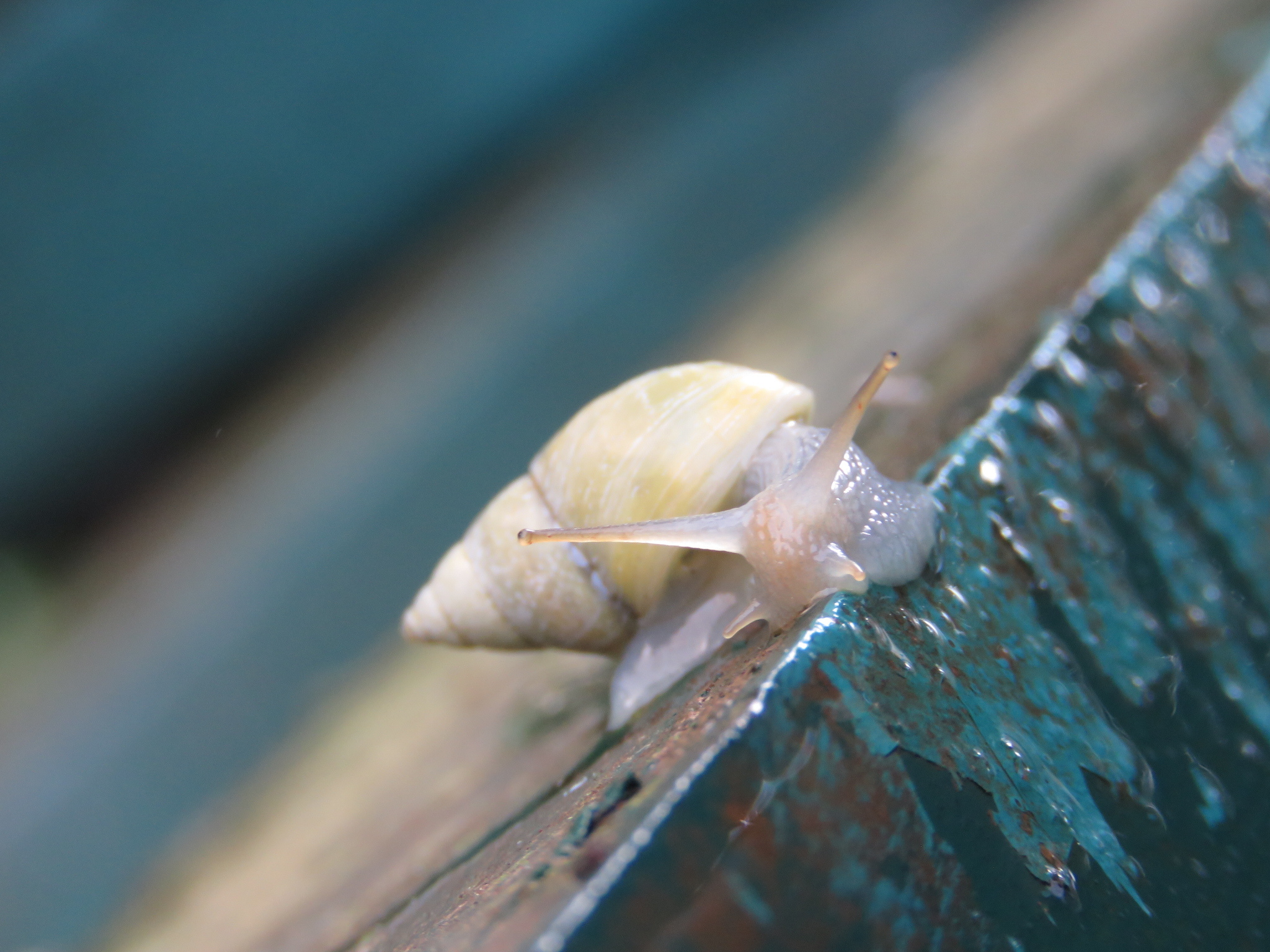
- Live specimen of Drymaeus muelleggeri at Iguazu Falls

Scientific classification
- Domain: Eukaryota
- Kingdom: Animalia
- Phylum: Mollusca
- Class: Gastropoda
- Order: Stylommatophora
- Family: Bulimulidae
- Genus: Drymaeus
- Species: D. muelleggeri

Binomial name
- Drymaeus muelleggeri Jaeckel, 1927

= Drymaeus muelleggeri =

Species of gastropod

Drymaeus muelleggeri is a species of tropical air-breathing land snail, a pulmonate gastropod mollusk in the family Bulimulidae.
