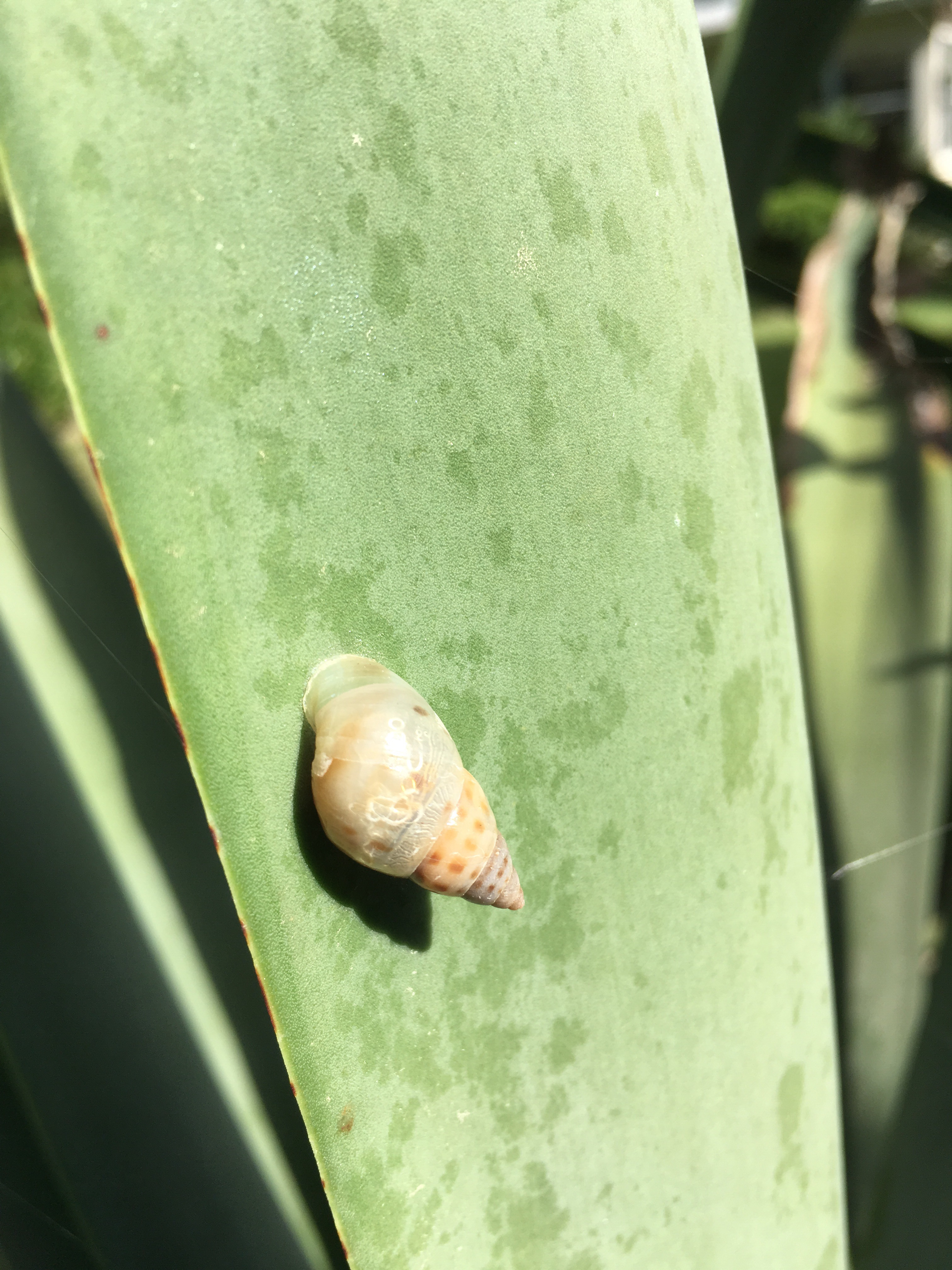
- Antidrymaeus dormani in Gainesville, Florida

Conservation status
- Imperiled (NatureServe)

Scientific classification
- Kingdom: Animalia
- Phylum: Mollusca
- Class: Gastropoda
- Order: Stylommatophora
- Family: Bulimulidae
- Genus: Antidrymaeus
- Species: A. dormani

Binomial name
- Antidrymaeus dormani (W. G. Binney, 1857)

Synonyms
- Drymaeus dormani

= Antidrymaeus dormani =

Species of gastropod

Antidrymaeus dormani, also known as the manatee treesnail, is a species of terrestrial snail in the family Bulimulidae.

These snails were once used to control sooty mold on citrus trees in central Florida.

== Distribution ==
This species occurs in northern and central Florida, north of Lake Okeechobee.
