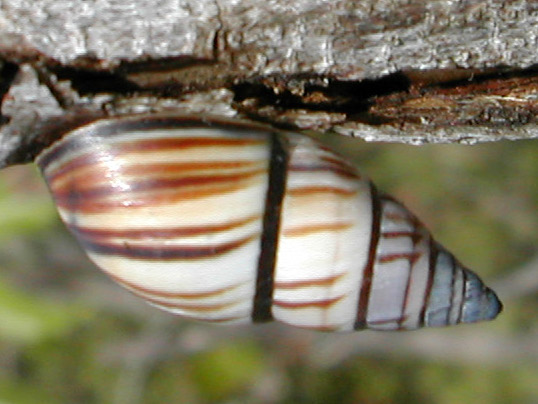
- Mesembrinus multilineatus on a tree branch.

Conservation status
- Secure (NatureServe)

Scientific classification
- Kingdom: Animalia
- Phylum: Mollusca
- Class: Gastropoda
- Order: Stylommatophora
- Family: Bulimulidae
- Genus: Mesembrinus
- Species: M. multilineatus

Binomial name
- Mesembrinus multilineatus (Say, 1825)

Synonyms
- Bulimus andicola L. Pfeiffer, 1847 (junior synonym); Bulimus menkei Gruner, 1841 (junior synonym); Bulimus multilineatus Say, 1825; Bulimus parvus I. Lea, 1838 (junior synonym); Bulimus sisalensis Morelet, 1849 (junior synonym); Drymaeus (Mesembrinus) andicola (L. Pfeiffer, 1847); Drymaeus (Mesembrinus) multilineatus (Say, 1825)· accepted, alternate representation; Drymaeus andicola (L. Pfeiffer, 1847); Drymaeus multilineatus latizonatus Pilsbry, 1936

= Mesembrinus multilineatus =

Species of gastropod

Mesembrinus multilineatus (formerly Drymaeus multilineatus), common name the lined treesnail, is a species of medium-sized air-breathing, tropical land snail, a terrestrial pulmonate gastropod mollusk in the family Bulimulidae.

== Distribution ==
This species occurs in Florida, USA and Yucatan, Mexico. It has also beem introduced to Guam.
