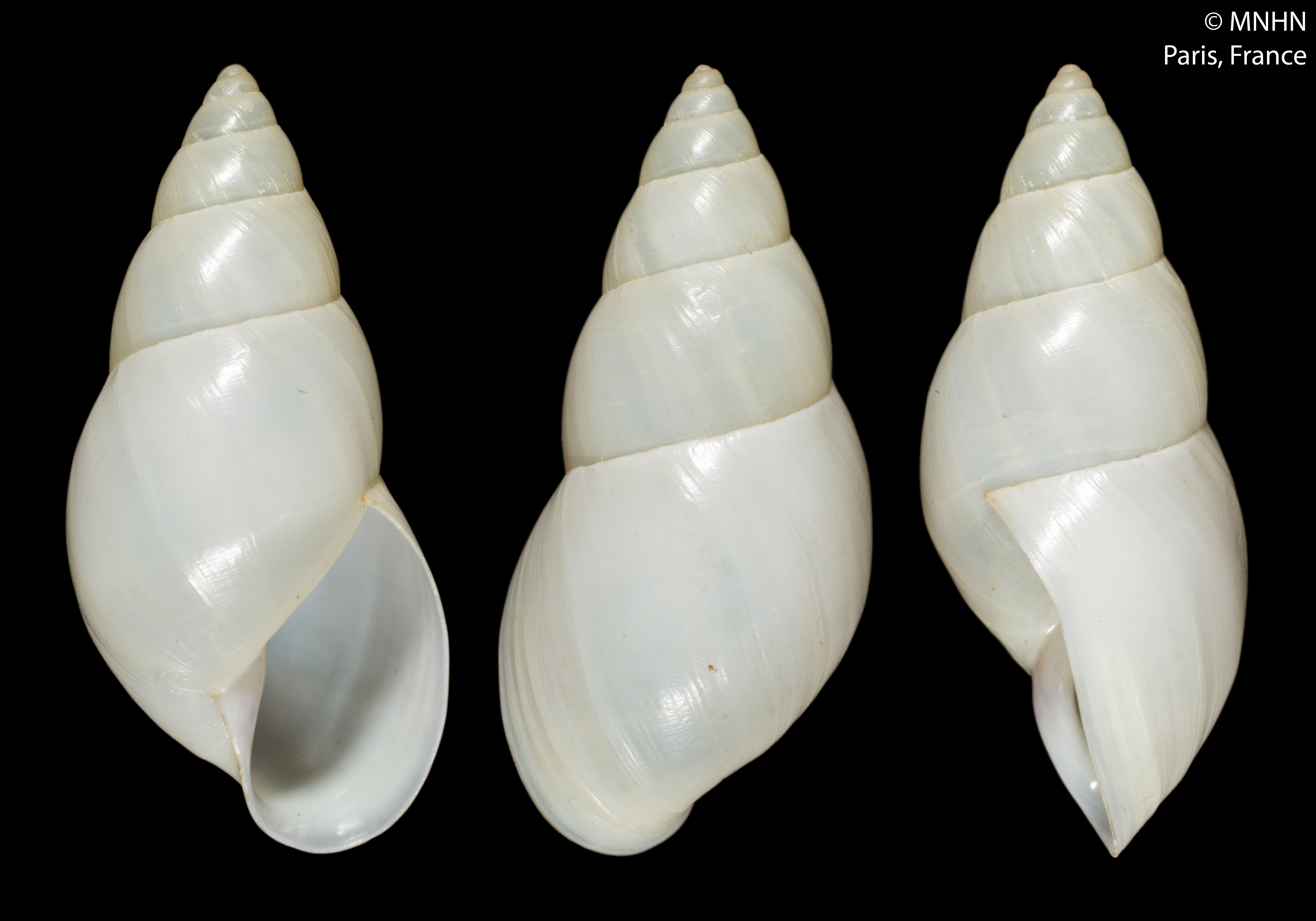

Scientific classification
- Kingdom: Animalia
- Phylum: Mollusca
- Class: Gastropoda
- Order: Stylommatophora
- Family: Bulimulidae
- Genus: Antidrymaeus
- Species: A. sulphureus

Binomial name
- Antidrymaeus sulphureus (Pfeiffer, 1856)

Synonyms
- Drymaeus sulphureus

= Antidrymaeus sulphureus =

Species of gastropod

Antidrymaeus sulphureus is a species of tropical air-breathing land snail, a pulmonate gastropod mollusk in the family Bulimulidae. It is found in tropical America.
