= El Pobladito de Ampolla =

Archaeological site in Salta, Argentina

El Pobladito de Ampolla is an archaeological site located in the Quebrada de Ampolla, near the town of San Antonio de los Cobres, in Salta Province, northwestern Argentina. The site is situated at an altitude of approximately 3,800 meters above sea level in the southern sector of the Argentine Puna.

== Archaeological context ==
El Pobladito de Ampolla is one of the few known early village settlements in the southern Puna region. It consists of multiple domestic structures, storage units, and refuse deposits distributed across a rocky slope. Radiocarbon dating from the site, particularly from the refuse mound designated Ampolla 10, indicates human occupation during the first four centuries CE. Ceramic remains at the site are associated with the Condorhuasi and Cortaderas cultural styles, which further support this chronological framework.

== Faunal remains ==
Excavations at El Pobladito de Ampolla have yielded a rich assemblage of faunal remains, reflecting a diversified subsistence strategy. These include camelids (mainly Lama spp.), rodents, birds, fish, and a notable variety of land snails. Among the mollusks, well-preserved shells of Drymaeus poecilus were particularly abundant, along with fragments of Megalobulimus and Plagiodontes. Some of these shells show signs of anthropogenic modification, indicating their use as ornaments or tools. The evidence suggests that land snails may have served both dietary and utilitarian roles.

== Cultural context ==
The site provides insight into the early village life in the high-altitude environment of the Argentine Puna. The inhabitants of El Pobladito de Ampolla appear to have practiced a generalist subsistence strategy, exploiting a range of local resources. The presence of ceramic styles, architectural remains, and modified mollusk shells points to a community engaged in complex interactions with its environment, including resource processing, ornament production, and possibly trade or symbolic practices.
