= Drymaeus eurystomus =

Scientific classification
- Kingdom: Animalia
- Phylum: Mollusca
- Class: Gastropoda
- Order: Stylommatophora
- Family: Bulimulidae
- Genus: Drymaeus
- Species: D. eurystomus

Binomial name
- Drymaeus eurystomus (Philippi, 1867)

Synonyms
- Bulimus eurystomus Philippi, 1867; Bulimus hamadryas Philippi, 1867

Species of gastropod

Drymaeus eurystomus is a species of tropical air-breathing land snail, a pulmonate gastropod mollusk in the family Bulimulidae.

Fulton (1905) was the first to realize that Bulimus eurystomus Philippi, 1867 and Bulimus hamadryas Philippi, 1867 are synonyms and only differ in colour pattern.

== Distribution ==
- Peru
