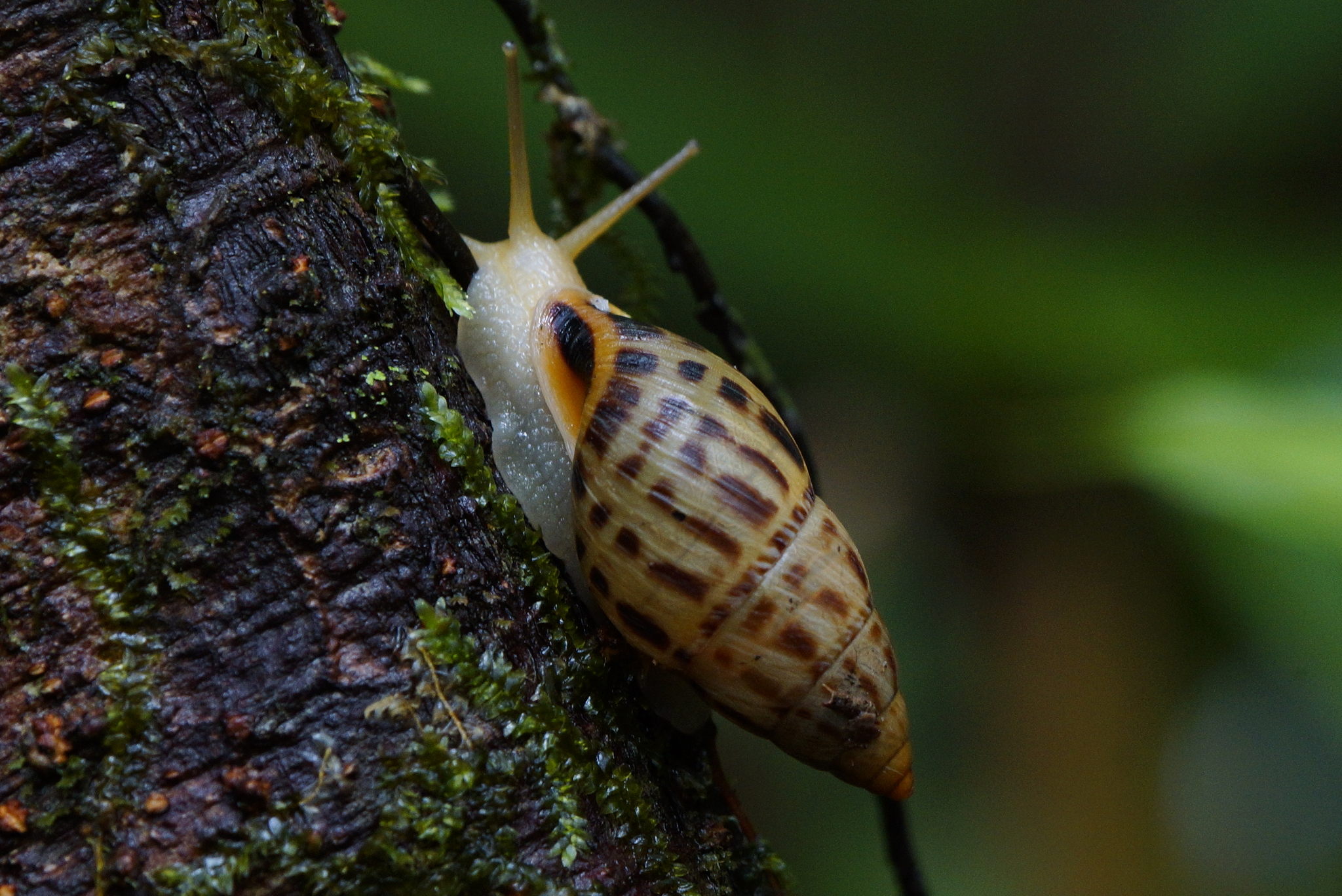
- A live specimen of Drymaeus ribeiroi at Alta Floresta, Mato Grosso, Brazil
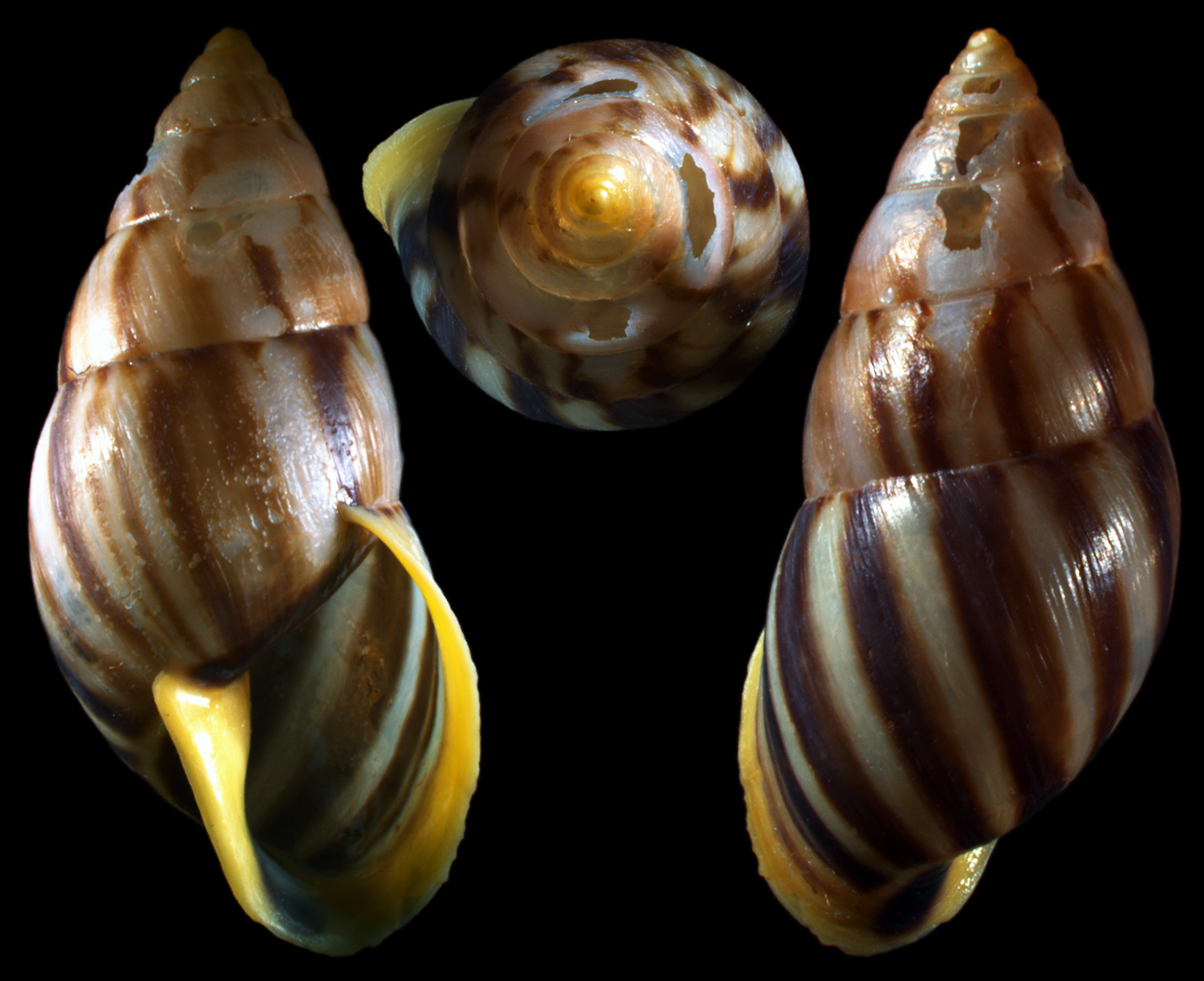
- Apertural (left), apical (center) and dorsal (right) views of a shell of Drymaeus ribeiroi from Brazil

Scientific classification
- Kingdom: Animalia
- Phylum: Mollusca
- Class: Gastropoda
- Order: Stylommatophora
- Family: Bulimulidae
- Genus: Drymaeus
- Species: D. ribeiroi

Binomial name
- Drymaeus ribeiroi Ihering, 1915

Synonyms
- Drymaeus nigrogularis ribeiroi Ihering, 1915 (basionym)

= Drymaeus ribeiroi =

Species of gastropod

Drymaeus ribeiroi is a species of tropical air-breathing land snail, a terrestrial pulmonate gastropod mollusk in the family Bulimulidae.

== Taxonomy and etymology ==
Drymaeus ribeiroi was first described in 1915 by the German-Brazilian naturalist Hermann von Ihering. The description was based on a single empty shell collected in Salto Alegre, a small village on the banks of the Jauru River in southwestern Mato Grosso, Brazil, by an expedition carried out by the Rondon Commission. The Commission was established in 1907 by the Brazilian government to build a telegraph network connecting the central-western region to the Amazon. Led by then-Major Cândido Mariano da Silva Rondon, it played a key role in the territorial integration of Brazil and the expansion of national communications infrastructure. In addition to its technical mission, the commission carried out significant scientific work in geography, ethnography, botany, zoology, astronomy, and geology.

The Rondon Commission expeditions resulted in the mapping of previously unknown rivers, the documentation of various Indigenous peoples, and the collection of thousands of plant and animal specimens, many of which were described for the first time by Brazilian science, such as D. ribeiroi. Initially, it was named Drymaeus nigrogularis ribeiroi, as a subspecies of Drymaeus nigrogularis (Dohrn, 1882). However, it was later recognized as a distinct species. The specific name ribeiroi honors the Brazilian herpetologist Alípio de Miranda Ribeiro.
