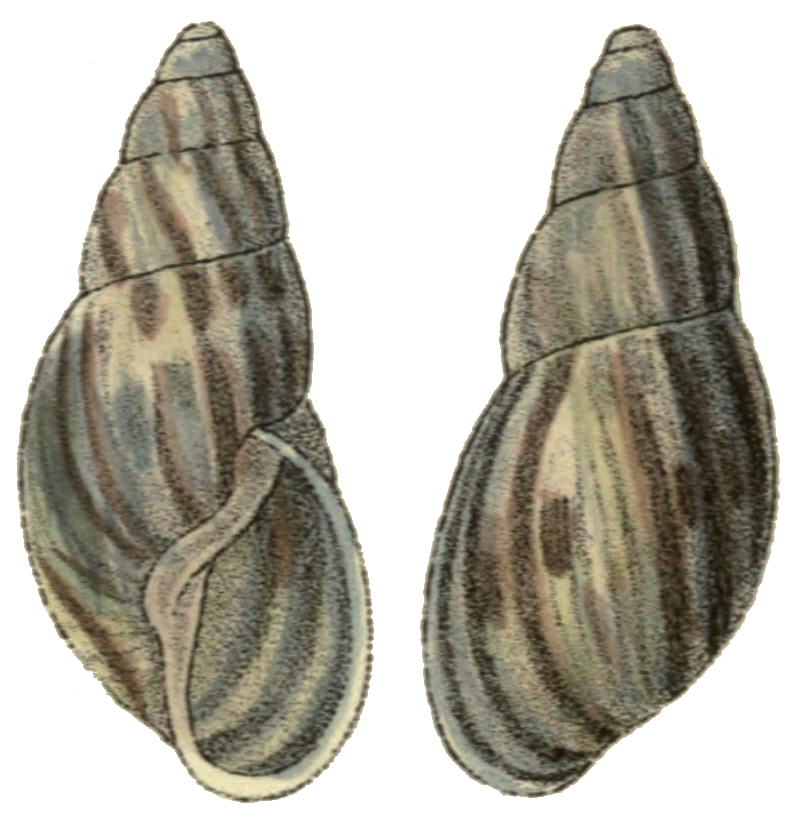
- Drawing of apertural and abapertural views of a shell of Drymaeus henselii.

Conservation status
- Vulnerable (IUCN 2.3)

Scientific classification
- Kingdom: Animalia
- Phylum: Mollusca
- Class: Gastropoda
- Order: Stylommatophora
- Family: Bulimulidae
- Genus: Drymaeus
- Species: D. henselii

Binomial name
- Drymaeus henselii (Martens, 1868)

Synonyms
- Anthinus henselii (Martens, 1868); Bulimulus henselii Martens, 1868; Drymaeus henseli (Martens, 1868); Gonyostomus (Anthinus) henseli (Martens, 1868)

= Drymaeus henselii =

Species of gastropod

Drymaeus henselii is a species of air-breathing land snail, a terrestrial gastropod mollusk in the family Bulimulidae.

This species was originally described by Eduard von Martens as Bulimulus henselii in 1868. The specific name is in honor of the German naturalist, paleontologist and zoologist Reinhold Friedrich Hensel (1826–1881), who collected the first two specimens from which the species was described.

The type locality is Costa da Serra in the state Rio Grande do Sul, which is the southernmost State of Brazil. This species is endemic to Brazil.

This species is accidentally listed twice in the Checklist of Rio Grande do Sul State (2009): as Drymaeus henselii (Martens, 1868) (subfamily Bulimulinae, family Orthalicidae) and as Gonyostomus henselii (Martens, 1868) in family Strophocheilidae. This species also inhabits Santa Catarina in Brazil (listed as Drymaeus henselii (Martens, 1868)).

== Description ==
The shell is perforate, ovate-turreted, irregularly striate and sculptured with very delicate, very close spiral lines. The color of the shell is whitish, painted with brown streaks, which are confluent in the middle of each whorl. The apex is obtuse, brownish. The shell has 6 whorls, that are rather flattened. The suture is irregularly undulating. The last whorl is little convex below.

The aperture is subvertical, ovate-oblong, nearly half the length of the shell. The peristome is a little thickened, lightly spreading and white. The columellar margin is dilated, not closing the perforation, expanded above in a parietal lamina. Columella itself is twisted.

The length of the shell is 40 mm. The width of the shell is 28 mm. The height of the aperture is 20 mm. The width of the aperture is 11 mm.
