= Drymaeus dakryodes =

Scientific classification
- Kingdom: Animalia
- Phylum: Mollusca
- Class: Gastropoda
- Order: Stylommatophora
- Family: Bulimulidae
- Genus: Drymaeus
- Species: D. dakryodes

Binomial name
- Drymaeus dakryodes Salvador, Cavallari & Simone, 2015

Species of gastropod

Drymaeus dakryodes is a species of tropical air-breathing land snail, a pulmonate gastropod mollusc in the family Bulimulidae.
