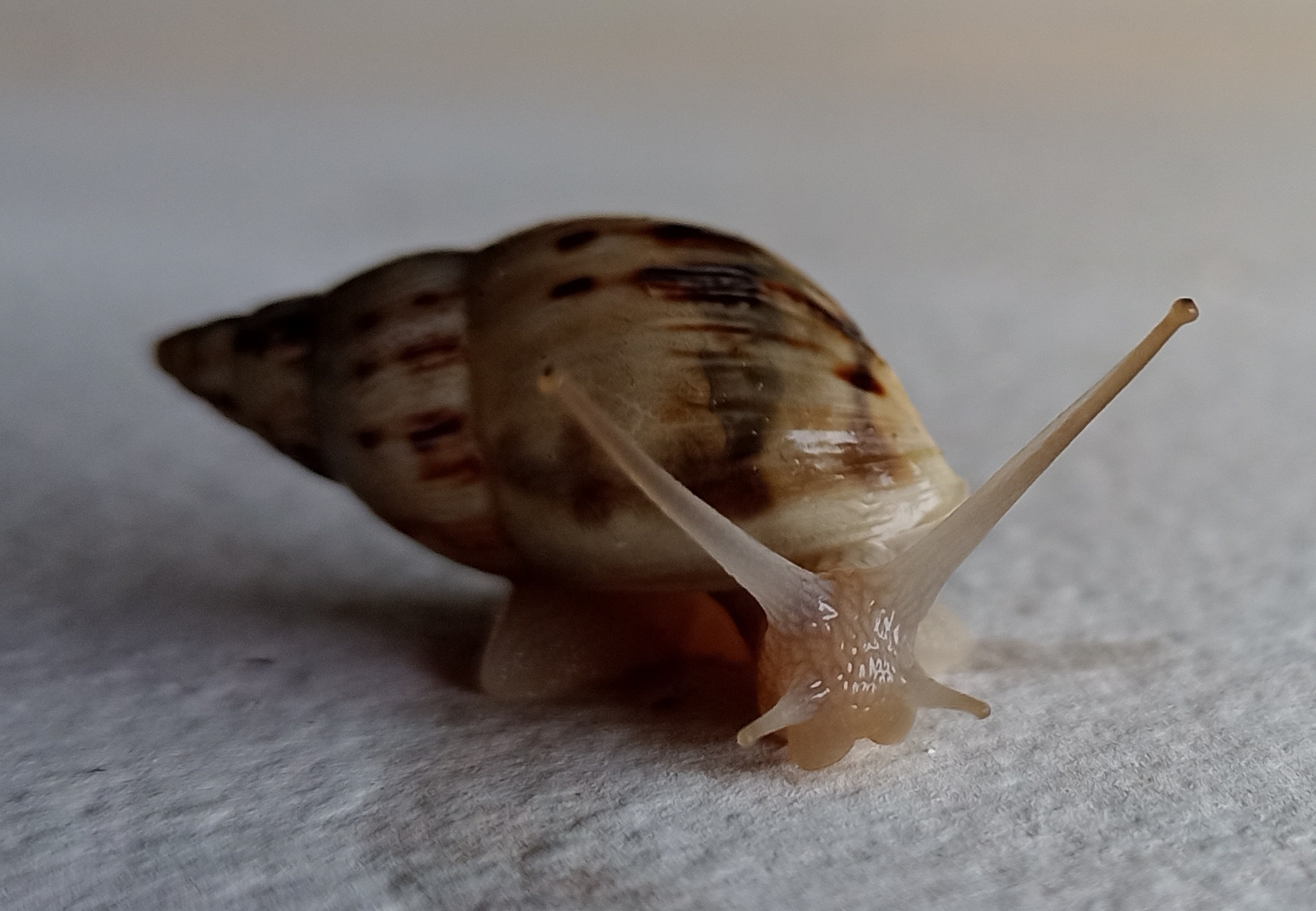
- A live specimen of Drymaeus papyraceus

Scientific classification
- Kingdom: Animalia
- Phylum: Mollusca
- Class: Gastropoda
- Order: Stylommatophora
- Family: Bulimulidae
- Genus: Drymaeus
- Species: D. papyraceus

Binomial name
- Drymaeus papyraceus (Mawe, 1823)

Synonyms
- Bulimulus papyraceus (Mawe, 1823); Bulimulus papyraceus var. latior Strebel, 1882; Bulimus lita (Quoy & Gaimard, 1825); Drymaeus (Drymaeus) papyraceus (Mawe, 1823); Drymaeus papyraceus var. papyrifactus Pilsbry, 1898; Helix lita Quoy & Gaimard, 1825; Helix papyracea Mawe, 1823 (basionym); Otostomus (Mormus) papyraceus (Mawe, 1823)

= Drymaeus papyraceus =

Species of gastropod

Drymaeus papyraceus, commonly known as the fragile snail, is a species of tropical air-breathing land snail, a pulmonate gastropod mollusc in the family Bulimulidae native to parts of South America.

== Taxonomy and nomenclature ==
The species was first described in 1823 by British zoologist and mineralogist John Mawe, who originally named it Helix papyracea and referred to it by the common name "fragile snail." Today, it is classified within the genus Drymaeus, which includes a wide variety of Neotropical land snails.

== Conservation status ==
While the fragile snail has not yet been evaluated by the IUCN, deforestation in Brazil's Atlantic Forest has reduced its habitat by ca. 84–88% since it was described in the 19th Century.
