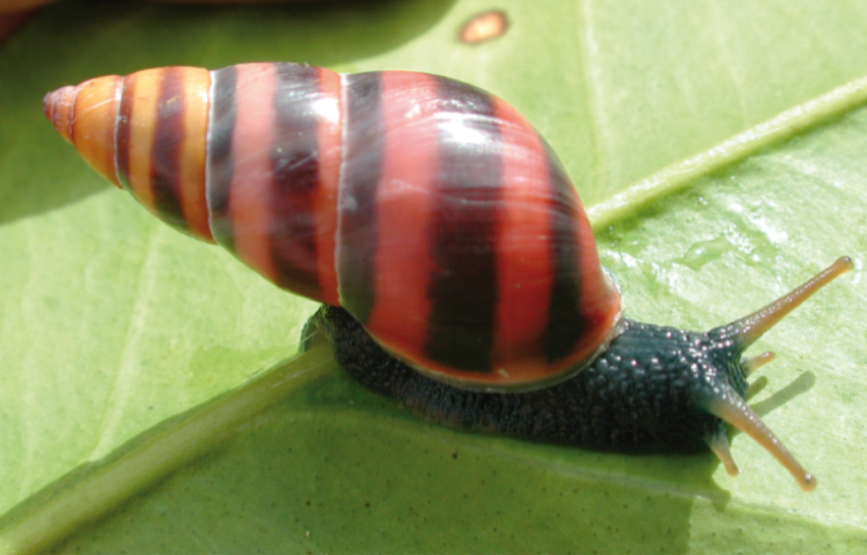
- Antidrymaeus laticinctus in the Lesser Antilles

Scientific classification
- Kingdom: Animalia
- Phylum: Mollusca
- Class: Gastropoda
- Order: Stylommatophora
- Family: Bulimulidae
- Genus: Antidrymaeus; Germain, 1907

Species
- See text

Synonyms
- Drymaeus (Antidrymaeus) Germain, 1907

= Antidrymaeus =

Genus of gastropods

Antidrymaeus is a genus of tropical land snails, terrestrial pulmonate gastropod molluscs in the subfamily Peltellinae of the family Bulimulidae.

Antidrymaeus was previously considered a subgenus of Drymaeus, but research published in 2023 has elevated the taxon to genus.

== Species ==
Currently, these species are included in Antidrymaeus.

- Antidrymaeus dormani (W. G. Binney, 1857)
- Antidrymaeus immaculatus (C. B. Adams, 1850)
- Antidrymaeus interpunctus (E. von Martens, 1866)
- Antidrymaeus inusitatus (Fulton, 1900)
- Antidrymaeus laticinctus (Guppy, 1868)
- Antidrymaeus multifasciatus (Lamarck, 1822)
- Antidrymaeus rufescens (J. E. Gray, 1825)
- Antidrymaeus stramineus (Guilding, 1824)
- Antidrymaeus sulphureus (L. Pfeiffer, 1857)
