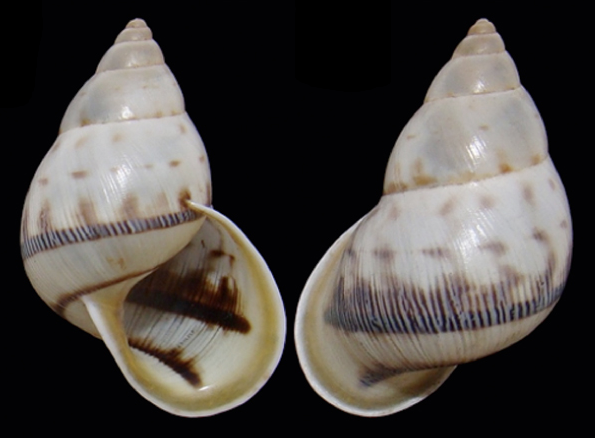
- Drymaeus branneri. shell height 27.0 mm

Scientific classification
- Domain: Eukaryota
- Kingdom: Animalia
- Phylum: Mollusca
- Class: Gastropoda
- Order: Stylommatophora
- Family: Bulimulidae
- Genus: Drymaeus
- Species: D. branneri

Binomial name
- Drymaeus branneri F. Baker, 1914

= Drymaeus branneri =

Species of gastropod

Drymaeus branneri is a species of tropical air-breathing land snail, a pulmonate gastropod mollusk in the family Bulimulidae.

== Distribution ==
The type locality of Drymaeus branneri is above Porto Velho along the Madeira-Mamoré railroad (= ca. 260 km South-West of Porto Velho), Rondônia, Brazil.

- Brazil
- Peru - first report in 2010.
