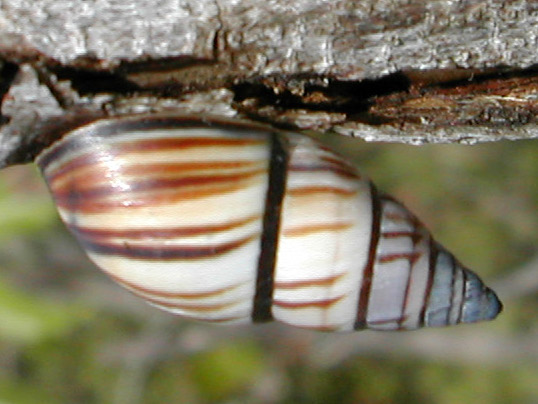
- Mesembrinus multilineatus on a tree branch

Scientific classification
- Kingdom: Animalia
- Phylum: Mollusca
- Class: Gastropoda
- Order: Stylommatophora
- Family: Bulimulidae
- Genus: Mesembrinus; Albers, 1850

Species
- See text

Synonyms
- Buliminus (Mesembrinus) Albers, 1850; Bulimulus (Mesembrinus) Albers, 1850; Bulimus (Mesembrinus) Albers, 1850 (basionym); Drymaeus (Diaphanomormus) Weyrauch, 1964; Drymaeus (Leptodrymaeus) Pilsbry, 1946; Drymaeus (Mesembrinus) Albers, 1850; Drymaeus (Orodrymaeus) Pilsbry, 1926; Mesembrinus (Leptomormus) Weyrauch, 1958

= Mesembrinus =

Genus of gastropods

Mesembrinus is a genus of tropical land snails, terrestrial pulmonate gastropod molluscs in the subfamily Peltellinae of the family Bulimulidae. Mesembrinus was previously considered a subgenus of Drymaeus, but research published in 2023 has elevated the taxon to genus level.

== Species ==
Currently, these species are included in Mesembrinus:

- Mesembrinus acobambensis (Weyrauch, 1967)
- Mesembrinus aestivus (L. Pfeiffer, 1857)
- Mesembrinus alabastrinus (S. I. Da Costa)
- Mesembrinus albostriatus (Strebel, 1882)
- Mesembrinus alsophilus (Philippi, 1867)
- Mesembrinus altenai (Breure, 1976)
- Mesembrinus amandus (L. Pfeiffer, 1855)
- Mesembrinus amoenus (L. Pfeiffer, 1847)
- Mesembrinus anceps (Albers, 1854)
- Mesembrinus angulobasis (Pilsbry, 1944)
- Mesembrinus annulatus (Reeve, 1849)
- Mesembrinus apicepunctatus (Preston, 1914)
- Mesembrinus attenuatus (L. Pfeiffer, 1853)
- Mesembrinus aureolus (Guppy, 1866)
- Mesembrinus aurifluus (L. Pfeiffer, 1857)
- Mesembrinus bahamensis (L. Pfeiffer, 1862)
- Mesembrinus bequaerti (Weyrauch, 1956)
- Mesembrinus binominis (E. A. Smith, 1895)
- Mesembrinus botterii (Crosse & P. Fischer, 1875)
- Mesembrinus broadwayi (E. A. Smith, 1896)
- Mesembrinus bugabensis (E. von Martens, 1893)
- Mesembrinus cactivorus (Broderip, 1832)
- Mesembrinus celendinensis (Weyrauch, 1956)
- Mesembrinus championi (E. von Martens, 1893)
- Mesembrinus chiriquiensis (S. I. Da Costa 1901)
- Mesembrinus chrysomelas (E. von Martens, 1867)
- Mesembrinus clathratus (L. Pfeiffer, 1858)
- Mesembrinus coelestini (F. Haas, 1952)
- Mesembrinus colombianus (I. Lea, 1838)
- Mesembrinus columbiensis (L. Pfeiffer, 1855)
- Mesembrinus combinai (Weyrauch, 1958)
- Mesembrinus conus (Pilsbry, 1902)
- Mesembrinus costaricensis (L. Pfeiffer, 1862)
- Mesembrinus cozumelensis (H. G. Richards, 1937)
- Mesembrinus cuzcoensis (Reeve, 1849)
- Mesembrinus cylindricus (S. I. Da Costa, 1901)
- Mesembrinus depictus (Reeve, 1849)
- Mesembrinus discrepans (G. B. Sowerby I, 1833)
- Mesembrinus dominicus (Reeve, 1850)
- Mesembrinus droueti (L. Pfeiffer, 1857)
- Mesembrinus dubius (L. Pfeiffer, 1853)
- Mesembrinus dutaillyi (L. Pfeiffer, 1857)
- Mesembrinus elongatus (Röding, 1798)
- Mesembrinus emeus (Say, 1829)
- Mesembrinus eucosmetus (F. Haas, 1955)
- Mesembrinus farrisi (L. Pfeiffer, 1858)
- Mesembrinus fasciarum (Pilsbry, 1939)
- Mesembrinus fenestrellus (E. von Martens, 1863)
- Mesembrinus fidustus (Reeve, 1849)
- Mesembrinus flavidulus (E. A. Smith, 1877)
- Mesembrinus flavidus (Menke, 1829)
- Mesembrinus gabbi (Angas, 1879)
- Mesembrinus ghiesbreghti (L. Pfeiffer, 1866)
- Mesembrinus gorgonensis (F. Haas, 1966)
- Mesembrinus granadensis (L. Pfeiffer, 1848)
- Mesembrinus hegewischi (L. Pfeiffer, 1842)
- Mesembrinus hepatostomus (L. Pfeiffer, 1861)
- Mesembrinus heterogeneus (L. Pfeiffer, 1866)
- Mesembrinus hjalmarsoni (L. Pfeiffer, 1856)
- Mesembrinus hondurasanus (L. Pfeiffer, 1846)
- Mesembrinus imperfectus (Guppy, 1866)
- Mesembrinus inconspicuus (F. Haas, 1949)
- Mesembrinus inglorius (Reeve, 1848)
- Mesembrinus insulaecygni (W. F. Clapp, 1914)
- Mesembrinus interpunctus (E. von Martens, 1886)
- Mesembrinus interruptus (Preston, 1909)
- Mesembrinus intrapictus (Pilsbry, 1930)
- Mesembrinus irazuensis (Angas, 1878)
- Mesembrinus iris (Piaget, 1914)
- Mesembrinus jonasi (L. Pfeiffer, 1846)
- Mesembrinus joubini (Germain, 1907)
- Mesembrinus keppelli (L. Pfeiffer, 1854)
- Mesembrinus koppeli (G. B. Sowerby III, 1892)
- Mesembrinus lacteus (I. Lea, 1838)
- Mesembrinus laetus (Reeve, 1849)
- Mesembrinus lamas (E. T. Higgins, 1868)
- Mesembrinus leucomelas (Albers, 1854)
- Mesembrinus libertadensis (Pilsbry, 1898)
- Mesembrinus liliaceus (A. Férussac, 1832)
- Mesembrinus lineolatus (Conrad, 1855)
- Mesembrinus lirinus (Morelet, 1851)
- Mesembrinus livescens (L. Pfeiffer, 1842)
- Mesembrinus lividus (Reeve, 1850)
- Mesembrinus loxanus (E. T. Higgins, 1872)
- Mesembrinus loxensis (L. Pfeiffer, 1846)
- Mesembrinus lusorius (L. Pfeiffer, 1855)
- Mesembrinus lynchi (Parodiz, 1946)
- Mesembrinus manupictus (Reeve, 1848)
- Mesembrinus marmoratus Breure, Mogollón & Vega‑Luz, 2024
- Mesembrinus mayaorum (Rehder, 1966)
- Mesembrinus membranaceus (R. A. Phillipi, 1846)
- Mesembrinus meridanus (L. Pfeiffer, 1846)
- Mesembrinus mexicanus (Lamarck, 1822)
- Mesembrinus miltochrous (Albers, 1854)
- Mesembrinus monilifer (Reeve, 1848)
- Mesembrinus montanus (Pilsbry, 1901)
- Mesembrinus moricandi (L. Pfeiffer, 1847)
- Mesembrinus moritinctus (E. von Martens, 1893)
- Mesembrinus mossi (E. A. Smith, 1896)
- Mesembrinus moussoni (L. Pfeiffer, 1853)
- Mesembrinus muliebris (Reeve, 1849)
- Mesembrinus multilineatus (Say, 1825)
- Mesembrinus necaxanus (Solem, 1955)
- Mesembrinus niceforonis (Pilsbry, 1939)
- Mesembrinus nigroapicatus (L. Pfeiffer, 1857)
- Mesembrinus nigrofasciatus (L. Pfeiffer, 1846)
- Mesembrinus oreades (A. d'Orbigny, 1835)
- Mesembrinus paeteli (Albers, 1854)
- Mesembrinus parvicygni (Pilsbry, 1930)
- Mesembrinus perductorum (Rehder, 1943)
- Mesembrinus pereirai (Parodiz, 1958)
- Mesembrinus pergracilis (Rolle, 1904)
- Mesembrinus pertristis (Pilsbry, 1898)
- Mesembrinus pervariabilis (L. Pfeiffer, 1853)
- Mesembrinus phryne (L. Pfeiffer, 1863)
- Mesembrinus pilsbryi (Zetek, 1933)
- Mesembrinus pluvialis (L. Pfeiffer, 1862)
- Mesembrinus polygrammus (S. Moricand, 1836)
- Mesembrinus ponsonbyi (S. I. da Costa, 1907)
- Mesembrinus praetextus (Reeve, 1849)
- Mesembrinus pseudobesus (Breure, 1979)
- Mesembrinus puellaris (Reeve, 1850)
- Mesembrinus pulcherrimus (H. Adams, 1867)
- Mesembrinus puncticulatus (L. Pfeiffer, 1857)
- Mesembrinus purpuralabrum Breure, Mogollón & Vega‑Luz, 2024
- Mesembrinus rawsoni (Guppy, 1871)
- Mesembrinus recluzianus (L. Pfeiffer, 1847)
- Mesembrinus rosalbus (Pilsbry, 1932)
- Mesembrinus roseatus (Reeve, 1850)
- Mesembrinus rudis (Anton, 1838)
- Mesembrinus rufolineatus (Drouët, 1859)
- Mesembrinus sachsei (Albers, 1854)
- Mesembrinus sallei (Pilsbry, 1899)
- Mesembrinus sargi (Crosse & P. Fischer, 1875)
- Mesembrinus scitulus (Reeve, 1849)
- Mesembrinus semifasciatus (Mousson, 1869)
- Mesembrinus semimaculatus (Pilsbry, 1898)
- Mesembrinus semipellucidus (Tristram, 1861)
- Mesembrinus shattucki (Bequaert & Clench, 1931)
- Mesembrinus silvanus (Zilch, 1953)
- Mesembrinus subpellucidus (E. A. Smith, 1877)
- Mesembrinus sulcosus (L. Pfeiffer, 1841)
- Mesembrinus tenuilabris (L. Pfeiffer, 1866)
- Mesembrinus totonacus (Strebel, 1882)
- Mesembrinus translucens (Broderip, 1832)
- Mesembrinus tribalteatus (Reeve, 1848)
- Mesembrinus trigonostomus (Jonas, 1844)
- Mesembrinus trimarianus (E. von Martens, 1893)
- Mesembrinus tripictus (Albers, 1857)
- Mesembrinus tropicalis (Morelet, 1849)
- Mesembrinus trujillensis (Philippi, 1867)
- Mesembrinus tryoni (Crosse & P. Fischer, 1875)
- Mesembrinus uhdeanus (E. von Martens, 1863)
- Mesembrinus umbraticus (Reeve, 1849)
- Mesembrinus undulatus (Guilding, 1828)
- Mesembrinus vernhouti (Breure, 1976)
- Mesembrinus vespertinus (L. Pfeiffer, 1858)
- Mesembrinus vexillum (W. Wood, 1828)
- Mesembrinus vincentinus (L. Pfeiffer, 1846)
- Mesembrinus virginalis (L. Pfeiffer, 1856)
- Mesembrinus wintlei (S. G. Finch, 1929)
- Mesembrinus ziegleri (L. Pfeiffer, 1847)
- Mesembrinus zilchi (F. Haas, 1955)
