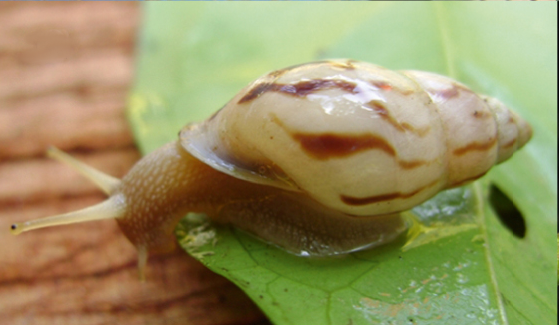
- Drymaeus strigatus from Peru

Scientific classification
- Kingdom: Animalia
- Phylum: Mollusca
- Class: Gastropoda
- Order: Stylommatophora
- Suborder: Helicina
- Superfamily: Orthalicoidea
- Family: Bulimulidae
- Genus: Drymaeus; Albers, 1850

Type species
- Helix hygrohylaea d'Orbigny, 1835

Diversity
- ca. 300 species

Synonyms
- List: Bulimus (Drymaeus) Albers, 1850 (basionym); Bulimulus (Drymaeus) Albers, 1850; Bulimulus (Goniognathmus) Crosse & P. Fischer, 1875; Bulimulus (Liostracus); Bulimulus (Mormus) E. von Martens, 1860; Bulimus (Drymaeus) Albers, 1850; Bulimus (Hamadryas) Albers, 1850; Bulimus (Liostracus); Bulimus (Semiclausaria) L. Pfeiffer, 1856; Drymaeus (Drymaeus) Albers, 1850; Drymaeus (Metadrymaeus) Pilsbry, 1926; Drymaeus (Mormus) E. von Martens, 1860; Hamadryas Albers, 1850; Mesembrinus (Mormus) E. von Martens, 1860; Otostomus (Drymaeus) Albers, 1850; Otostomus (Mormus) E. von Martens, 1860; Peltella J. E. Gray, 1855

= Drymaeus =

Genus of gastropods

Drymaeus is a large genus of medium-sized, air-breathing tropical land snails, terrestrial pulmonate gastropod molluscs belonging to the subfamily Peltellinae within the family Bulimulidae. It is one of the most species-rich genera among Neotropical land mollusks, comprising approximately 300 species distributed from Florida through Central and South America.

== Taxonomy and etymology ==
The name Drymaeus was first introduced by Johann Christian Albers in 1850 as a subgenus of Bulimus Bruguière, 1789. The name stems from the greek word δρῦς (drys), meaning "tree" or "oak", the word drymaeus itself meaning "lives in the woods". The genus continues to be the subject of active taxonomic and evolutionary research. Currently, it is classified within the family Bulimulidae, a group of mostly arboreal snails in the superfamily Orthalicoidea. Historically, classification within Drymaeus has relied heavily on shell morphology, but this approach has proven problematic due to extensive phenotypic plasticity and convergent evolution. As a result, several species were misclassified or synonymized prematurely.

== Distribution and habitat ==
Drymaeus species are primarily distributed throughout the Neotropical region, from Florida and Mexico through Central America and into South America, including the Amazon basin, the Andean foothills, and the Atlantic Forest and other biomes in Brazil and Argentina.

Most species are arboreal or semi-arboreal, favoring moist, shaded environments such as lowland rainforests and cloud forests. They are typically found on leaves, tree trunks, and in leaf litter, where humidity levels are high. Their diet consists mainly of biofilm, algae, and decaying plant material. Many species exhibit narrow ecological tolerances and specialized habitat requirements, making them vulnerable to deforestation and habitat fragmentation. Consequently, numerous species within the genus are likely threatened, although few have been formally assessed due to taxonomic uncertainties.

== Species ==
About 300 species are currently classified under the genus Drymaeus. Due to ongoing taxonomic revisions, the precise number is subject to change; some species previously belonging to Drymaeus have been moved to Antidrymaeus and Mesembrinus. Both were formerly considered subgenera of Drymaeus, but were elevated to genus level to reflect recent research on their evolution and relationships.
