= Kora rupestris =

Scientific classification
- Kingdom: Animalia
- Phylum: Mollusca
- Class: Gastropoda
- Order: Stylommatophora
- Family: Megaspiridae
- Genus: Kora
- Species: K. rupestris

Binomial name
- Kora rupestris Salvador & Simone, 2016

Species of gastropod

Kora rupestris is a species of tropical air-breathing land snails, a pulmonate gastropod mollusc in the family Megaspiridae.

== Distribution ==
Kora rupestris occurs in Carinhanha, Serra do Ramalho and Coribe municipalities, in Bahia, Brazil.
