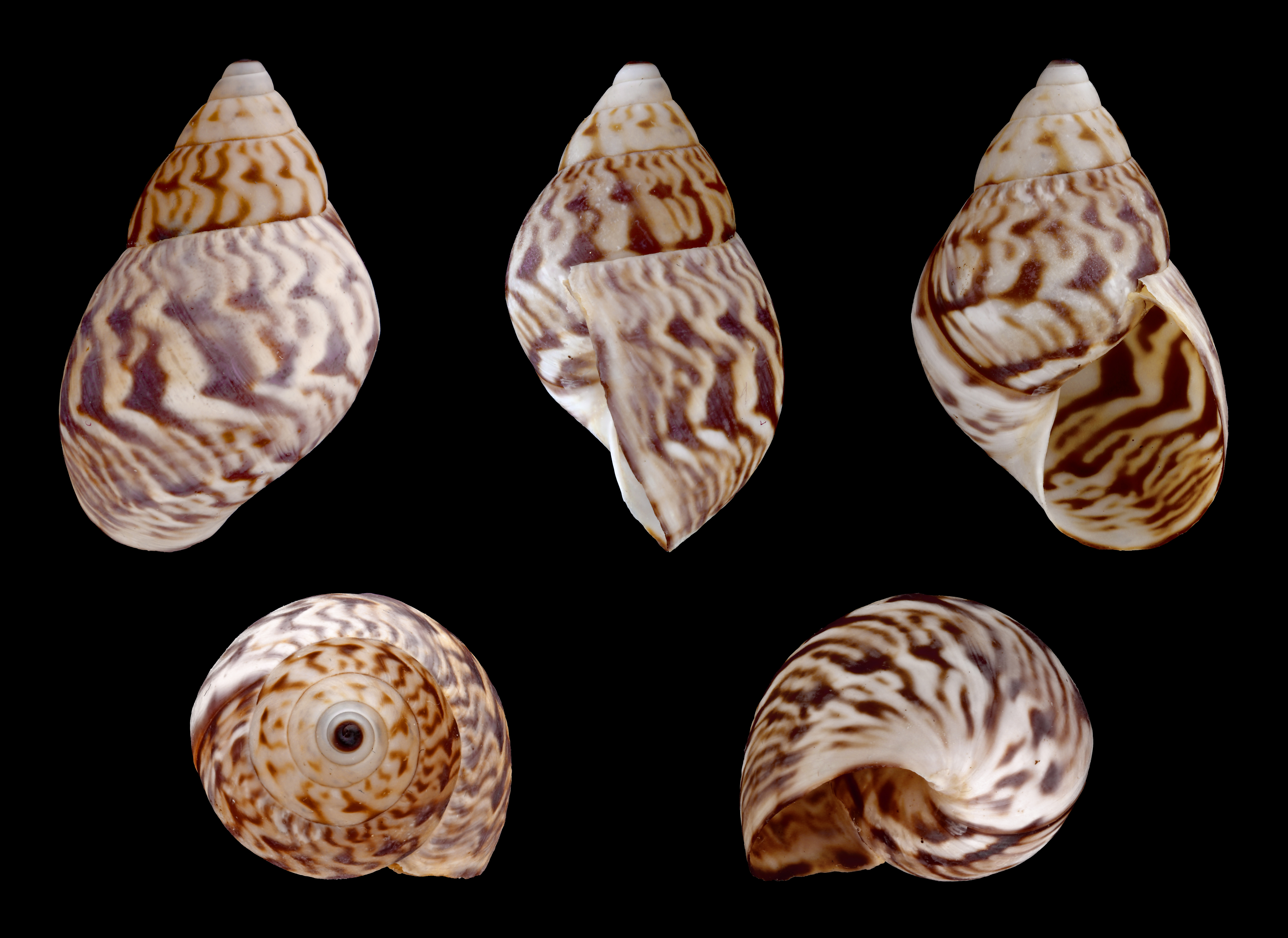
- Orthalicus pulchellus

Scientific classification
- Kingdom: Animalia
- Phylum: Mollusca
- Class: Gastropoda
- Order: Stylommatophora
- Suborder: Helicina
- Superfamily: Orthalicoidea
- Family: Orthalicidae
- Genus: Orthalicus; Beck, 1837

Type species
- Buccinum zebra O. F. Müller, 1774

Synonyms
- Bulimus (Orthalicus) H. Beck, 1837 (original rank); Orthalicus (Zebra) Shuttleworth, 1856 (objective junior synonym); Oxystyla Schlüter, 1838; Zebra Shuttleworth, 1856 (objective junior synonym)

= Orthalicus =

Genus of gastropods

Orthalicus is a genus of land snails in the family Orthalicidae.

== Species ==
Species include:

- Orthalicus bensoni (Reeve, 1849)
- Orthalicus bifulguratus (Reeve, 1849)
- Orthalicus boucardi L. Pfeiffer, 1860
- Orthalicus capax Pilsbry, 1930
- Orthalicus crosseifischeri
- Orthalicus decolor Strebel, 1882
- Orthalicus delphinus (Strebel, 1909)
- Orthalicus elegans Rolle, 1895
- Orthalicus euchrous
- Orthalicus ferussaci E. von Martens, 1863
- Orthalicus fischeri
- Orthalicus floridensis Pilsbry, 1891 – banded treesnail
- Orthalicus gruneri (Strebel, 1909)
- Orthalicus hackeri (Strebel, 1909)
- Orthalicus jamaicensis
- Orthalicus leucochilus Crosse & P. Fischer, 1869
- † Orthalicus linteus (Conrad, 1871)
- Orthalicus livens Shuttleworth, 1856
- Orthalicus lividus E. von Martens, 1863
- Orthalicus longus L. Pfeiffer, 1856
- Orthalicus maclurae E. von Martens, 1893
- Orthalicus maculiferus (Strebel, 1909)
- Orthalicus maracaibensis (L. Pfeiffer, 1856)
- Orthalicus mars L. Pfeiffer, 1861
- Orthalicus melanocheilus (Valenciennes, 1833)
- Orthalicus miles
- Orthalicus muelleri (Strebel, 1909)
- Orthalicus naesiotes
- Orthalicus nobilis Rolle, 1895
- Orthalicus pallidus (Strebel, 1909)
- Orthalicus phlogerus (d'Orbigny, 1835)
- Orthalicus ponderosus Strebel, 1882
- Orthalicus princeps (G.B. Sowerby I, 1833)
- Orthalicus prototypus Pilsbry, 1899
- Orthalicus pseudolongus (Strebel, 1909)
- Orthalicus pulchellus (Spix, 1827)
- Orthalicus quagus (Strebel, 1909)
- Orthalicus reses (Say, 1830) – Stock Island treesnail
- Orthalicus richardsoni (Strebel, 1909)
- Orthalicus selectus (Strebel, 1909)
- Orthalicus sphinx (Strebel, 1909)
- Orthalicus tepicensis (Strebel, 1909)
- Orthalicus torrei (McGinty, 1939)
- Orthalicus turrita
- Orthalicus uhdeanus E. von Martens, 1893
- Orthalicus undatus (Bruguière, 1789)
- Orthalicus varius E. von Martens, 1873
- Orthalicus xanthus
- Orthalicus zonatus (Strebel, 1909)
- Orthalicus zoniferus Strebel, 1882
  - Orthalicus zoniferus crossei (Martens, 1893)

Species inquirendum

- Orthalicus zebra (O. F. Müller, 1774)

Species brought into synonymy

- *Orthalicus isabellinus Martens, 1873: synonym of Orthalicus bensoni (Reeve, 1849) (junior synonym)
- Orthalicus macandrewi G. B. Sowerby III, 1889: synonym of Sultana (Metorthalicus) macandrewi (G. B. Sowerby III, 1889) represented as Sultana macandrewi (G. B. Sowerby III, 1889)
- Orthalicus meobambensis (L. Pfeiffer, 1855): synonym of Sultana meobambensis (L. Pfeiffer, 1855) (superseded combination)
- Orthalicus pfeifferi Hidalgo, 1869: synonym of Corona pfeifferi (Hidalgo, 1869)
- Orthalicus powisianus Petit de la Saussaye, 1843: synonym of Sultana powisiana (Petit de la Saussaye, 1843) (original combination)
- Orthalicus reginaeformis Strebel, 1909: synonym of Corona perversa (Swainson, 1823) (junior synonym)
- Orthalicus sultana (Dillwyn, 1817): synonym of Sultana sultana (Dillwyn, 1817) (unaccepted combination)
- Orthalicus tricinctus E. von Martens, 1893: synonym of Orthalicus ferussaci tricinctus E. von Martens, 1893 (basionym)
- Orthalicus trullisatus Shuttleworth, 1856: synonym of Sultana sultana (Dillwyn, 1817) (junior synonym)
