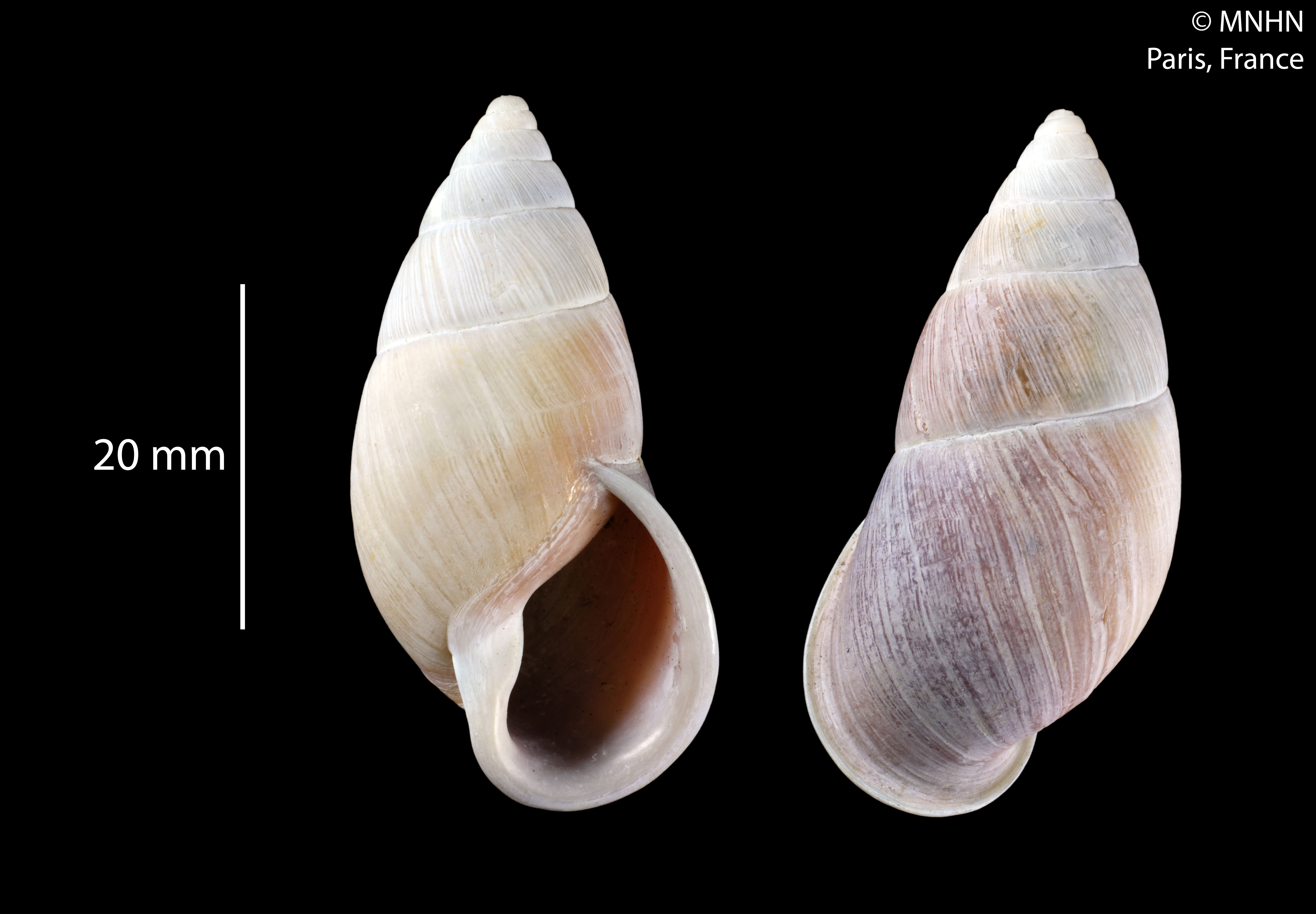
- Shell of Kora corallina (paratype at MNHN, Paris)

Scientific classification
- Kingdom: Animalia
- Phylum: Mollusca
- Class: Gastropoda
- Order: Stylommatophora
- Family: Megaspiridae
- Genus: Kora
- Species: K. corallina

Binomial name
- Kora corallina Simone, 2012

= Kora corallina =

Species of gastropod

Kora corallina is a species of a tropical air-breathing land snail, a pulmonate gastropod mollusc in the family Megaspiridae.

== Taxonomy ==
The scientific name Kora corallina is named in honour of Brazilian poet Cora Coralina. Kora corallina is the type species of the genus Kora. It was originally classified with the family Orthalicidae and it was moved to the family Bulimulidae in 2016.

== Distribution ==
Kora corallina occurs in Santa Maria da Vitória municipality, in Bahia, Brazil.

== Description ==
This land snail occurs in Bahia, Brazil.
