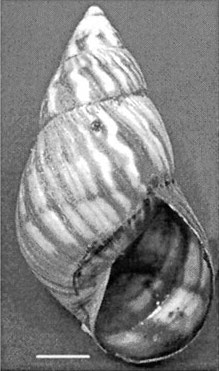
- Black-and-white photo: an apertural view of the shell of Orthalicus undatus jamaicensis from Jamaica. Scale bar is 1 cm.

Scientific classification
- Kingdom: Animalia
- Phylum: Mollusca
- Class: Gastropoda
- Order: Stylommatophora
- Family: Orthalicidae
- Genus: Orthalicus
- Species: O. undatus

Binomial name
- Orthalicus undatus (Bruguière, 1789)

= Orthalicus undatus =

Species of gastropod

Orthalicus undatus is a species of air-breathing land snail, a terrestrial pulmonate gastropod mollusk in the family Orthalicidae.

== Subspecies ==
- Orthalicus undatus jamaicensis (Pilsbry, 1899) - synonym: Orthalicus jamaicensis. This is the only taxon of the genus Orthalicus that has been recorded in Jamaica.
