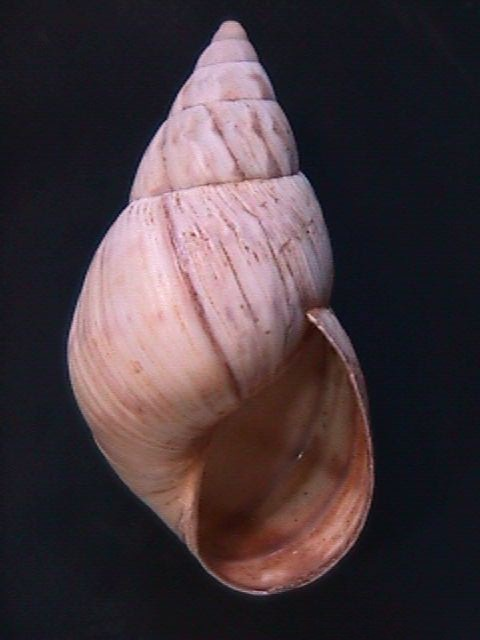
- Apertural view of a shell of Orthalicus maracaibensis

Scientific classification
- Kingdom: Animalia
- Phylum: Mollusca
- Class: Gastropoda
- Order: Stylommatophora
- Family: Orthalicidae
- Genus: Orthalicus
- Species: O. maracaibensis

Binomial name
- Orthalicus maracaibensis (Pfeiffer, 1856)

= Orthalicus maracaibensis =

Species of gastropod

Orthalicus maracaibensis is a species of air-breathing land snail, a terrestrial pulmonate gastropod mollusk in the family Orthalicidae.

== Subspecies ==
- Orthalicus maracaibensis noesiotus - photo of shell

== Distribution ==
- Venezuela
