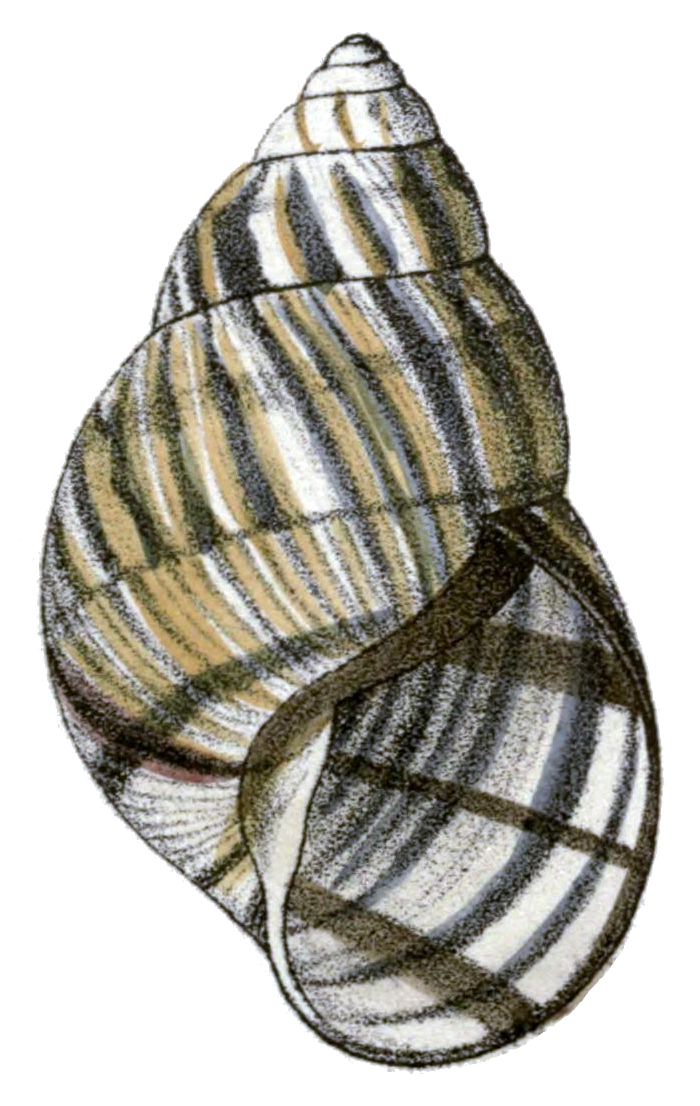
- 1899 drawing, apertural view of a shell of Orthalicus reses reses

Conservation status
- Imperiled (NatureServe)

Scientific classification
- Kingdom: Animalia
- Phylum: Mollusca
- Class: Gastropoda
- Order: Stylommatophora
- Family: Orthalicidae
- Genus: Orthalicus
- Species: O. reses

Binomial name
- Orthalicus reses (Say, 1830)

Synonyms
- Bulimus undatus var. reses Say, 1830; Oxystyla undata var. reses (Say, 1830)

= Orthalicus reses =

Species of gastropod

Orthalicus reses, the Stock Island tree snail or the Florida tree snail, is a species of large tropical air-breathing tree snail, a terrestrial pulmonate gastropod mollusk in the family Orthalicidae. It was first described in 1830 by the American naturalist Thomas Say. The holotype, a specimen probably collected in Key West, was subsequently lost. Over a hundred years later, in 1946, the American biologist Henry Augustus Pilsbry redescribed the species using a specimen from Stock Island, Florida. Orthalicus reses has two subspecies, O. reses reses and O. reses nosodryas. The validity of these two taxa is still being discussed, but some experts argue that considering them as independent units may be important for management purposes.

The Stock Island tree snail has a large conical shell (45–55 mm in length) with variable thickness, generally lighter and more translucent than other species of Orthalicus. It is colored white to buff, with weakly developed spiral bands and several flame-like, purple-brown axial stripes. The subspecies O. reses reses and O. reses nosodryas can be distinguished from one another based on the different color patterns of the apical whorl, columella, and parietal callus.

The nominate subspecies Orthalicus reses reses is threatened; it lives on trees in hardwood hammocks habitat in Southern Florida, USA, specifically the Florida Keys.

== Taxonomy ==
Orthalicus reses is a species within the genus Orthalicus, a group of large, arboreal pulmonate snails in the family Orthalicidae. The genus Orthalicus occurs primarily in Central and South America. Two species occur in North America, Orthalicus reses and Orthalicus floridensis Pilsbry, both of which are restricted to South Florida. The Stock Island tree snail (Orthalicus reses) was first described by Thomas Say in 1830, based on a snail which was probably collected in Key West. That specimen was lost, and the species was later redescribed by Henry Augustus Pilsbry in 1946 using a snail collected from Stock Island.

Orthalicus reses has two subspecies:

- Orthalicus reses reses (Say, 1830) - Stock Island tree snail
- Orthalicus reses nesodryas Pilsbry, 1946 - Florida Keys treesnail

It is generally thought that the two subspecies of Orthalicus reses do not interbreed due to anatomical incompatibility. However, Emmel and Perry (2004) recommended that if the two Orthalicus reses subspecies prove to be as genetically invariant as was observed in their study, the groups should be considered a single taxon or taxonomic unit. In that case, the nominate form, Orthalicus reses reses, would prevail, and Orthalicus reses nesodryas would be demoted to a synonym instead of a valid subspecies. Emmel and Perry (2004) however asserted that the taxa "should continue to be considered as independent units for management purposes".

== Description ==
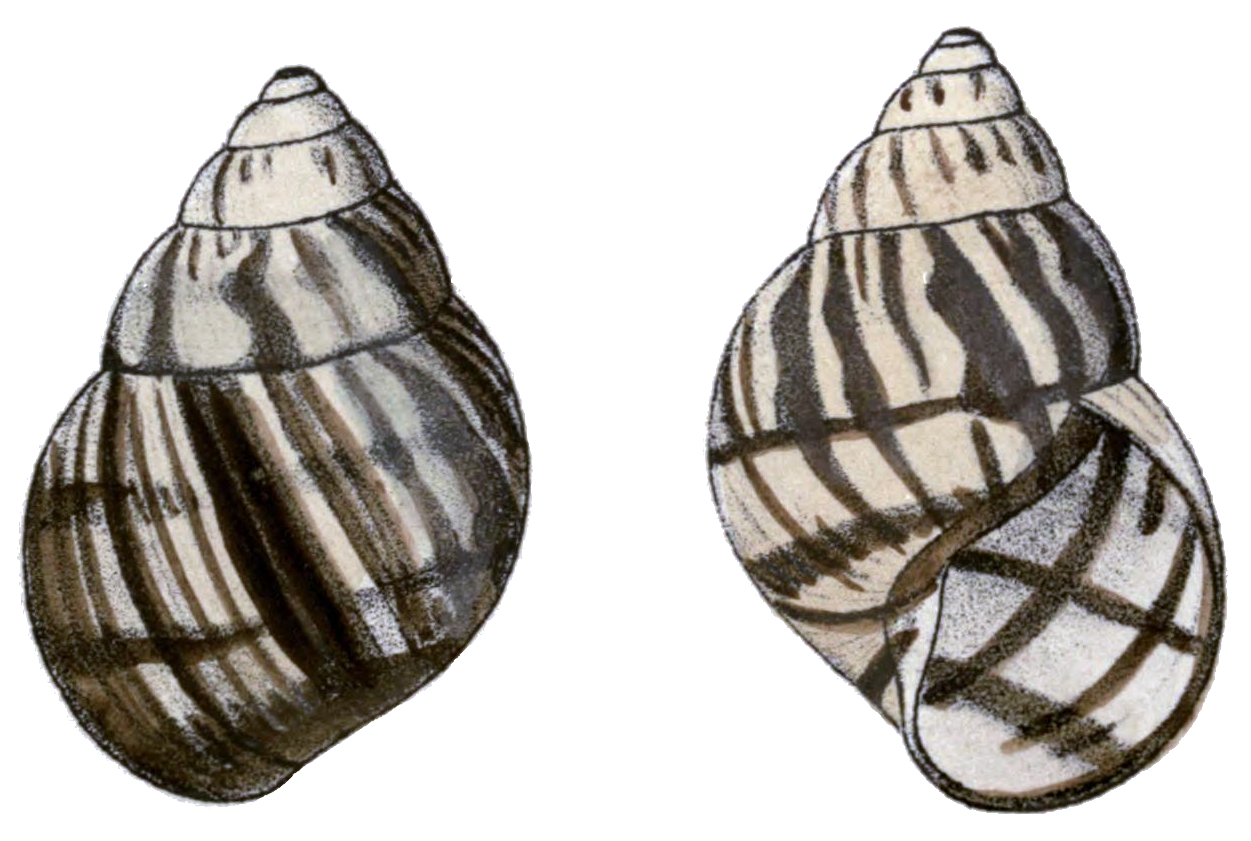
Drawing of abapertural and apertural view of the shell of Orthalicus reses reses.

Orthalicus reses is a snail with a large, conical shell that is approximately 45 to 55 mm in length. The thickness of the shell varies, but is usually more lightweight and translucent than other species of Orthalicus. The external ground color of the shell is white to buff, with three poorly developed spiral bands and several flame-like purple-brown axial stripes that stop at the lower of the spiral bands. The axial stripes are typically narrower than their whitish interspaces and do not fork near the upper suture. There are two to three white apical whorls. The last whorl contains two to four darker brown growth-rest varices. The columella and parietal callus are white or faint chestnut brown.

The nominate subspecies Orthalicus reses reses is distinguished from the supposed subspecies Orthalicus reses nesodryas by the lighter color pattern of the apical whorl, columella, and parietal callus. These characteristics are chestnut-brown or darker in Orthalicus reses nesodryas.

== Distribution ==
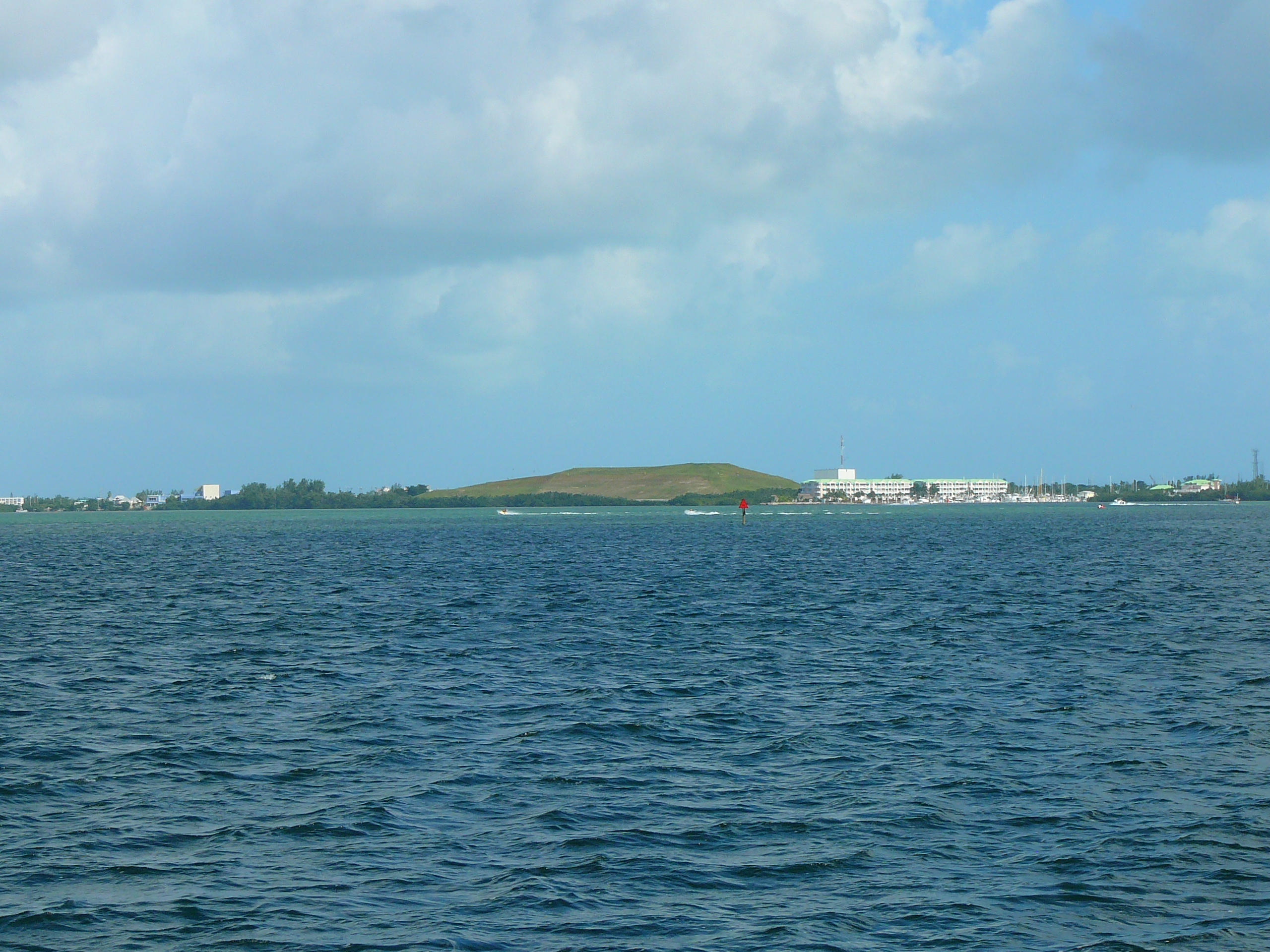
Stock Island, Florida is one of the places in which O. reses is known to occur.

Henry Augustus Pilsbry suggested, in 1946, that Orthalicus reses reses arrived in Florida from Central America and the Caribbean shortly after the emergence of the Florida peninsula in the late Pleistocene. Snails that were sealed in place on floating tropical trees may have been cast ashore on the Florida peninsula by high winds and hurricanes. This form of dispersal has been suggested for both Orthalicus and Liguus, but the exact origin of these species is still in question. In 1972, Craig suggested that populations of Orthalicus arrived directly across the Gulf of Mexico from Central America, but the mode of transportation and whether dispersal occurred as a single event or multiple events was not known. No one knows when Orthalicus reses reses arrived in the Lower Keys.

Historically, the Stock Island tree snail was believed to have a very limited distribution, being found only in tropical hardwood hammocks on Stock Island and Key West; although it may have been found in other hammock areas in the Lower Keys. The distribution has since been artificially extended by collectors, who have introduced them to Key Largo and the southernmost parts of mainland Florida. Orthalicus reses nesodryas has a broader range, occurring throughout the Florida Keys from Sugarloaf Key north. Orthalicus floridensis is the only Orthalicus species to occur naturally on the mainland, and is also found in the Keys. This species is known to occur in the National Key Deer Refuge.

== Behavior ==
Orthalicus reses reses snails are active mainly during the wet season, i.e. May through November, during which time breeding, feeding, and dispersal takes place. Dry periods (December through April) are spent in aestivation, during which time the snail forms a tight sealed barrier between the aperture and a tree trunk or branch. Snails secrete this mucus seal (an epiphragm) that cements their shell to a tree in order to protect them from desiccation during the dry period. Snails may come out of aestivation briefly to feed during dry-season rains, and also may go into aestivation during summer dry spells.

== Ecology ==
=== Habitat ===
Originally, Orthalicus reses occurred exclusively in hardwood hammocks of the Keys. Orthalicus reses survives best in hammocks with smooth-barked native trees that support relatively large amounts of lichens and algae. In the Florida Keys, Orthalicus is limited to the higher portions of the islands that support hammock forests (minimum elevations of 5 to 11 feet).

Lower Keys hammocks consist of thick forests of tropical trees and shrubs which grow in limestone, marl, and calcareous sand soils. Canopy trees include black ironwood (Krugiodendron ferreum), gumbo limbo (Bursera simaruba), Jamaican dogwood (Piscidia piscipula), mahogany (Swietenia mahagoni), pigeon plum (Coccoloba diversifolia), poisonwood (Metopium toxiferum), and strangler fig (Ficus aurea). Hammock understory contains torchwood (Amyris elemifera), milkbark (Drypetes diversifolia), wild coffee (Psychotria nervosa), marlberry (Ardisia escallonioides), stoppers (Eugenia sp.), soldierwood (Colubrina elliptica), crabwood (Gymnanthes lucida), and velvetseed (Guettarda scabra).

Larger trees are more likely to support more Orthalicus reses reses snails than smaller trees, probably because they provide the snails with an increased surface area for foraging. It is not known if Orthalicus reses reses prefer certain tree types or species; however, Voss (1976) suggested tree snails generally prefer trees with smooth bark rather than trees with rough bark, because it would require less energy to crawl over smooth bark. Voss also believed Orthalicus reses reses would prefer smooth bark because it would make it easier for them to form a secure mucous seal when they were aestivating, resulting in lower mortalities from dehydration or accidental dislodgement.

Orthalicus reses reses snails are entirely arboreal except when they move to the forest floor for nesting or traveling. Hammocks that contain well-developed soils or leaf litter are important for nesting activity and dispersal. Essential factors affecting food availability are the light intensity and moisture content of the hammock habitat.

No data are available on minimal hammock size needed to support a viable population of tree snails. Suitable habitat would have to include an area large enough to provide for foraging and nesting requirements, as well as provide for the microclimate (air temperature and humidity) needed by the Orthalicus reses reses. Preferences for edge or interior hammock have been observed in Liguus populations on Lignumvitae Key. Age-class differences were seen where older individuals were found in the central mature hammock, while younger individuals were found more often along the edges of the hammock. Tuskes (1981) suggested this may be an adaptation of younger snails to move to the edge to escape competition from older snails. It is not known whether Orthalicus reses reses prefer interior or edge hammock areas. Recent surveys of snails in the Key Largo populations have shown higher numbers of snails along the edge of the hammock than in the interior, but this result may be affected by the differences in visibility during surveying.

=== Feeding habits ===
Little is known about the feeding habits or food preferences of Orthalicus reses reses. They feed on epiphytic growth on hardwood tree trunks, branches, and leaves. Likely food items include a variety of fungi, algae, and lichens found on many of the native hammock trees. Mixobacteria and some small mites may serve as a secondary food source.

The rate at which individuals of Orthalicus reses reses grow is dependent upon the availability of food, and how quickly their food is replenished after being grazed. Regrowth of the epiphytes is affected by the light intensity and moisture (canopy density and climate) of the hammock habitat.

Feeding can occur at any time during the day or night, with peak feeding activity occurring from late afternoon through the night to mid-morning and during or immediately after rainfall. When they are active, Orthalicus reses reses often follow a random twisting path that covers the entire bark surface, but they will move in a straight line if the surface moisture is abundant.

=== Life cycle ===
Orthalicus reses reses snails are hermaphroditic, and cross-fertilization is common. Liguus individuals are able to locate each other by following mucus trails, and Orthalicus reses reses likely do the same. They mate and nest in late summer and early fall during the wettest part of the rainy season. They lay approximately 15 eggs per clutch in a cavity that is dug into the soil humus layer, usually at the base of a tree, and take anywhere from 24 to 105 hours to deposit their eggs. The presence of this humus layer is essential for egg laying.

The eggs hatch during the onset of the rains the following spring. Upon hatching, the juvenile snails immediately proceed to climb adjacent trees. Most nesting snails appear to be approximately 2 to 3 years old and are estimated to live for up to 6 years, with 2.11 years being the mean age for the Stock Island population at the time of Deisler's study (1987). Tree snail age can be estimated by counting the number of dark "suture-like" lines resulting from pigment deposition during long dry spells (the dry season).

=== Interaction with other snails in the genus ===
Emmel and Perry (2004) believed there to be shifts in the relative abundances of the three Orthalicus taxa in the Keys. In the past, Orthalicus floridensis was the most common and widespread of the three, whereas subsequent to 2000, Emmel and Perry (2004) considered the Orthalicus floridensis to be the rarest. This situation results partly from the translocations that bolstered Orthalicus reses reses distribution and allowed them to avoid extinction, but probably also reflects actual declines in Orthalicus floridensis populations over time. Orthalicus reses reses now occur in sympatry with their congeners in several locations. The observations of Emmel and Perry (2004) suggested that translocated Orthalicus reses reses, all of which are outside the historic range, perform as well or better than congeners in those places where they overlap.

== Population biology ==
The abundance and range of Orthalicus reses reses declined throughout the 20th century. Rigorous estimates of Orthalicus reses reses numbers are not known for any population. Orthalicus reses reses status is currently assessed by the numbers of discrete populations that are known. Accordingly, potential trend information only includes observations of whether various populations continue to persist. However, for most populations, even the area occupied is poorly defined. As of 2006, a tabulation of all well-known and poorly documented sites indicated that Orthalicus reses reses occupied approximately 25 sites in the Florida Keys (Monroe County) and two sites on the mainland (Miami-Dade County).

However, for many of those sites, even confirmation as to whether Orthalicus reses reses persists in recent years is lacking. Survey and monitoring efforts have been limited and highly variable, and methodologies are usually not reported in detail. Whereas Orthalicus reses reses occupies more sites at present than in the recorded past, the total area occupied remains unknown, as are trends in abundance and demographics. Overall, however, the Orthalicus reses reses population status appears to be more secure than when it was listed, due to the widespread translocations that occurred subsequently.

Orthalicus reses reses no longer occupies the Key West Botanical Forest and Garden. In contrast, many populations exist on Key Largo, well beyond Orthalicus reses reses historic range, as a result of relocations by shell collectors. The majority of relocations had occurred by the late 1990s. These were largely carried out by private hobbyists, who sought to thwart extinction. However, these actions were poorly documented, and were subsequently poorly monitored. One clear trend is that Key Largo has accumulated more populations than the Lower Keys.

== Conservation ==
Orthalicus reses reses is listed as threatened on the United States Fish and Wildlife Service list of endangered species, since 2 August 1978. It was originally listed as Orthalicus reses. However, Othalicus reses comprises two recognized taxa, and only Orthalicus reses reses is threatened. In the time of listing, the Florida Game and Fresh Water Fish Commission favored listing, since intensive development has reduced the range to Stock Island. Leslie Hubricht and Alan Solem supported listing. Solem believed that collecting or expansion of tourist facilities could have drastic effects. The primary threat to Orthalicus reses reses at the time of listing was habitat loss due to development. Additional threats include pesticides, hurricanes, vegetation trimming along utility corridors, over-utilization of the habitat areas, and non-native predators. Trends in those threats are continuing at the same level, except for predation, the threat level for which is unknown. The population trend is unknown in 2009.

The recovery criteria largely pertain to habitat, in particular a minimum number of sites (four) and habitat stability for those sites in the Lower Keys. However, only one Lower Keys site is currently occupied by a persistent population, whereas more populations and larger numbers of Orthalicus reses reses occur at various sites in the Upper Keys. In the Lower Keys, the No Name Key population is the only one that persists in natural surroundings and generally appears to be viable. Accordingly, the criteria do not reflect the best available and most up-to-date information on the biology of the species because they treat the Lower Keys as the only area to conduct reintroductions and otherwise achieve recovery for Orthalicus reses reses. Moreover, significant threats in addition to habitat loss have emerged, and these are not adequately addressed in the recovery criteria.
