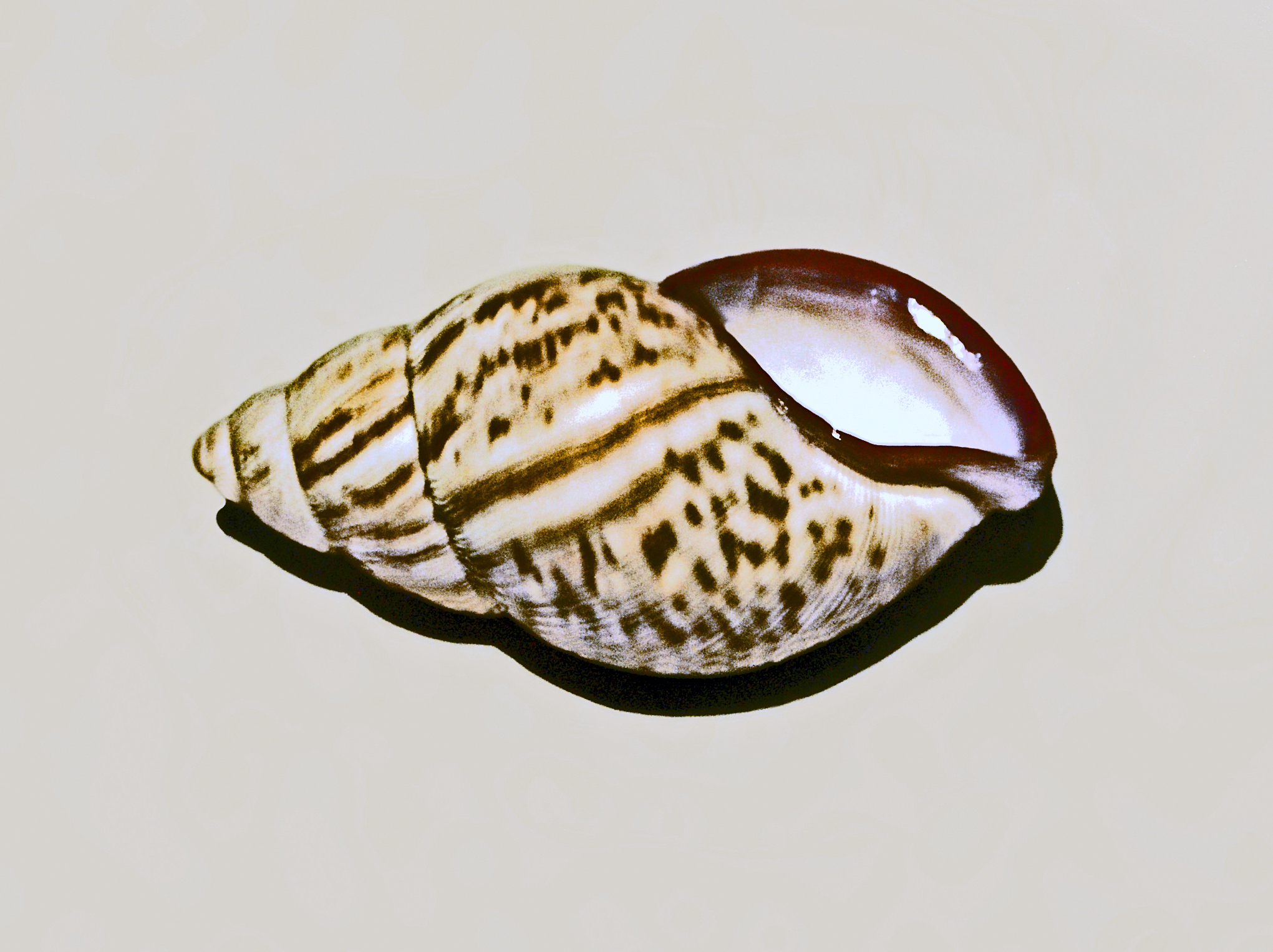
- Shell of Porphyrobaphe iostoma from Ecuador, on display at the Museo Civico di Storia Naturale di Milano

Scientific classification
- Domain: Eukaryota
- Kingdom: Animalia
- Phylum: Mollusca
- Class: Gastropoda
- Order: Stylommatophora
- Family: Orthalicidae
- Genus: Porphyrobaphe
- Species: P. iostoma

Binomial name
- Porphyrobaphe iostoma Sowerby, 1824

= Porphyrobaphe iostoma =

Species of gastropod

Porphyrobaphe iostoma is a species of land snail, a terrestrial pulmonate gastropod mollusk in the family Orthalicidae.

== Description ==
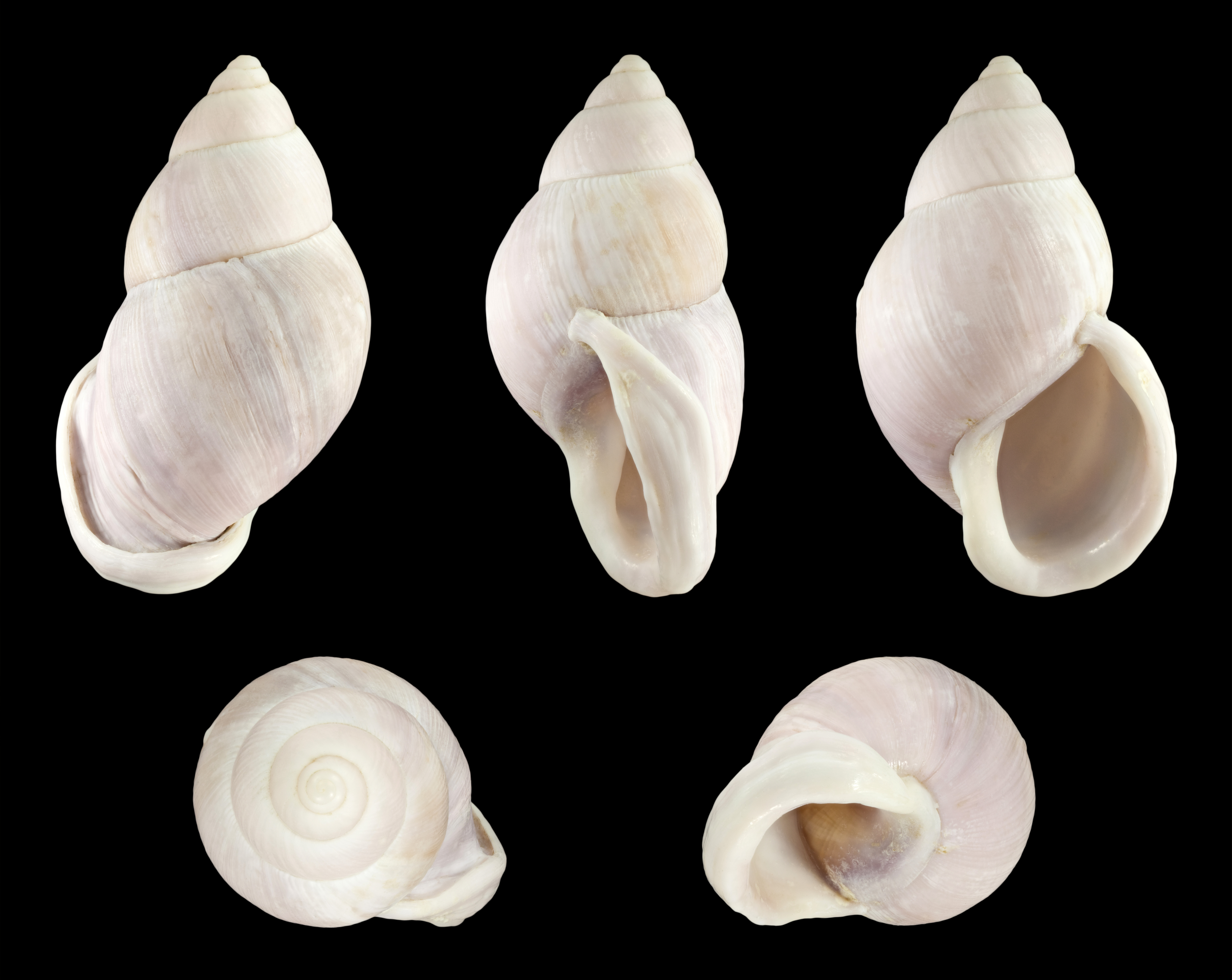
Porphyrobaphe iostoma bilabratus Pilsbry, 1899

Shells of Porphyrobaphe iostoma can reach a length of 62–72 millimetres (2.4–2.8 in).

== Distribution ==
This species is found in Ecuador.
