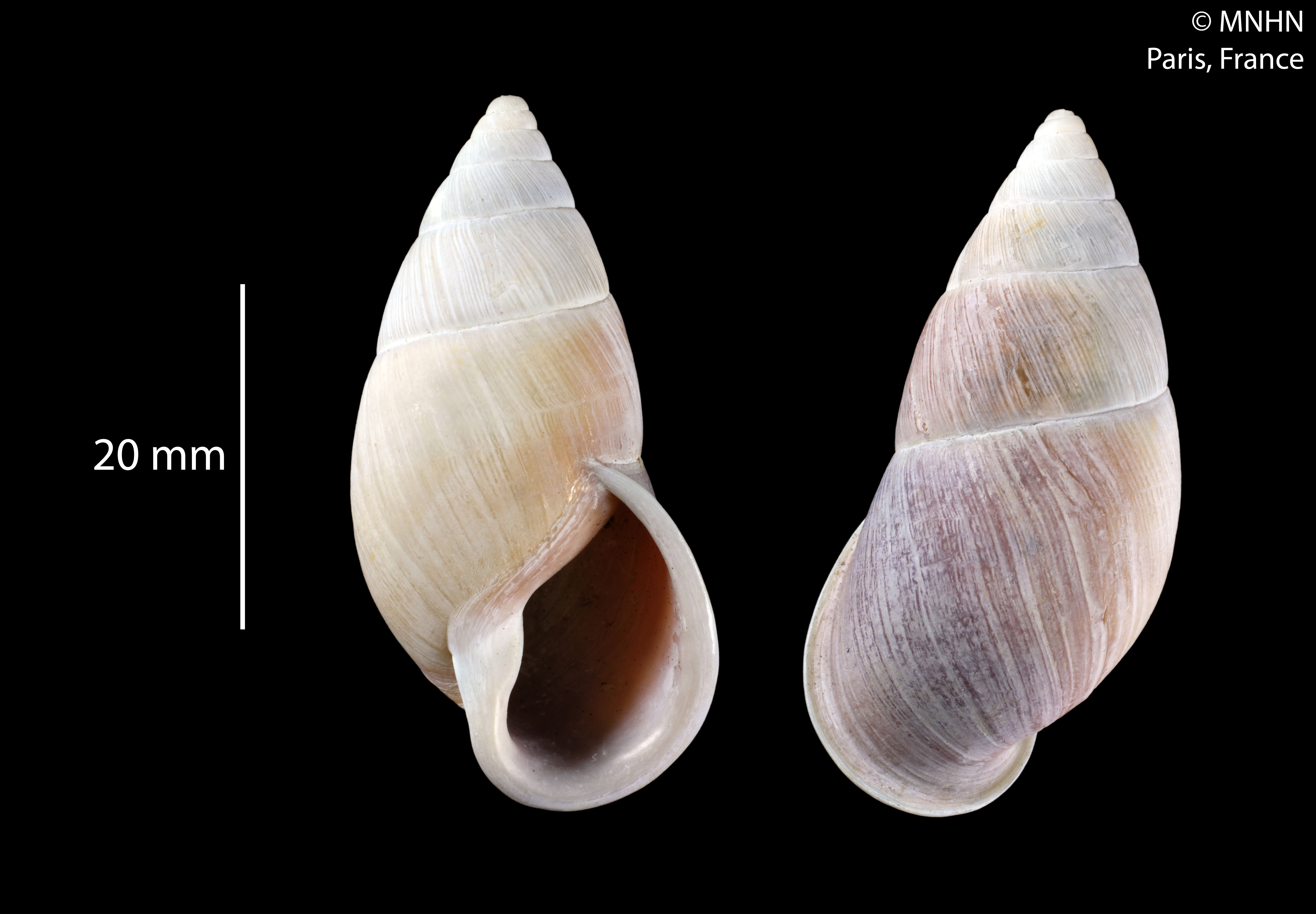
- Shell of Kora corallina (paratype at MNHN, Paris)

Scientific classification
- Kingdom: Animalia
- Phylum: Mollusca
- Class: Gastropoda
- Order: Stylommatophora
- Suborder: Helicina
- Superfamily: Orthalicoidea
- Family: Megaspiridae
- Genus: Kora; Simone, 2012

Type species
- Kora corallina Simone, 2012

= Kora (gastropod) =

Genus of gastropods

Kora is a genus of tropical air-breathing land snails, a pulmonate gastropod mollusks in the family Megaspiridae.

== Distribution ==
Kora is endemic to endemic central-eastern Brazil.

== Taxonomy ==
The generic name Kora is a contraction of a Latin word Corona, that means "crown", because the aperture resemble the crown. The first letter is changed from C to K, because the generic name Cora is preoccupied as a genus of damselflies.

The genus was described with one species Kora corallina classified in the family Orthalicidae in 2012. Later there were added three newly described species to the genus Kora in 2015. There was added another new species to the genus Kora in 2016, while two species were moved to the genus Drymaeus, resulting in three species currently classified within the genus Kora. Kora was also moved from family Orthalicidae to Bulimulidae in 2016.

== Species ==
Species within the genus Kora include:

- Kora corallina Simone, 2012 - the type species of the genus Kora
- Kora nigra Simone, 2015
- Kora rupestris Salvador & Simone, 2016

Synonyms

- Kora iracema Simone, 2015 is a synonym of Drymaeus iracema (Simone, 2015)
- Kora terrea Simone, 2015 is a synonym of Drymaeus terreus (Simone, 2015)
