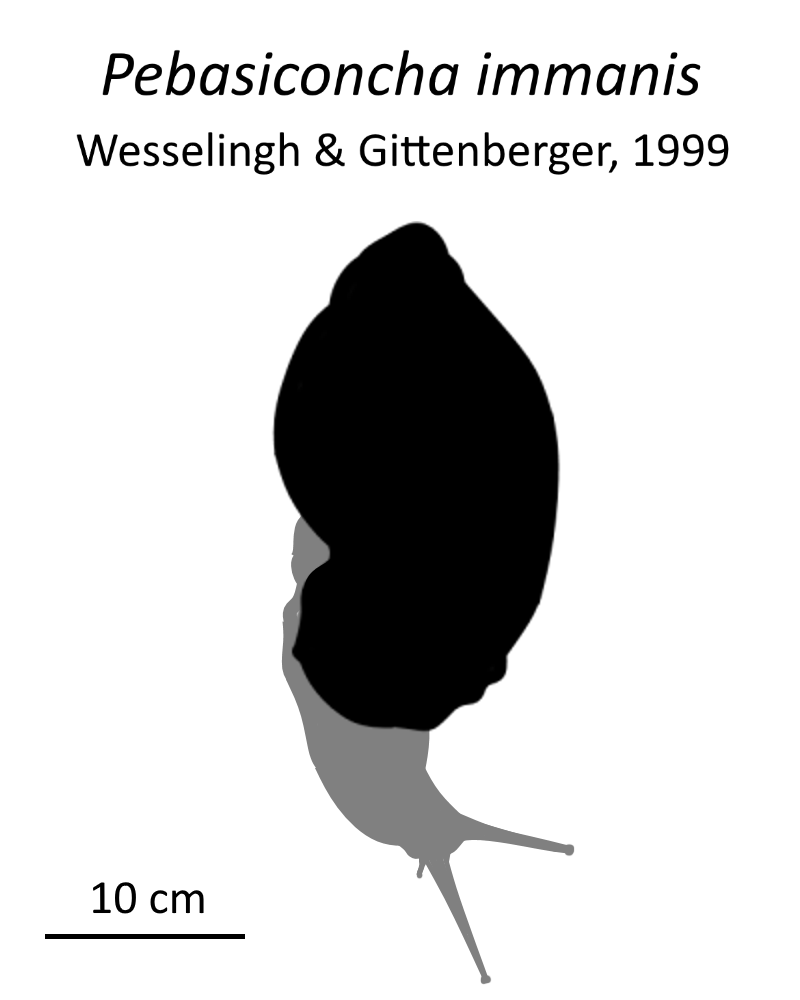
- Pebasiconcha immanis

Scientific classification
- Kingdom: Animalia
- Phylum: Mollusca
- Class: Gastropoda
- Order: Stylommatophora
- Family: Acavidae
- Genus: †Pebasiconcha; Wesselingh & Gittenberger, 1999
- Species: †P. immanis

Binomial name
- †Pebasiconcha immanis Wesselingh & Gittenberger, 1999

Synonyms
- Amazoniconcha immanis

= Pebasiconcha =

Pebasiconcha Temporal range: late Early Miocene - early Late Miocene

Extinct genus of gastropods

Pebasiconcha immanis is an extinct species of air-breathing land snail, a terrestrial pulmonate gastropod mollusc in the family Acavidae. The type locality of Pebasiconcha immanis is the Miocene Pebas Formation in the Colombian and Peruvian Amazonia. It is the only species in the genus Pebasiconcha.

== Discovery and naming ==
Initially believed to belong to the genus Strophocheilus by Spix (1827), Pebasiconcha is a common fossil shell from western Amazonia. Fieldwork in the autumn of 1991 recovered several exceptionally large specimens, however working conditions of the time did not allow the safe transport of entire specimens, which were subsequently broken and disintegrated. However researchers did manage to take photographs of the complete specimens in situ. Later expeditions also failed to produce intact specimens, with the second visit in 1996 only recovering further shell fragments. During this visit researchers also discovered another well preserved specimen in a shop in Iquitos, Peru, which was however not for sale. While unable to purchase the fossil, photos could be taken. Due to this the description of Pebasiconcha was based on photographs and shell fragments.

The generic name is derived from the Pebas Formation where the fossils have been found and the Latin word "concha" meaning shell. The species name immanis, meaning huge or enormous, was chosen to reflect the animals massive size.

== Description ==
The height of the shell is more than 25 cm (more than 250 mm) making Pebasiconcha one of the largest known land snails. The shell is ovoid in shape with up to six moderately convex whorls. The body whorl has a markedly constricted aperture and a prominent asymmetrical knob on the upper half of the body whorl.The border of the outer lip is neither reflected nor thickened. One specimen with a particularly large mytoid knob may indicate a specimen which either possessed a shell higher than 30 cm or simply a proportionally larger knob than the holotype specimen.

== Paleoenvironment ==
Pebasiconcha lived in the Pebas Mega-Wetlands that covered large parts of northern South America during the middle Miocene period, an environment known for its rich freshwater mollusc fauna. The Mega-Wetland included swamps, marshes, embayments, rivers and forested riverbanks. The terrestrial areas of the wetlands were inhabited by a minimum of two land snails, Pebasiconcha and Orthalicus linteus. While the later most likely inhabited the tree trunks and branches as its extant relatives, Pebasiconcha is hypothesized to have lived in the humid bottom layers.
