= Thaumastus crenellus =

Scientific classification
- Kingdom: Animalia
- Phylum: Mollusca
- Class: Gastropoda
- Order: Stylommatophora
- Family: Megaspiridae
- Genus: Thaumastus
- Species: T. crenellus

Binomial name
- Thaumastus crenellus (Philippi, 1867)

Synonyms
- Strophocheilus (Microborus) tenuis Haas, 1955

Species of gastropod

Thaumastus crenellus is a species of tropical air-breathing land snail, a pulmonate gastropod mollusk in the family Megaspiridae.

== Distribution ==
- Peru
