= Cora Coralina =

Brazilian writer and poet

- Born: August 20, 1889; Goiás Velho, Empire of Brazil
- Died: April 10, 1985 (aged 95); Goiânia, Brazil
- Occupations: Poet, prose writer, educator

Cora Coralina (Portuguese pronunciation: [ˈkɔɾɐ kɔɾaˈlĩnɐ]) is the pseudonym of the Brazilian writer and poet Ana Lins dos Guimarães Peixoto Bretas (Portuguese pronunciation: [ˈɐ̃nɐ lĩz duz ɡimaˈɾɐ̃js pejˈʃotu ˈbɾetɐs]) (August 20, 1889 – April 10, 1985). She is considered one of the most important Brazilian writers, Her first book (Poemas d0s Becos de Goiás e Estórias Mais) was published in June 1965.

She spent her working life as a confectioner in a small bakery, and where she drew upon her experiences of rural Brazilian culture to create her rich poetic prose, often featuring the Brazilian countryside, and in particular focusing upon life of the citizens who lived in the small towns across the state of Goiás.

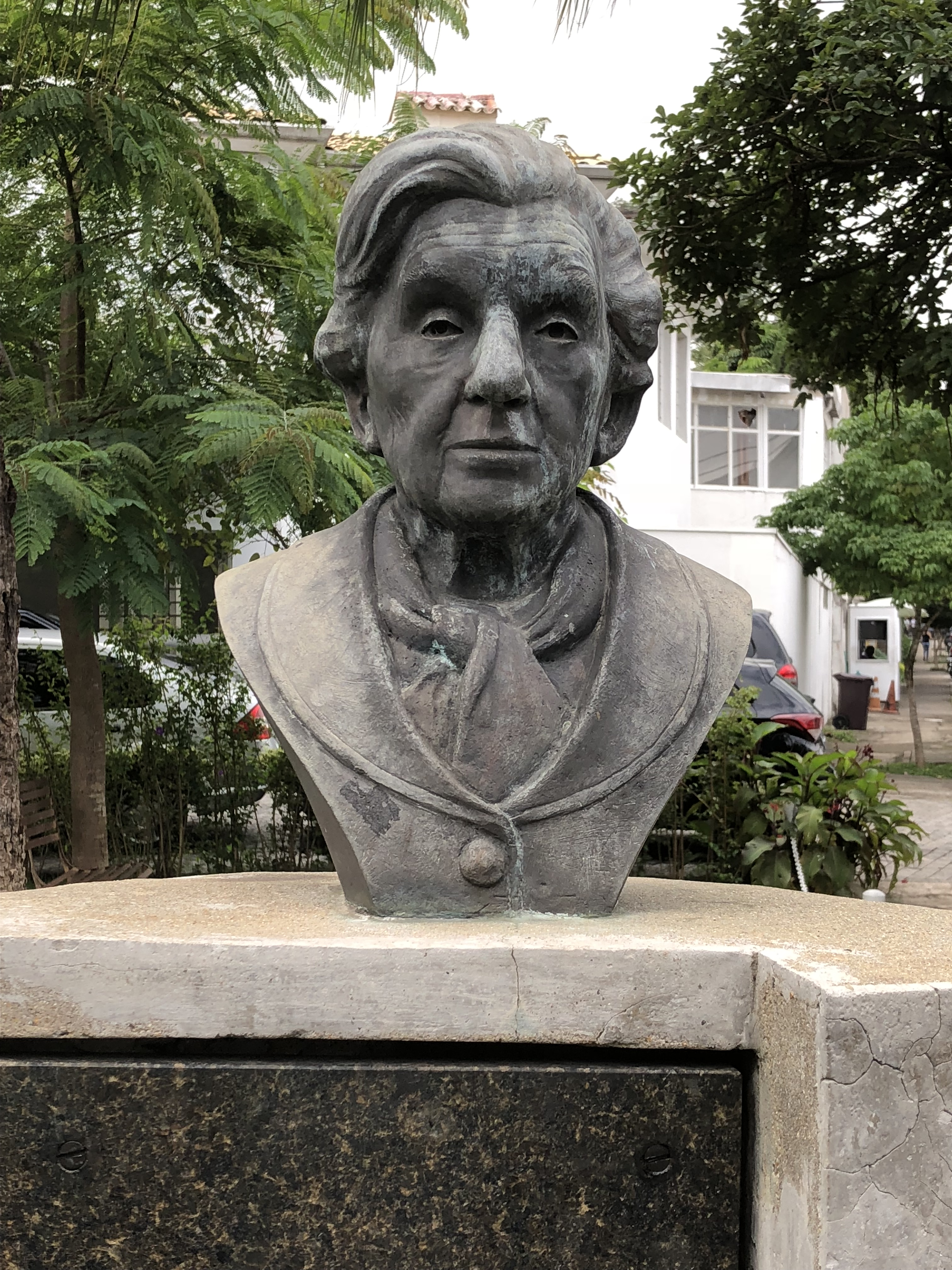
Monumento de cora coralina

== Biography ==
Anna Lins dos Guimarães Peixoto Bretas wrote under the pseudonym of Cora Coralina. She was born on August 20, 1889, in the city of Goiás and raised on the banks of the River Assunção, and maintained a strong connection to the city throughout her life. She was the daughter of Francisco de Paula Lins dos Guimarães Peixoto, a prominent local desembargador (appellate judge) appointed by Dom Pedro II, and Jacyntha Luiza do Couto Brandão. Cora first began to write poems in her early teenage years at around 14, and later attended the Clube Literário Goiano of Dona Virgínia da Luz Vieira.

Cora then married, and went to live in São Paulo, where she raised six children. In addition to running her busy family life, Cora also worked in a small bakery as confectioner specializing in cakes. Her work and family consumed much of her time, but she continued to write; however it would not be until the mid-1960s, following the death of her husband when she was 75 years old, that she came to publish these works, the first of which would be 'Poemas dos Becos de Goiás e Estórias Mais'. After her husband's death, she also dedicated her time to agricultural activities on a small estate in the interior of the state.

Her most well-known publications are Poemas dos becos de Goías e estorias mais and Estorias da Casa Velha da Ponte. She is especially well known for her writing on women's issues, life in the state of Goiás, the poverty of Northeastern Brazilians, and the mythology of Afro-Brazilian rituals that many still practiced. Her poetry integrates many of the diverse cultures of Brazil. Her contemporaries include Argentine writer Alfonsina Storni, Uruguayan writer Juana de Ibarbourou, and Chilean poet Gabriela Mistral. Almost all of her books have had more than ten editions, and have continued to be reprinted in the years since her death, and a number of posthumous volumes of her collected writings and personal stories have been published.

In 1984, the Brazilian Union of Writers named her the "literary personality of the year." At the time, Carlos Drummond de Andrade, a distinguished poet in Brazil well known in Latin America, said: "I admire Cora Coralina and her mastery of living in a state of grace with her poetry. Her verse is like running waters, her lyricism has the power and delicacy of the natural world."

Cora Coralina's family house, where she lived in her childhood and her later years until her death in 1985, can be visited in the city of Goiás. It is located by the bridge over the Vermelho River. It is one of the earliest last buildings of Goiás, and a typical 18th-century house; it inspired some of the most beautiful of her poems. There is a small museum in the house to honour her.

== Tributes ==
Two Brazilian animal species, Kora corallina Simone, 2012 (a land snail) and Ischnopelta coralinae Rosso & Campos, 2021 (a shield bug) are named in her honour.

On August 20, 2017, Google celebrated her 128th birthday with a Google Doodle.

== Example ==
=== Aninha and Her Stones ===
Don't let yourself be destroyed ...
Gathering new stones
and building new poems.
Recreate your life, always, always.
Remove stones and plant roses and make sweets. Restart.
Make your mean life
a poem.
And you will live in the hearts of young people
and in the memory of the generations to come.
This fountain is for use by all thirsty people.
Take your share.
Come to these pages
and do not hinder its use
to those who are thirsty.

== Books ==
In chronological order, the works of Cora Coralina:

- Poemas dos Becos de Goiás e estórias mais (Poetry), 1965 (Editora José Olympio).
- Meu Livro de Cordel, (Poetry), 1976
- Vintém de Cobre - Meias confissões de Aninha (Poetry), 1983
- Estórias da Casa Velha da Ponte (Anthology of Short Stories), 1985
- Meninos Verdes (Children's Literature), 1986 (Posthumous)
- Tesouro da Casa Velha (Poetry), 1996 (Posthumous)
- A Moeda de Ouro que o Pato Engoliu (Children's Literature), 1999 (Posthumous)
- Vila Boa de Goias (Poetry), 2001 (Posthumous)
- O Prato Azul-Pombinho (Children's Literature), 2002 (Posthumous)

== Sources ==
- Clóvis Carvalho Britto, Rita Elisa Seda, Cora Coralina – Raízes de Aninha, Editora Idéias & Letras, 2011;
- Darcy França Denófrio, Cora Coralina – Coleção Melhores Poemas – Global Editora, 2004;
- Darcy França Denófrio, Goiandira Ortiz de Camargo, Cora Coralina: Celebração da Volta, Cânone Editorial, 2006;
- Vicência Bretas Tahan, Cora Coragem, Cora Poesia, Global Editora, 1989;
- Vicência Bretas Tahan, Villa Boa de Goyaz, Global Editora, 2001.
