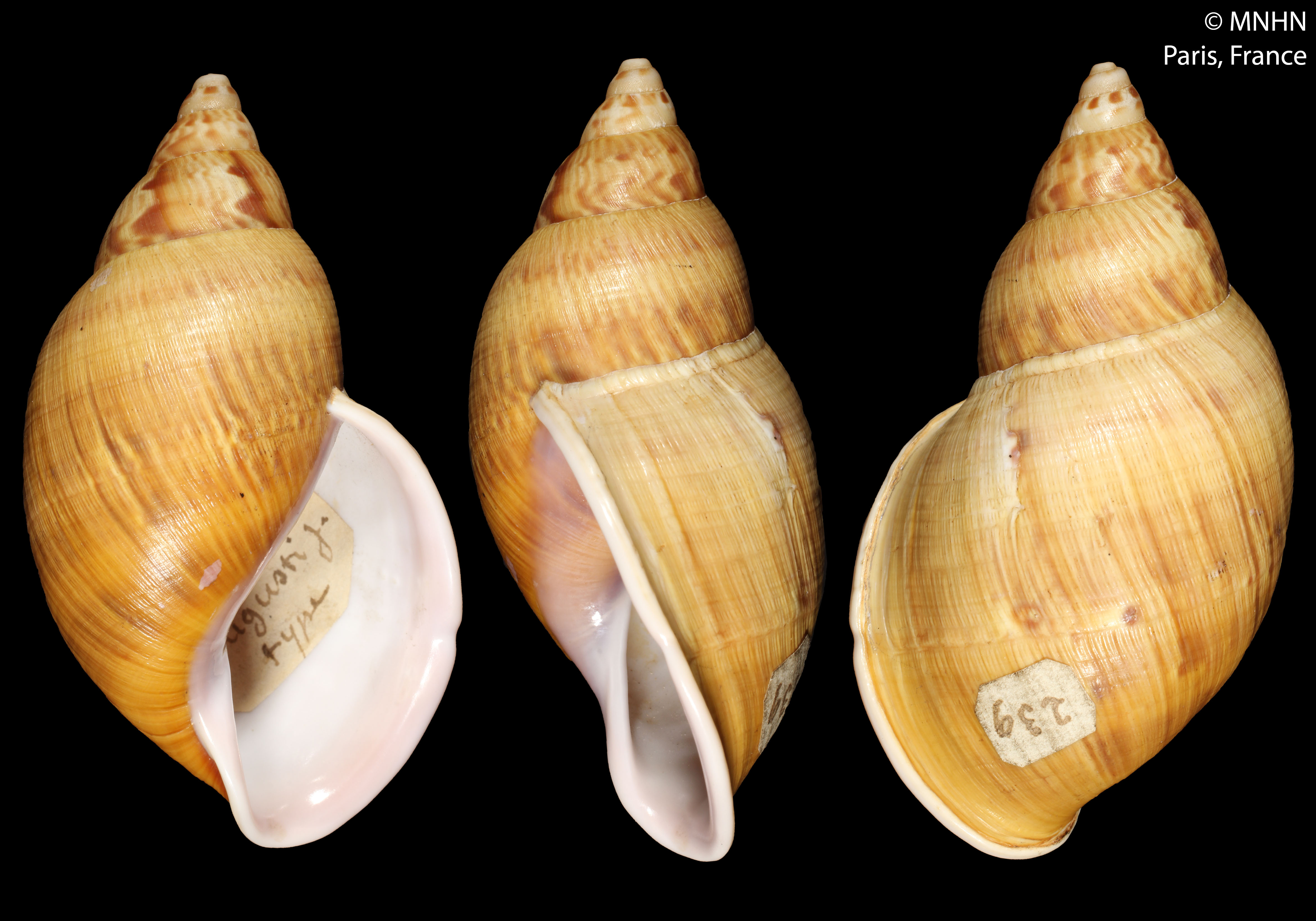
- Shell of Porphyrobaphe augusti (holotype at MNHN, Paris)

Scientific classification
- Kingdom: Animalia
- Phylum: Mollusca
- Class: Gastropoda
- Order: Stylommatophora
- Suborder: Helicina
- Superfamily: Orthalicoidea
- Family: Orthalicidae
- Genus: Porphyrobaphe; Shuttleworth, 1856

Type species
- Bulimus iostoma G. B. Sowerby I, 1824

Synonyms
- Orthalicus (Porphyrobaphe) Shuttleworth, 1856 (unaccepted subgeneric assignment); Porphyrobaphe (Oxyorthalicus) Strebel, 1909· accepted, alternate representation; Porphyrobaphe (Porphyrobaphe) Shuttleworth, 1856· accepted, alternate representation

= Porphyrobaphe =

Genus of gastropods

Porphyrobaphe is a genus of land snails in the family Orthalicidae.

== Species ==
Species in the genus Porphyrobaphe:

- Porphyrobaphe approximata Fulton, 1896
- Porphyrobaphe augusti Jousseaume, 1887
- Porphyrobaphe iostoma Sowerby, 1824
- Porphyrobaphe iris Pfeiffer, 1852
- Porphyrobaphe irrorata L. A. Reeve, 1849
- Porphyrobaphe saturnus (L. Pfeiffer, 1860)
- Porphyrobaphe subirroratus (Da Costa, 1898)

Synonyms

- Porphyrobaphe dennisoni (Reeve, 1848): synonym of Hemibulimus dennisoni (Reeve, 1848) (superseded combination)
- Porphyrobaphe galactostoma Ancey, 1890: synonym of Sultana yatesi galactostomus (Ancey, 1890) (original combination)
- Porphyrobaphe grandis Rolle, 1902: synonym of Sultana yatesi yatesi (L. Pfeiffer, 1855) (junior synonym)
- Porphyrobaphe latevittata Shuttleworth, 1856: synonym of Sultana yatesi yatesi (L. Pfeiffer, 1855) (junior synonym)
- Porphyrobaphe sarcostoma Ancey, 1903: synonym of Sultana yatesi yatesi (L. Pfeiffer, 1855) (junior synonym)
- Porphyrobaphe sublabeo Ancey, 1890: synonym of Sultana yatesi yatesi (L. Pfeiffer, 1855) (junior synonym)
- Porphyrobaphe vicaria Fulton, 1896: synonym of Sultana yatesi vicaria (Fulton, 1896) (original name)
- Porphyrobaphe victor (L. Pfeiffer, 1854): synonym of Clathrorthalicus victor (L. Pfeiffer, 1854) (unaccepted combination)
