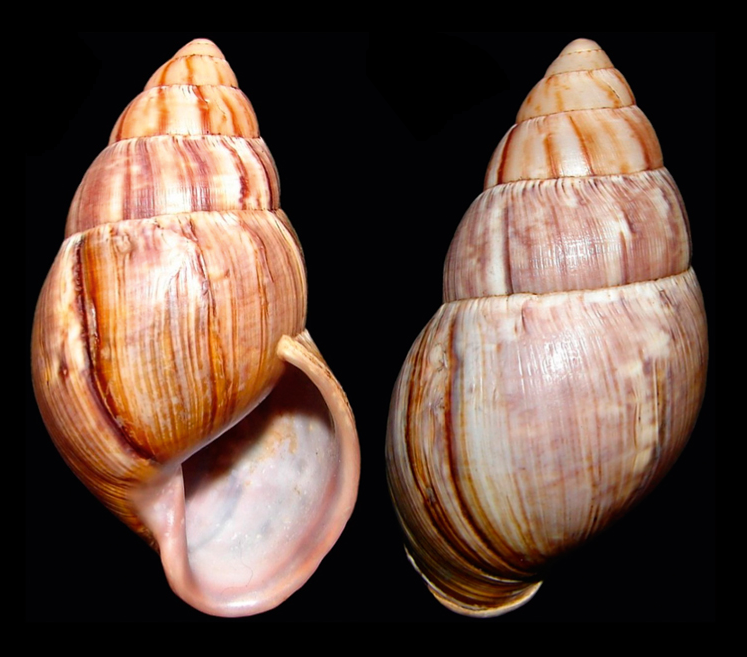
- Apertural and abapertural views of a shell of Thaumastus flori

Scientific classification
- Kingdom: Animalia
- Phylum: Mollusca
- Class: Gastropoda
- Order: Stylommatophora
- Suborder: Helicina
- Superfamily: Orthalicoidea
- Family: Megaspiridae
- Genus: Thaumastus; Albers, 1860

Type species
- Bulimus hartwegi L. Pfeiffer, 1846

Synonyms
- Atahualpa Strebel, 1910; Bulimulus (Thaumastus) E. von Martens, 1860 (original rank); Bulimus (Orphnus) Albers, 1850 (invalid: junior homonym of Orphnus McLeay, 1819; Orphaicus is a replacement name); Bulimus (Orphus) (misspelling); Bulimus (Thaumastus) E. von Martens, 1860 (now: synonym of full genus); Orphnus Albers, 1850; Orphaicus Schaufuss, 1869; Pachytholus Strebel, 1909; Strophocheilus (Thaumastus) E. von Martens, 1860 (now: synonym of full genus); Tatutor Jousseaume, 1887; Thaumastus (Atahualpa) (junior synonymy); Thaumastus (Thaumastiella) Weyrauch, 1956· accepted, alternate representation; Thaumastus (Thaumastus) E. von Martens, 1860· accepted, alternate representation; Tholus Strebel, 1909

= Thaumastus (gastropod) =

Genus of gastropods

Thaumastus is a genus of tropical air-breathing land snails, terrestrial pulmonate gastropod molluscs in the family Megaspiridae.

== Distribution ==
The distribution of the genus Thaumastus includes Colombia, Peru, Ecuador, ...

== Species ==
Species within the genus Thaumastus include:

- Thaumastus ascendens (L. Pfeiffer, 1853)
- Thaumastus blanfordianus (Ancey, 1903)
- Thaumastus buckleyi (Higgins, 1872)
- Thaumastus contortuplicatus (Reeve, 1850)
- Thaumastus crenellus (Philippi, 1867)
- Thaumastus dukinfieldi (Melvill, 1900)
- Thaumastus flori (Jousseaume, 1897)
- Thaumastus foveolatus (Reeve, 1849)
- Thaumastus glyptocephalus (Pilsbry, 1897)
- Thaumastus granocinctus (Pilsbry, 1901)
- Thaumastus hartwegi (Pfeiffer, 1846) – type species of the genus Thaumastus
- Thaumastus hebes Strebel, 1910
- Thaumastus hyalinus (J. A. Wagner, 1827)
- Thaumastus inca (d'Orbigny, 1835)
- Thaumastus indentatus (Da Costa, 1901)
- Thaumastus insolitus (Preston, 1909)
- Thaumastus integer (Pfeiffer, 1855)
- Thaumastus largillierti (Philippi, 1845)
- Thaumastus loxostomus (Pfeiffer, 1853)
- Thaumastus magnificus (Grateloup, 1840)
- Thaumastus melanocheilus (Nyst, 1845)
- Thaumastus nehringi (E. von Martens, 1889)
- Thaumastus occidentalis Weyrauch, 1960
- Thaumastus orcesi Weyrauch, 1967
- Thaumastus orobaenus (d'Orbigny, 1835)
- † Thaumastus patagonicus Parodiz, 1946
- Thaumastus plumbeus (L. Pfeiffer, 1855)
- Thaumastus requieni (L. Pfeiffer, 1853)
- Thaumastus robertsi Pilsbry, 1932
- Thaumastus sangoae (Tschudi, 1852)
- Thaumastus sarcochrous (Pilsbry, 1897) – type species of the subgenus Thaumastiella
- Thaumastus straubei Colley, 2012
- Thaumastus sumaqwayqu Breure & Mogollón, 2016
- Thaumastus tatutor (Jousseaume, 1887)
- Thaumastus taunaisii (Férussac, 1822)

== Synonyms ==
- Thaumastus alausiensis Cousin, 1887: synonym of Bostryx alausiensis (Cousin, 1887)
- Thaumastus brunneus Strebel, 1910: synonym of Thaumastus inca (d'Orbigny, 1835) (junior synonymy)
- Thaumastus cadwaladeri Pilsbry, 1930: synonym of Kara cadwaladeri (Pilsbry, 1930) (original combination)
- Thaumastus jelskii (Lubomirski, 1880): synonym of Scholvienia jelskii (Lubomirski, 1880)
- Thaumastus juana Cousin, 1887: synonym of Bostryx juana (Cousin, 1887) (original combination)
- † Thaumastus limnaeiformis (Meek & Hayden, 1857): synonym of † Lioplacodes limneaformis (Meek & Hayden, 1856) (incorrect subsequent spelling; new combination)
- Thaumastus nystianus (L. Pfeiffer, 1853): synonym of Drymaeus nystianus (L. Pfeiffer, 1853) (unaccepted > superseded combination)
- Thaumastus spixii (J. A. Wagner, 1827): synonym of Thaumastus hyalinus (J. A. Wagner, 1827) (combination based on a mix-up of original names )
- Thaumastus thompsonoides Oberwimmer, 1931: synonym of Kara thompsonii (L. Pfeiffer, 1845) (junior subjective synonym)
- Thaumastus weyrauch Pilsbry, 1944: synonym of Scholvienia weyrauchi (Pilsbry, 1944) (incorrect original spelling)
- Subgenus Thaumastus (Atahualpa) : synonym of Thaumastus E. von Martens, 1860 (junior synonymy)
- Subgenus Thaumastus (Kara) Strebel, 1910: synonym of Kara Strebel, 1910
- Subgenus Thaumastus (Quechua) Strebel, 1910: synonym ofs Quechua Strebel, 1910 (unaccepted rank)
- Subgenus Thaumastus (Scholvienia) Strebel, 1910: elevated to rank of genus Scholvienia Strebel, 1910
- Thaumastus bitaeniatus (Nyst, 1845) – synonym: Bulimus bitaeniatus Nyst, 1845 – type species of the subgenus Scholvienia
- Thaumastus jaspideus (Morelet, 1863)
- Subgenus Thaumastus (Thaumastiella) Weyrauch, 1956: synonym of Thaumastus E. von Martens, 1860
- Subgenus Thaumastus (Thaumastus) E. von Martens, 1860: synonym of Thaumastus E. von Martens, 1860
- Subgenus Paeniscutalus Wurtz, 1947: elevated to the rank of genus Paeniscutalus Wurtz, 1947

== See also ==
- Kara was a subgenus of Thaumastus and Kara was elevated to its genus level in 2011.
