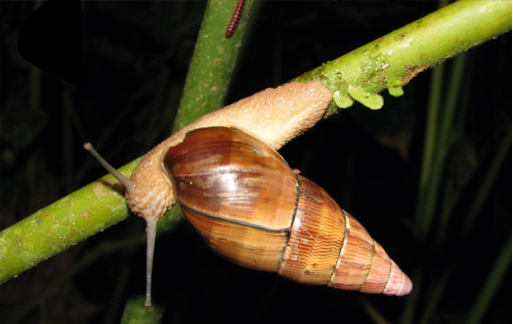
- Corona pfeifferi

Scientific classification
- Kingdom: Animalia
- Phylum: Mollusca
- Class: Gastropoda
- Order: Stylommatophora
- Family: Orthalicidae
- Genus: Corona; Albers, 1850

Synonyms
- Achatina (Corona) Albers, 1850 (original rank); Laeorthalicus Strebel, 1909 (junior synonym); Melaniorthalicus Strebel, 1909; Myiorthalicus Strebel, 1909; Orthalicus (Laeorthalicus) Strebel, 1909 ·; Paraliguus Pilsbry, 1899 (established conditionnally as a substitute name for Corona Albers, 1850, if found to be junior homonym) ·

= Corona (gastropod) =

Genus of gastropods

Corona is a genus of air-breathing land snails, terrestrial pulmonate gastropod mollusks in the family Orthalicidae.

Snails in this genus are restricted in range to central and northern South America. These snails have medium to large elongated shells.

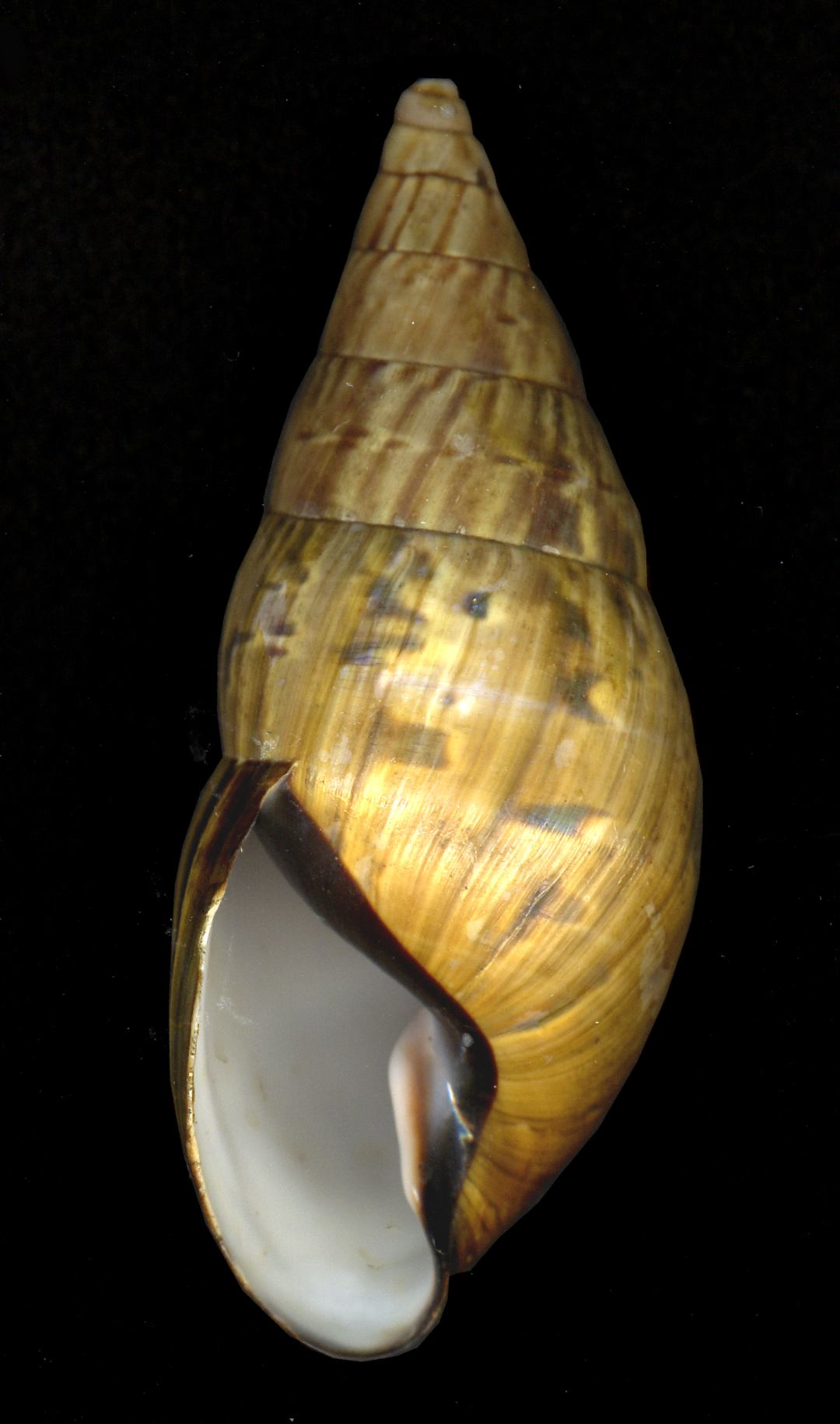
The shell of Corona perversa, a left-handed or sinistral species

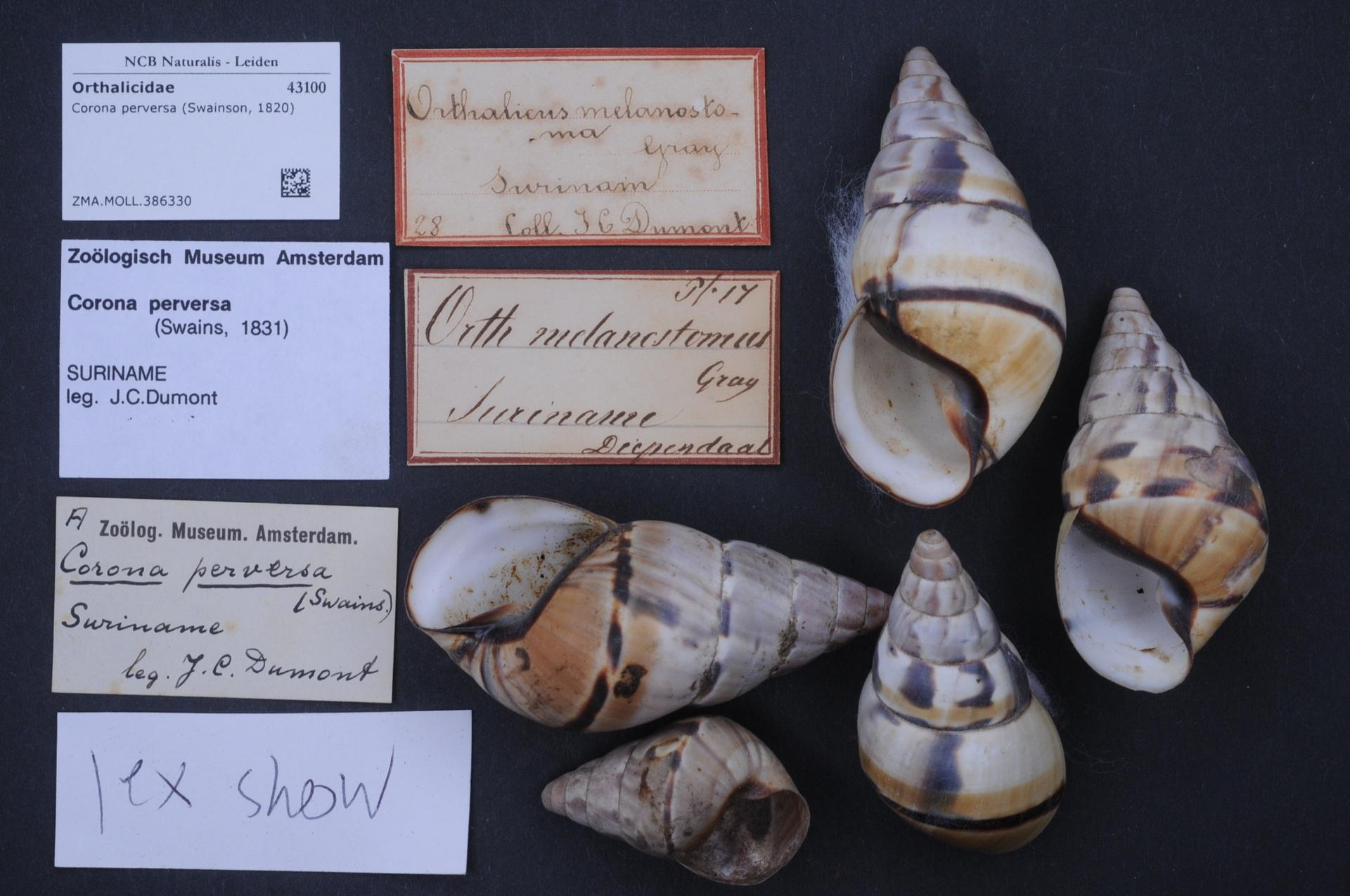
Corona perversa (Swainson, 1820), museum specimen

== Species ==
Species within the genus Corona include:

- Corona atramentarius (Pfeiffer, 1855)
- Corona duckei Ihering, 1915
- Corona incisa (Hupé, 1857) (synonym: Bulimus incisus Hupé, 1857)
- Corona loroisiana (Hupé, 1857)
- Corona perversa (Swainson, 1820)
- Corona pfeifferi (Hidalgo, 1869)
- Corona regalis (Hupé, 1857)
- Corona regina (Férussac, 1821)
- Corona regius (Férussac)
- Corona ribeiroi Ihering, 1915
- Corona rosenbergi Strebel, 1909
