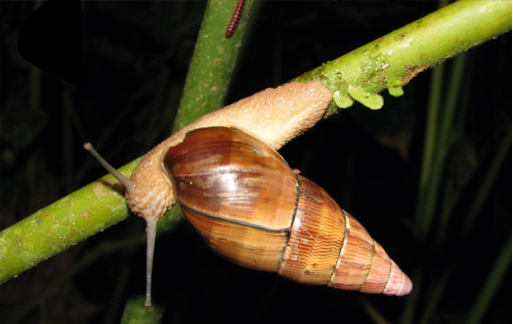
- Corona pfeifferi

Scientific classification
- Kingdom: Animalia
- Phylum: Mollusca
- Class: Gastropoda
- Order: Stylommatophora
- Family: Orthalicidae
- Genus: Corona
- Species: C. pfeifferi

Binomial name
- Corona pfeifferi (Hidalgo, 1869)

Synonyms
- Orthalicus pfeifferi Hidalgo, 1869

= Corona pfeifferi =

Species of gastropod

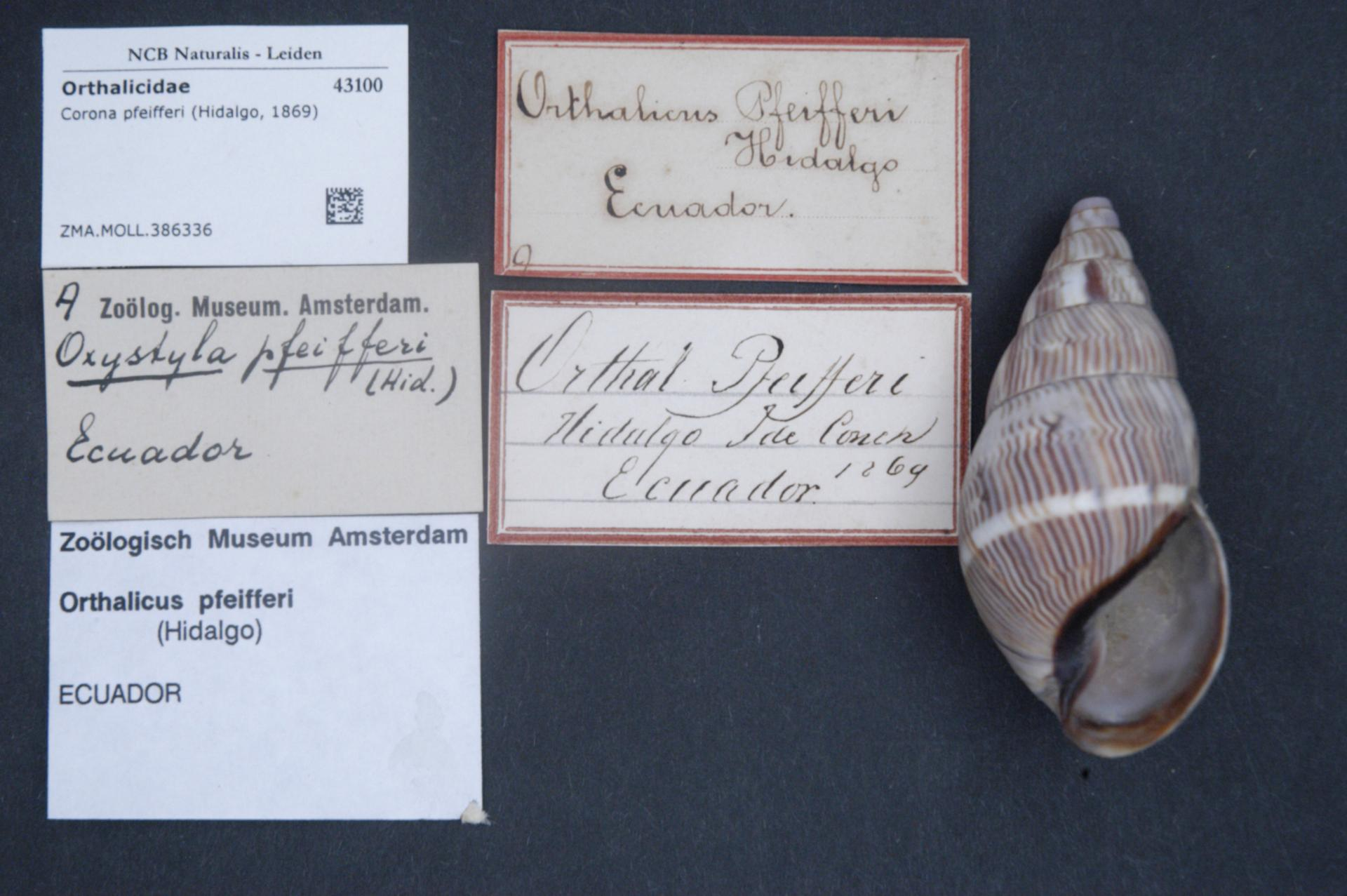
Corona pfeifferi (Hidalgo, 1869), museum specimen

Corona pfeifferi is a species of air-breathing land snail, a terrestrial pulmonate gastropod mollusk in the family Orthalicidae.

== Distribution ==
The distribution of Corona pfeifferi includes:

- Ecuador. It was described from Pastaza Province, Canelos. It was known only from Ecuador until the species was found in Peru in 2010.
- Peru - since 2010

== Description ==
The living animal of Corona pfeifferi has coarse, orange tubercles on a whitish skin. The tentacles are greyish, with a blue hue near the tips.

The shell has 8 whorls.

The height of the shell of the type specimen is 59 mm. The width of the shell of the type specimen is 26 mm. The height of the aperture of the type specimen is 25 mm.

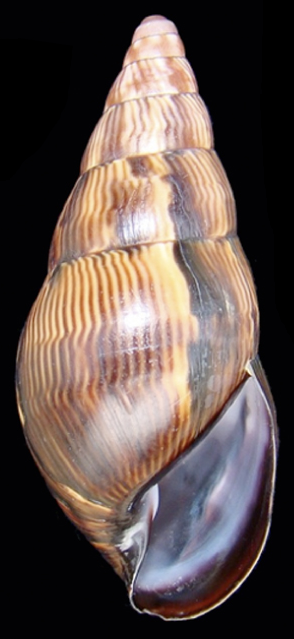
apertural view

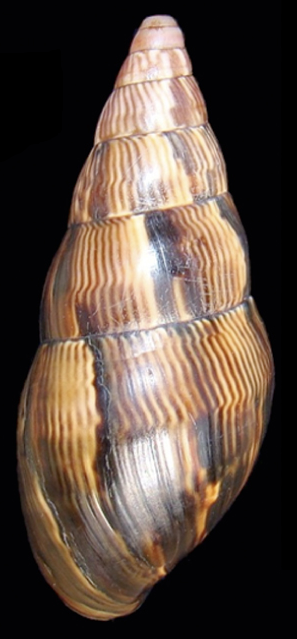
abapertural view

Reproductive system: The penis is proximally slender and subcylindrical, constricted at the base; median part is swollen, pear-shaped, tapering towards the distal part which is subcylindrical again. Transition to the epiphallus with a kink, thereafter gradually tapering; twisted. Vas deferens is adhering to and partially inside the penial complex. Flagellum has ca. 1/5 the total length of the penial complex. Internal structure of penial complex is with longitudinal folds in proximal part of penis, changing into a dense tubular network and a widened lumen in the distal part of the penis. The epiphallus has 3-4 longitudinal folds proximally, transversing into anatosmosing folds more distally. In the specimen dissected, a chitinous spermatophore was being formed with the shape of flagellum and epiphallus, its initial stage inside the flagellum and extending to the distal part of the penis.

ventral overview of reproductive system

dorsal view of penial complex

half-schematic longitudinal section of penial complex
