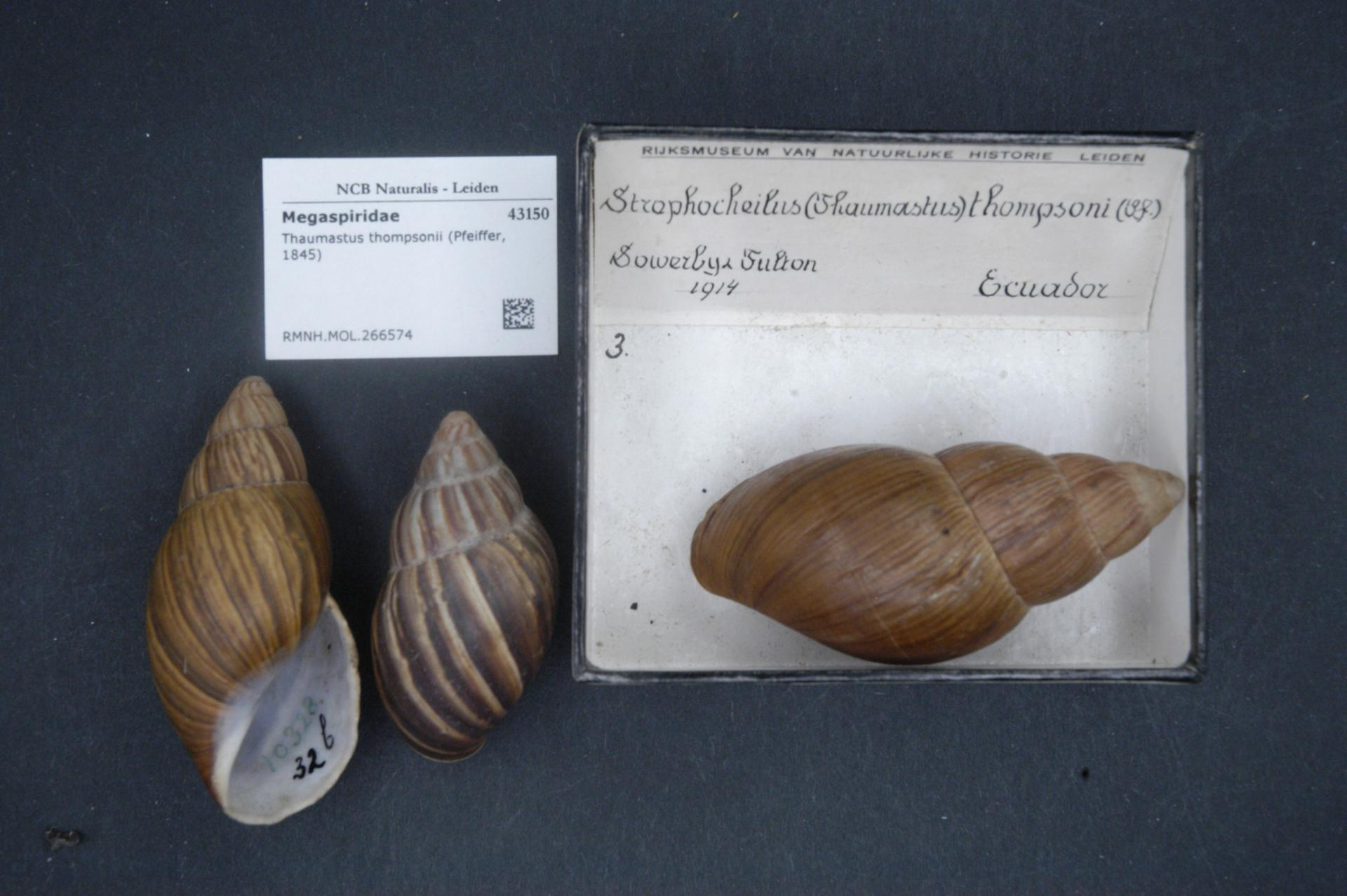
- Shell of Kara thompsonii (specimen at Naturalis Biodiversity Center)

Scientific classification
- Kingdom: Animalia
- Phylum: Mollusca
- Class: Gastropoda
- Order: Stylommatophora
- Family: Orthalicidae
- Genus: Kara; Strebel, 1910

Type species
- Bulimus thompsonii L. Pfeiffer, 1845

Synonyms
- Thaumastus (Kara) Strebel, 1910

= Kara (gastropod) =

Genus of gastropods

Kara is a genus of air-breathing land snails, terrestrial pulmonate gastropod mollusks in the family Orthalicidae.

Kara was previously a subgenus of Thaumastus; it was elevated to genus level in 2011.

== Species ==
Species within the genus Kara include:

- Kara cadwaladeri (Pilsbry, 1930)
- Kara indentata (da Costa, 1901)
- Kara ortiziana (F. Haas, 1955)
- Kara thompsonii (Pfeiffer, 1845) - type species of the (sub)genus Kara
- Thaumastus thompsonoides Oberwimmer, 1931
- Kara viriata (Morelet, 1863)
- Kara yanamensis (Morelet, 1863)
