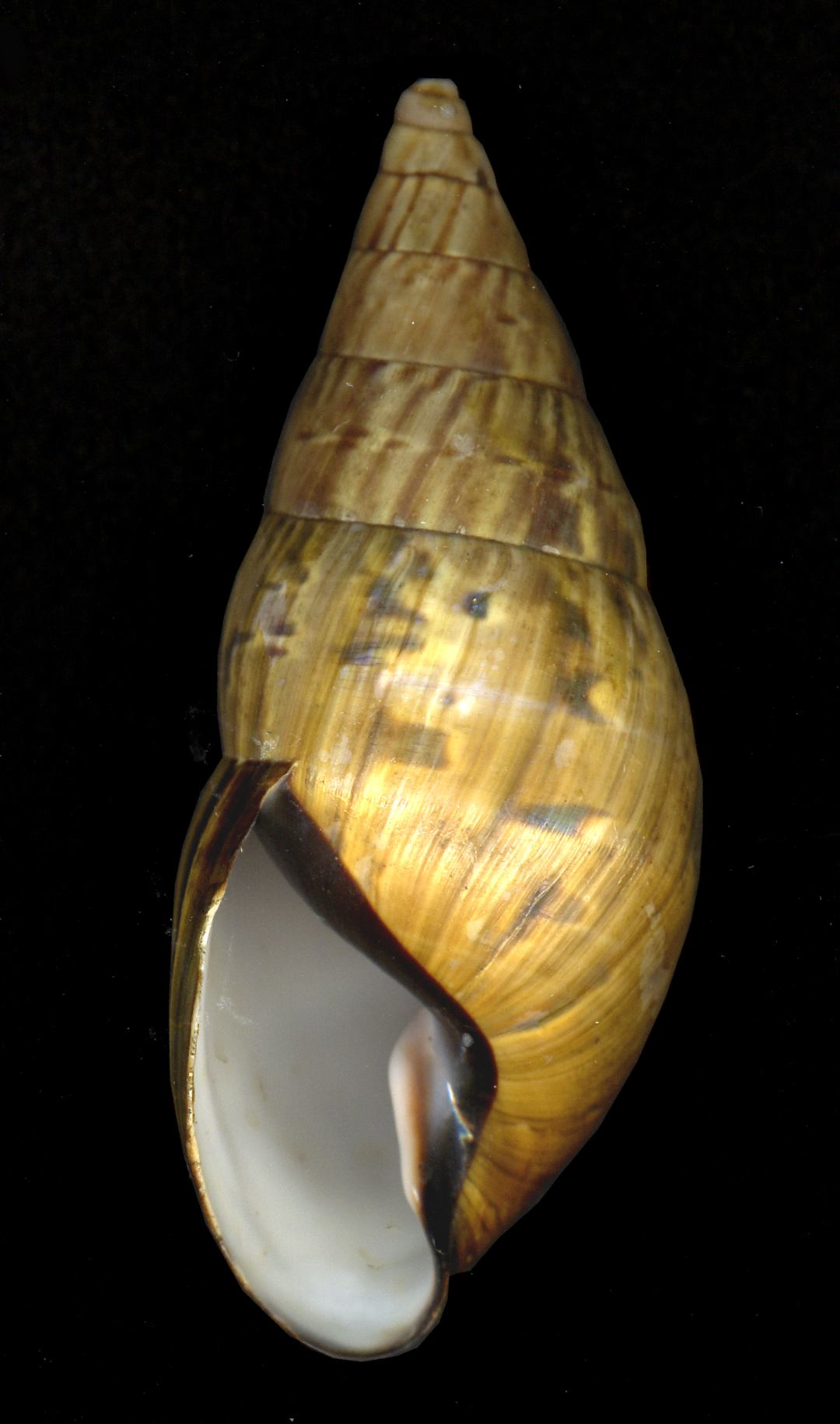
- shell of Corona perversa

Scientific classification
- Kingdom: Animalia
- Phylum: Mollusca
- Class: Gastropoda
- Order: Stylommatophora
- Family: Orthalicidae
- Genus: Corona
- Species: C. perversa

Binomial name
- Corona perversa (Swainson, 1820)

Synonyms
- Orthalicus (Laeorthalicus) reginaeformis Strebel, 1909 (junior synonym); Orthalicus reginaeformis Strebel, 1909

= Corona perversa =

Species of gastropod

Corona perversa is a species of air-breathing land snail, a terrestrial pulmonate gastropod mollusk in the family Orthalicidae.

The shell of Corona perversa is normally left-handed or sinistral. This species lives in Brazil.

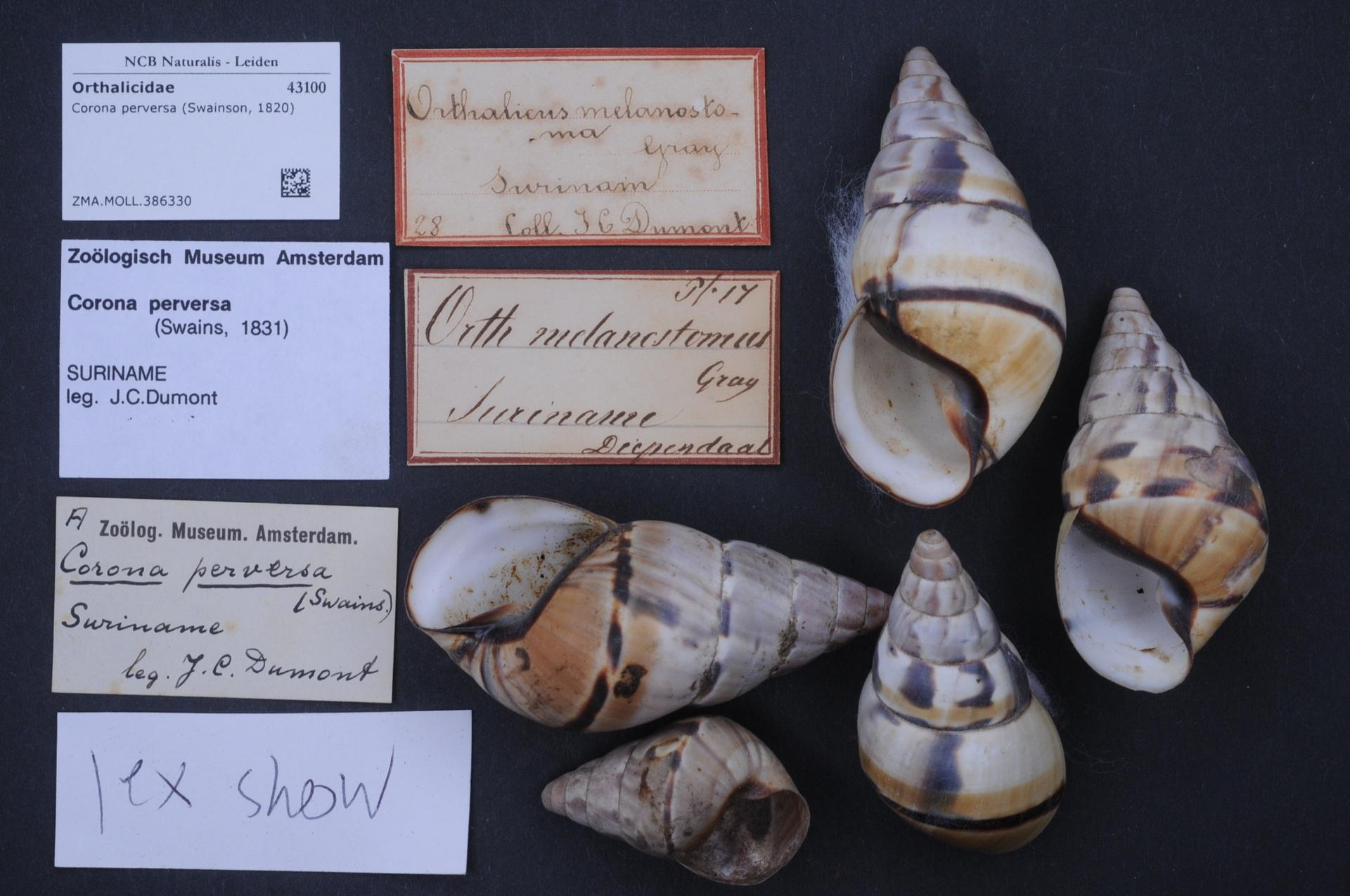
Corona perversa (Swainson, 1820), museum specimen
