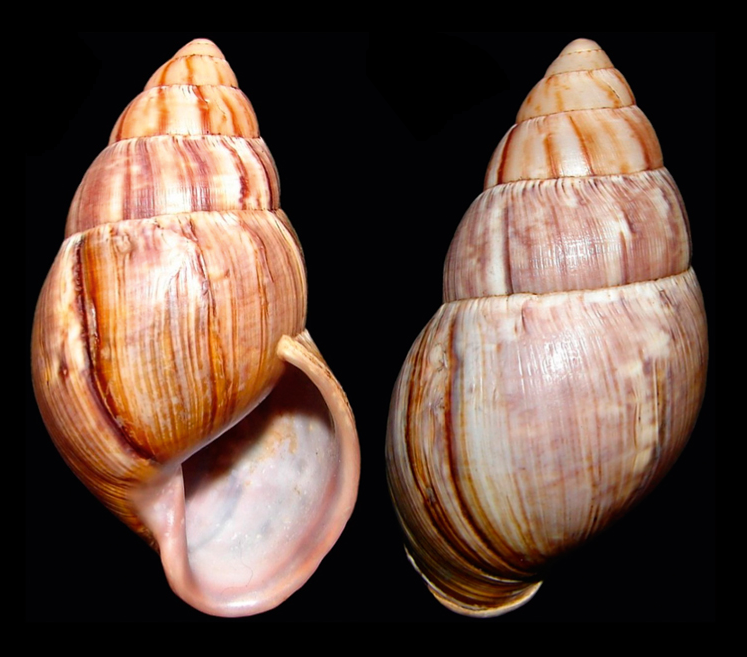
- apertural and abapertural view of the shell of Thaumastus flori Shell height 65.0 mm.

Scientific classification
- Kingdom: Animalia
- Phylum: Mollusca
- Class: Gastropoda
- Order: Stylommatophora
- Family: Megaspiridae
- Genus: Thaumastus
- Species: T. flori

Binomial name
- Thaumastus flori (Jousseaume, 1897)

Synonyms
- Dryptus flori Jousseaume, 1897; Plekocheilus conspicuus Pilsbry, 1932

= Thaumastus flori =

Species of gastropod

Thaumastus flori is a species of tropical air-breathing land snail, a pulmonate gastropod mollusc in the family Megaspiridae.

== Distribution ==
- southern Ecuador. The type locality is Machala.
- Peru

== Description ==
Variability of shells:

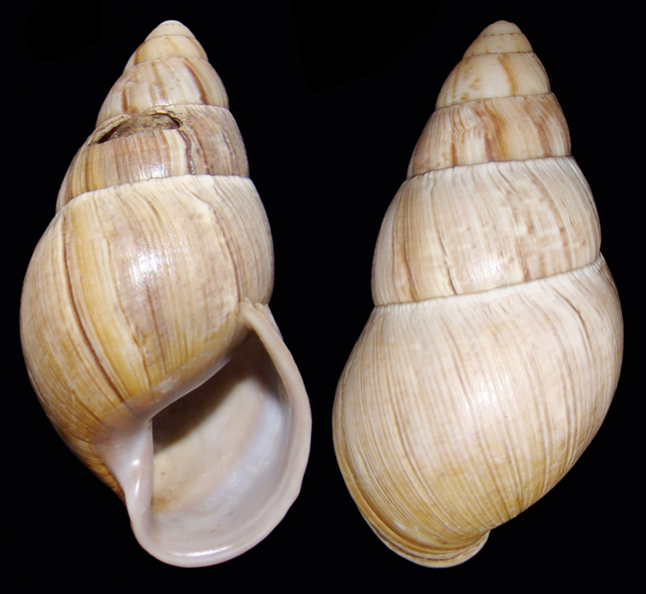
shell of Thaumastus flori. Shell height 64.4 mm.

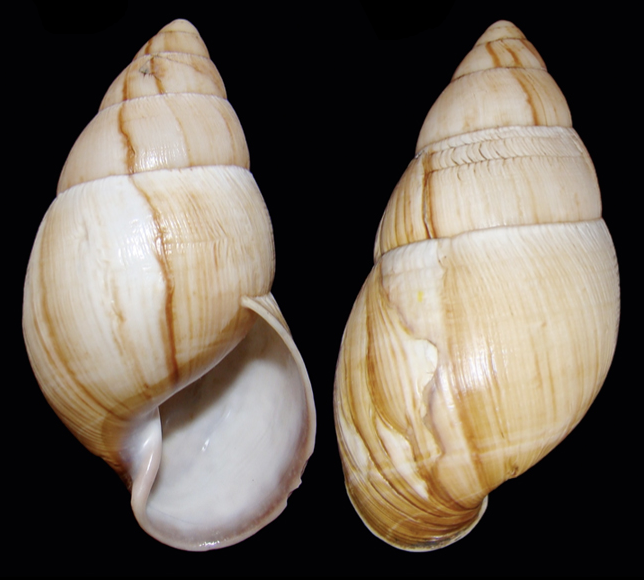
shell of Thaumastus flori. Shell height 77.6 mm.

== See also ==
- Thaumastus hartwegi (Pfeiffer, 1846) is a species with a similar shell.
