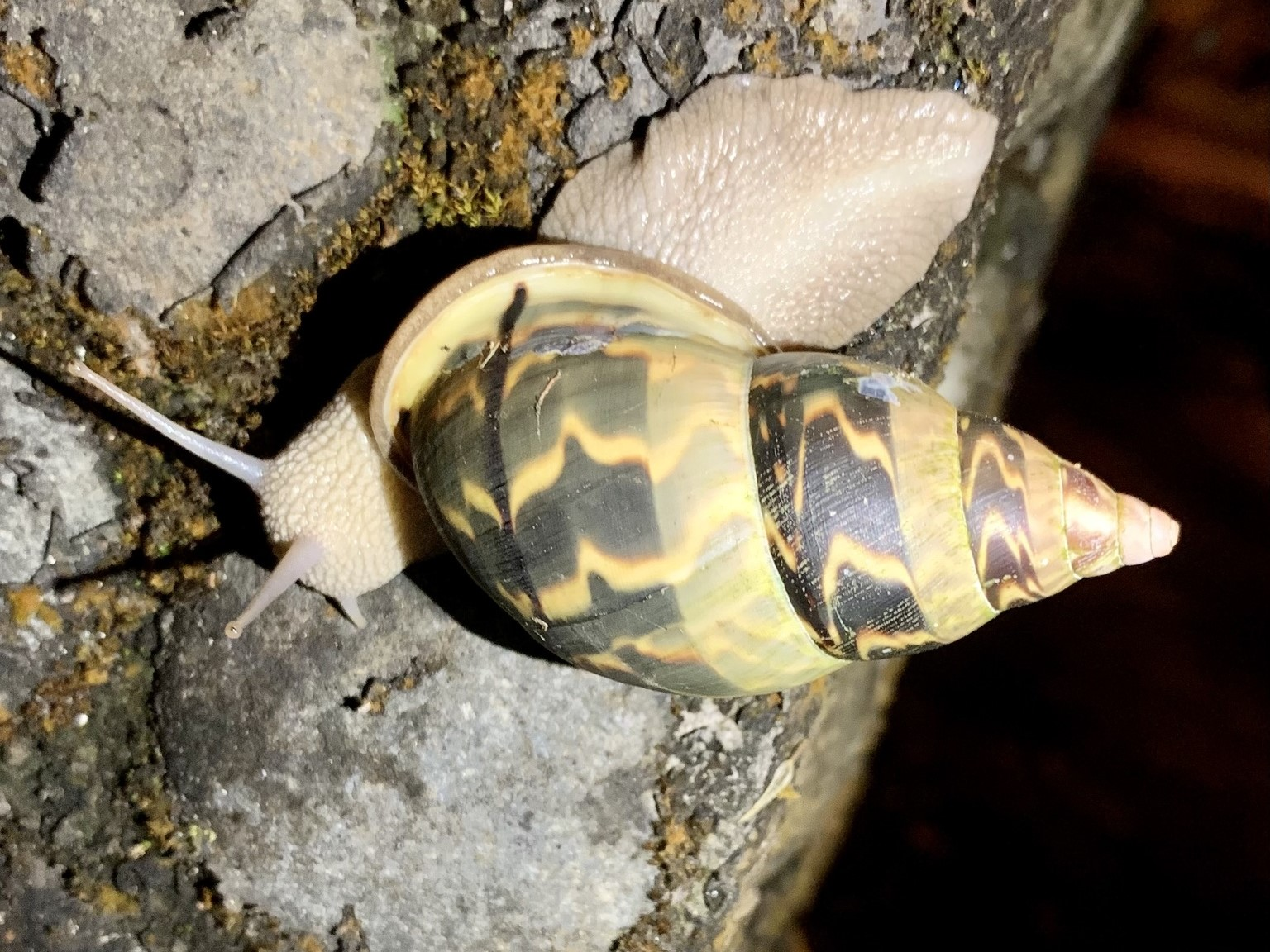
- Sultana deburghiae

Scientific classification
- Kingdom: Animalia
- Phylum: Mollusca
- Class: Gastropoda
- Order: Stylommatophora
- Suborder: Helicina
- Superfamily: Orthalicoidea
- Family: Orthalicidae
- Genus: Sultana; Shuttleworth, 1856

Type species
- Helix sultana Dillwyn, 1817

Synonyms
- Orthalicus (Sultana) Shuttleworth, 1856; Orthalicus (Trachyorthalicus) Strebel, 1909; Sultana (Metorthalicus) Pilsbry, 1899; Sultana (Sultana) Shuttleworth, 1856; Sultana (Trachyorthalicus) Strebel, 1909

= Sultana (gastropod) =

Genus of gastropods

Sultana is a genus of air-breathing land snails, terrestrial pulmonate gastropod mollusks in the family Orthalicidae.

== Species ==
Species in the genus Sultana include:

- Sultana atramentaria (L. Pfeiffer, 1855)
- Sultana augusti (Jousseaume, 1887)
- Sultana deburghiae (Reeve, 1859)
- Sultana elizabethae Ahuir & Torres, 2019
- Sultana fraseri (Pfeiffer, 1860)
- Sultana hidalgoi Vega-Luz, 2021
- Sultana kelletti (Reeve, 1850)
- Sultana labeo (Broderip, 1828)
- Sultana liae Vega-Luz, 2021
- Sultana macandrewi (G. B. Sowerby III, 1889)
- Sultana maranhonensis (Albers, 1854)
- Sultana meobambensis (Pfeiffer, 1855)
- Sultana powisiana (Petit de la Saussaye, 1843)
- Sultana shuttleworthi (Albers, 1854)
- Sultana sultana (Dillwyn, 1817)
- Sultana wrzeesniowskii (Lubomirski, 1880)
- Sultana yatesi (L. Pfeiffer, 1855)
