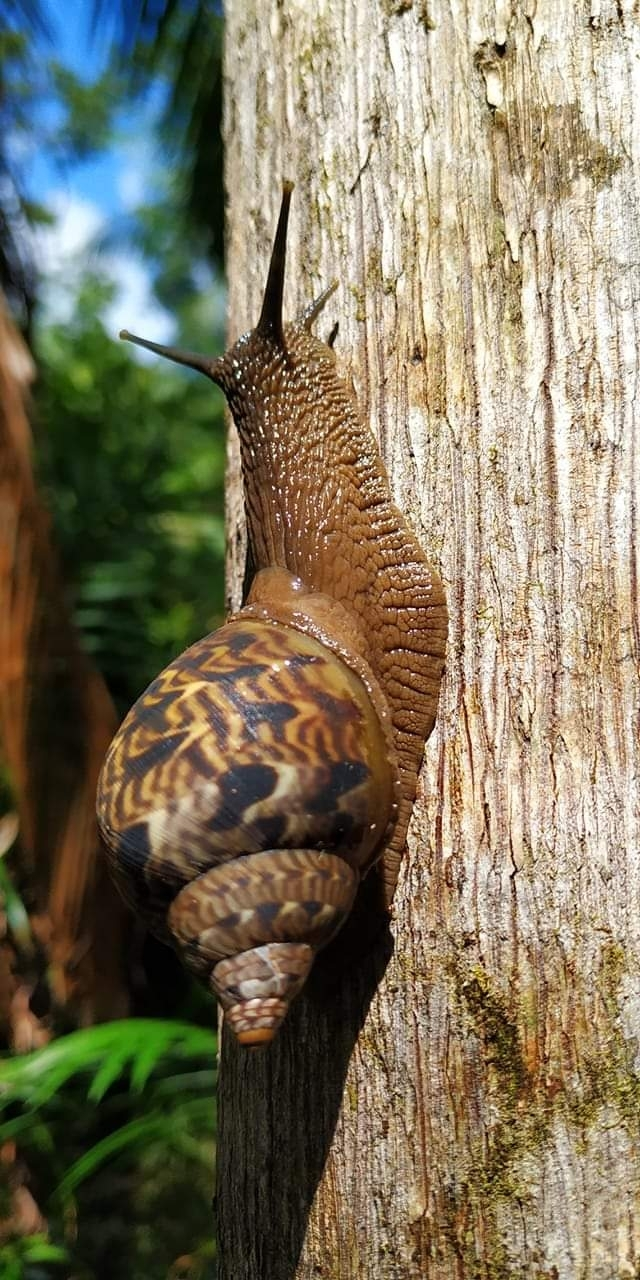

Scientific classification
- Kingdom: Animalia
- Phylum: Mollusca
- Class: Gastropoda
- Order: Stylommatophora
- Superfamily: Orthalicoidea
- Family: Orthalicidae
- Genus: Sultana
- Species: S. sultana

Binomial name
- Sultana sultana (Dillwyn, 1817)

Synonyms
- Helix sultana Dillwyn, 1817 (basionym); Orthalicus sultana (Dillwyn, 1817) (unaccepted combination); Orthalicus sultana angustior Preston, 1914 (junior synonym); Orthalicus trullisatus Shuttleworth, 1856 (junior synonym); Sultana sultana angustior (Preston, 1914) (superseded subspecific combination); Sultana sultana sultana (Dillwyn, 1817) (superseded subspecific combination)

= Sultana sultana =

Species of gastropod

Sultana sultana is a species of snail from the genus Sultana.

This species was first described by Lewis Weston Dillwyn in 1817.

== Description ==
Sultana sultana is a land snail. It has a shell height of 87.4 and a diameter 54.5 mm.

== Habitat and range ==
This species occurs widely across South America, findings have been documented in Panama, Colombia, Ecuador, Peru, Bolivia, Brazil, French Guiana, and Suriname. Recent observations through citizen science apps, confirm these documented recordings.

It has an habitat at low altitude and in moist forests.
