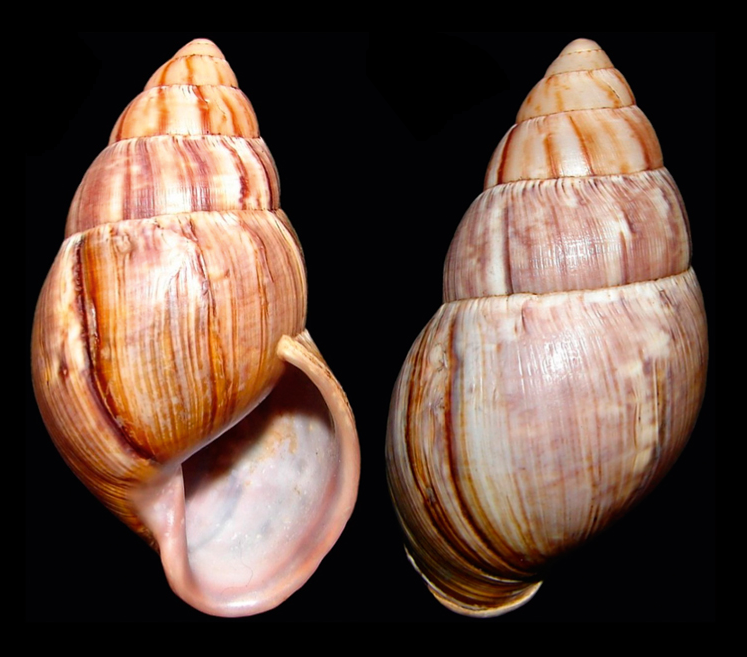
- Apertural and abapertural views of a shell of Thaumastus flori

Scientific classification
- Kingdom: Animalia
- Phylum: Mollusca
- Class: Gastropoda
- Order: Stylommatophora
- Suborder: Helicina
- Superfamily: Orthalicoidea
- Family: Megaspiridae; Pilsbry, 1904

= Megaspiridae =

Family of gastropods

Megaspiridae is a family of air-breathing land snails, terrestrial pulmonate gastropod mollusks in the superfamily Orthalicoidea (according to the taxonomy of the Gastropoda by Bouchet & Rocroi, 2005).

The family Megaspiridae has no subfamilies.

== Genera ==
Genera within the family Megaspiridae include:

- Callionepion Pilsbry & Vanatta, 1899
- Koltrora Simone, 2024
- Kora Simone, 2012
- Megaspira Lea, 1838 - type genus of the family Megaspiridae
- Paeniscutalus Wurtz, 1947
- Thaumastus Albers, 1860 - synonym: Tholus Strebel, 1909

Synonyms

- Orphnus Albers, 1850: synonym of Thaumastus E. von Martens, 1860 (junior homonym, invalid: not McLeay, 1819)
- Pachytholus Strebel, 1909: synonym of Thaumastus E. von Martens, 1860 (junior subjective synonym)
- Pyrgelix H. Beck, 1837: synonym of Megaspira I. Lea, 1836
- Tatutor Jousseaume, 1887: synonym of Thaumastus E. von Martens, 1860
- Tholus Strebel, 1909: synonym of Thaumastus E. von Martens, 1860
