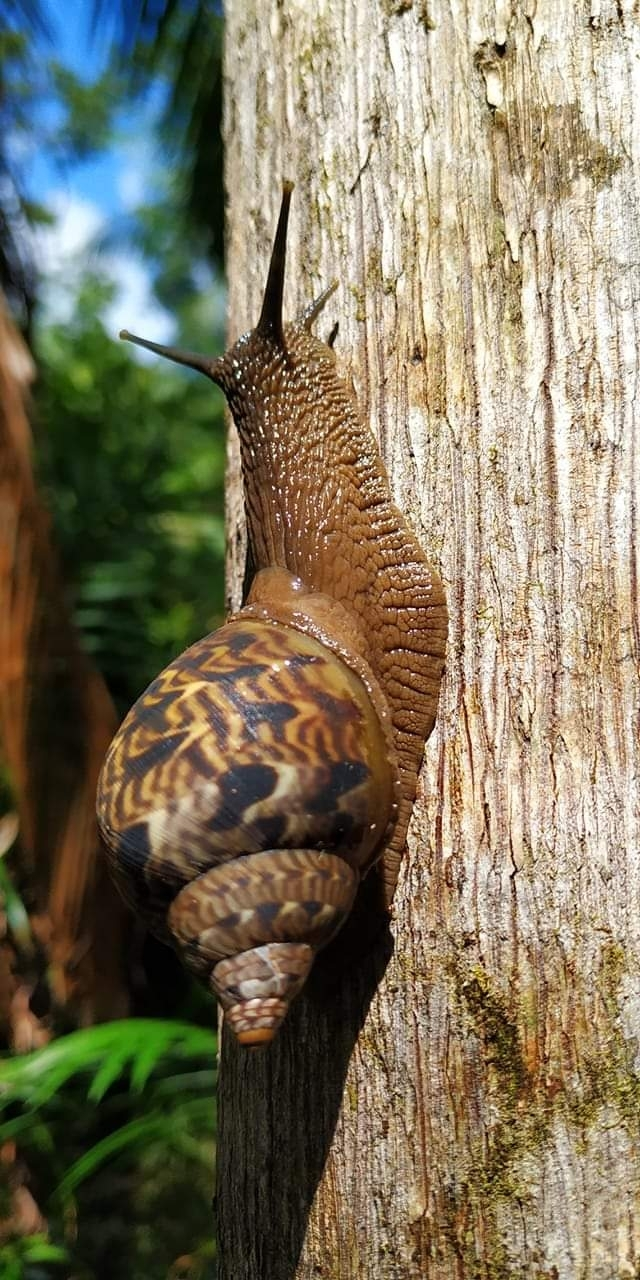
- Sultana sultana

Scientific classification
- Kingdom: Animalia
- Phylum: Mollusca
- Class: Gastropoda
- Order: Stylommatophora
- Suborder: Helicina
- Superfamily: Orthalicoidea
- Family: Orthalicidae; Albers, 1860

Synonyms
- Liguidae Pilsbry, 1891

= Orthalicidae =

Family of gastropods

Orthalicidae (orthalicid land snails) are a family of tropical air-breathing land snails, terrestrial pulmonate gastropod mollusks are classified in the superfamily Orthalicoidea of the order Stylommatophora.

They are medium-sized to large snails, from about 3 cm (about 1.2 inches) to 9 cm (about 3.5 inches) in shell length

== Taxonomy ==
In former times, this family was often known as the Bulimulidae, but this term may also denote what today is the subfamily Bulimulinae. The subfamily Bulimulinae replaces the former family Bulimulidae Crosse & P. Fischer, 1873.

=== 2005 taxonomy ===
The Orthalicidae belong to the Orthalicoidea, a superfamily in the order Sigmurethra. Like other stylommatophorans, the Sigmurethra belong to the suborder Helicina. Among the three subfamilies of Orthalicidae, the Bulimulinae are the most diverse, consisting of three tribes:

- subfamily Amphibuliminae P. Fischer, 1873 - synonym Peltellinae Gray, 1855 (check decision of International Commission on Zoological Nomenclature for Peltellinae) - 17 species
- subfamily Bulimulinae Tryon, 1867 - 1243 species
  - tribe Bulimulini Tryon, 1867 - synonyms: Bulimidae Guilding, 1828 (inv.); Berendtiinae P. Fischer & Crosse, 1872; Bothiembryontidae Iredale, 1937
  - tribe Odontostomini Pilsbry & Vanatta, 1898 - 125 species
  - tribe Simpulopsini Schileyko, 1999 - synonym: Tomogeridae Jousseaume, 1877
- subfamily Orthalicinae Albers, 1850 - synonym: Liguidae Pilsbry, 1891 - 83 species

=== 2010 taxonomy ===
Breure et al. (2010) elevated Bulimulinae to Bulimulidae, Odontostomini to Odontostomidae, Amphibuliminae to Amphibulimidae.

=== 2012 taxonomy ===
Breure & Romero (2012) confirmed previous results from 2010, additionally they elevated Simpulopsini to Simpulopsidae.

== Genera ==
Genera within the family Orthalicidae include:

- Aposcutalus Dutra & Leme, 1985
- Clathrorthalicus Strebel, 1909
- Corona Albers, 1850
- † Cortana Salvador & Simone, 2013
- Hemibulimus Martens, 1885
- Kara Strebel, 1910
- Liguus Montfort, 1810
- Orthalicus Beck, 1837 - type genus of the family Orthalicidae
- Paeniscutalus Wurtz, 1947
- Porphyrobaphe Shuttleworth, 1856
- Quechua Strebel, 1910
- Scholvienia Strebel, 1910
- Sultana Shuttleworth, 1856
