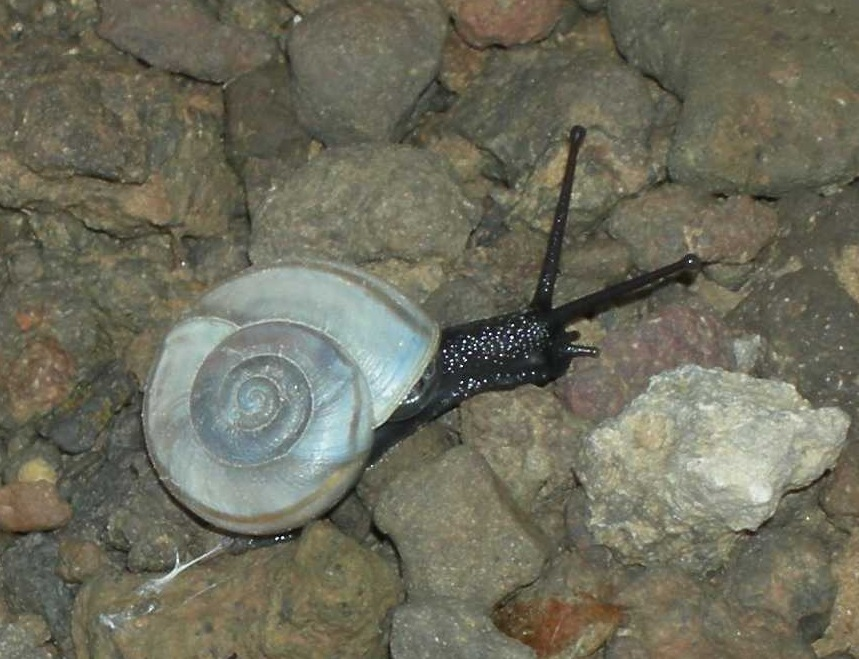
- Sonorella allynsmithi
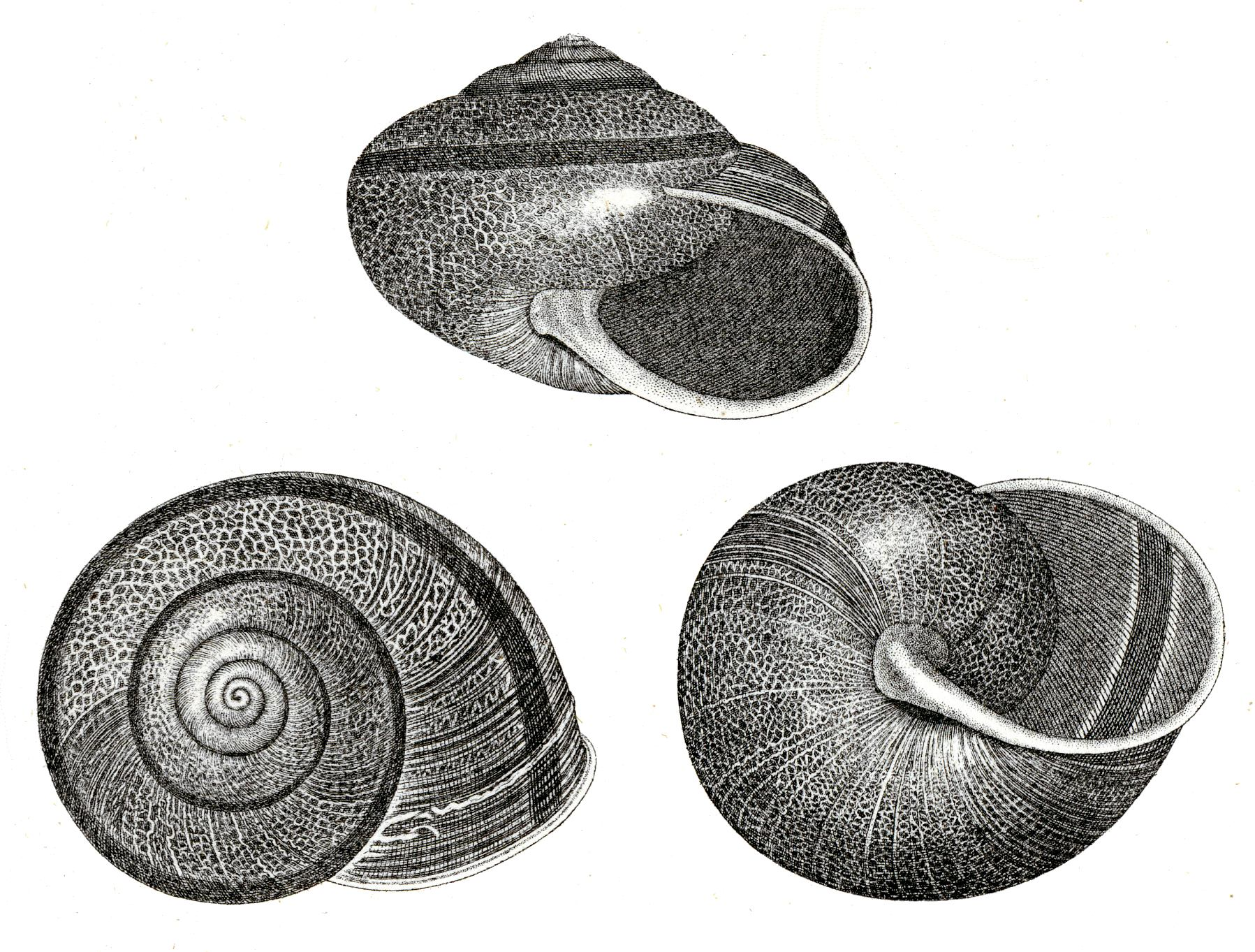
- Three views of a shell of Helminthoglypta tudiculata taken from W. G. Binney, 1878

Scientific classification
- Kingdom: Animalia
- Phylum: Mollusca
- Class: Gastropoda
- Order: Stylommatophora
- Infraorder: Helicoidei
- Superfamily: Helicoidea
- Family: Xanthonychidae
- Subfamily: Helminthoglyptinae; Pilsbry, 1939

Synonyms
- Helminthoglyptidae Pilsbry, 1939

= Helminthoglyptinae =

Subfamily of land snails

The Helminthoglyptinae are a subfamily of air-breathing land snails, terrestrial pulmonate gastropod mollusks within the family Xanthonychidae.

This is a large and diverse group of new world snails, ranging in distribution from Alaska through North America to the West Indies, Central America, and as far south as Argentina.

The shells are typically of medium to large size, with no apertural teeth but usually with a reflected apertural lip.

== Anatomy ==
In the species in this family, the diverticulum may be present or absent. They possess a single dart apparatus with one stylophore (dart sac) and two mucous glands. These snails use the love dart as part of their mating behavior.

In this subfamily, the number of haploid chromosomes lies between 26 and 30 (according to the values in this table).

== Taxonomy ==
The basic nomenclature and taxonomy of this large and complex subfamily of land snails has been the subject of many modifications, and the list of genera given here is applicable only when the subfamily is broadly interpreted. Many of these snail genera have been placed by various authors in more restrictively defined families, such as: Cepolidae, Epiphragmophoridae, Humboldtianidae, Monadeniidae, and Xanthonychidae.

Tribes in the subfamily Helminthoglyptinae include (according to the taxonomy of the Gastropoda by Bouchet & Rocroi, 2005):

- tribe Helminthoglyptini Pilsbry, 1939
  - subtribe Helminthoglyptina Pilsbry, 1939: the mucous glands lie adjacent to the vagina or to the sheath of the dart apparatus; the ducts of the glands are provided with bulbous reservoirs.
  - subtribe Micrariontina Schileyko, 1991: the mucous glands lie adjacent to the dart sac; in part the dart apparatus is missing.
- tribe Sonorelicini Roth, 1996

Subfamily Sonorellinae Pilsbry, 1939: the diverticulum and the dart apparatus are absent.

== Genera ==
ITIS listed 16 genera under Helminthoglyptidae.WoRMS added the two genera Greggelix and Micrarionta, as well as dividing the subfamily into two tribes. They are listed below:

- Helminthoglyptini Pilsbry, 1939
  - Cahuillus B. Roth, 1996
  - Chamaearionta S.S. Berry, 1930
  - Eremarionta Pilsbry, 1913
  - Eremariontoides W.B. Miller, 1981
  - Greggelix W.B. Miller, 1972
  - Helminthoglypta Ancey, 1887 - type genus of the family Helminthoglyptidae and subtribe Helminthoglyptina
  - Herpeteros Berry, 1947
  - Micrarionta Ancey, 1880 - type genus of the subtribe Micrariontina
  - Martirelix W.B. Miller, 1982
  - Noyo Roth, 1996
  - Plesarionta Pilsbry, 1939
  - Rothelix Miller, 1985
  - Sonorelix Berry, 1943 - was listed as type genus of the tribe Sonorelicini
  - Xerarionta Pilsbry, 1913
- Sonorellini Pilsbry, 1939
  - Maricopella Roth, 1996
  - Mohavelix Berry, 1943
  - Myotophallus Pilsbry, 1939
  - Sonorella Pilsbry, 1900 - was listed as type genus of the subfamily Sonorellinae (now Sonorellini)

Genera listed below has an unknown origin:

- Averellia Ancey, 1887
- Cepolis Montfort, 1810
- Dialeuca Albers, 1850
- Hemitrochus Swainson, 1840
- Humboldtiana Ihering, 1892
- Leptarionta Fischer & Crosse, 1872
- Polymita Beck, 1837
- Setipellis Pilsbry, 1926
- Tryonigens Pilsbry, 1927

The taxon listed below was moved into another taxon:

- Xanthonyx Crosse & Fischer, 1867: Now under Xanthonychidae.
