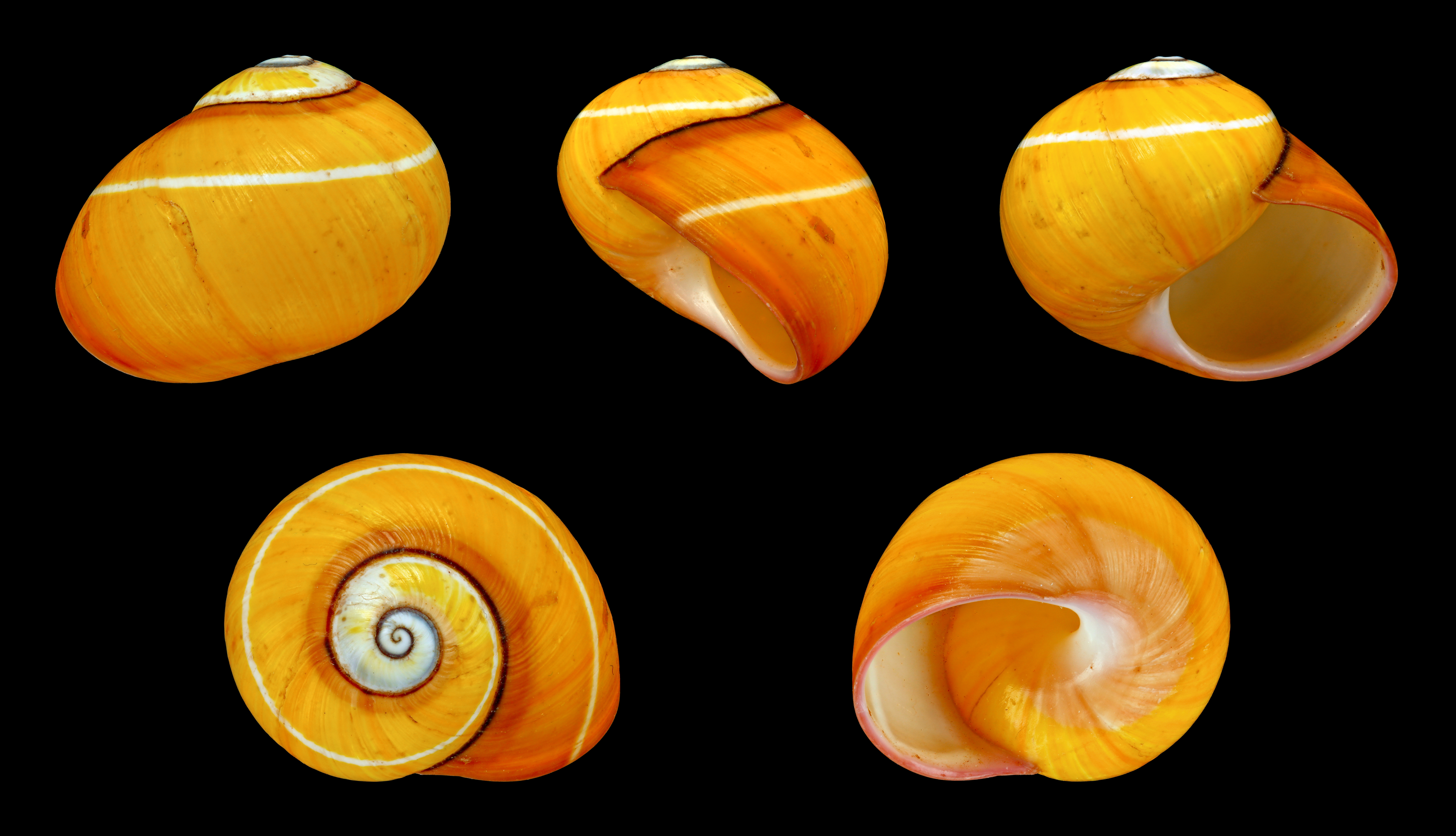
- Five views of a shell of Polymita picta, typical colour

Conservation status
- CITES Appendix I

Scientific classification
- Kingdom: Animalia
- Phylum: Mollusca
- Class: Gastropoda
- Order: Stylommatophora
- Family: Helminthoglyptidae
- Genus: Polymita
- Species: P. picta

Binomial name
- Polymita picta (Born, 1778)

= Polymita picta =

Species of gastropod

Polymita picta, also known as the Cuban painted snail, or the oriente tree snail, is a species of large, air-breathing land snail, a terrestrial pulmonate gastropod mollusk in the family Cepolidae.

It is the type species of the genus Polymita, and is endemic to Eastern Cuba.

== Subspecies and varietas ==
Subspecies and varietas within this species include:

- Polymita picta picta
  - Polymita picta picta var. muscata Torre 1950
  - Polymita picta picta var. multifasciata Torre 1950
  - Polymita picta picta var. dimidiata Torre 1950
  - Polymita picta picta var. obscurata Torre 1950
- Polymita picta iolimbata Torre 1950
  - Polymita picta iolimbata var. iofasciata Torre 1950
  - Polymita picta iolimbata var. iosaturata Torre 1950
  - Polymita picta iolimbata var. iodimidiata Torre 1950
- Polymita picta fuscolimbata Torre 1950
  - Polymita picta fuscolimbata Torre 1950
  - Polymita picta fuscolimbata var. elevata Torre 1950
- Polymita picta nigrolimbata Torre 1950
  - Polymita picta nigrolimbata var. fulminata Torre 1950
  - Polymita picta nigrolimbata var. nigrofasciata Torre 1950
- Polymita picta roseolimbata Torre 1950
  - Polymita picta roseolimbata forma minor Torre 1950
  - Polymita picta roseolimbata var. virgata Torre 1950
  - Polymita picta roseolimbata var. albolimbata Torre 1950

== Distribution and habitat ==
This snail is endemic to Cuba. They are spread throughout eastern Cuba, particularly within Alexander von Humboldt National Park, which extends from the mountains to the northeastern coast of the island. These arboreal molluscs live mainly in coastal habitats in the subtropical forest, with a preference for certain tree species including Chrysobalanus icaco, Metopium toxiferum, Metopium brownei, Bursera simaruba and Coccoloba retusa.

== Description ==
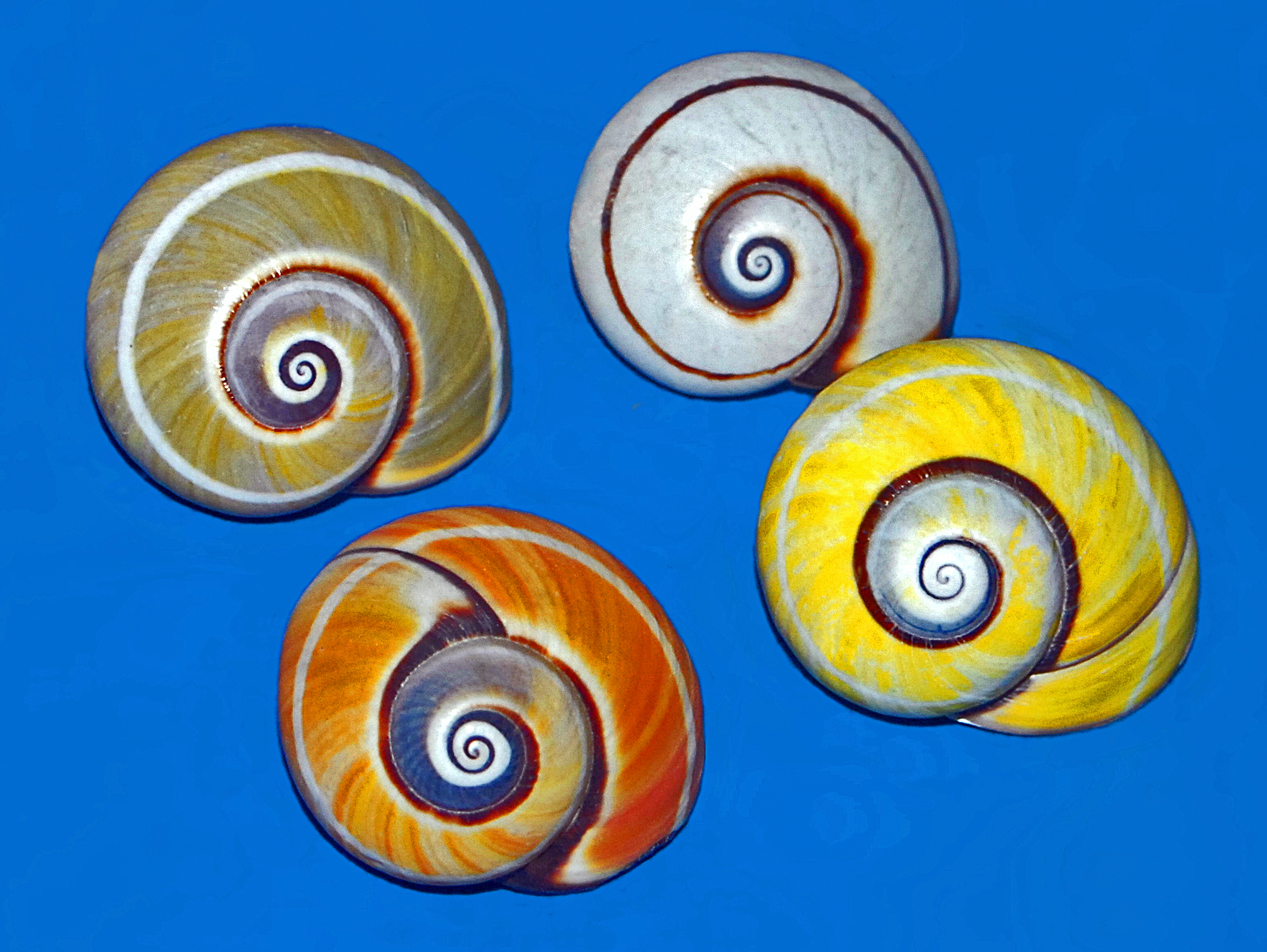
Variability of the Painted snail

Shells of Polymita picta can reach a length of about 20 millimetres (0.79 in). These large shells are shiny and very brightly colored. Normally they show a bright yellow color with a white stripe, but the species is well known for its colourful shell polymorphism, with numerous color varieties.

Shell colors vary (polymorphism) depending on the diet of the snail. Some researchers suspect it is a defense mechanism to evade predators by confusing them.

== Conservation ==
The snails' shells are sought after by poachers and used to make jewelry and trinkets. As a result, the species has become endangered. It is a protected species since 1943 under a law that prohibits its export except for scientific reasons.

== Biology ==
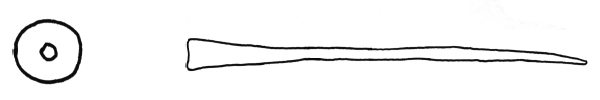
Drawing of a love dart of P. picta

Polymita picta mainly feeds on lichen, moss and on fungal biofilms present on bark and leaves. The life cycle lasts about 15 months, with breeding time during the wet season (September- October). The snails become dormant in the dry season (December- beginning of May).

Like most air-breathing land snails, Polymita picta has female and male reproductive organs (hermaphroditic), it is unable to self-fertilize. Moreover similarly to other gastropods in the superfamily Helicoidea, this species uses love darts as part of its mating behavior. Mating can be divided into three stages: courtship, copulation and post-copulation. This can appear as wiping, running, and stabbing known as dart apparatus. During the courtship these snails spear the partner with a calcareous dart.

== Gallery ==
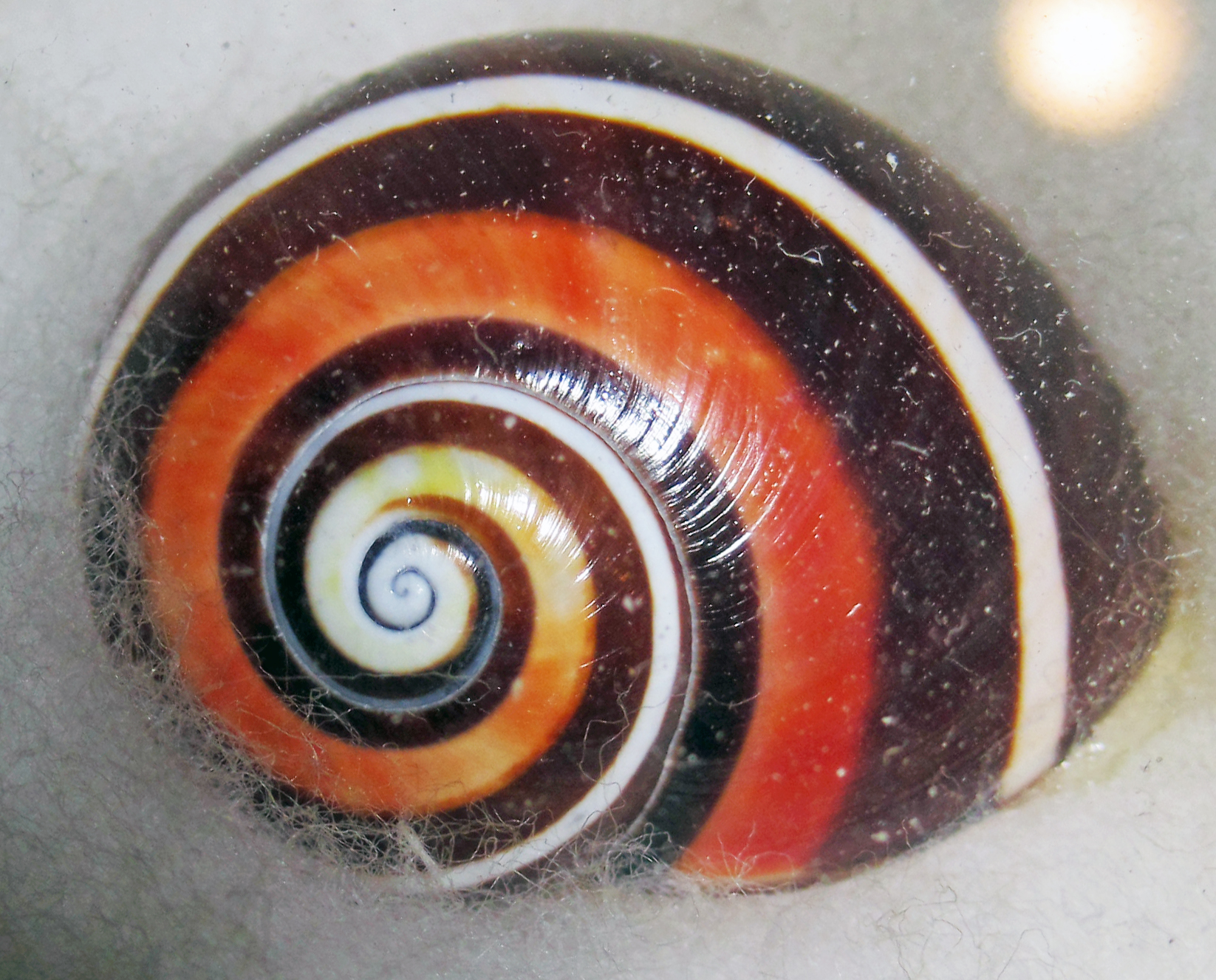

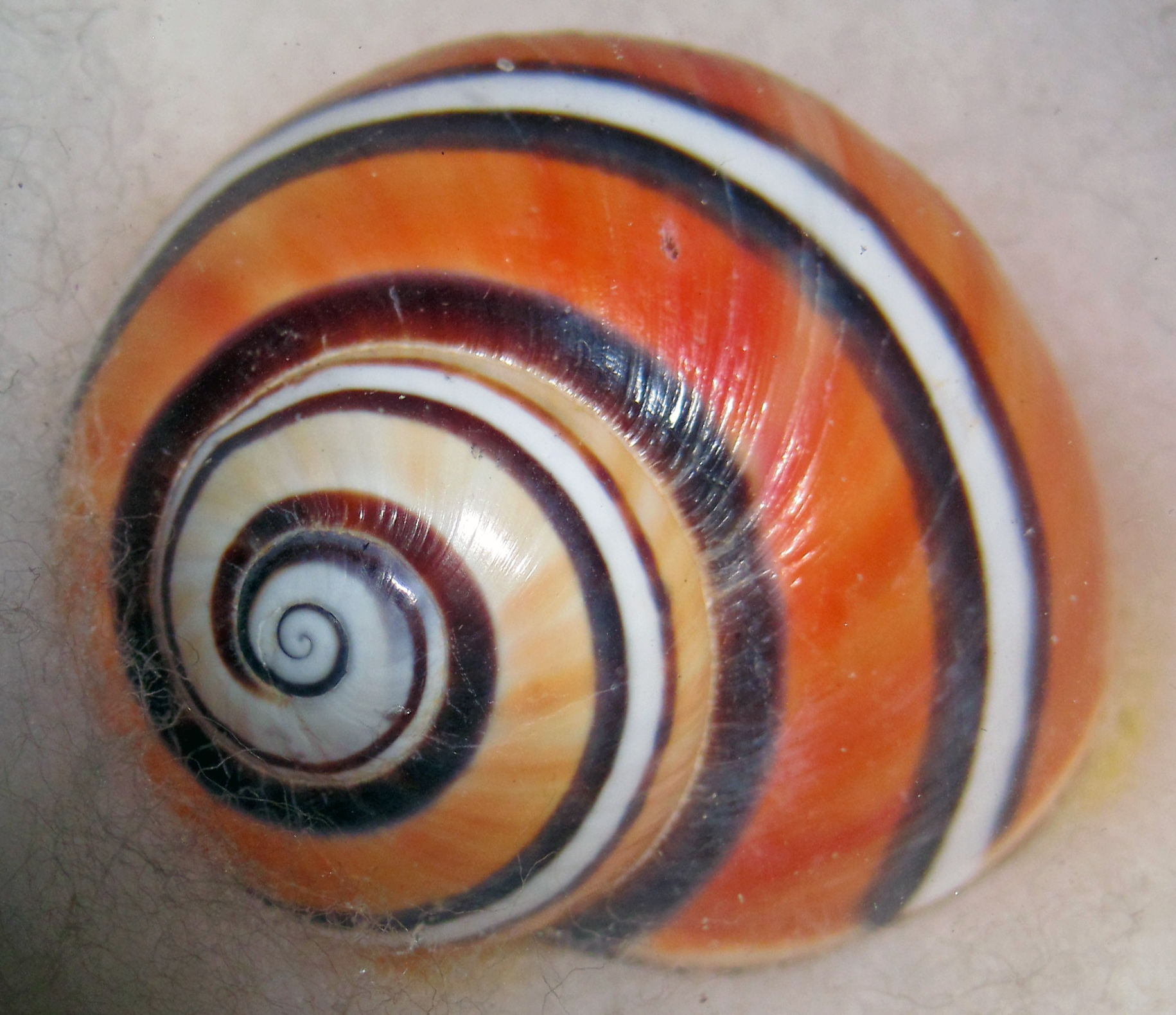

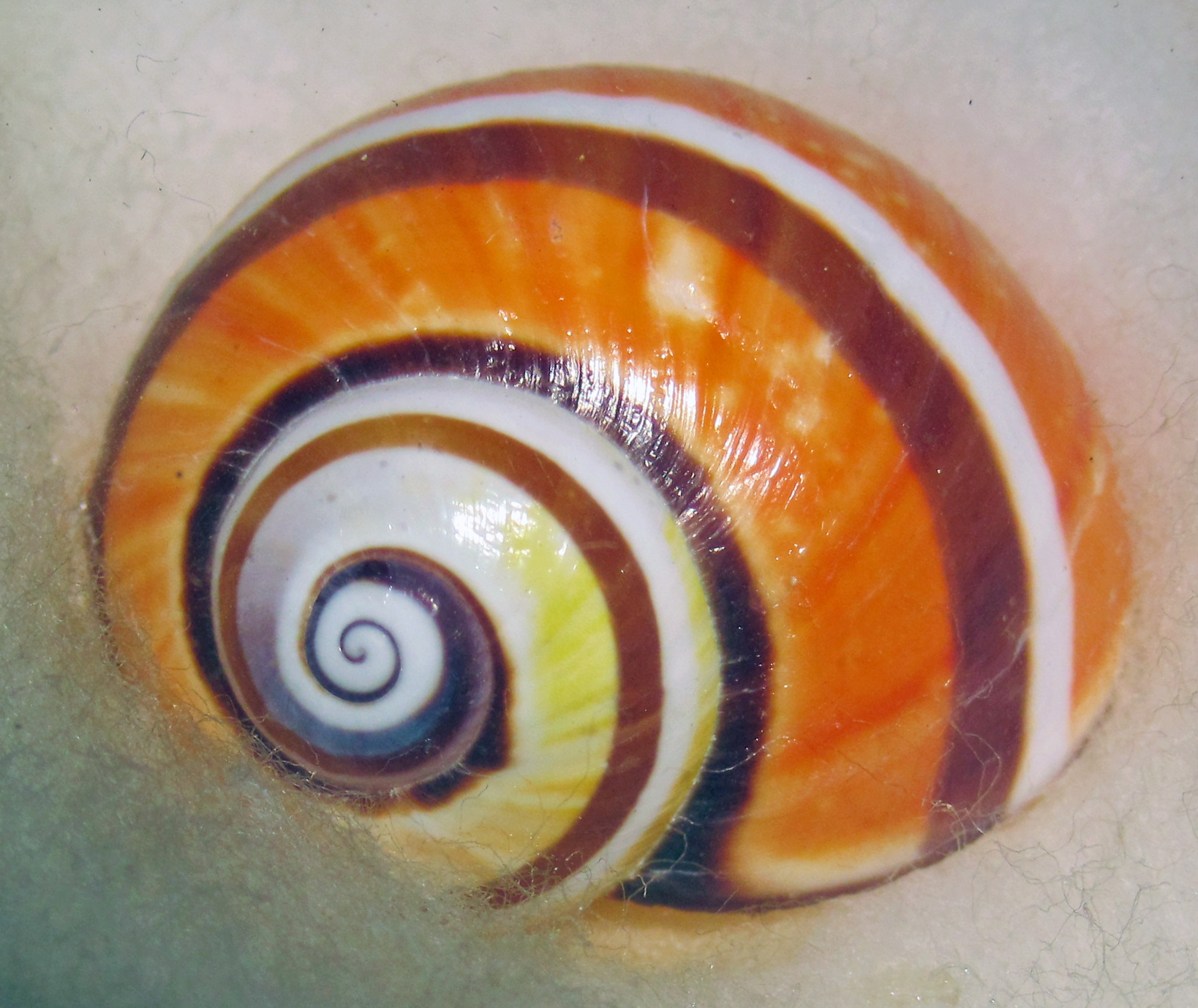

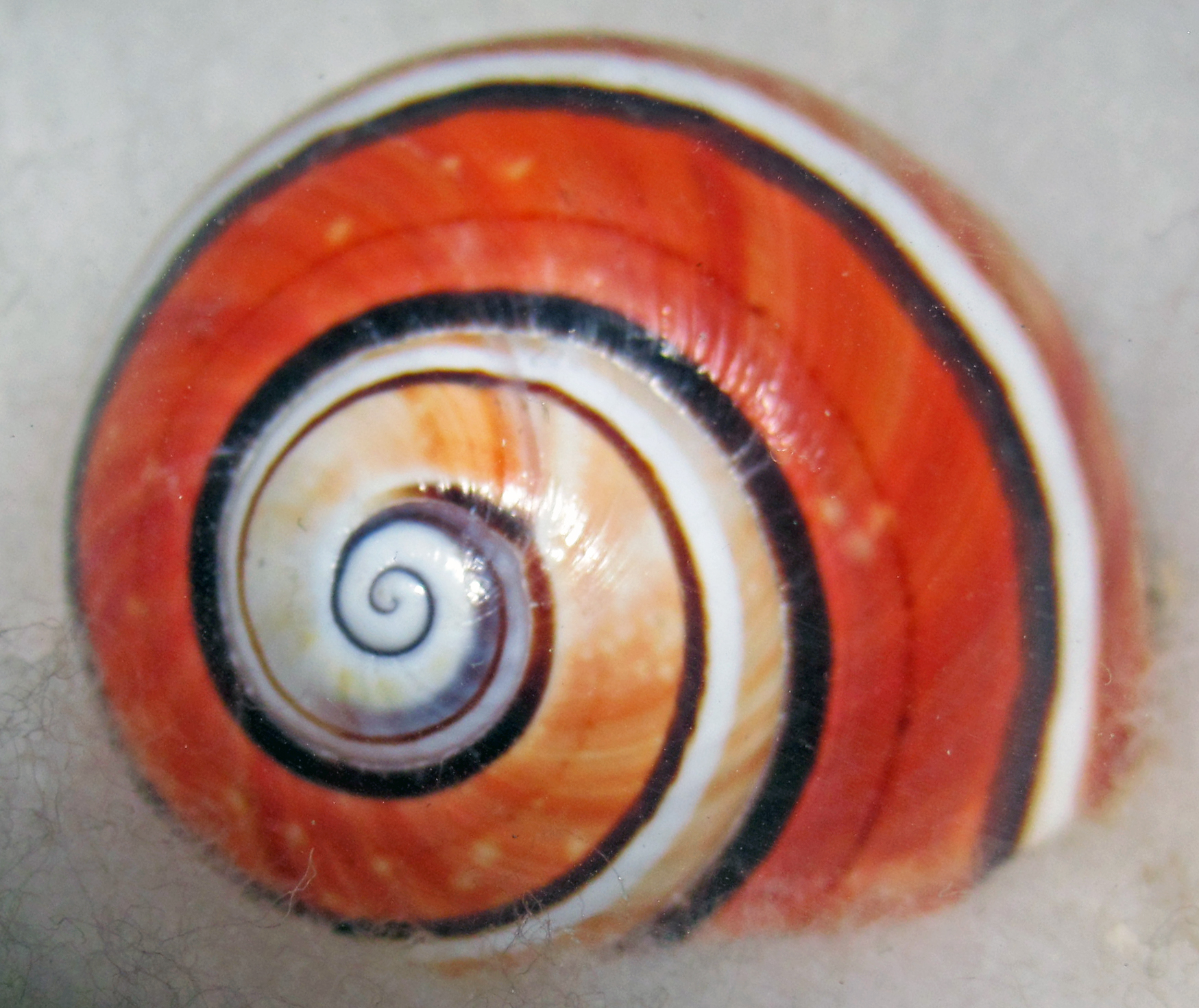

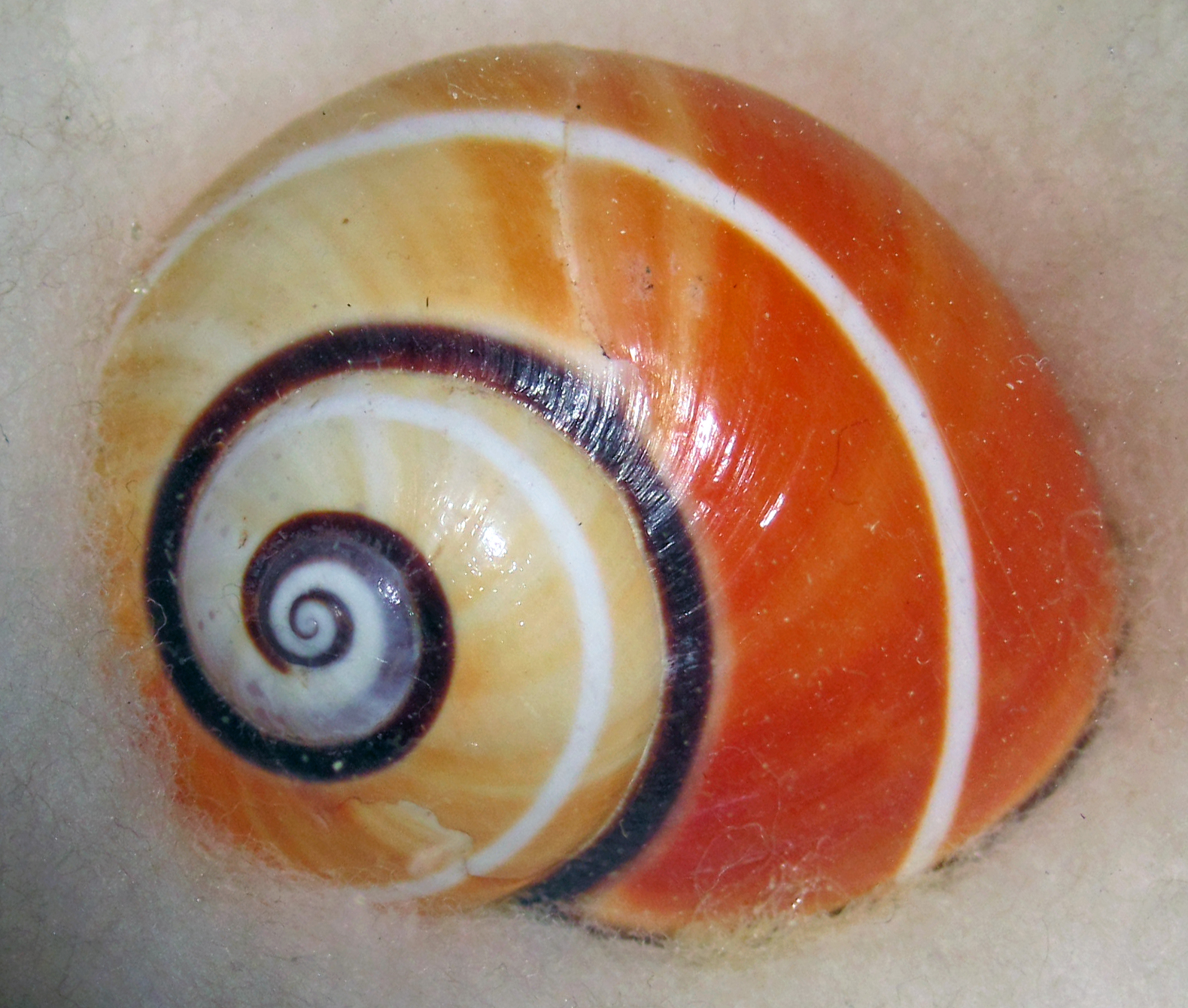

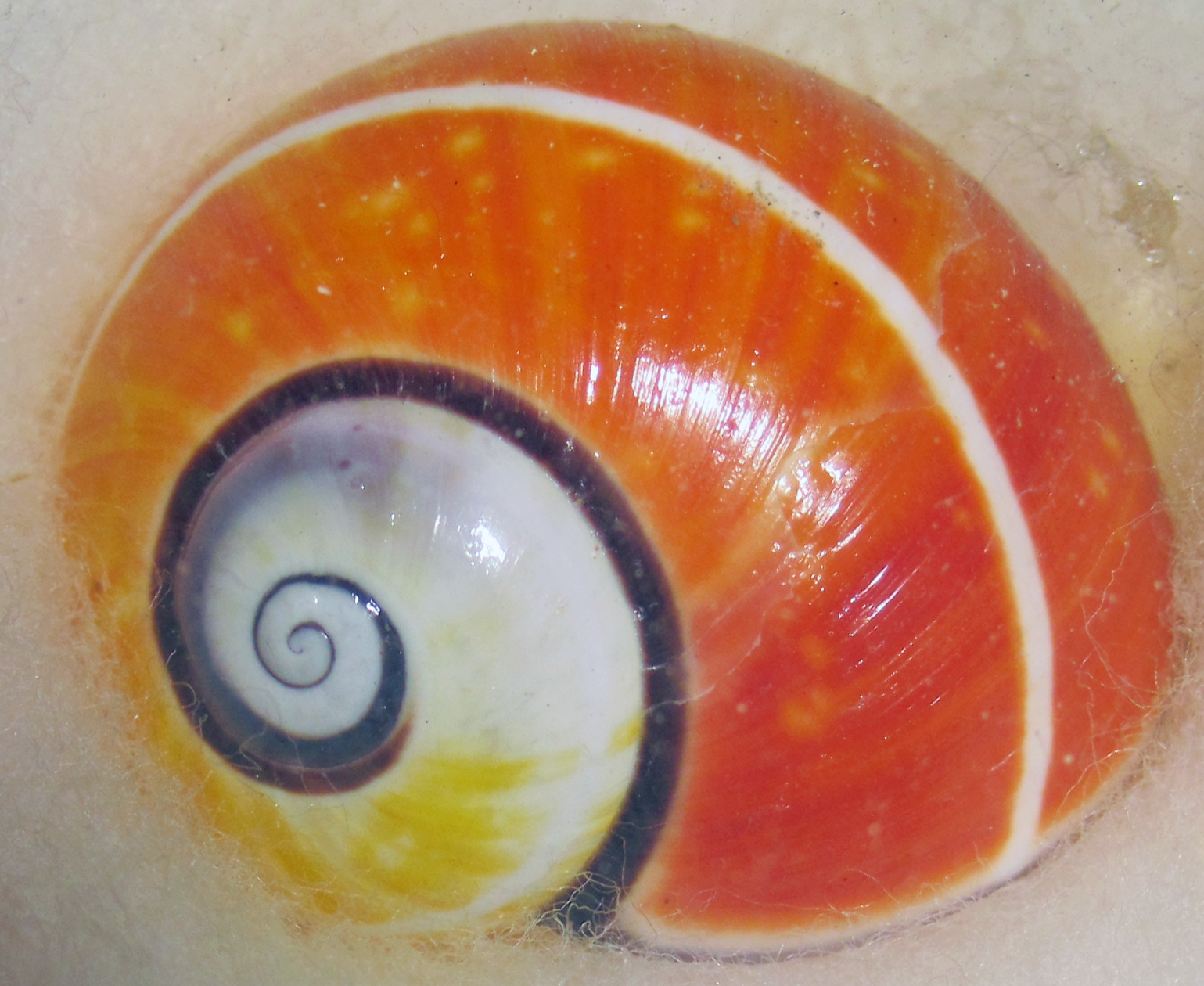

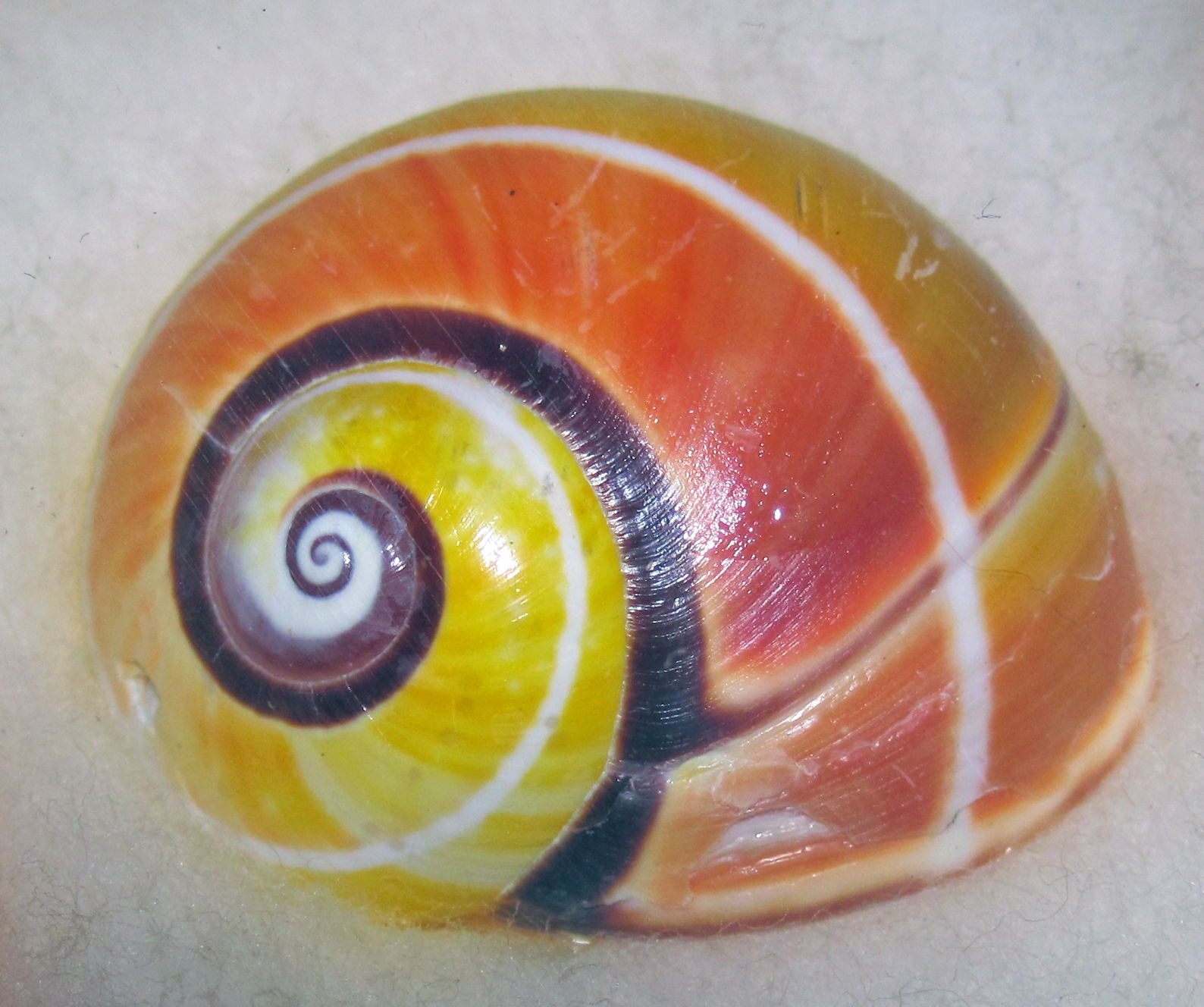

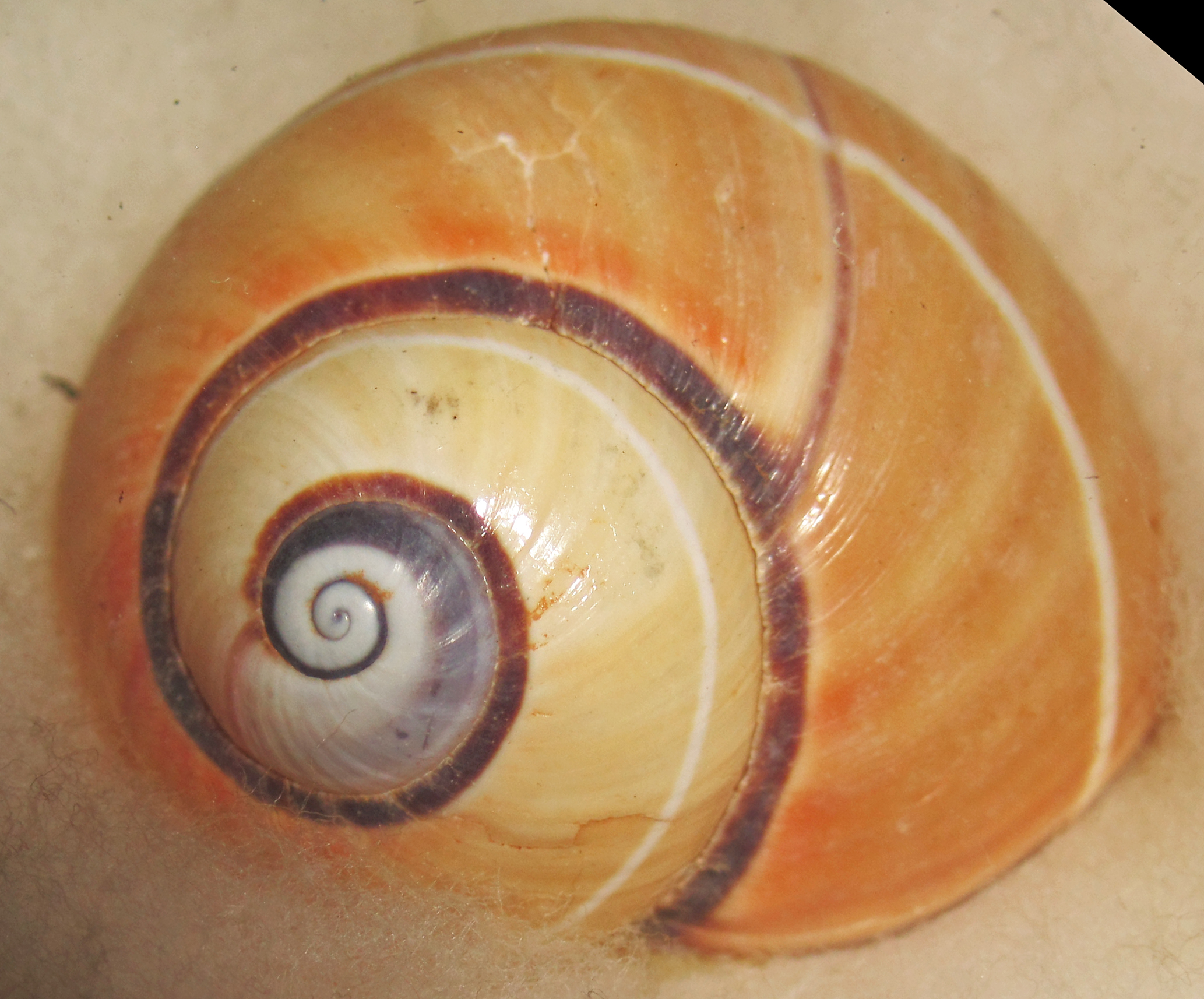

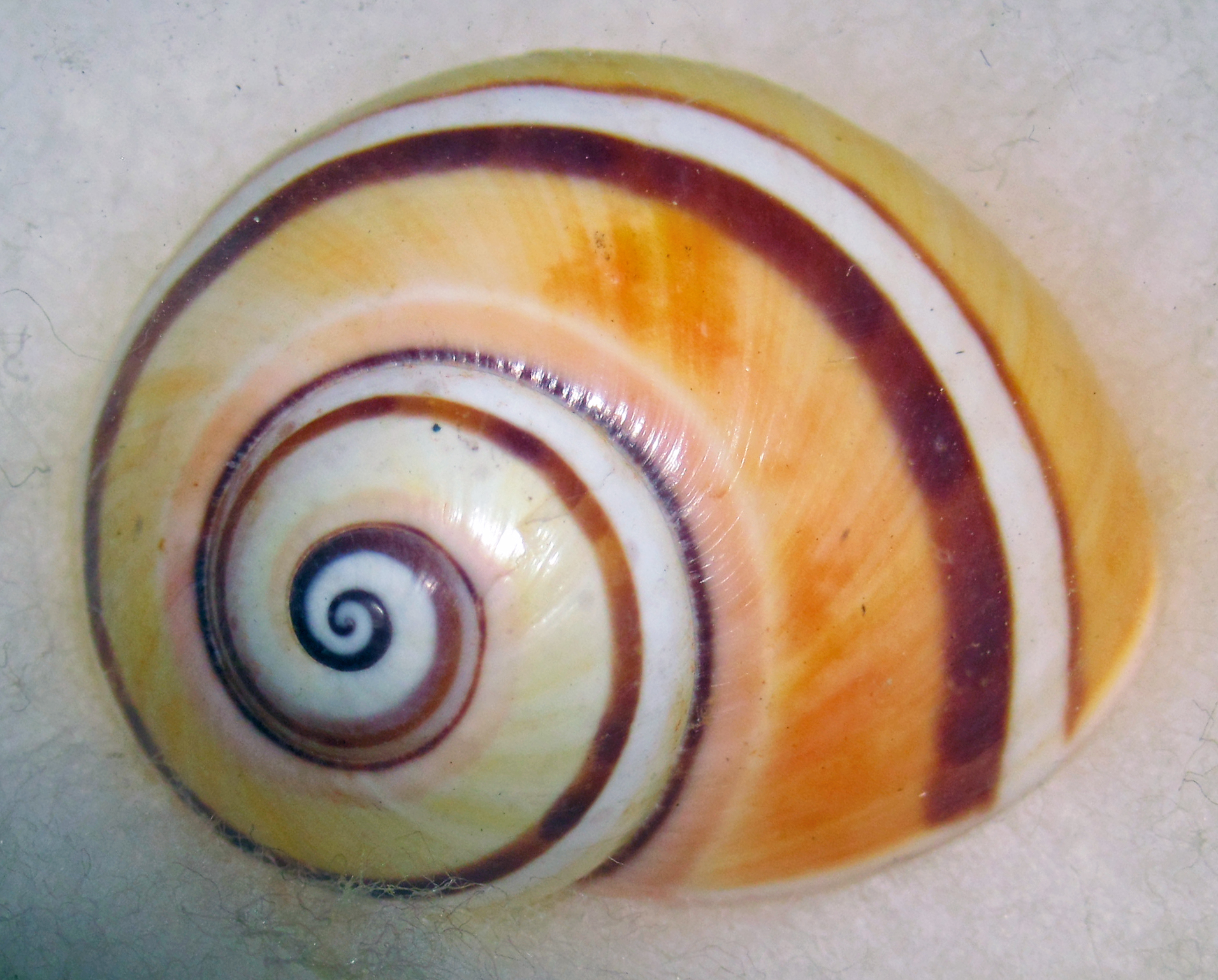

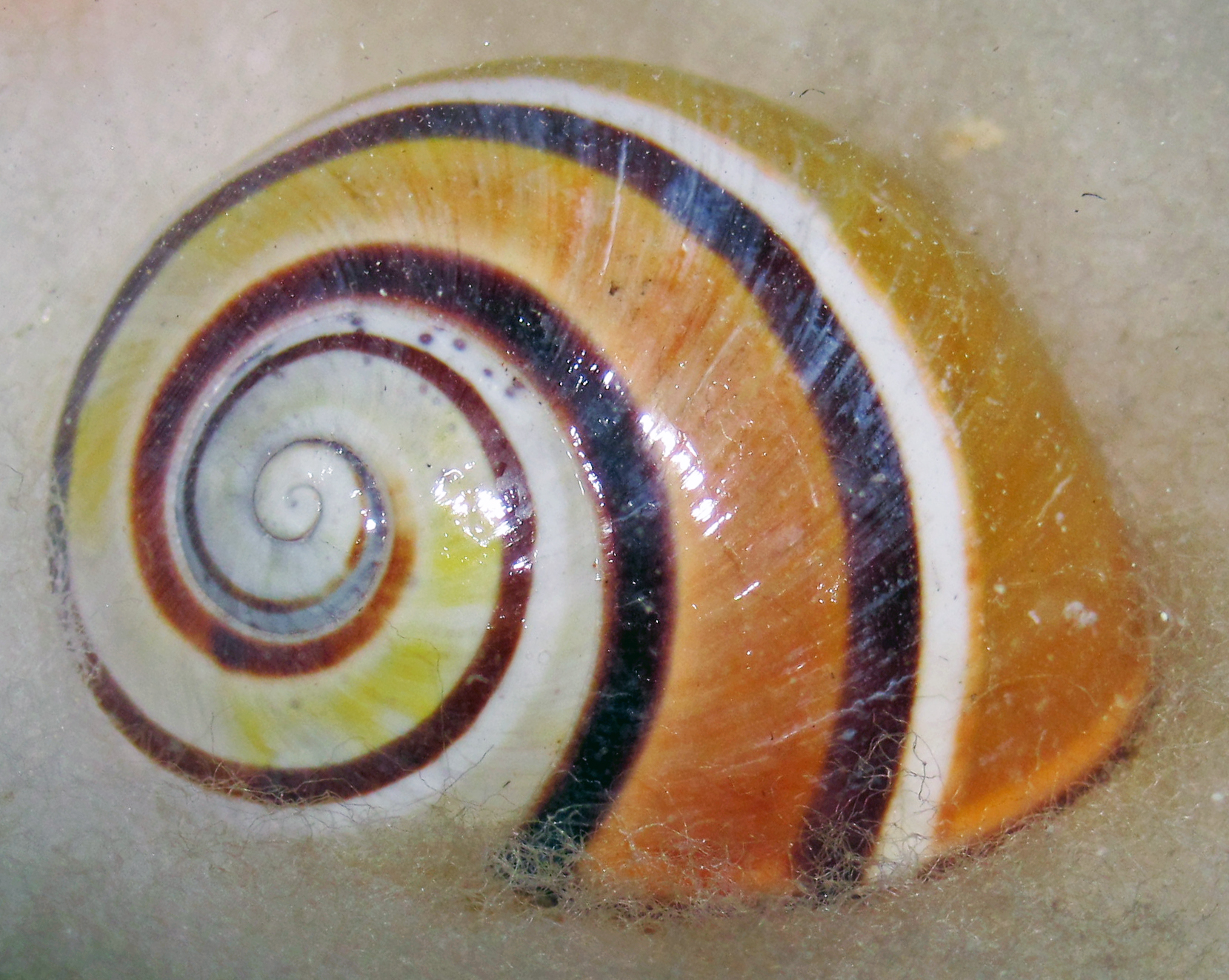

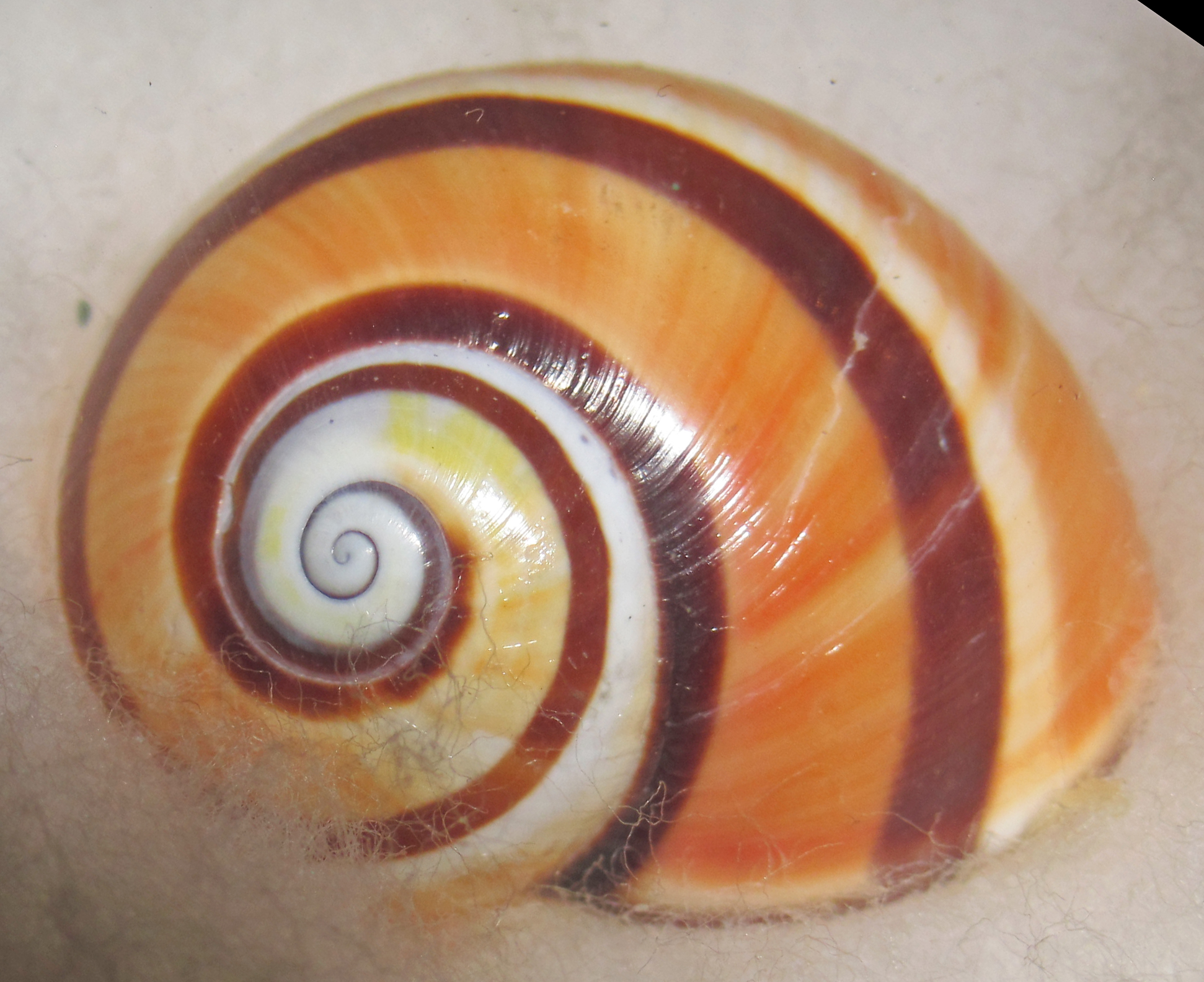

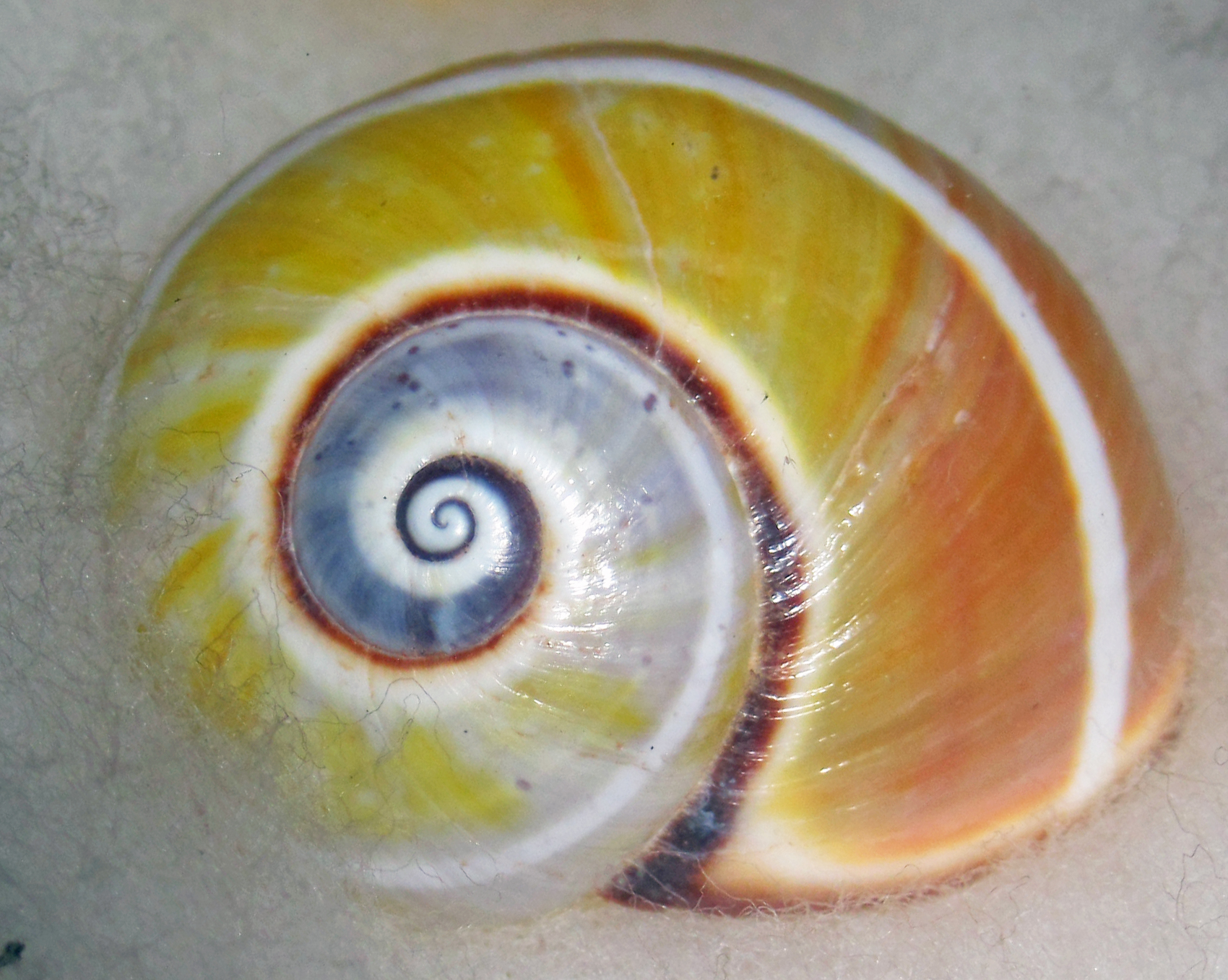

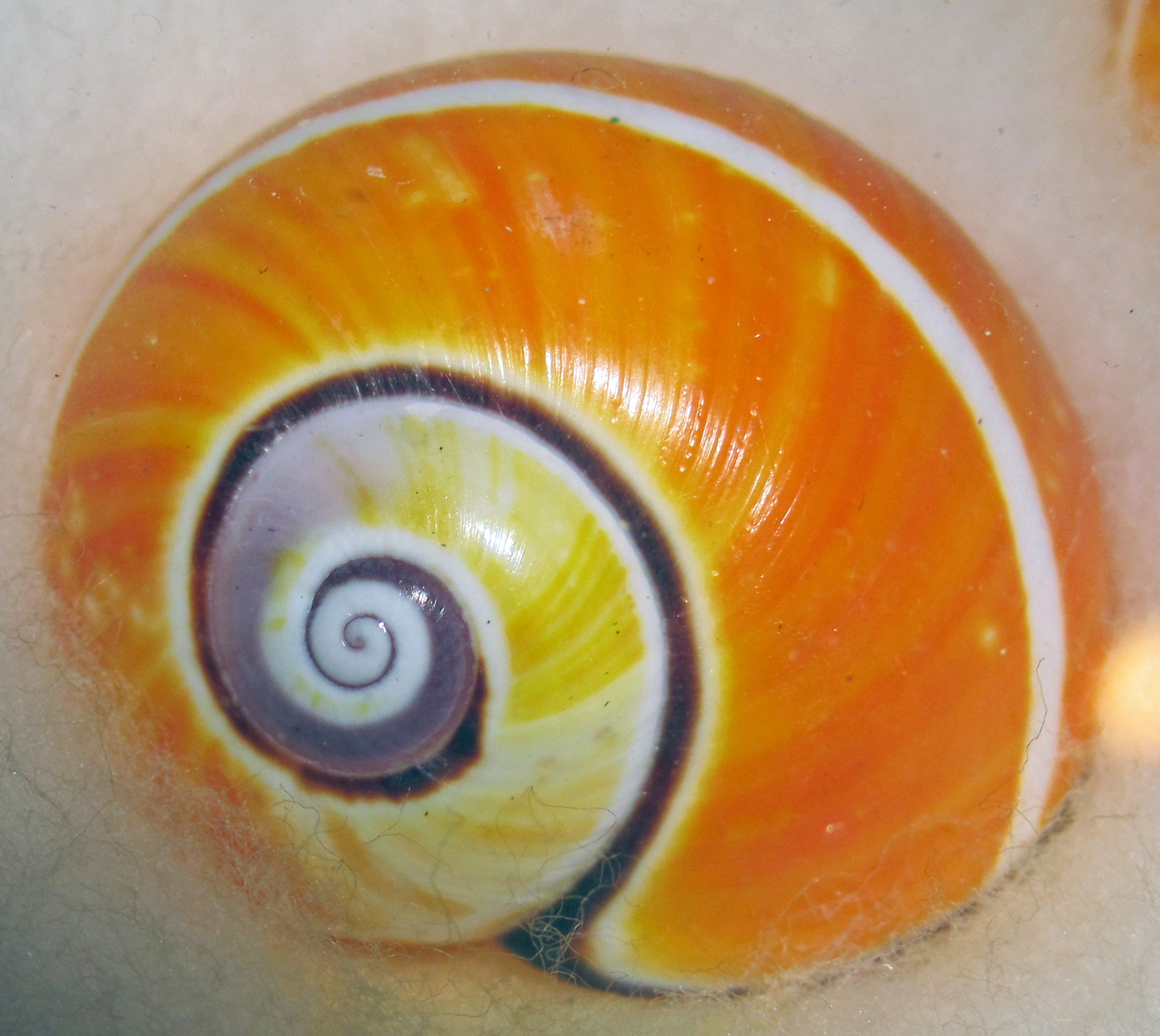

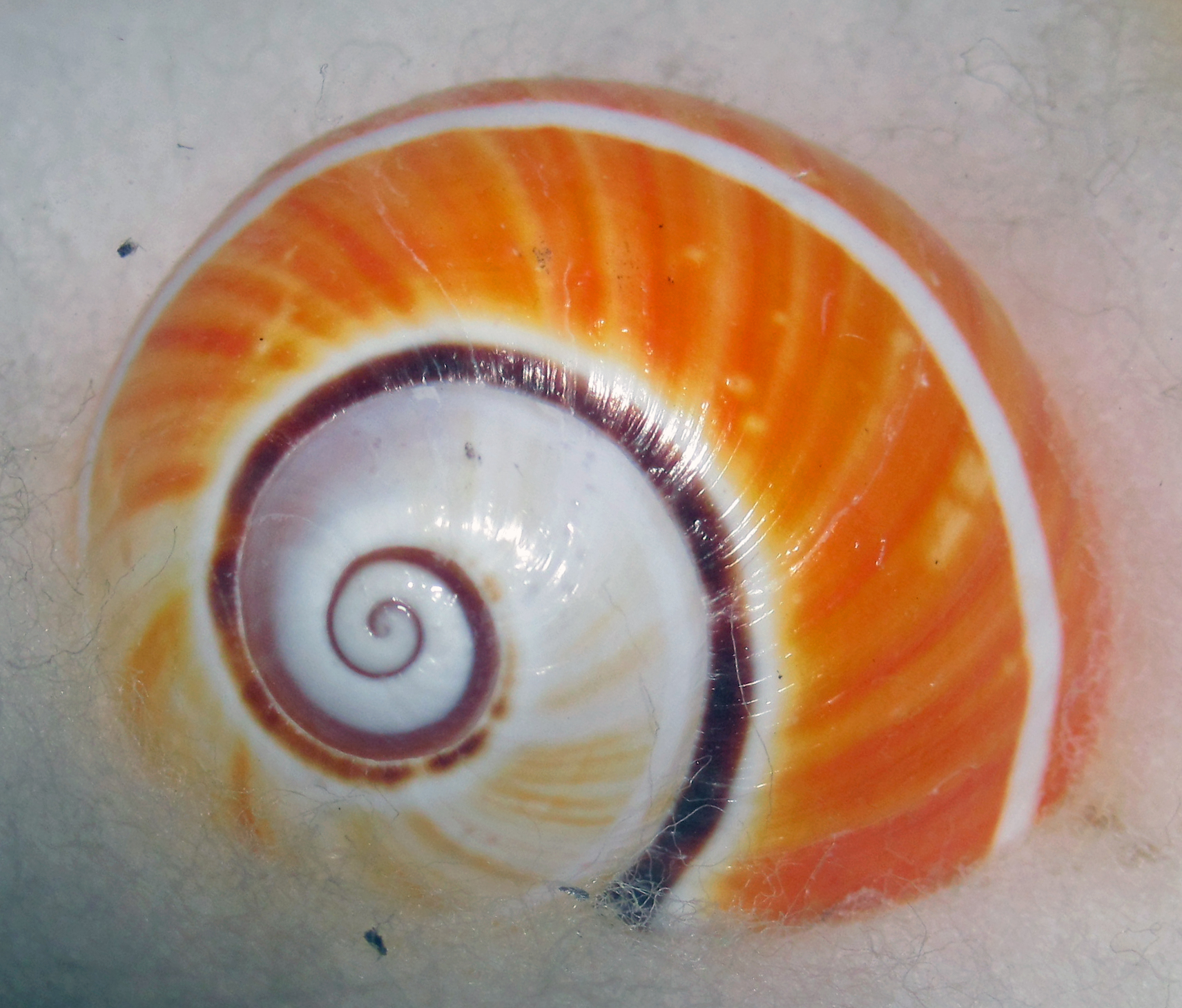

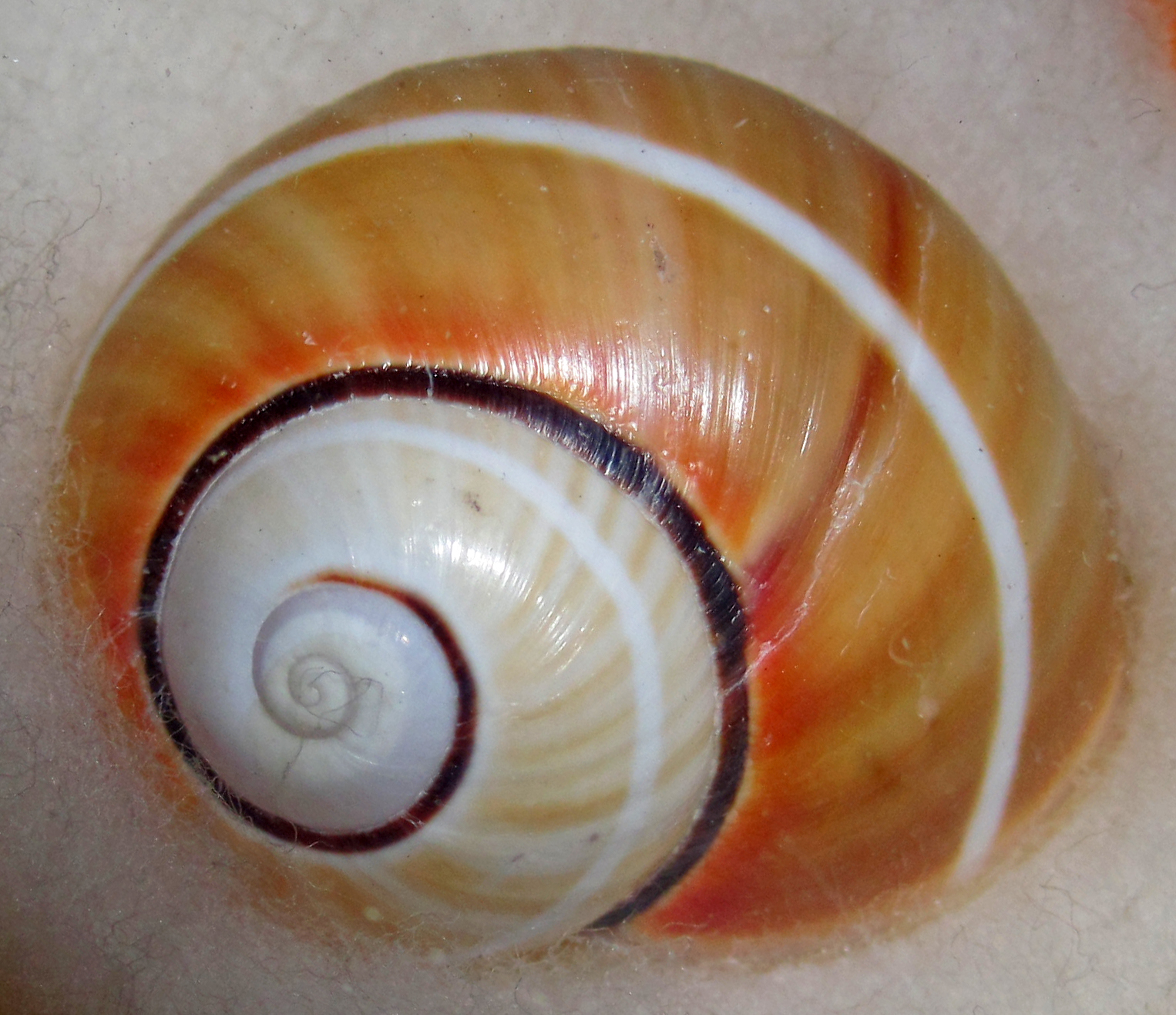

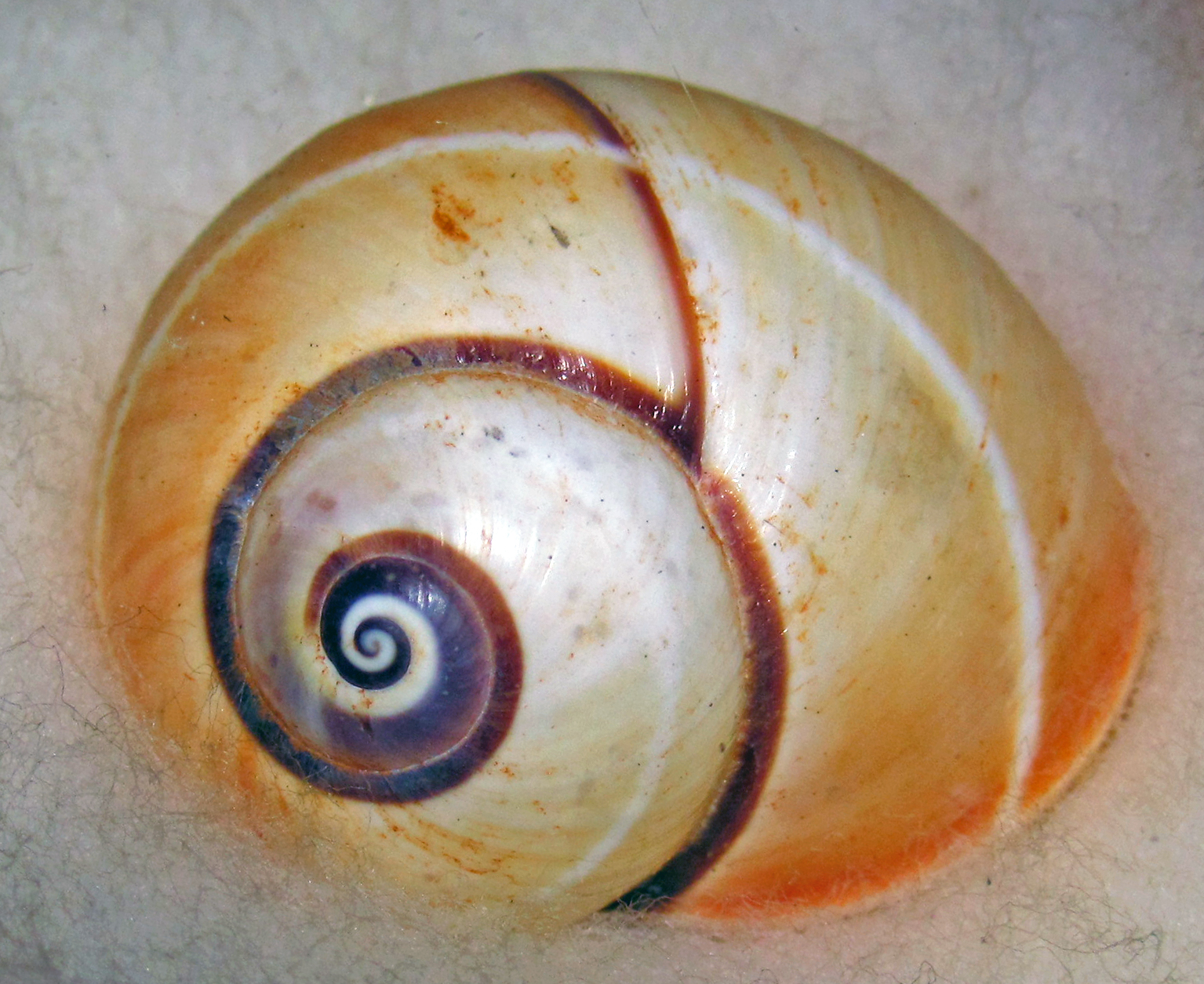

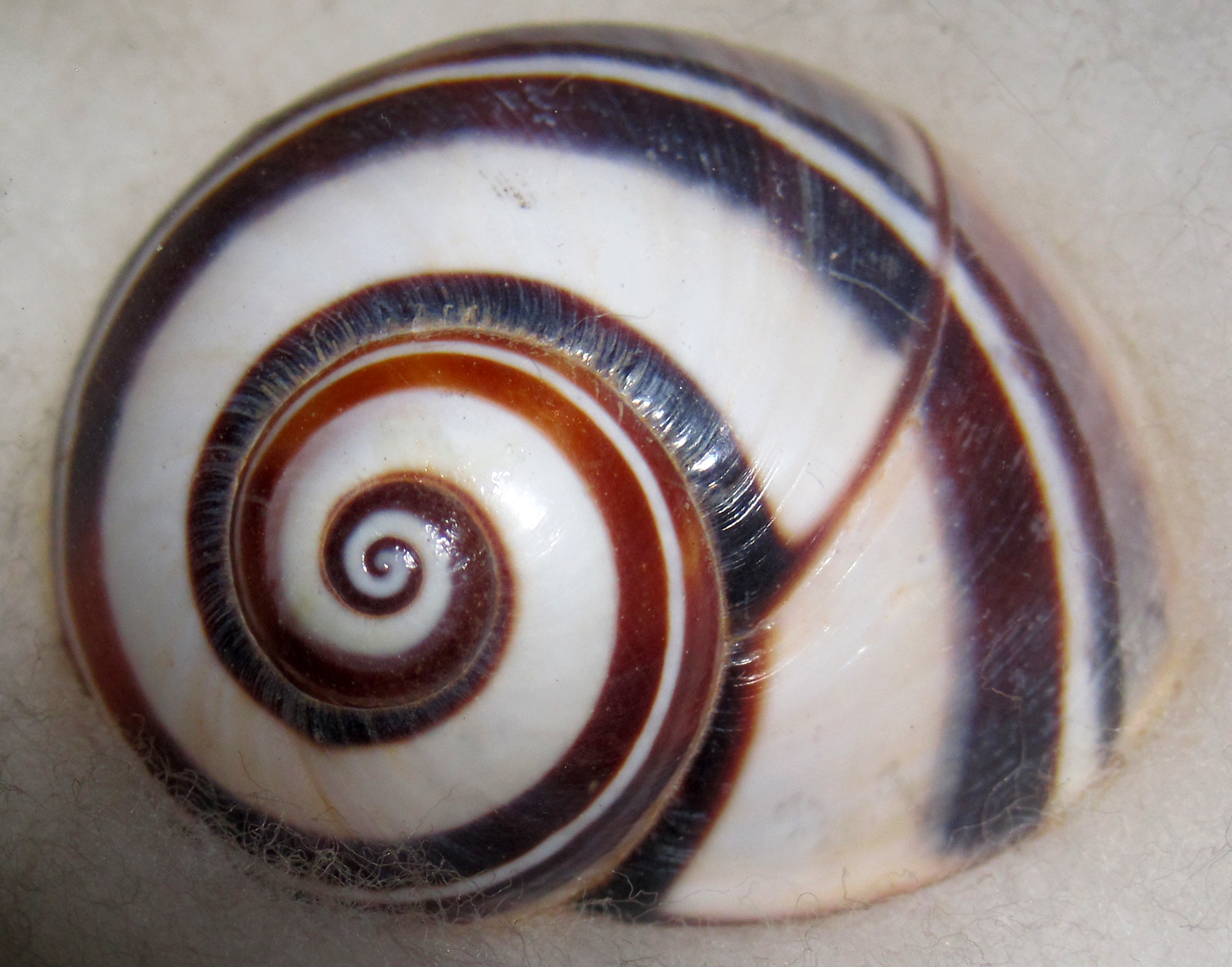

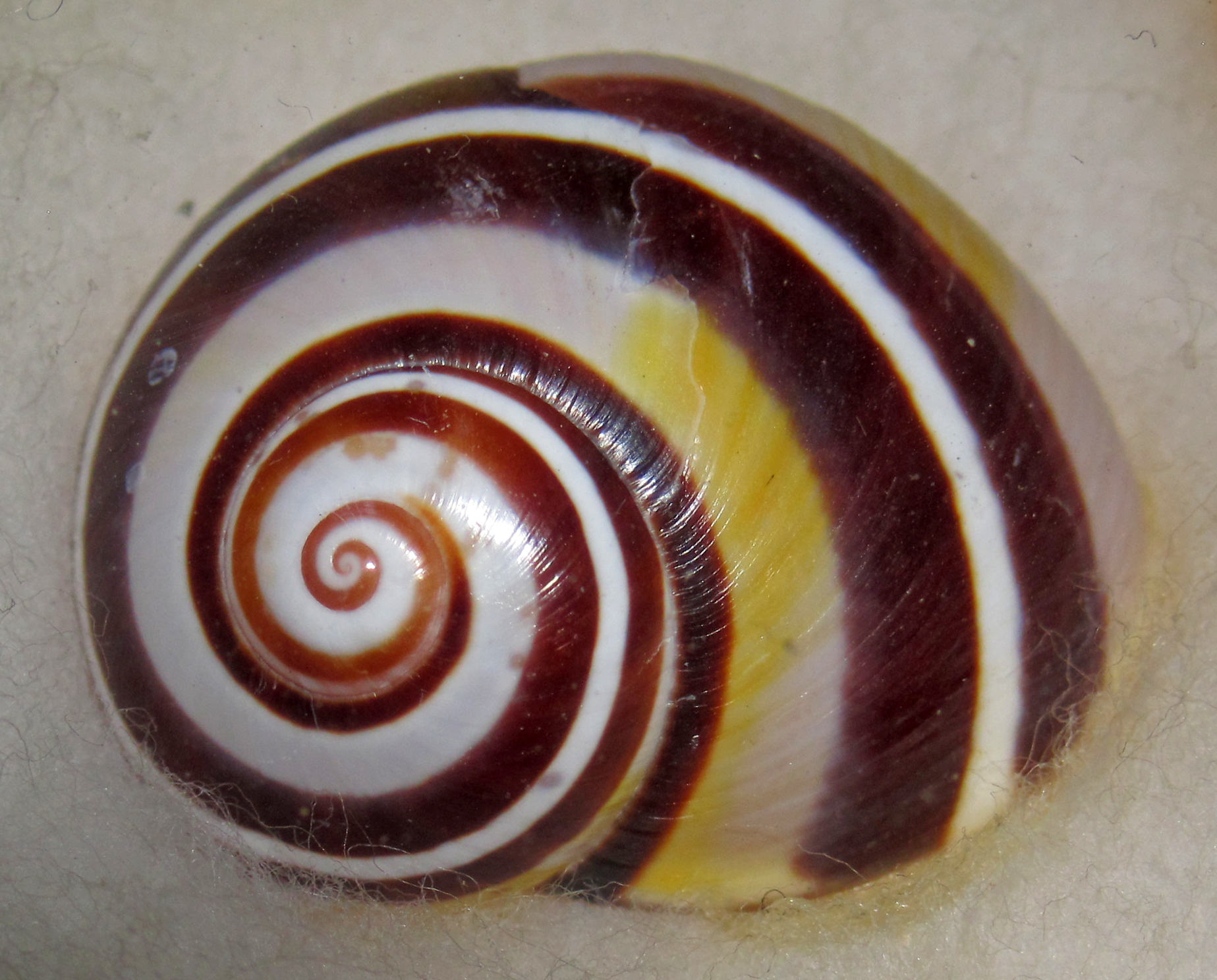

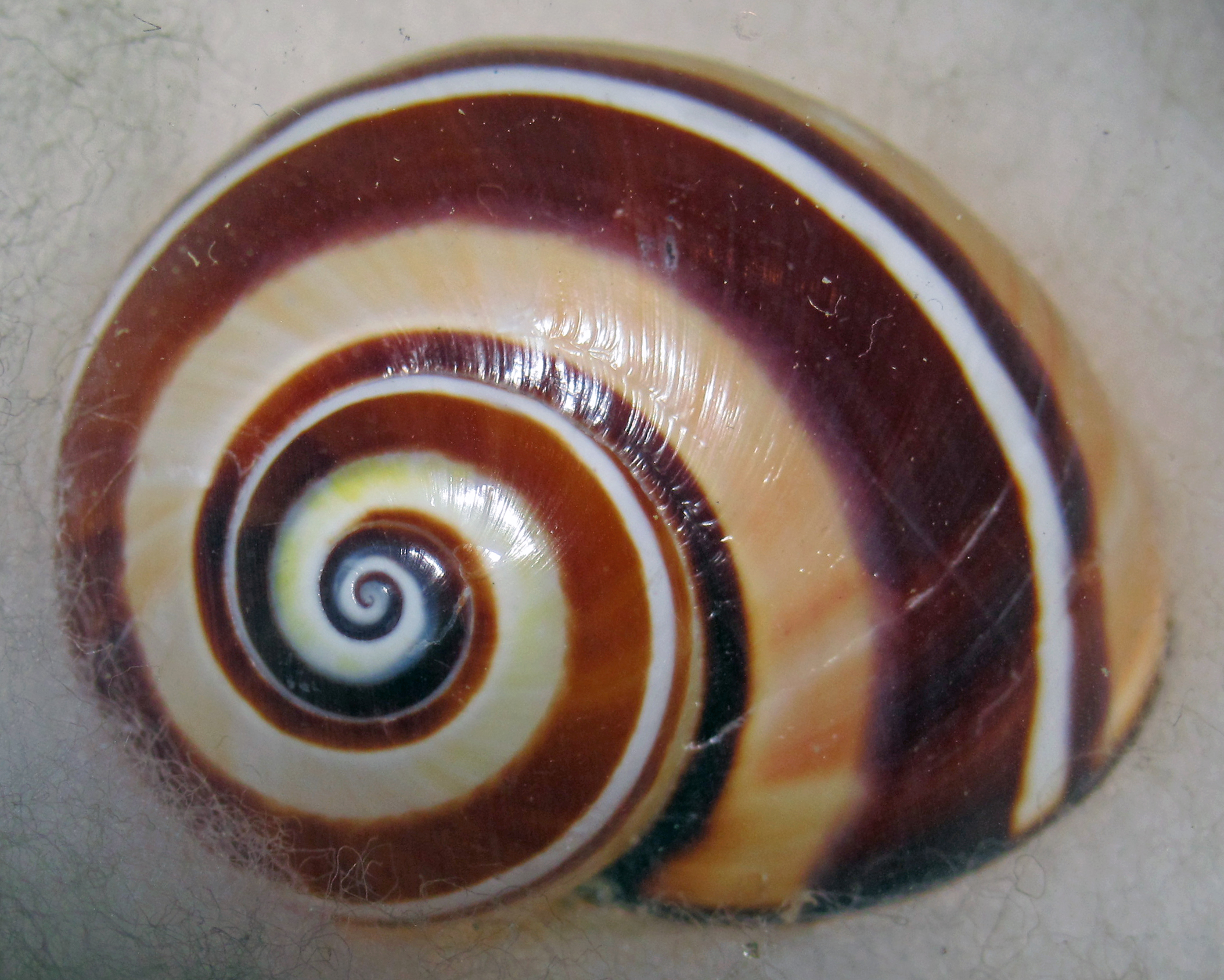

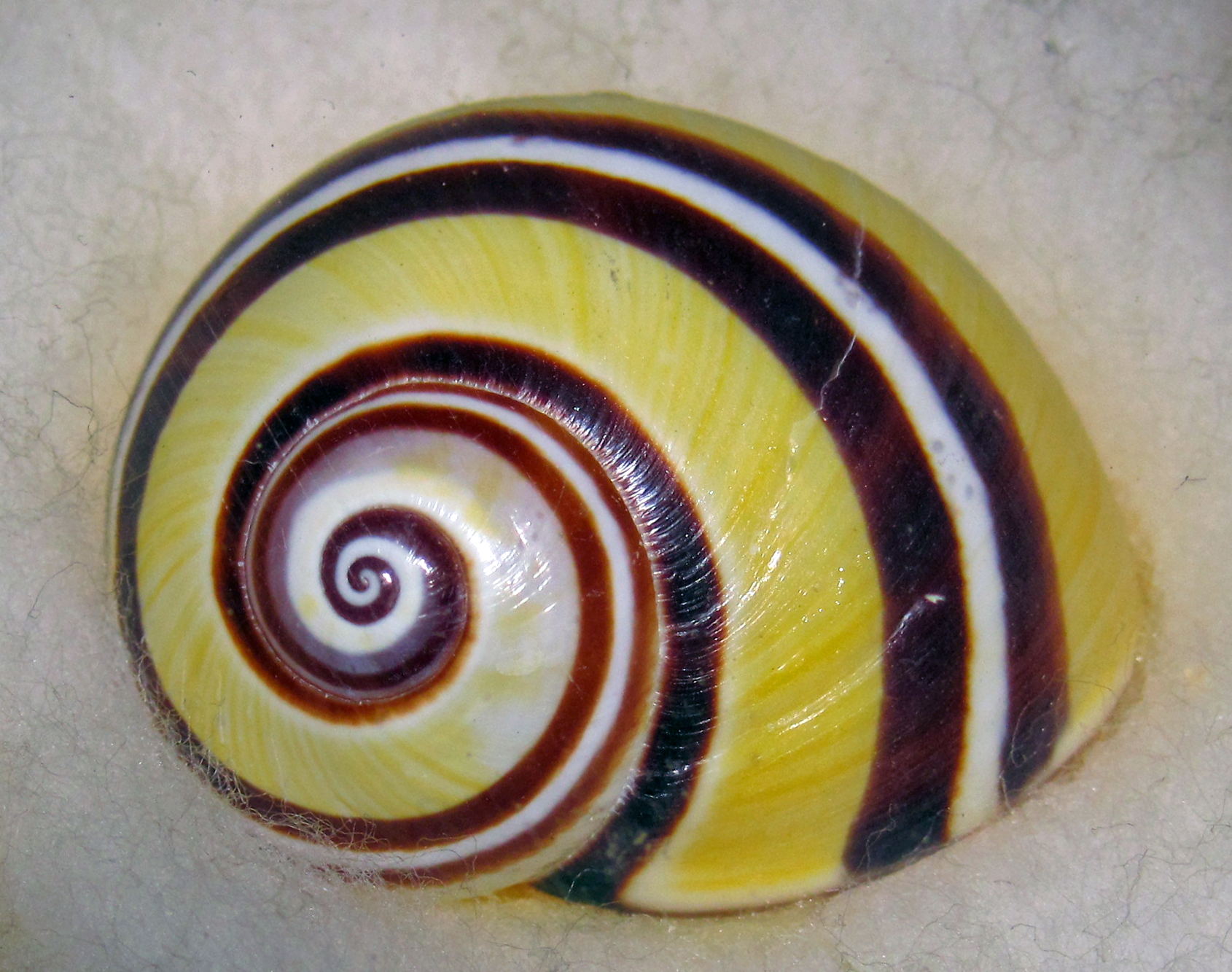

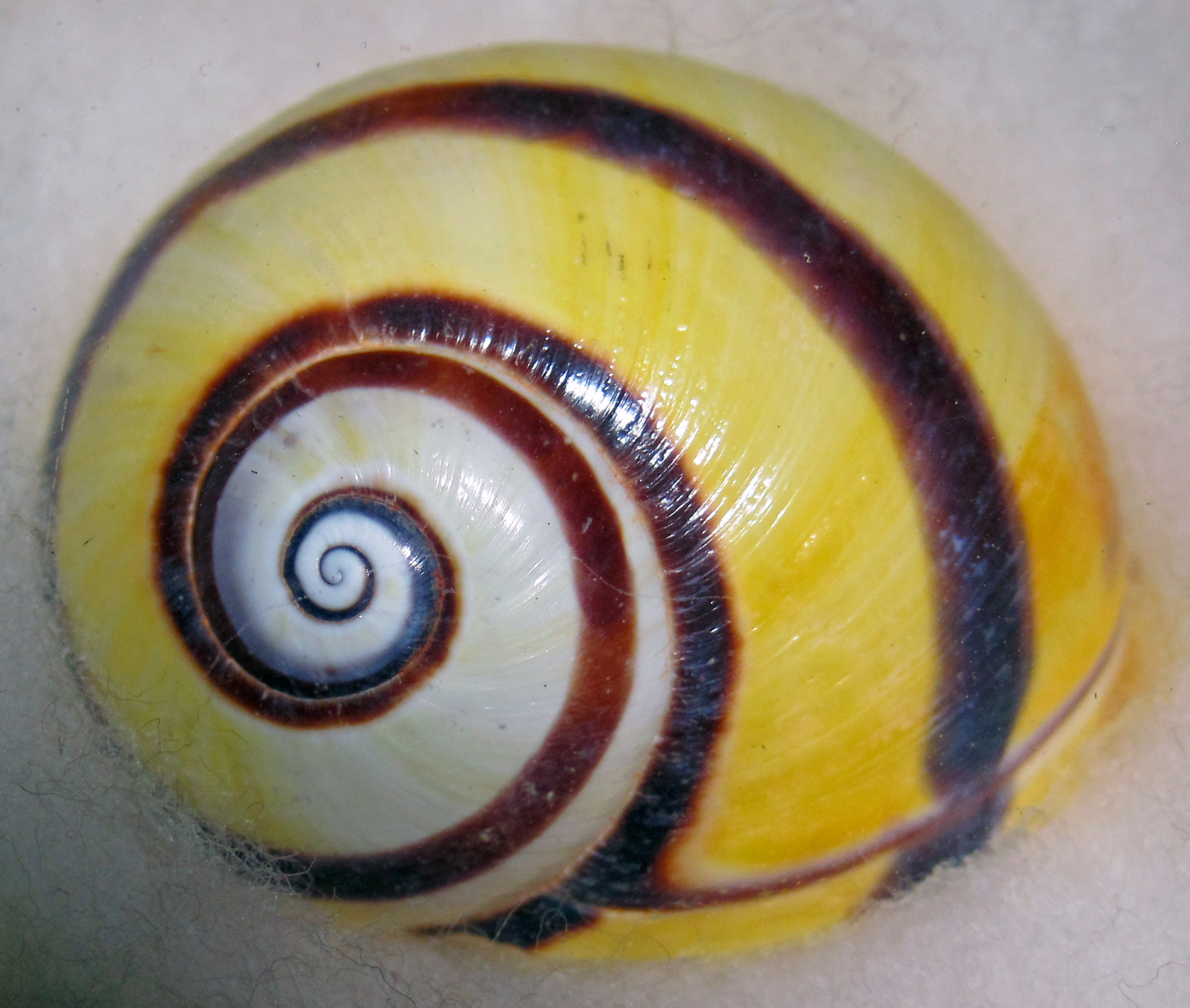

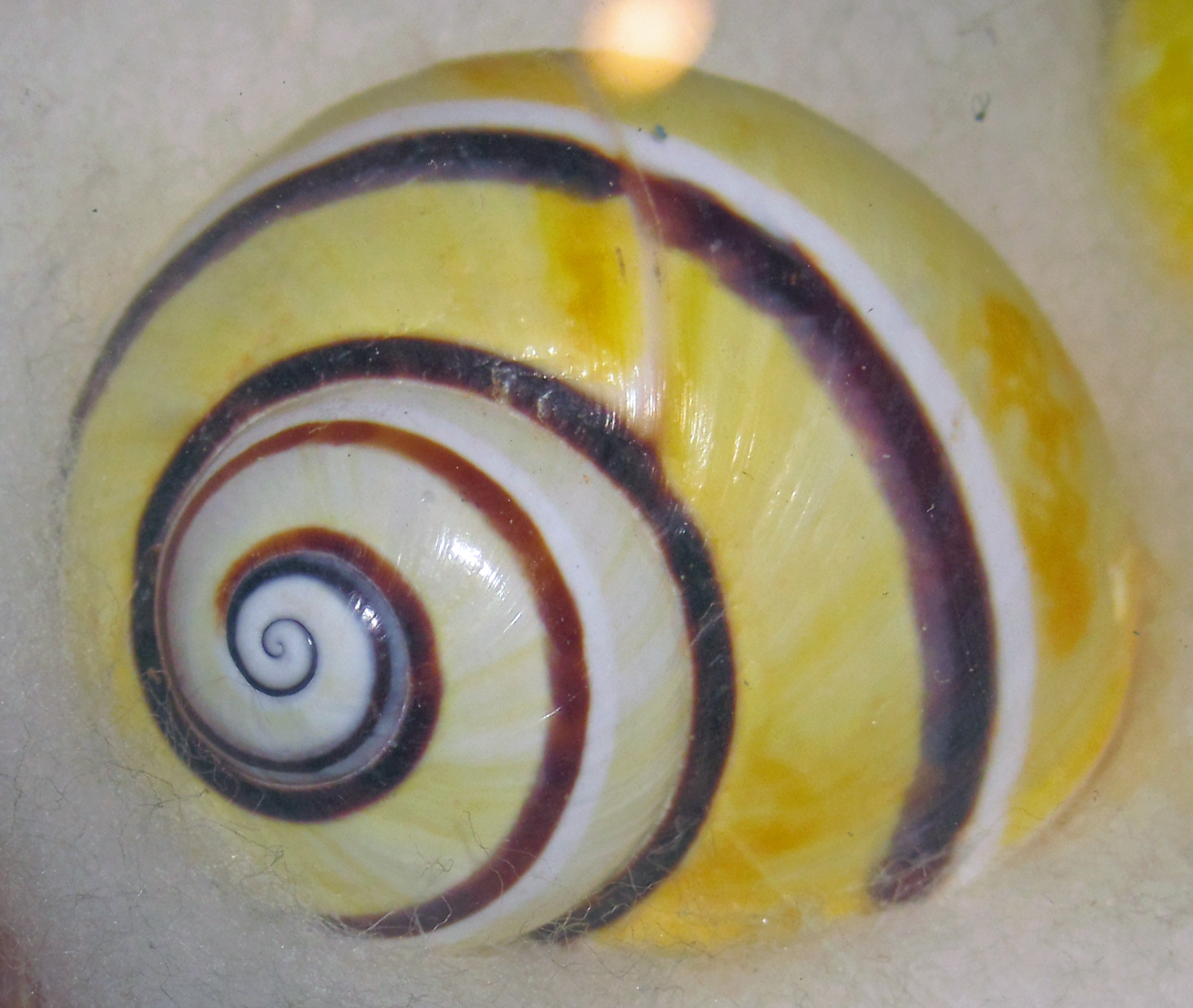

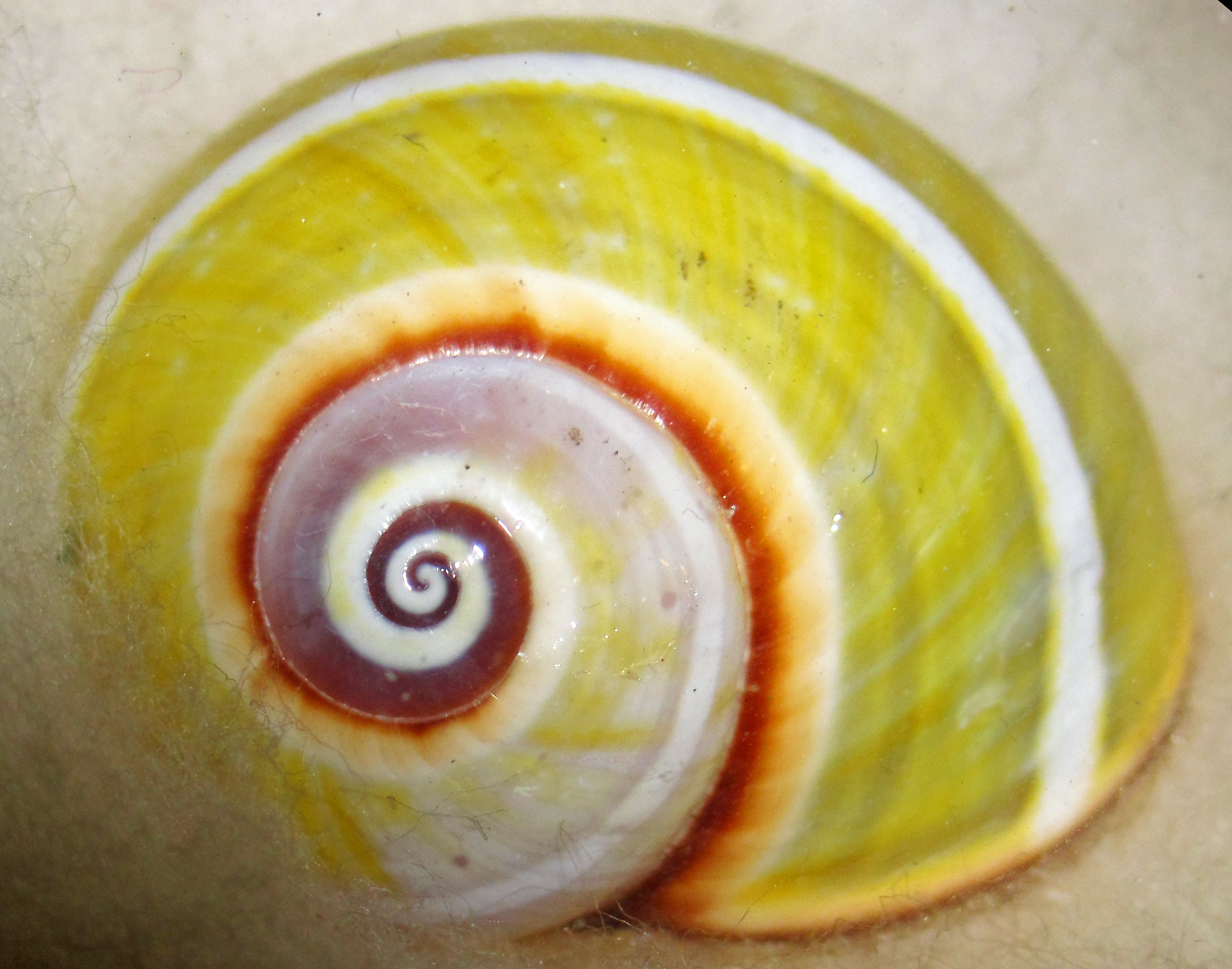

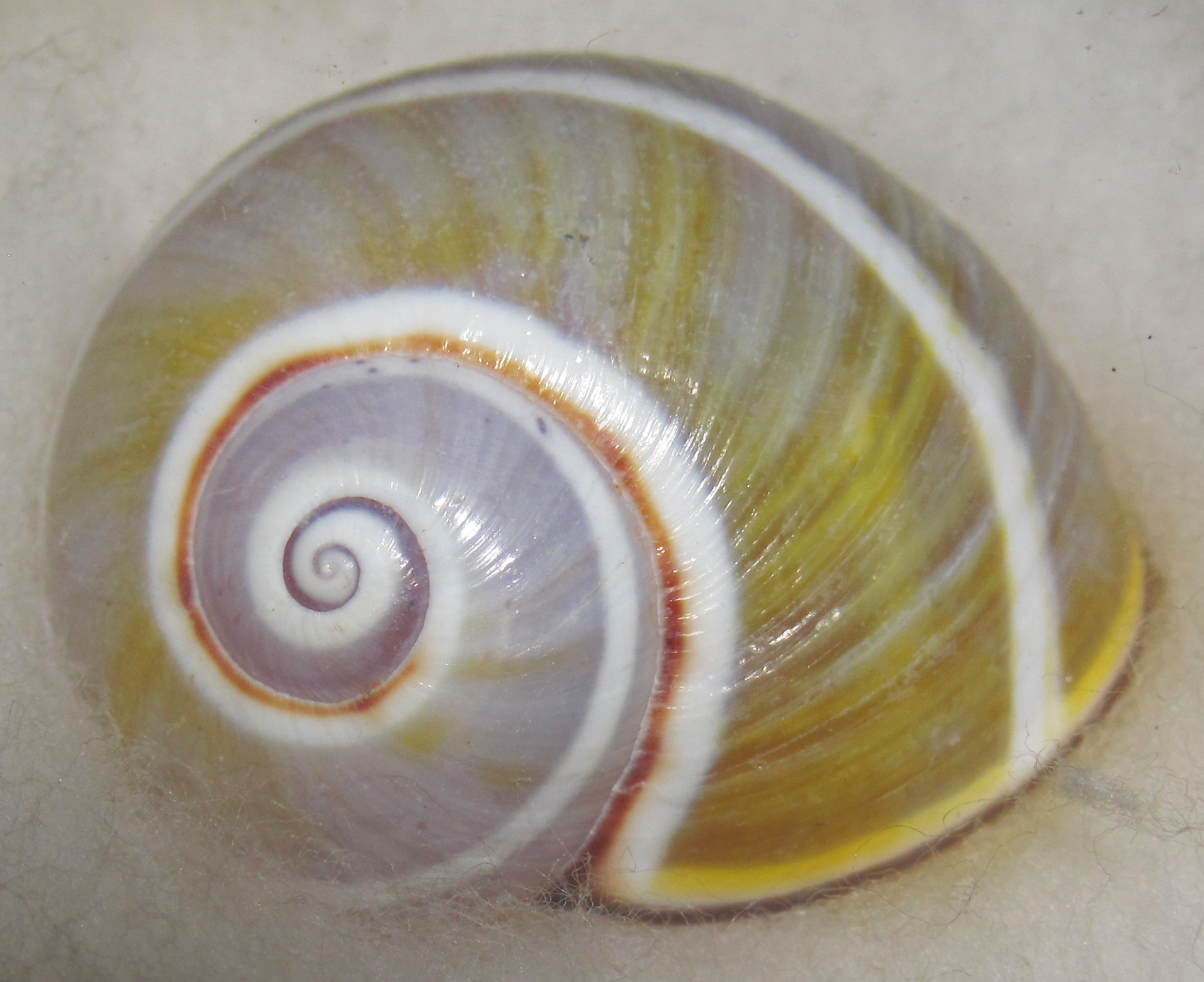

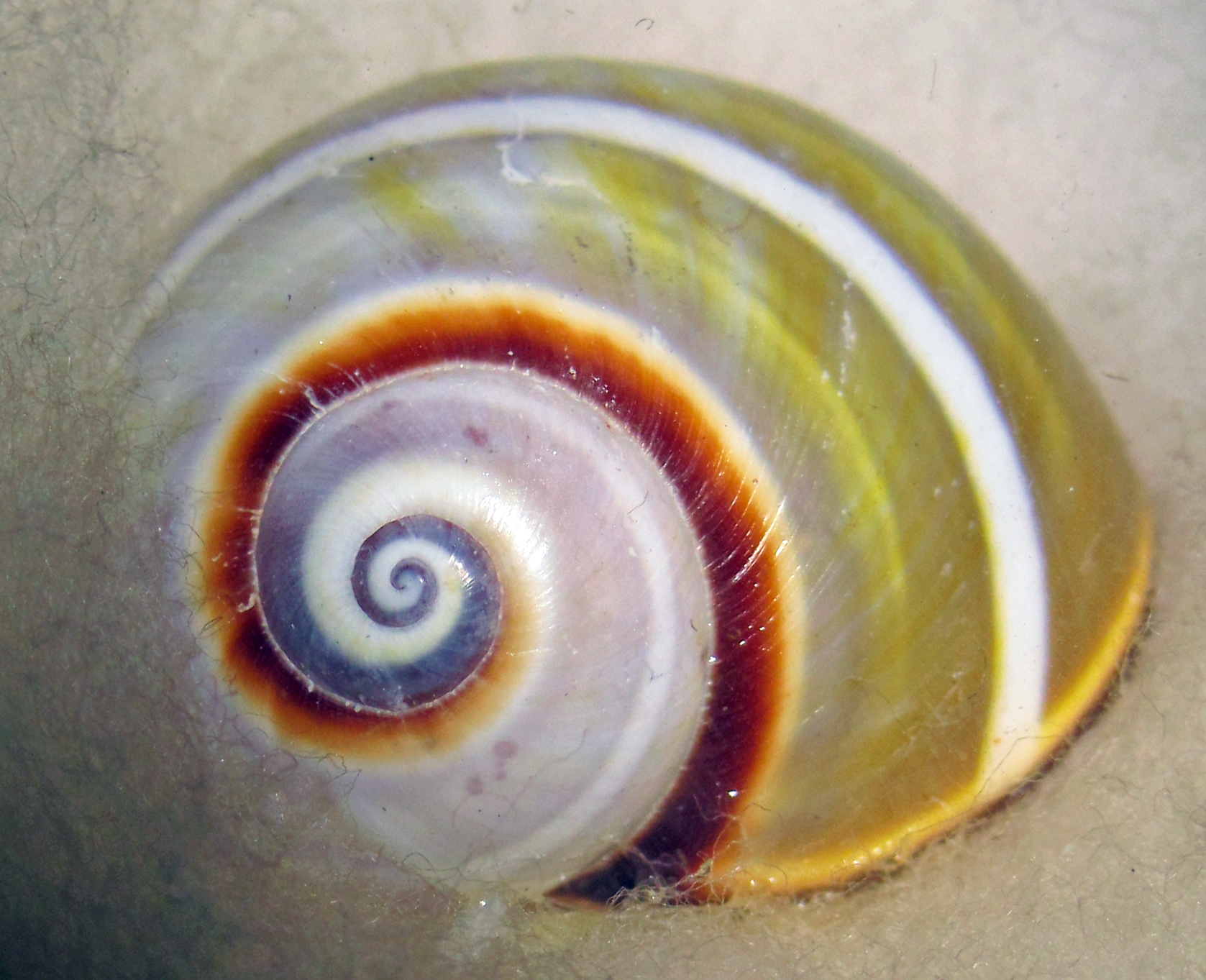

== Bibliography ==
- Fernandez, J.M., J.R. Martinez,1987. Polymita. Ministerio de Cultura, Editorial Cientifico-Tecnica, Habana, Cuba
- Parkinson, B., J. Hemmen and K. Groh, 1987. Tropical Landshells of the World. Weisbaden.
- Emilio Jorge Power. «Polymita picta». The Polymita Home Page.
- González Guillén A. (2014). "Polymita, the most beautiful land snail of the world". Carlos M. Estevez & Associates, Miami, 359 pp., ISBN 978-1-63068-516-4.
- Torre1950, "El Genero Polymita", Memorias de la Sociedad Cubana de Historia Natural "Felipe Poey", 20(1): 1-20, 11 color plates.
