= Euclastaria =

Scientific classification
- Kingdom: Animalia
- Phylum: Mollusca
- Class: Gastropoda
- Order: Stylommatophora
- Family: Cepolidae
- Genus: Euclastaria; Pilsbry, 1926

Genus of land snails

Euclastaria is a genus of gastropods belonging to the family Cepolidae.

The species of this genus are found in Central America.

Species:

- Euclastaria debilis (Pfeiffer, 1855)
- Euclastaria musicola (Shuttleworth, 1854)
