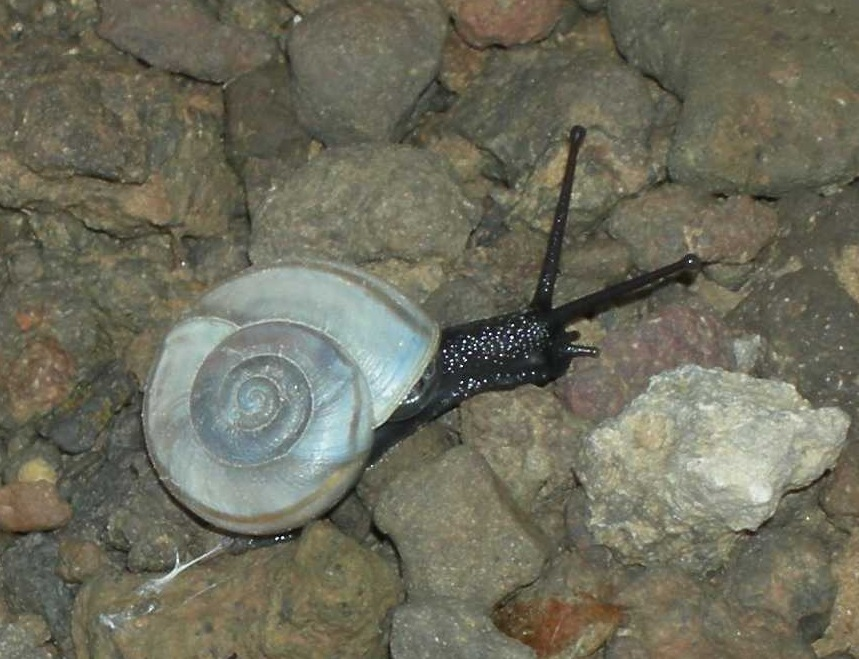

Conservation status
- Near Threatened (IUCN 2.3)

- Vulnerable (NatureServe)

Scientific classification
- Kingdom: Animalia
- Phylum: Mollusca
- Class: Gastropoda
- Order: Stylommatophora
- Family: Xanthonychidae
- Subfamily: Helminthoglyptinae
- Genus: Maricopella; Roth, 1996
- Species: M. allynsmithi

Binomial name
- Maricopella allynsmithi (Gregg & Miller, 1969)

Synonyms
- Sonorella allynsmithi Gregg & Miller, 1969

= Maricopella =

Monotypic snail genus

Maricopella is a monotypic genus of land snails in the subfamily Helminthoglyptinae. Its sole species, Maricopella allynsmithi, is native to Arizona in the United States.

This snail has a shiny, rounded, grayish to brownish white shell up to 1.9 centimeters wide. The body is dark gray to black with copper flecks along the skirt and tail tip. It is hermaphroditic, with both partners usually becoming fertilized during mating. The snail lays its eggs in moist conditions, and may retain its eggs until rain falls. The eggs have calcite crystals in their capsules, sometimes enough to form a shell around the egg. The snail consumes plant and fungal matter in the soil.

The snail lives on rocky mountain slopes, taking shelter in talus and rockslides. During the dry conditions common in its habitat, the snail seals its shell aperture to solid rock to avoid desiccation. The rock should be rich in calcium carbonate, which the snail uses to form its shell. It is associated with local plant species such as saguaro cactus (Carnegiea gigantea), yellow paloverde (Parkinsonia microphylla), brittlebush (Encelia farinosa), foxtail brome (Bromus madritensis), Natal grass (Melinis repens), creosote bush (Larrea tridentata), and Coulter's lupine (Lupinus sparsiflorus).

This species was described from a specimen collected in the city of Phoenix, Arizona. It occurs in the mountains of Maricopa County.
