= Coryda =

Scientific classification
- Kingdom: Animalia
- Phylum: Mollusca
- Class: Gastropoda
- Order: Stylommatophora
- Family: Cepolidae
- Genus: Coryda; Albers, 1850

Type species
- Helix alauda Férussac, 1821

Synonyms
- Cepolis (Coryda) Albers, 1850 (superseded combination); Helix (Coryda) Albers, 1850 (original rank); Histrio L. Pfeiffer, 1854

Genus of gastropods

Coryda is a genus of gastropods belonging to the family Cepolidae.

The species of this genus are found in Central America.

Species:

- Coryda alauda (Férussac, 1821)
- Coryda beatensis (Bartsch, 1932)
- Coryda caraballoi Espinosa, Herrera-Uría & Ortea, 2017
- Coryda circumornata (Férussac, 1821)
- Coryda devexa (Pilsbry, 1933)
- Coryda dominicana Clench, 1962
- Coryda edentula Clench, 1962
- Coryda hebe (Deshayes, 1850)
- Coryda lindoni (Pfeiffer, 1847)
- † Coryda miocenica (Pilsbry & Olsson, 1954)
- Coryda monodonta (I. Lea, 1834)
- Coryda montana Clench, 1962
- † Coryda propappa (Pilsbry & Olsson, 1954)
- Coryda samana Clench, 1962
- Coryda thierryi Espinosa, Herrera-Uría & Ortea, 2017
