= Bellacepolis =

Scientific classification
- Kingdom: Animalia
- Phylum: Mollusca
- Class: Gastropoda
- Order: Stylommatophora
- Family: Cepolidae
- Genus: Bellacepolis; Pilsbry, 1943

Genus of land snails

Bellacepolis is a genus of gastropods belonging to the family Cepolidae.

Species:

- Bellacepolis squamosa (Férussac, 1821)
