= Levicepolis =

Scientific classification
- Kingdom: Animalia
- Phylum: Mollusca
- Class: Gastropoda
- Order: Stylommatophora
- Family: Cepolidae
- Genus: Levicepolis; Baker, 1943

Genus of land snails

Levicepolis is a genus of gastropods belonging to the family Cepolidae.

Species:

- Levicepolis nemoralina (Petit de la Saussaye, 1836)
- Levicepolis phaedra (Pfeiffer, 1854)
