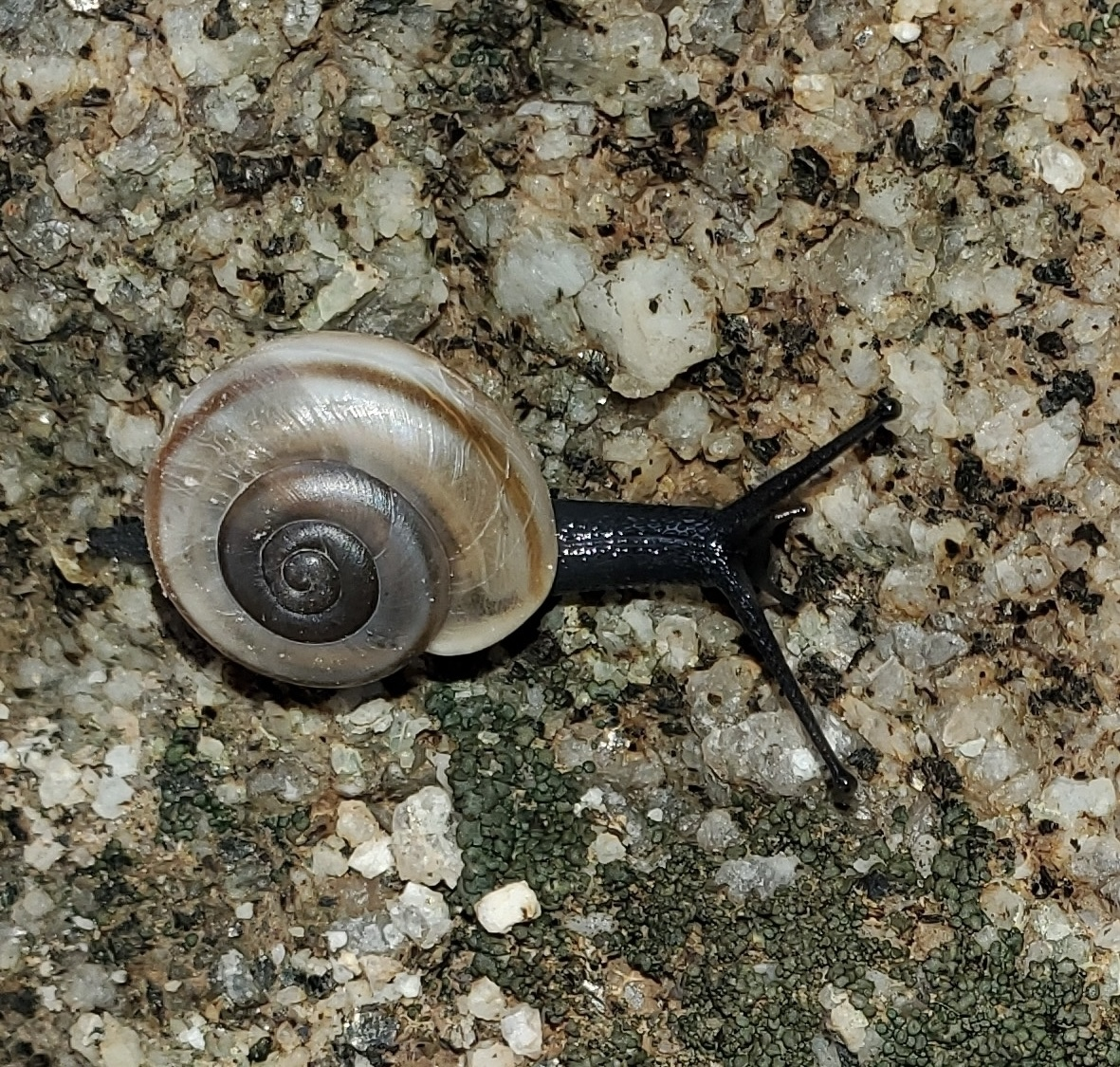

Conservation status
- Critically Imperiled (NatureServe)

Scientific classification
- Kingdom: Animalia
- Phylum: Mollusca
- Class: Gastropoda
- Order: Stylommatophora
- Family: Xanthonychidae
- Genus: Sonorelix
- Species: S. borregoensis

Binomial name
- Sonorelix borregoensis S.S. Berry, 1929

Synonyms
- Micrarionta borregoensis

= Sonorelix borregoensis =

Species of mollusk

Sonorelix borregoensis, also known as the Borrego desertsnail, is a species of terrestrial snail.

This species was originally described, as Micrarionta borregoensis, by S. Stillman Berry in 1929, from a specimen collected in Palm Canyon, in what is now Anza-Borrego Desert State Park, San Diego County, California, United States. Berry reclassified it in the new genus Sonorelix in 1943.

Subspecies

- Sonorelix borregoensis borregoensis (S. S. Berry, 1929)
- Sonorelix borregoensis ora (Willett, 1929)
