= Eurycampta =

Scientific classification
- Kingdom: Animalia
- Phylum: Mollusca
- Class: Gastropoda
- Order: Stylommatophora
- Family: Cepolidae
- Genus: Eurycampta von Martens, 1860

Genus of land snails

Eurycampta is a genus of gastropods belonging to the family Cepolidae.

The species of this genus are found in Central America.

== Species ==
- Eurycampta arctistria (Pfeiffer, 1845)

Species brought into synonymy

- Eurycampta hidalgonis Döring, 1875: synonym of Epiphragmophora trenquelleonis (Pfeiffer, 1851) (junior synonym)
