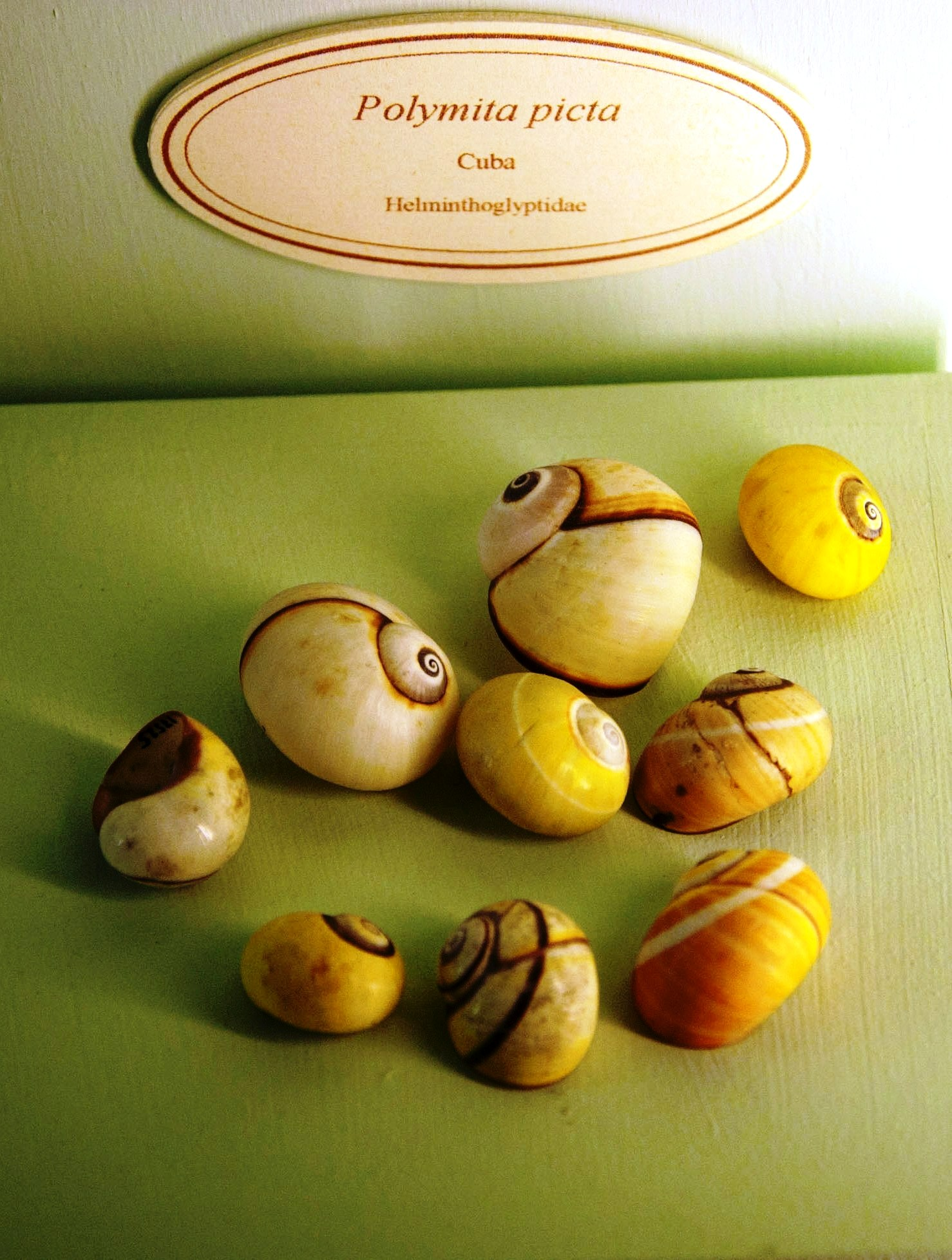
- A group of shells of Polymita picta

Conservation status
- CITES Appendix I

Scientific classification
- Kingdom: Animalia
- Phylum: Mollusca
- Class: Gastropoda
- Order: Stylommatophora
- Family: Helminthoglyptidae
- Genus: Polymita; Beck, 1837

= Polymita =

Genus of gastropods

Polymita is a genus of large, air-breathing land snails in the family Cepolidae.

These snails are endemic to Cuba. Their shells are prized by collectors, and in recent years, there have been efforts to protect local populations from overcollection.

== Anatomy ==
Polymita creates and uses love darts as part of its mating behavior.

== Species ==
There are six recognized species within the genus Polymita:

- Polymita muscarum (Lea, 1834)
- Polymita picta (Born, 1778) – type species
- Polymita sulphurosa (Morelet, 1849)
- †Polymita texana B. Roth, 1984
- Polymita venusta (Gmelin, 1786)
- Polymita versicolor (Born, 1778)

One species has an uncertain status:

- Polymita brocheri (Gutiérrez in Pfeiffer, 1864)
