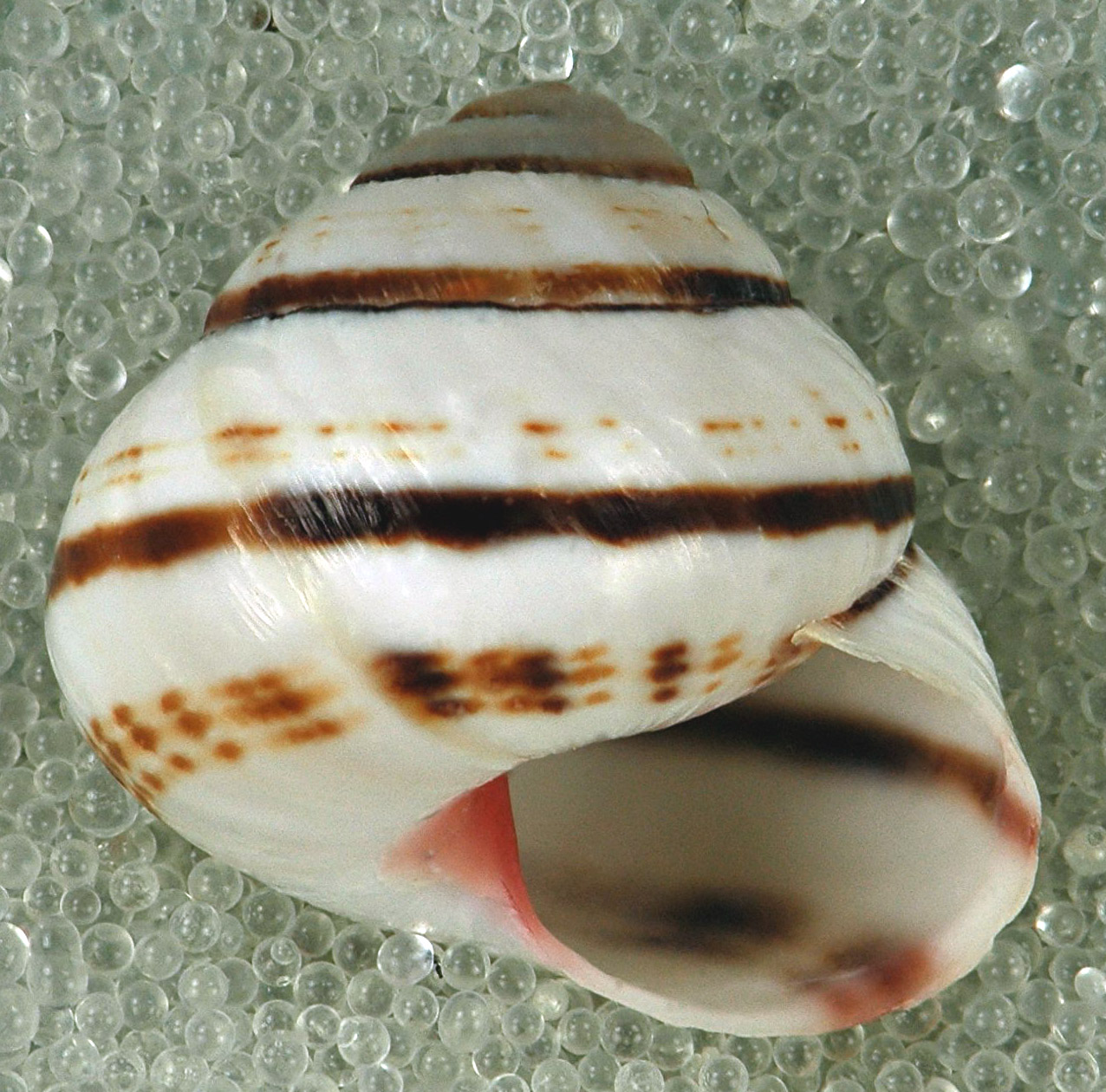
- Hemitrochus varians shell

Scientific classification
- Kingdom: Animalia
- Phylum: Mollusca
- Class: Gastropoda
- Order: Stylommatophora
- Family: Cepolidae
- Genus: Hemitrochus; Swainson, 1840

Synonyms
- Cepolis (Hemitrochus) Swainson, 1840; Geotrochus (Hemitrochus) Swainson, 1840; Helix (Hemitrochus) Swainson, 1840; Helix (Phaedra) Albers, 1850; Phaedra Albers, 1850; Polytaenia von Martens, 1860

= Hemitrochus =

Genus of gastropods

Hemitrochus is a genus of land snails in the family Cepolidae.

== Species ==
The genus Hemitrochus includes the following species:

- Hemitrochus agassizii (Dall, 1905)
- Hemitrochus alleni Aguayo & Jaume, 1957
- Hemitrochus amplecta (Pfeiffer, 1860)
- Hemitrochus anguliferus (von Martens, 1877)
- Hemitrochus beattiei Aguayo & Jaume, 1957
- Hemitrochus bowdenensis Goodfriend, 1992
- Hemitrochus cerosa Clench & Aguayo, 1937
- Hemitrochus cesticulus (Pfeiffer, 1858)
- Hemitrochus clenchi Turner, 1958
- Hemitrochus comtus (Pfeiffer, 1857)
- Hemitrochus constatior (Weinland, 1880)
- Hemitrochus darlingtoni Clench, 1962
- Hemitrochus exumana (Dall, 1905)
- Hemitrochus fuscolabiatus (Poey, 1858)
- Hemitrochus gallopavonis (Pfeiffer, 1842)
- Hemitrochus garciana Clench & Aguayo, 1953
- Hemitrochus gilvus (Férussac, 1821)
- Hemitrochus graminicola (Adams 1849)
- Hemitrochus hendersoni Aguayo & Jaume, 1957
- Hemitrochus howardi Clench, 1962
- Hemitrochus lewisiana (Pilsbry, 1942)
- Hemitrochus lucipeta (Poey, 1854)
- Hemitrochus maculifera (Poey, 1858)
- Hemitrochus maisiana Aguayo & Jaume, 1954
- Hemitrochus milleri (Pfeiffer, 1867)
- Hemitrochus morbidus (Morelet, 1849)
- Hemitrochus pseudogilva (de la Torre, 1939)
- Hemitrochus riveroi Turner, 1958
- Hemitrochus rufoapicata (Poey, 1858)
- Hemitrochus sauvallei (Pfeiffer, 1866)
- Hemitrochus streatori (Pilsbry, 1889)
- Hemitrochus tephritis (Morelet, 1849)
- Hemitrochus troscheli (Pfeiffer, 1846)
- Hemitrochus varians (Menke, 1829)

Species formerly placed in this genus include:

- Hemitrochus boriquenae (Baker, 1940) – now accepted as Cepolis boriquenae Baker, 1940
- Hemitrochus dermatinus (Shuttleworth, 1854) – now accepted as Levicepolis dermatina (Shuttleworth, 1854)
- Hemitrochus nemoralina (Petit de la Saussaye, 1836) – now accepted as Levicepolis nemoralina (Petit de la Saussaye, 1836)
