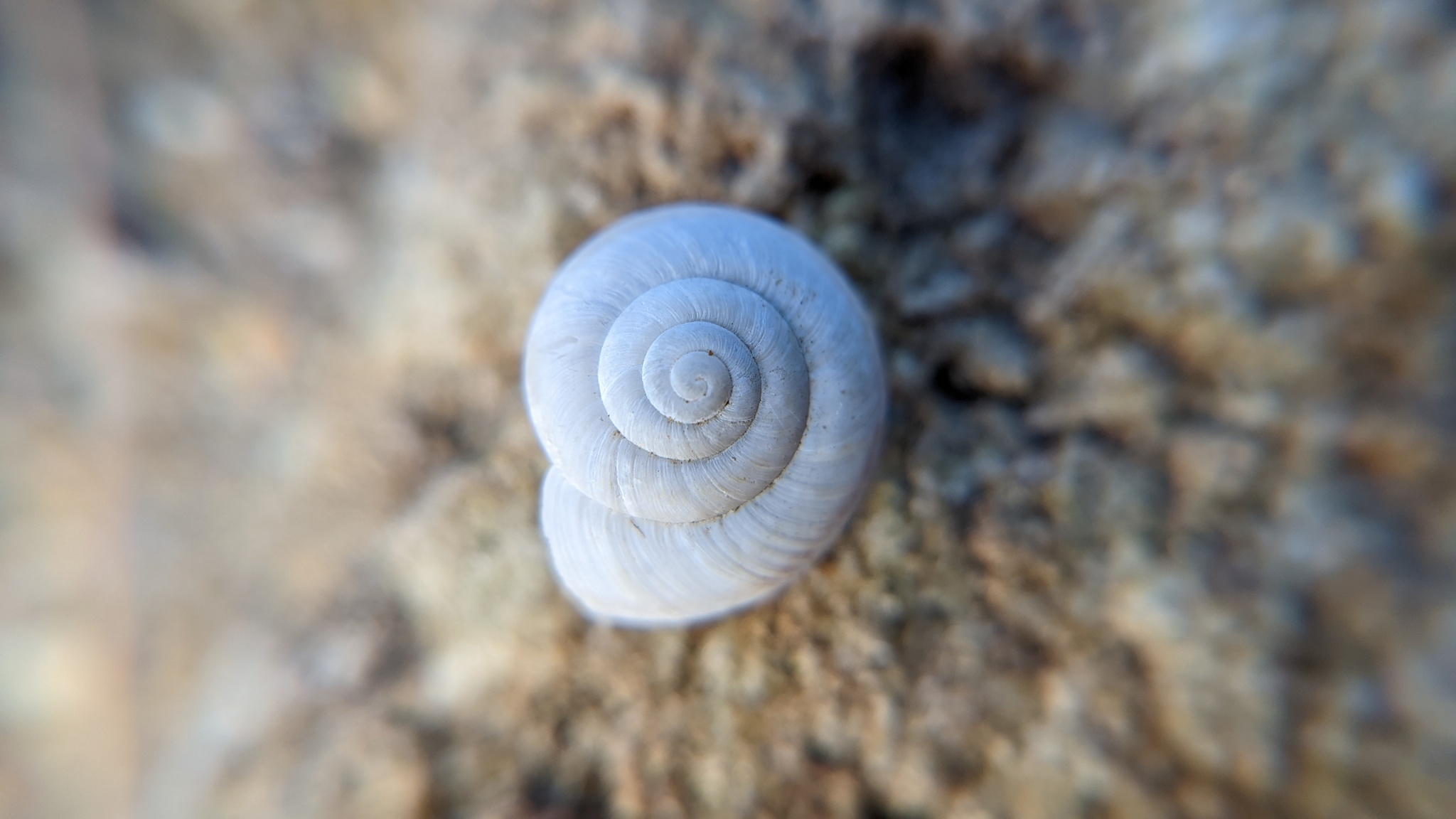
- Sonorelix borregoensis

Scientific classification
- Kingdom: Animalia
- Phylum: Mollusca
- Class: Gastropoda
- Order: Stylommatophora
- Family: Xanthonychidae
- Tribe: Helminthoglyptini
- Genus: Sonorelix; S. S. Berry, 1943

= Sonorelix =

Genus of snails

Sonorelix is a genus of terrestrial snail.

The genus was first described in 1943 by S. Stillman Berry.

== Taxonomy ==
Sonorelix contains the following species:

- Sonorelix avawatzica (S. S. Berry, 1930)
- Sonorelix baileyi (Bartsch, 1904)
- Sonorelix borregoensis (S. S. Berry, 1929)
- Sonorelix bowersi (Bryant, 1900)
- Sonorelix harperi (Bryant, 1900)
- Sonorelix melanopylon (S. S. Berry, 1930)
- Sonorelix micrometalleus (S. S. Berry, 1930)
- Sonorelix rixfordi (Pilsbry, 1919)

Synonyms

- Sonorelix (Herpeteros) angelus Gregg, 1949: synonym of Herpeteros angelus (Gregg, 1949)
