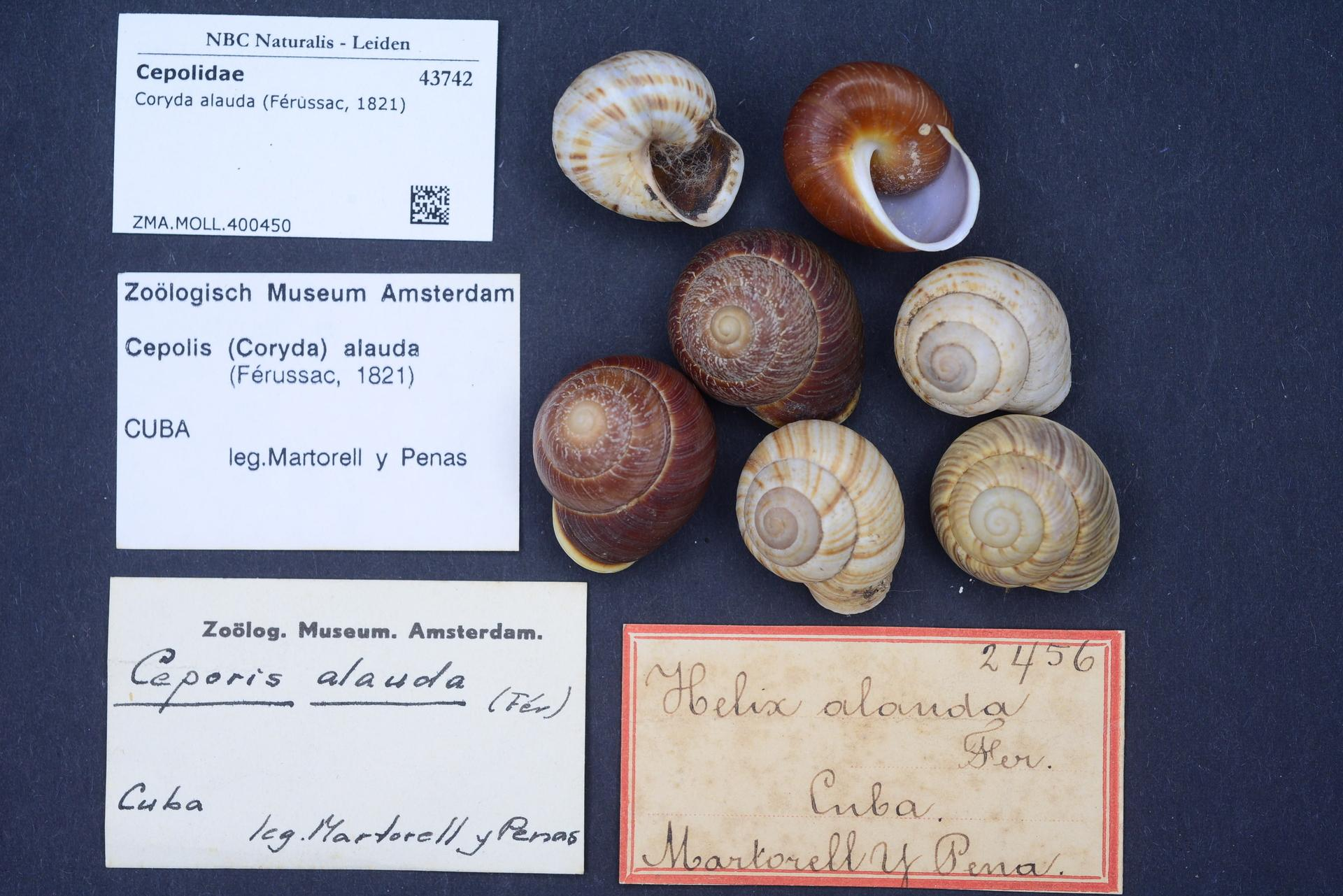
- Cepolis alauda shells

Scientific classification
- Kingdom: Animalia
- Phylum: Mollusca
- Class: Gastropoda
- Order: Stylommatophora
- Superfamily: Helicoidea
- Family: Cepolidae; H. von Ihering, 1909

= Cepolidae (gastropod) =

Family of gastropods

Cepolidae is a family of air-breathing land snails, terrestrial pulmonate gastropod mollusks in the superfamily Helicoidea (according to the taxonomy of the Gastropoda by Bouchet & Rocroi, 2005).

== Distribution ==
Distribution of Cepolidae include Nearctic and Caribbean.

== Anatomy ==
This family is defined by the absence of the diverticulum. Snails in this family have one dart apparatus, and one mucous gland on top of the dart sac. The sheath of the dart apparatus has two glands.

== Taxonomy ==
This family is placed within the clade Stylommatophora within the clade Eupulmonata (according to the taxonomy of the Gastropoda by Bouchet & Rocroi, 2005). In many textbooks and on many websites however this family is listed as the subfamily Cepolinae within the family Helminthoglyptidae.

The name Cepolidae Ihering, 1909 is a homonym for the family Cepolidae Rafinesque, 1815 (based on Cepola Linnaeus, 1766) a family of bandfishes in the superfamily Cepoloidea within the order Perciformes. The name of the gastropod family needs be submitted to the International Commission on Zoological Nomenclature to resolve the homonymy.

== Genera ==
Genera within the family Cepolidae include:

- Bellacepolis Baker, 1943
- Cepolis Montfort, 1810 - type genus of the family Cepolidae
- Coryda Albers, 1850
- Cysticopsis Mörch, 1852
- Dialeuca Albers, 1850
- Euclastaria Pilsbry, 1926
- Eurycampta Von Martens, 1860
- Guladentia Clench y Aguayo, 1951
- Hemitrochus Swainson, 1840
- Jeanneretia L. Pfeiffer, 1877
- Levicepolis Baker, 1943
- Plagioptycha L. Pfeiffer, 1855
- Setipellis Pilsbry, 1926
- Polymita Beck, 1837
