= Dialeuca =

Scientific classification
- Kingdom: Animalia
- Phylum: Mollusca
- Class: Gastropoda
- Order: Stylommatophora
- Family: Cepolidae
- Genus: Dialeuca; Albers, 1850

Type species
- Helix nemoraloides C. B. Adams, 1845

Synonyms
- Cepolis (Dialeuca) Albers, 1850 (unaccepted combination); Helix (Dialeuca) Albers, 1850 (original rank); Leptoloma E. von Martens, 1860

Genus of gastropods

Dialeuca is a genus of gastropods belonging to the family Cepolidae.

The species of this genus are found in Central America.

Species:

- Dialeuca blandiana (C. B. Adams, 1850)
- Dialeuca conspersula (L. Pfeiffer, 1846)
- Dialeuca nemoraloides (Adams, 1845)
- Dialeuca subconica (C. B. Adams, 1845)
