= Cepolis =

Scientific classification
- Kingdom: Animalia
- Phylum: Mollusca
- Class: Gastropoda
- Order: Stylommatophora
- Family: Cepolidae
- Genus: Cepolis; Montfort, 1810

Type species
- Cepolum nicolsinianum Montfort, 1810

Synonyms
- Cepolum Montfort, 1810 (alternative original spelling); Helix (Cepolis)

Genus of gastropods

Cepolis is a genus of gastropods belonging to the family Cepolidae.

The species of this genus are found in Southeastern Asia and Central America.

Species:

- Cepolis boriquenae H. B. Baker, 1940
- Cepolis cepa (Müller, 1774)
- Cepolis chocolata Pilsbry, 1933
- Cepolis crusta (Dall, 1890)
- Cepolis cunctator (Dall, 1890)
- Cepolis dermatina (Shuttleworth, 1854)
- Cepolis direpta (Dall, 1890)
- Cepolis infissa Watters, 2020
- Cepolis instrumosa (Dall, 1890)
- Cepolis isomeroides Watters, 2020
- Cepolis latebrosa (Dall, 1890)
- Cepolis poeyi (Petit de la Saussaye, 1836)
- Cepolis squamosa (Férussac, 1821)

Species brought into synonymy

- Cepolis definita Fulton, 1908: synonym of Cepolella definita (Fulton, 1908) (original combination)
- [Cepolis hispaniolana Clench, 1962: synonym of Cepolella hispaniolana (Clench, 1962) (superseded combination)
- Cepolis levibasis Vanatta, 1923: synonym of Cepolella definita (Fulton, 1908)
- Cepolis lincolni Bartsch, 1932: synonym of Cepolella trizonalis (Grateloup, 1840)
- Cepolis maynardi (Pilsbry, 1892): synonym of Plagioptycha maynardi (Pilsbry, 1892) (unaccepted combination)
- Cepolis musicola (Shuttleworth, 1854): synonym of Euclastaria musicola (Shuttleworth, 1854) (unaccepted combination)
- Cepolis pemphigodes (L. Pfeiffer, 1847): synonym of Cysticopsis pemphigodes (L. Pfeiffer, 1847) (superseded combination)
- Cepolis porcellana (Grateloup, 1840): synonym of Laevicepolis porcellana (Grateloup, 1840)
- Cepolis trizonalis (Grateloup, 1840): synonym of Cepolella trizonalis (Grateloup, 1840)
- Cepolis wetmorei Bartsch, 1932: synonym of Laevicepolis porcellana (Grateloup, 1840)
