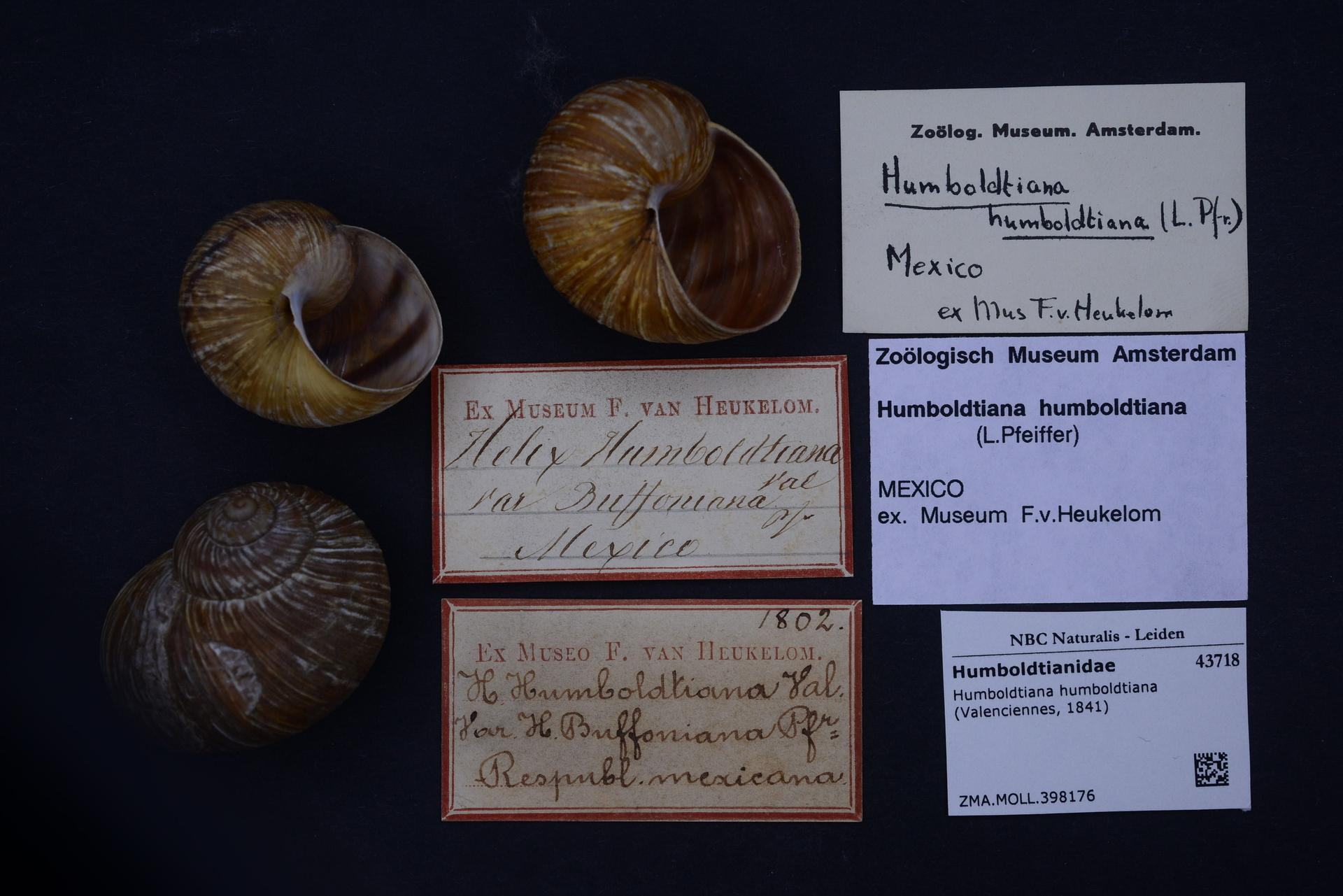
- Humboldtiana humboldtiana shells

Scientific classification
- Kingdom: Animalia
- Phylum: Mollusca
- Class: Gastropoda
- Order: Stylommatophora
- Family: Xanthonychidae
- Genus: Humboldtiana; H. von Ihering, 1892

= Humboldtiana =

Genus of gastropods

Humboldtiana is a genus of American air-breathing land snails, terrestrial pulmonate gastropod mollusks in the subfamily Humboldtianinae.

== Anatomy ==
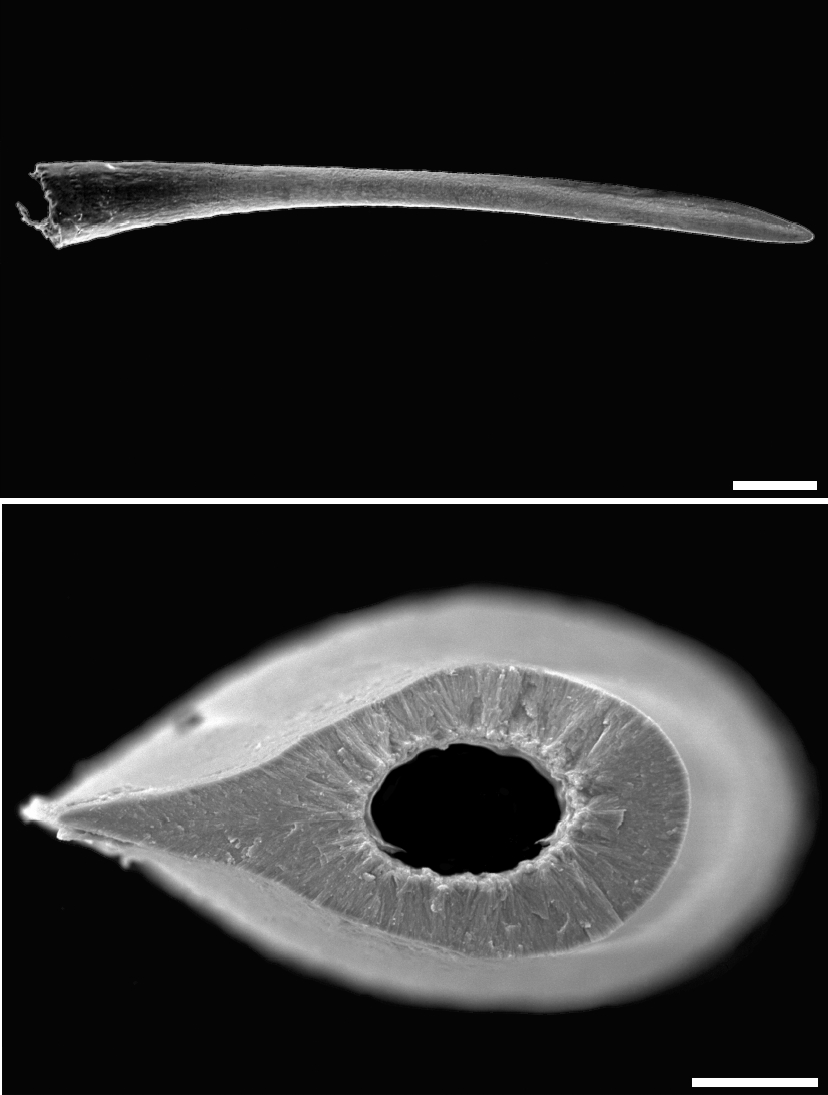
love dart of Humboldtiana nuevoleonis

Snails in this genus create and use love darts as part of their mating behavior.

The scanning electron microscope images on the left show (above) the lateral view of the love dart of Humboldtiana nuevoleonis, scale bar 500 μm (0.5 mm); and (below) a cross section of the dart, scale bar 50 μm.

== Species ==
Species within the genus Humboldtiana include:

- Humboldtiana agavophila Pratt, 1971
- Humboldtiana hoegiana
- Humboldtiana nuevoleonis Pilsbry, 1927
- Humboldtiana ultima
