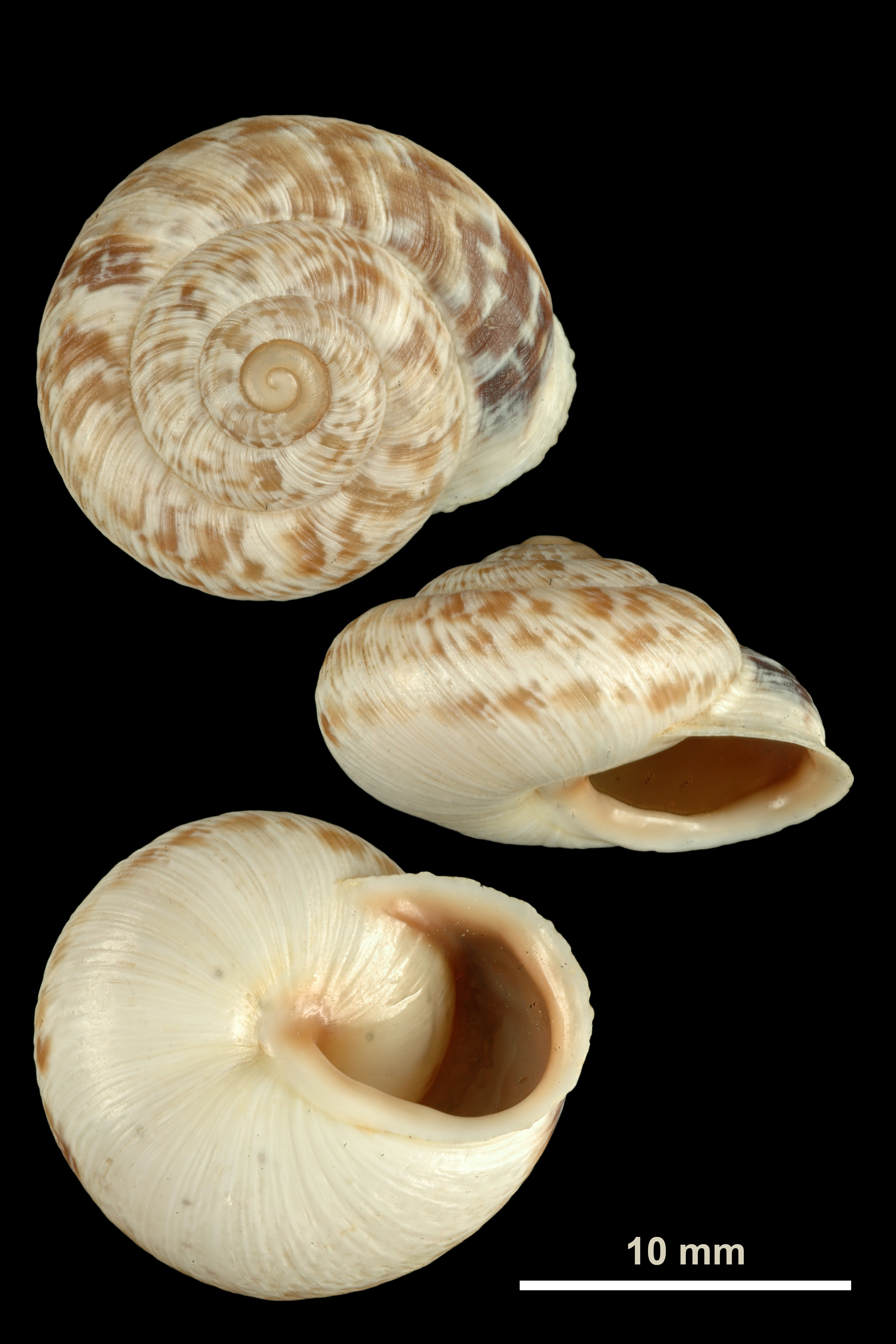
- Shell of Marmorana muralis (specimen at MNHN, Paris)

Scientific classification
- Kingdom: Animalia
- Phylum: Mollusca
- Class: Gastropoda
- Order: Stylommatophora
- Superfamily: Helicoidea
- Family: Helicidae
- Subfamily: Murellinae
- Genus: Marmorana; W. Hartmann, 1844

Type species
- Helix serpentina A. Férussac, 1821

Synonyms
- Helix (Marmorana) W. Hartmann, 1844; Marmorana (Ambigua) Westerlund, 1903· accepted, alternate representation; Marmorana (Marmorana) W. Hartmann, 1844· accepted, alternate representation; Marmorana (Murella) L. Pfeiffer, 1877· accepted, alternate representation; Murella L. Pfeiffer, 1877; Murella (Opica) Kobelt, 1904; Opica Kobelt, 1904

= Marmorana =

Genus of gastropods

Marmorana is a genus of air-breathing land snails, terrestrial pulmonate gastropod mollusks in the subfamily Murellinae of the family Helicidae.

== Anatomy ==
Species within this genus create and use love darts as part of their mating behavior.

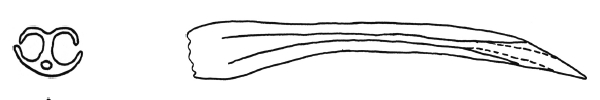
Love dart of Marmorana serpentina

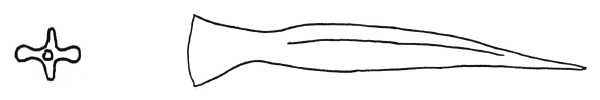
Love dart of Marmorana scabriuscula

== Taxonomy ==
Marmorana is paraphyletic.

== Species ==
Species within the genus Marmorana include:

- Marmorana fuscolabiata (Rossmässler, 1842)
- Marmorana globularis (Philippi, 1836)
- † Marmorana majoris (De Stefani, 1880)
- Marmorana melitensis (A. Férussac, 1821)
- Marmorana muralis (O. F. Müller, 1774)
- Marmorana nebrodensis (O. F. Müller, 1774)
- Marmorana platychela (Menke, 1830)
- † Marmorana sabina (Tuccimei, 1889)
- Marmorana saxetana (Paulucci, 1886)
- Marmorana scabriuscula (Deshayes, 1832)
- Marmorana serpentina (A. Férussac, 1821) - type species
- Marmorana sicana
- Marmorana signata (A. Férussac, 1821)
