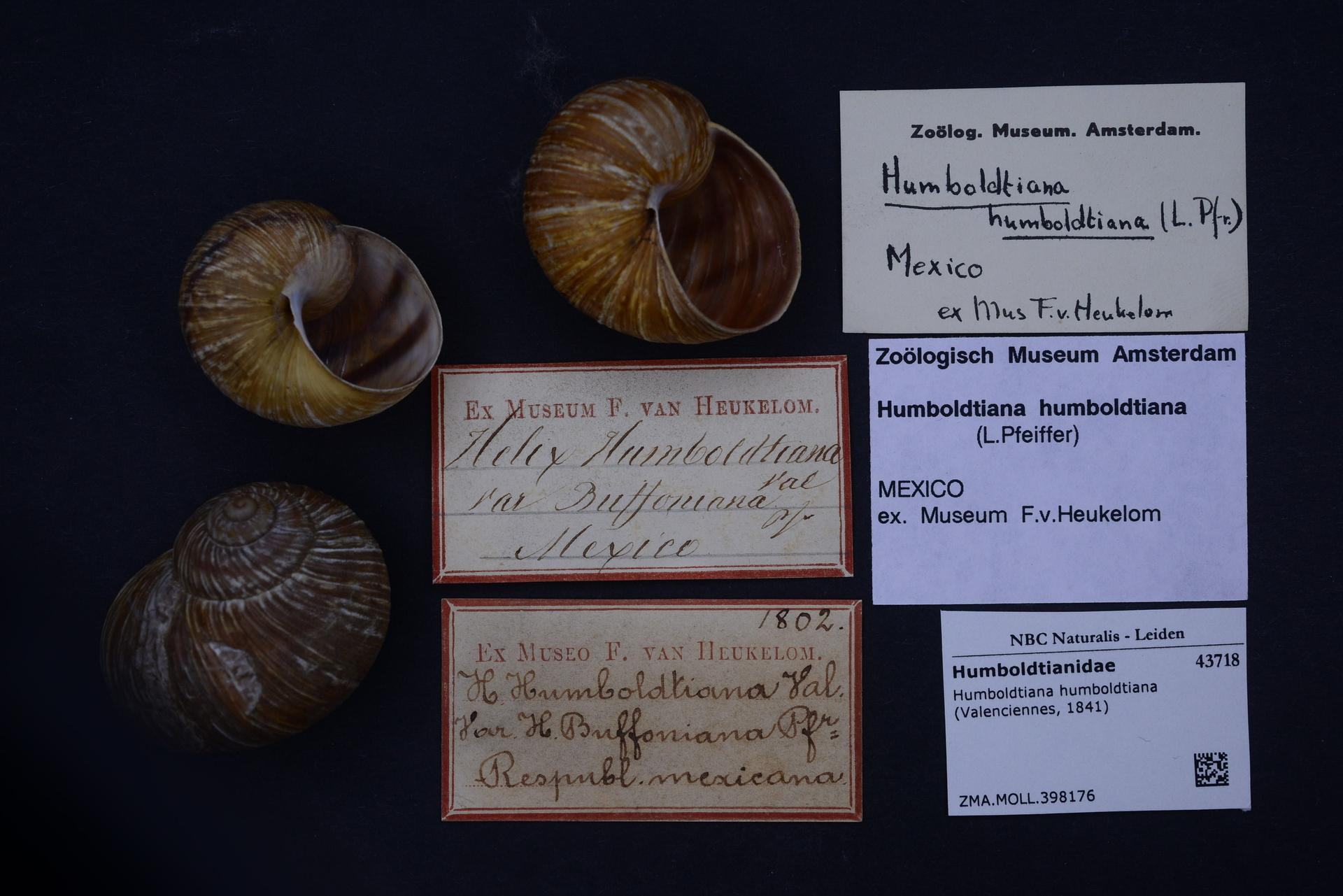
- Humboldtiana humboldtiana shells

Scientific classification
- Kingdom: Animalia
- Phylum: Mollusca
- Class: Gastropoda
- Order: Stylommatophora
- Family: Xanthonychidae
- Subfamily: Humboldtianinae; Pilsbry, 1939

Synonyms
- Humboldtianidae Pilsbry, 1939

= Humboldtianinae =

Family of gastropods

Humboldtianinae is an subfamily of air-breathing land snails, terrestrial pulmonate gastropod mollusks in the family Xanthonychidae.

== Taxonomy ==
The subfamily Humboldtianinae consists of the following taxa:

- Tribe Bunnyini H. Nordsieck, 1987
  - Bunnya H. B. Baker, 1942
- Tribe Humboldtianini Pilsbry, 1939
  - Humboldtiana Ihering, 1892
- Tribe unassigned
  - †Skinnerelix Evanoff & B. Roth, 1992

== Anatomy ==
The anatomy of this subfamily is defined by the presence of a diverticulum and three to four dart apparatuses (the love dart is used in mating behaviour). They always have the same number of dart sacs and mucous glands, with two darts per dart sac. The mucous glands are situated on, and open into, the vagina, above the dart sac.

Shape of love dart	Species
	Humboldtiana nuevoleonis

== Distribution ==
Species of the subfamily of Humboldtianinae are found in the United States and Mexico.
