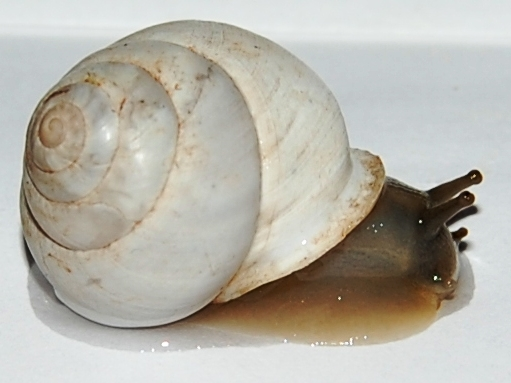
- A live individual of Marmorana platychela sicana

Scientific classification
- Kingdom: Animalia
- Phylum: Mollusca
- Class: Gastropoda
- Order: Stylommatophora
- Family: Helicidae
- Genus: Marmorana
- Species: M. platychela

Binomial name
- Marmorana platychela (Menke, 1830)

= Marmorana platychela =

Species of gastropod

Marmorana platychela is a species of air-breathing land snail, a terrestrial pulmonate gastropod mollusc in the family Helicidae.

== Distribution ==
This species lives in north-western Sicily (Italy). It is confined to limestone rock faces.

== Description ==
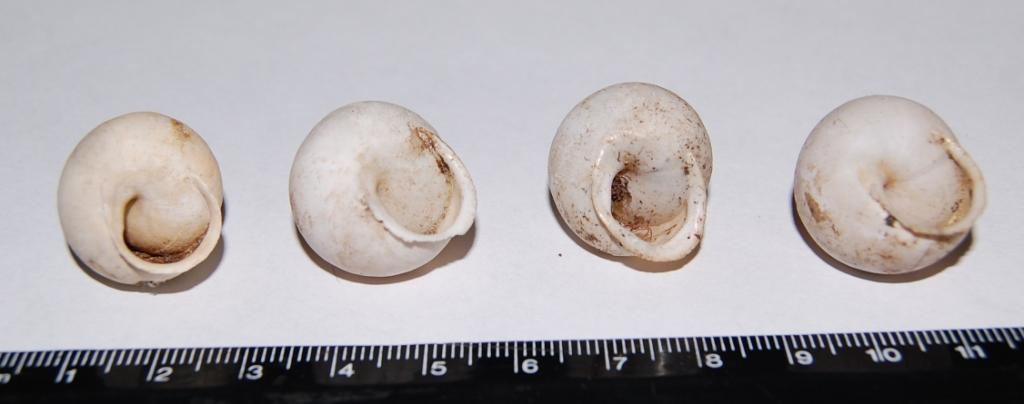
Shells of Marmorana platychela sicana from Monte Pellegrino.

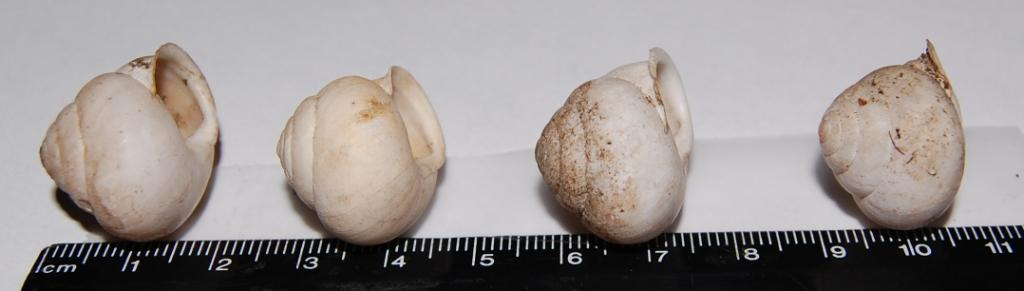
Shells of Marmorana platychela sicana from Monte Pellegrino.
