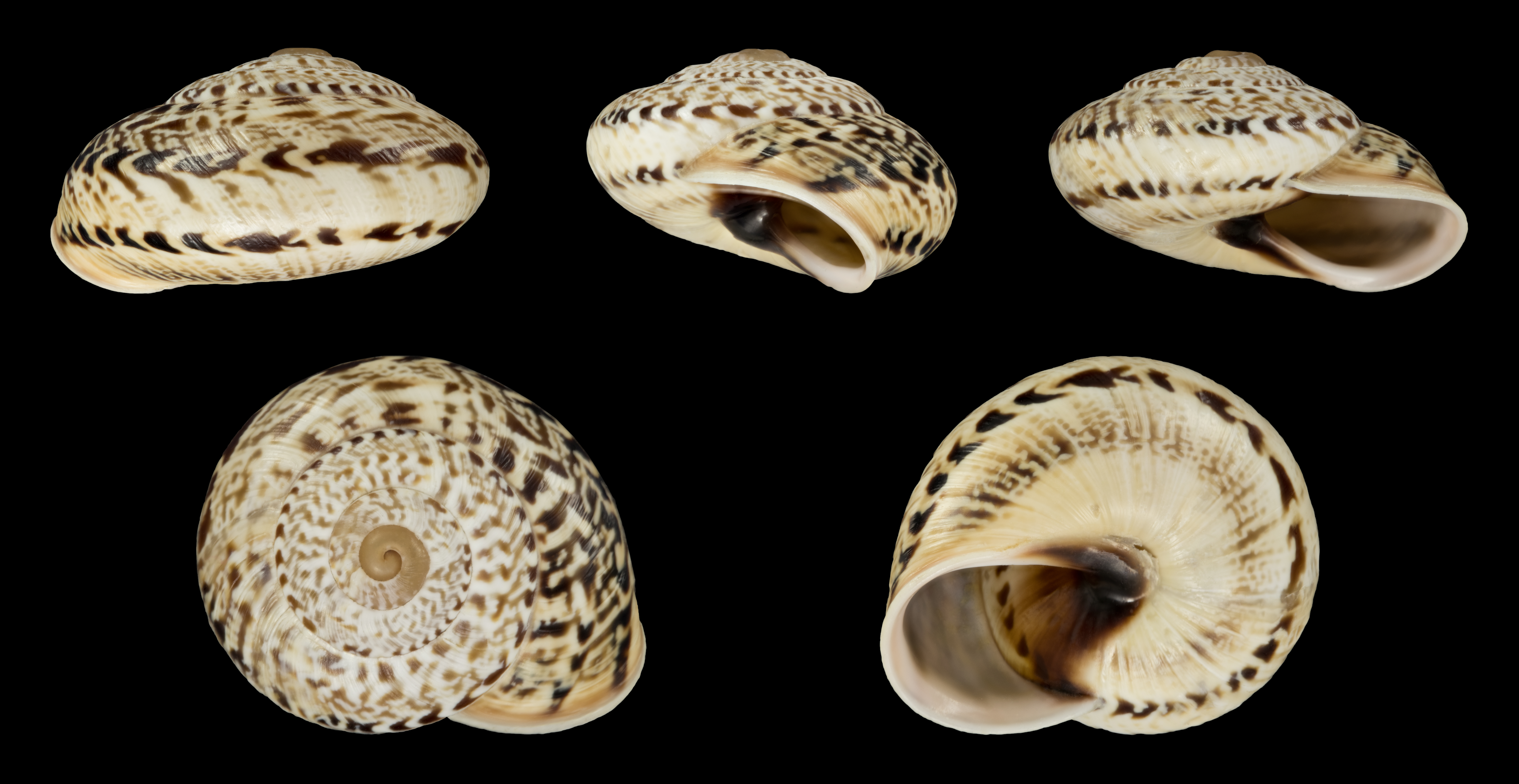

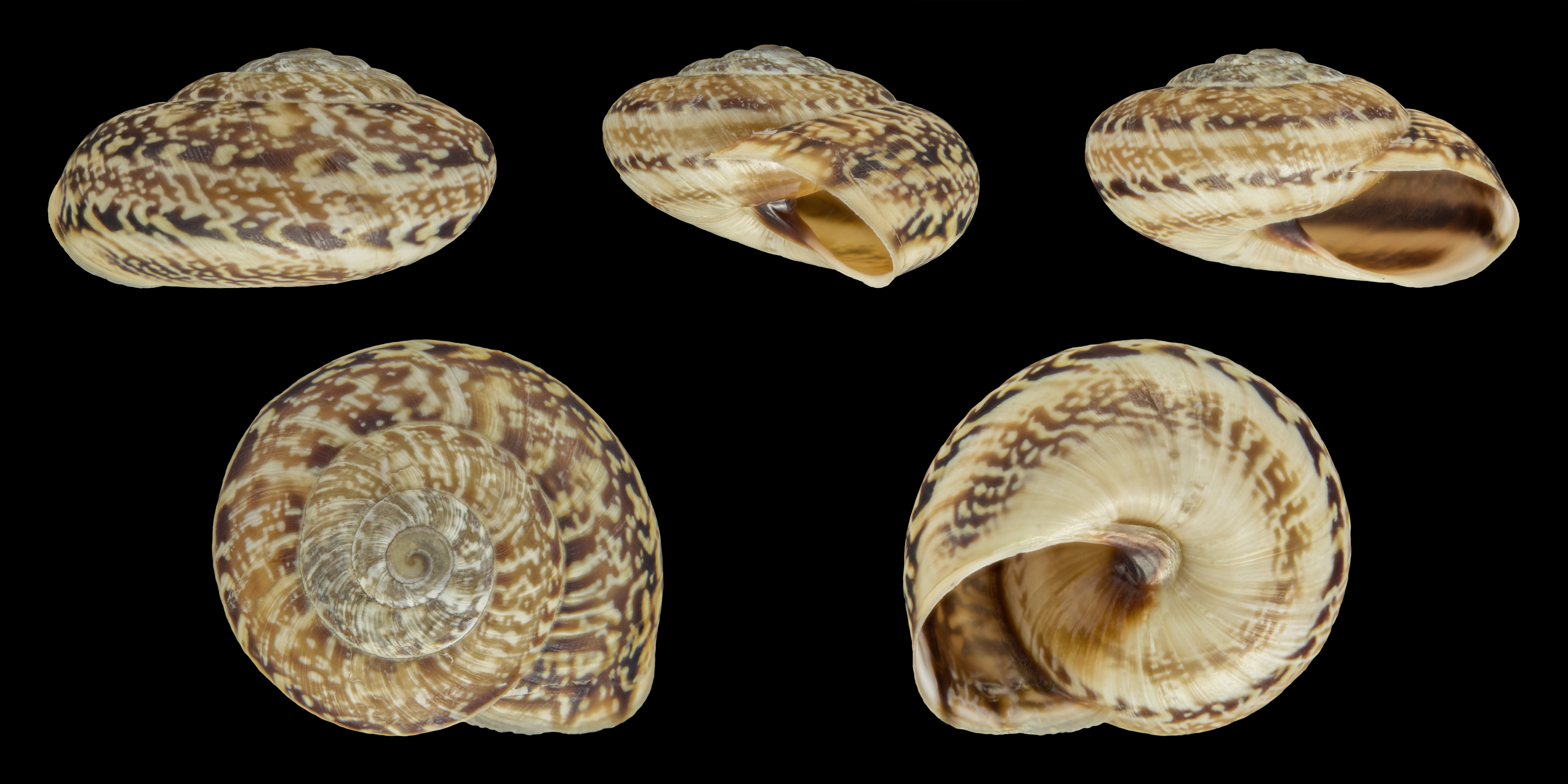

Scientific classification
- Kingdom: Animalia
- Phylum: Mollusca
- Class: Gastropoda
- Order: Stylommatophora
- Family: Helicidae
- Genus: Marmorana
- Species: M. serpentina

Binomial name
- Marmorana serpentina (Férussac, 1821)

Synonyms
- Helix cenestinensis Crosse & Debeaux, 1869; Helix serpentina A. Férussac, 1821 (original combination); Helix serpentina var. panormitana Benoit, 1857 (junior synonym); Marmorana (Marmorana) serpentina (A. Férussac, 1821)· accepted, alternate representation

= Marmorana serpentina =

Species of gastropod

Marmorana serpentina is a species of air-breathing land snail, a terrestrial pulmonate gastropod mollusc in the family Helicidae.

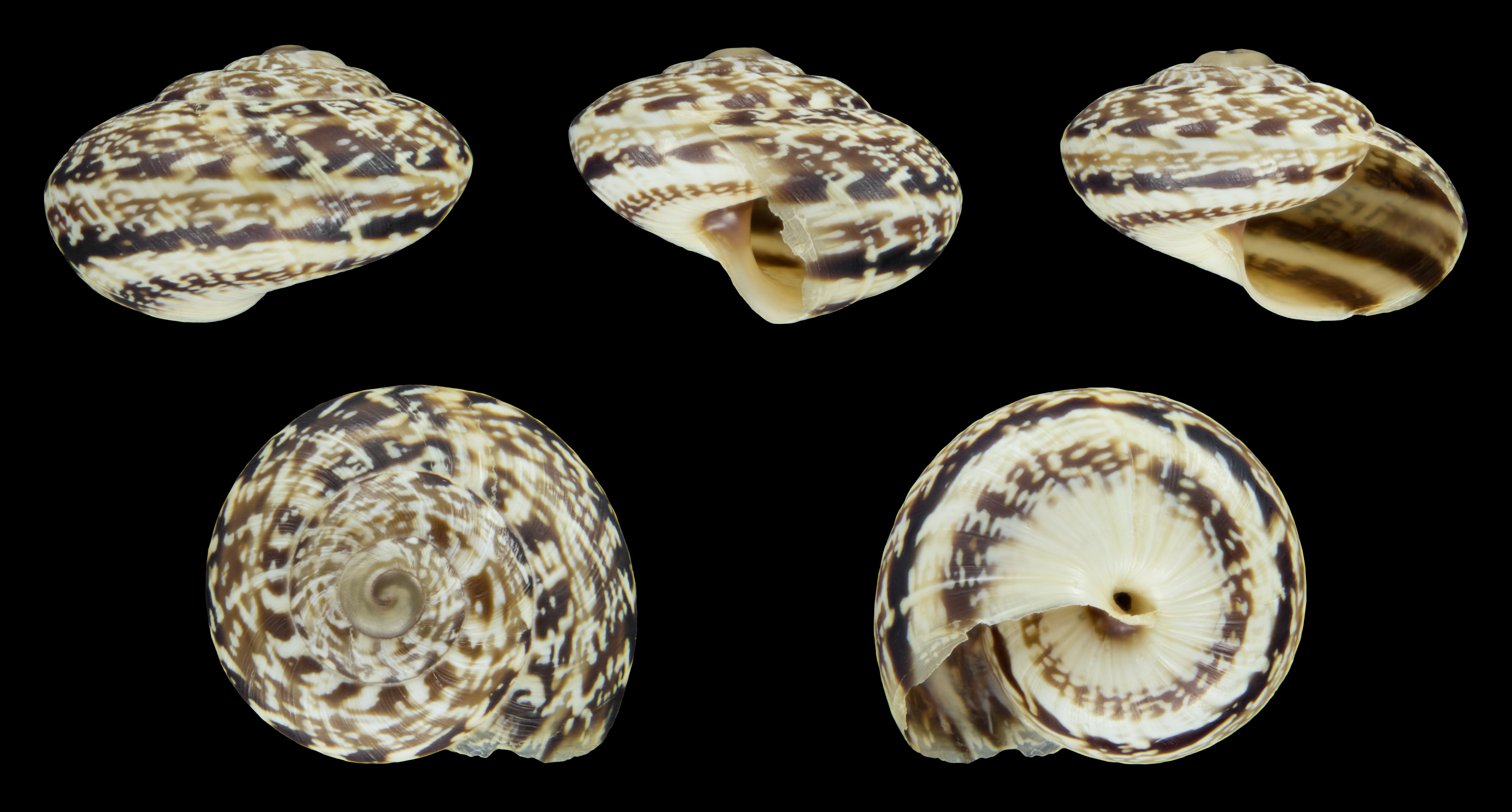
Subadult

Subspecies

- Marmorana serpentina carae (Cantraine, 1840)
- Marmorana serpentina circeja (Kobelt, 1903)
- Marmorana serpentina hospitans (Rossmässler, 1836)
- Marmorana serpentina isarae (Paulucci, 1882)
- Marmorana serpentina isilensis (L. Pfeiffer, 1848)
- Marmorana serpentina jaspidaea (Moquin-Tandon, 1855)
- Marmorana serpentina serpentina (A. Férussac, 1821)

== Distribution ==
This species of snail occurs in the area of Alghero, in western Sardinia; also in Corsica.

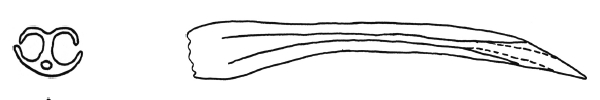
Love dart of Marmorana serpentina

== Anatomy ==
This snail creates and uses love darts as part of its mating behavior.
