= Humboldtiana nuevoleonis =

Scientific classification
- Kingdom: Animalia
- Phylum: Mollusca
- Class: Gastropoda
- Order: Stylommatophora
- Family: Xanthonychidae
- Genus: Humboldtiana
- Species: H. nuevoleonis

Binomial name
- Humboldtiana nuevoleonis Pilsbry, 1927

Species of gastropod

Humboldtiana nuevoleonis is a species of American air-breathing land snail, a terrestrial pulmonate gastropod mollusk in the family Humboldtianidae.

== Anatomy ==
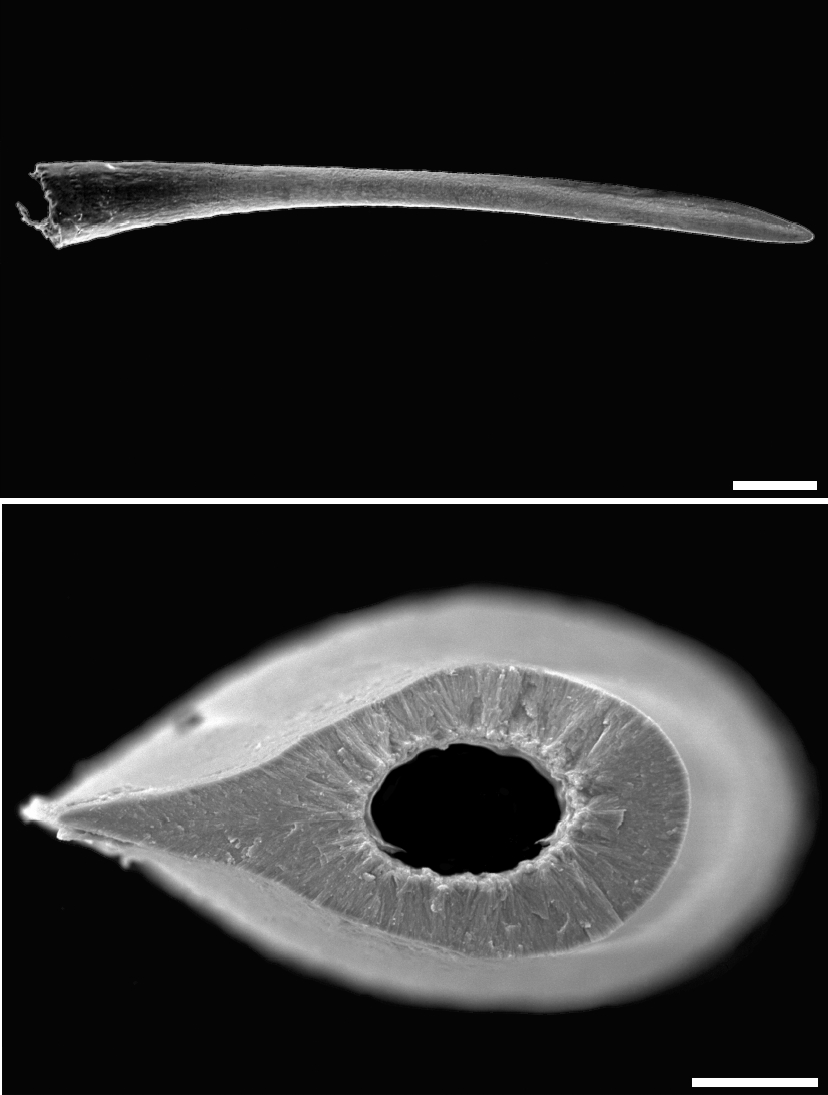
The scanning electron microscope image of the love dart of Humboldtiana nuevoleonis: lateral view (above), scale bar 500 μm (0.5 mm); and a cross section of the dart (below), scale bar 50 μm.

Snails in this species create and use love darts as part of their mating behavior.
