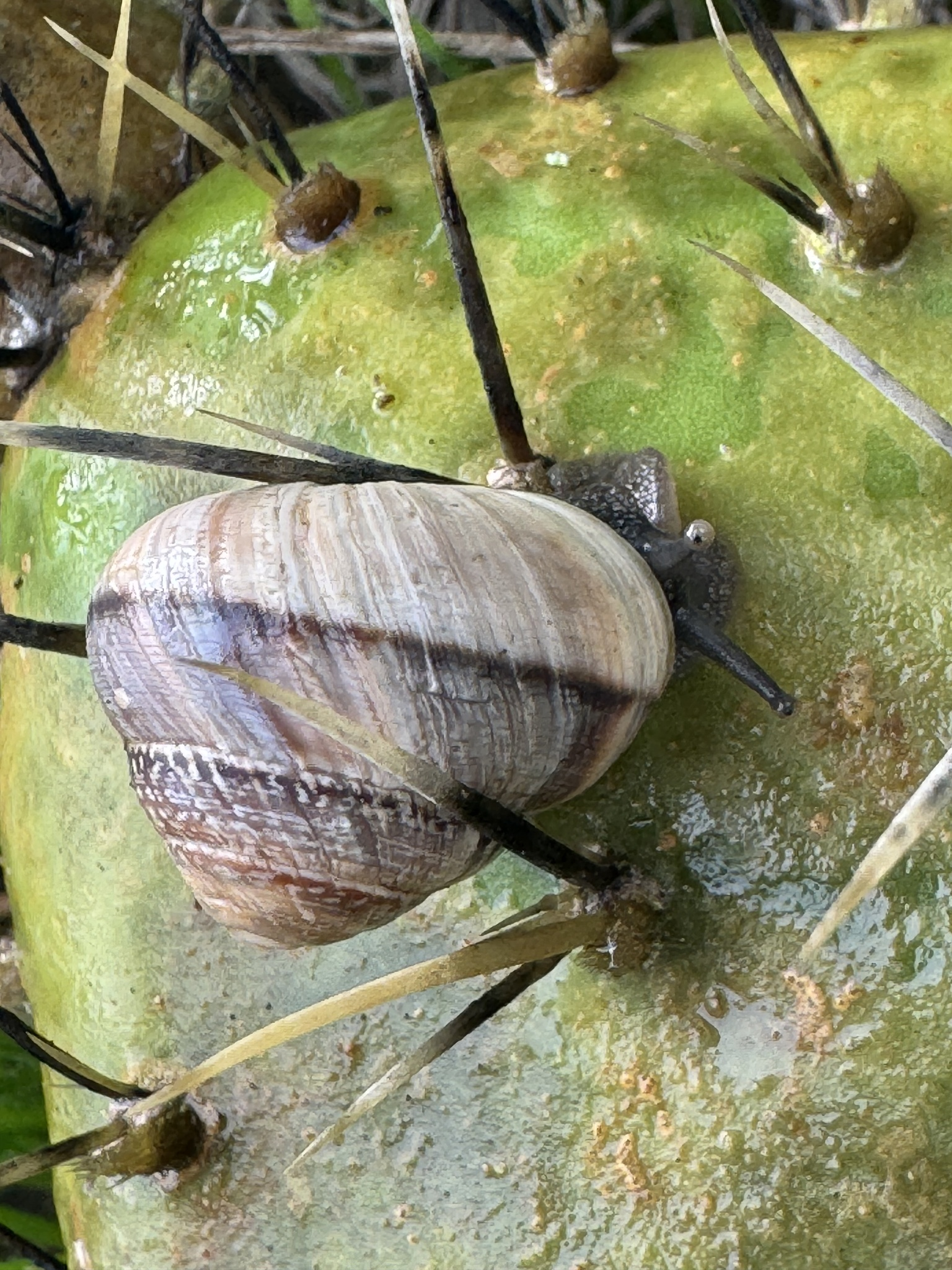

Conservation status
- Vulnerable (IUCN 2.3)

- Critically Imperiled (NatureServe)

Scientific classification
- Kingdom: Animalia
- Phylum: Mollusca
- Class: Gastropoda
- Order: Stylommatophora
- Family: Xanthonychidae
- Genus: Xerarionta
- Species: X. tryoni

Binomial name
- Xerarionta tryoni (Newcomb, 1864)

= Bicolor cactus snail =

Species of gastropod

The bicolor cactus snail (Xerarionta tryoni) is a species of land snail in the family Helminthoglyptidae. This species is endemic to the United States.
