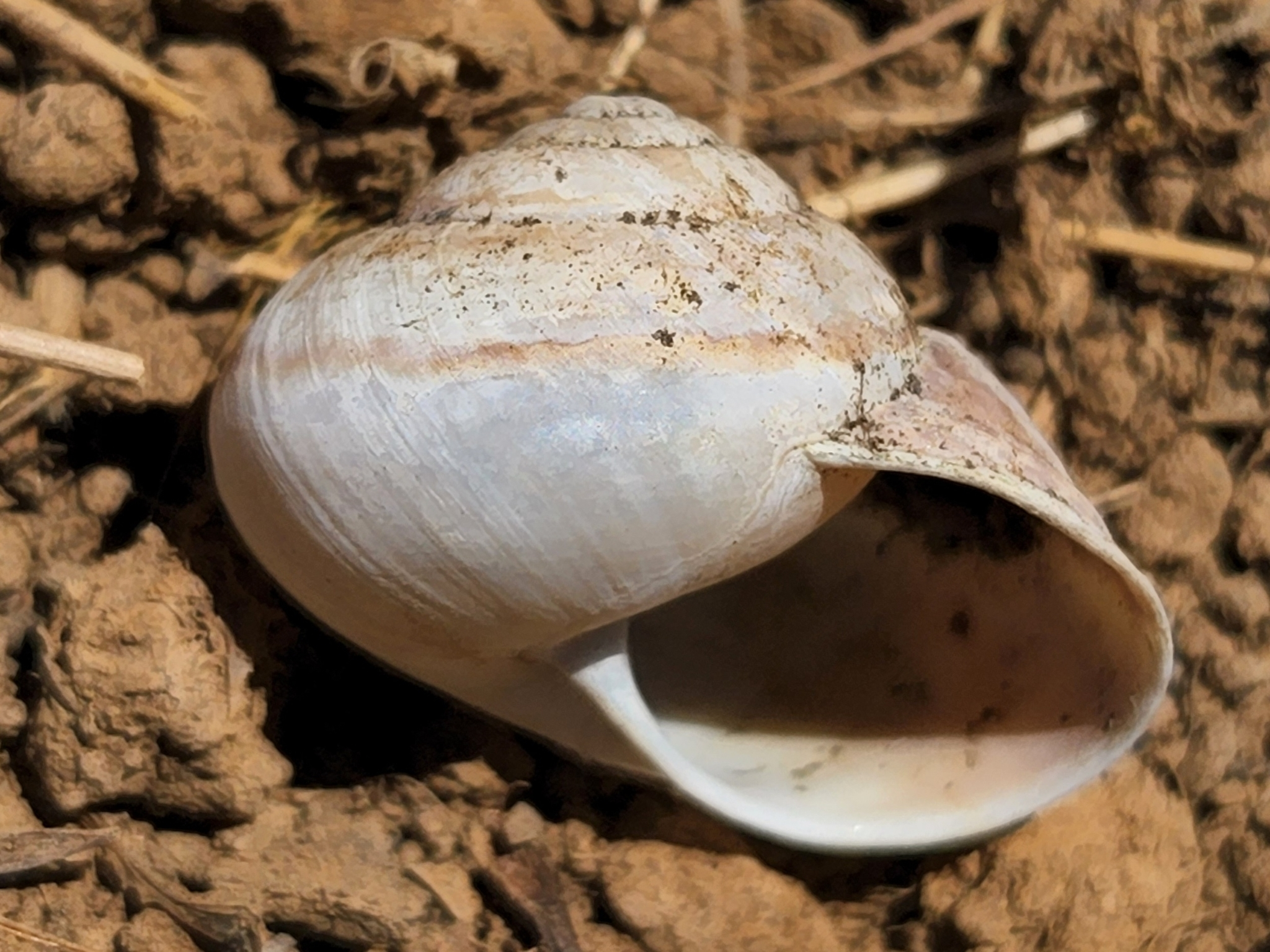

Conservation status
- Secure (NatureServe)

Scientific classification
- Kingdom: Animalia
- Phylum: Mollusca
- Class: Gastropoda
- Order: Stylommatophora
- Family: Xanthonychidae
- Genus: Xerarionta
- Species: X. kelletii

Binomial name
- Xerarionta kelletii (Forbes, 1850)

= Xerarionta kellettii =

Species of gastropod

Xerarionta kelletii, the Catalina Cactussnail, is a species of air-breathing land snail native to Santa Catalina Island off the coast of southern California. An isolated population is found on the mainland on the Palos Verdes peninsula, but it is unclear if living snails still persist there.

== Anatomy ==
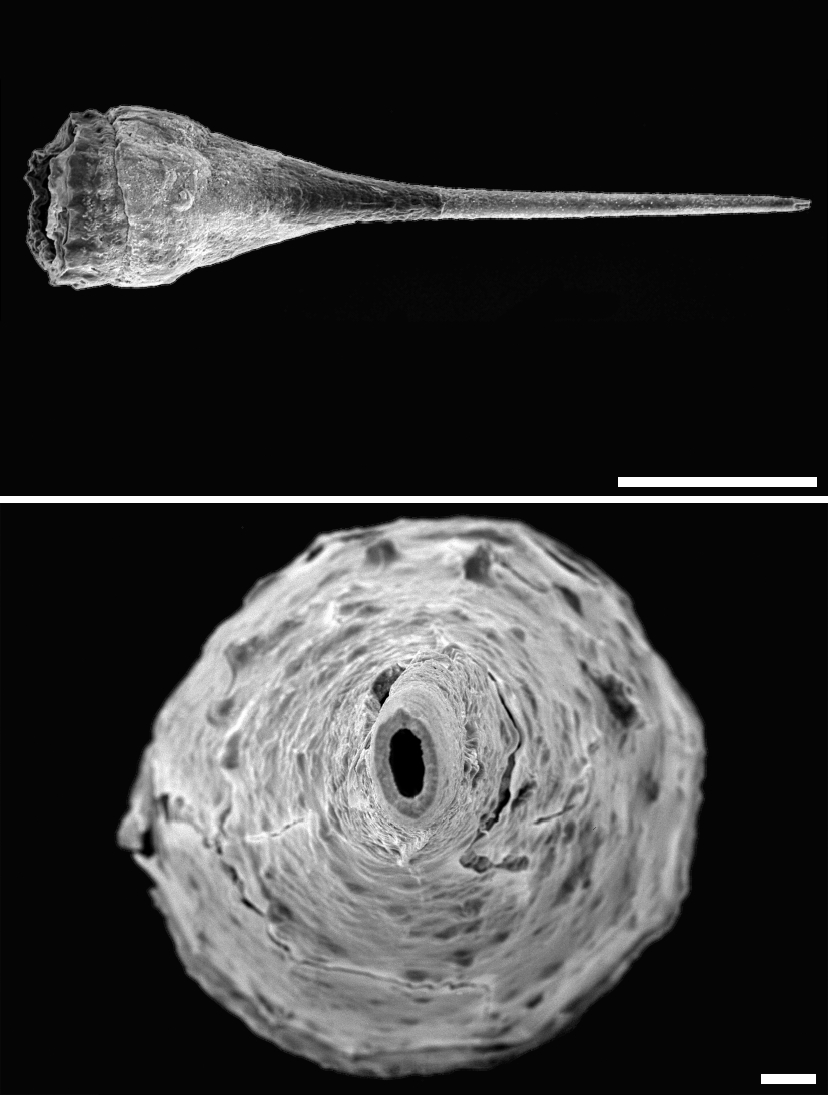

Snails in this species create and use love darts during mating.

The scanning electron microscope images on the left show (above) the lateral view of the love dart, scale bar 500 μm (0.5 mm); and (below) a cross section of the dart, scale bar 50 μm.
