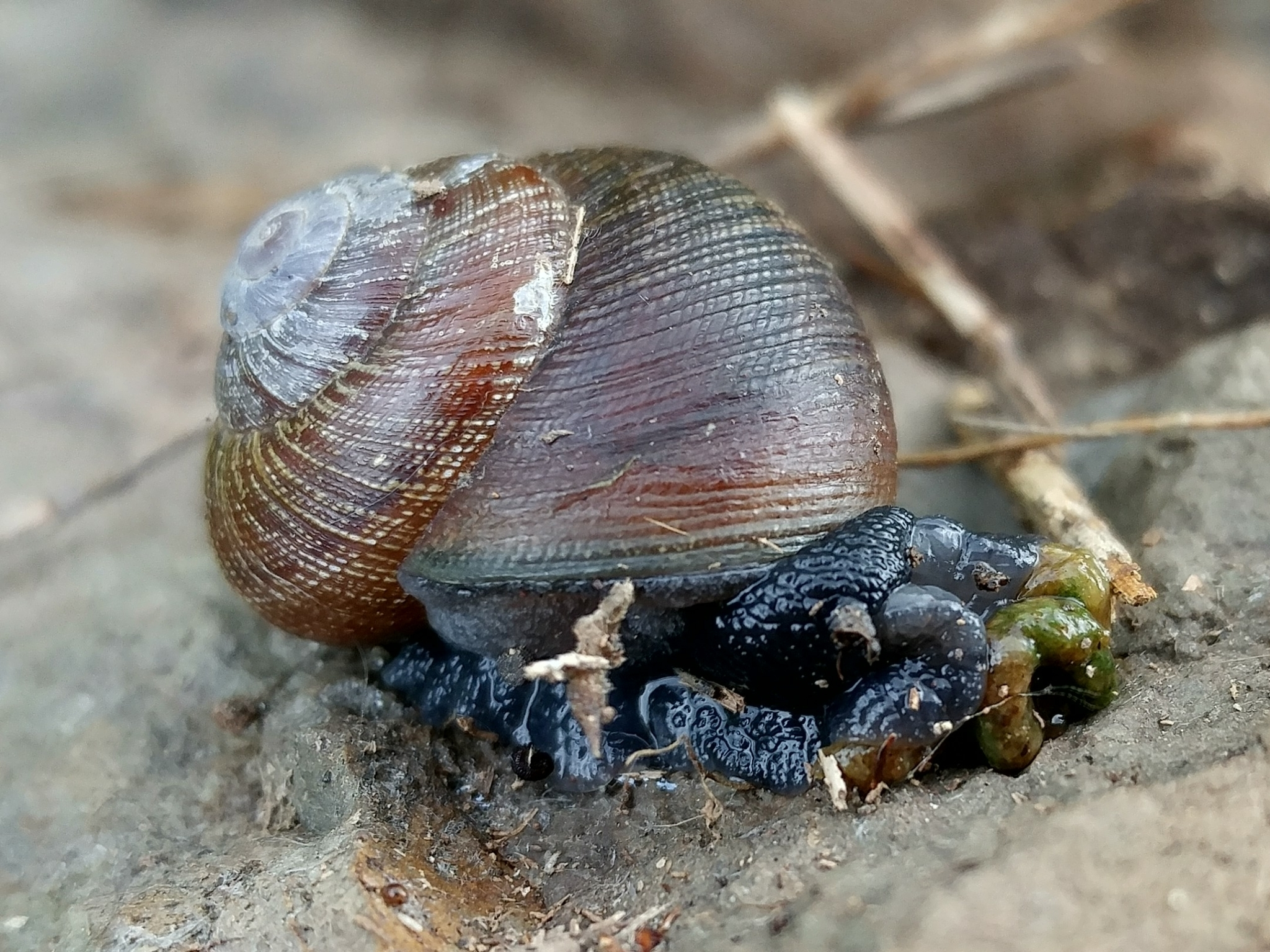
- Xerarionta intercisa

Scientific classification
- Kingdom: Animalia
- Phylum: Mollusca
- Class: Gastropoda
- Order: Stylommatophora
- Family: Xanthonychidae
- Tribe: Helminthoglyptini
- Genus: Xerarionta; Pilsbry, 1913

Species
- see text

Synonyms
- List: Micrarionta (Plesarionta) Pilsbry, 1939; Micrarionta (Xerarionta) Pilsbry, 1913; Plesarionta Pilsbry, 1939; Xerarionta (Plesarionta) Pilsbry, 1939; Xerarionta (Xerarionta) Pilsbry, 1913

= Xerarionta =

Genus of gastropods

Xerarionta is a genus of land snails in the subfamily Helminthoglyptinae. Xerarionta are native to the pacific coast and islands of southern California and the Baja California peninsula, with the northernmost native population occurring on the Palos Verdes peninsula (possibly extirpated).

== Species ==
The following species are recognised in the genus Xerarionta:

- Xerarionta agnesae (Kanakoff, 1950)
- Xerarionta areolata (L. Pfeiffer, 1845)
- †Xerarionta constenii Pierce, 2001
- Xerarionta intercisa (W. G. Binney, 1857) – plain cactus snail
- Xerarionta kellettii (Forbes, 1850) – Catalina cactus snail
- Xerarionta levis (L. Pfeiffer, 1845)
- Xerarionta orcutti (Dall, 1900)
- Xerarionta pandorae (Forbes, 1850)
- Xerarionta redimita (W. G. Binney, 1858) – wreathed cactus snail
- Xerarionta stearnsiana (Gabb, 1868) – speckled cactus snail
- Xerarionta tryoni (Newcomb, 1864) – bicolor cactus snail
- †Xerarionta waltmilleri B. Roth, 1984
