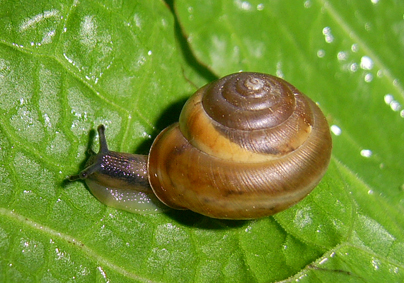

Conservation status
- Least Concern (IUCN 3.1)

Scientific classification
- Kingdom: Animalia
- Phylum: Mollusca
- Class: Gastropoda
- Order: Stylommatophora
- Family: Hygromiidae
- Genus: Monachoides
- Species: M. vicinus

Binomial name
- Monachoides vicinus (O. F. Müller, 1774)

Synonyms
- Perforatella vicina Rossmässler, 1842

= Monachoides vicinus =

Species of gastropod

Monachoides vicinus (syn. Perforatella vicina) is a species of air-breathing land snail, a terrestrial pulmonate gastropod mollusk in the family Hygromiidae, the hairy snails and their allies.

== Distribution ==
This snail is found in the Czech Republic, Poland, Slovakia, Ukraine and other countries.

There are isolated occurrences in the Pannonian Plain (Bátorliget, Hungary) and in the Nordfrankischer Jura (Pottenstein).There are several published and unpublished distribution records and there is no evidence that the area of occupancy (AOO), extent of occurrence (EOO), or the number of locations are declining or extremely fluctuating.

== Description ==
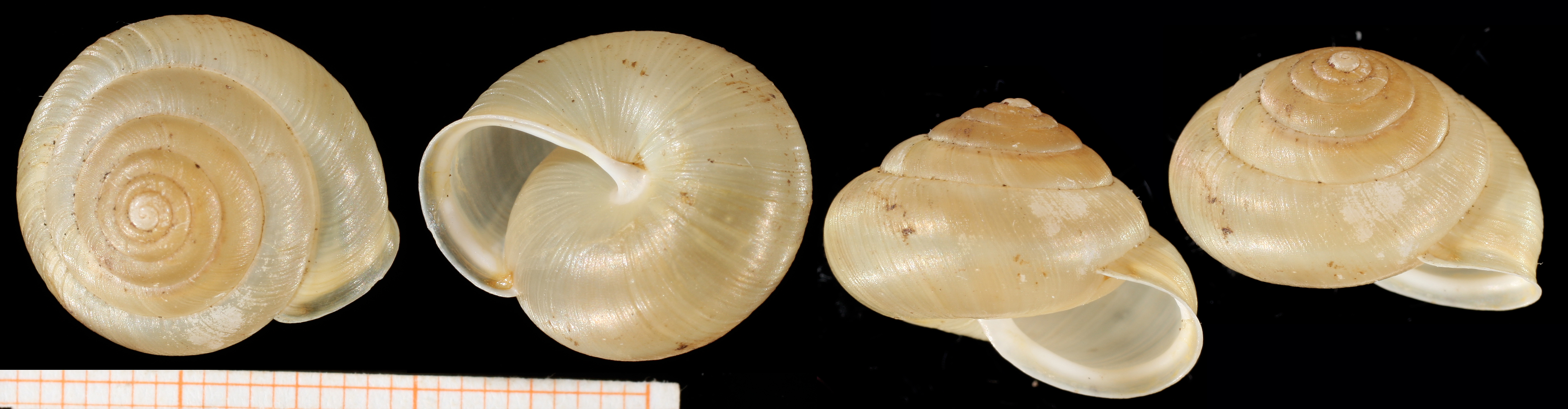
Shell of Monachoides vicinus.

This is a silvicol species with a preference for deciduous and pine forests of higher altitude (over 700 m asl.), where it lives on the ground among leaf-litter, or decaying dead wood.

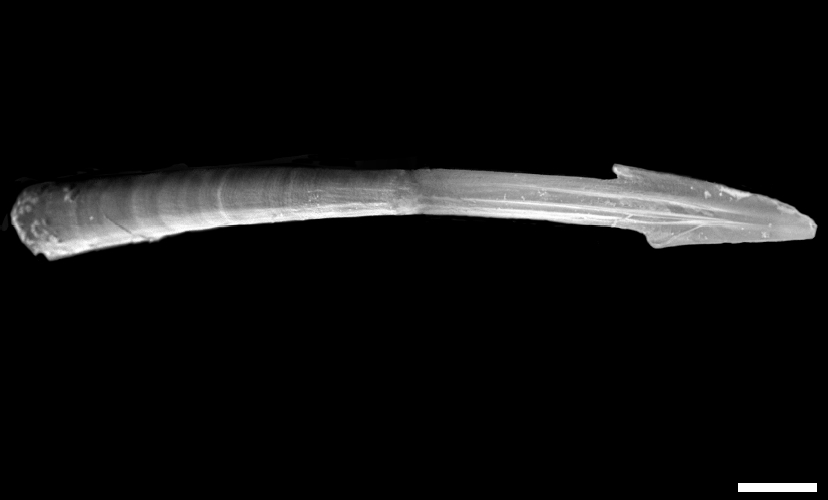
SEM image of lateral view of love dart of Monachoides vicinus. The scale bar is 500 μm (0.5 mm).

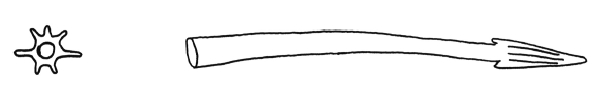
Drawing of love dart of Monachoides vicinus. Cross-section (on the left) and lateral view (on the right)

These snails use love darts as part of their mating behavior.

== Conservation ==
This species is protected in Hungary and some subpopulations are known to occur within protected areas. Although it inhabits a large area (300,000 km^{2}), due to its special habitat preference, the population is fragmented. The species' range is not satisfactorily explored and there are no data on population trend. However, forest habitats are known to be diminishing in that region and therefore one might suppose that number of subpopulations or the number of mature individuals are declining.
