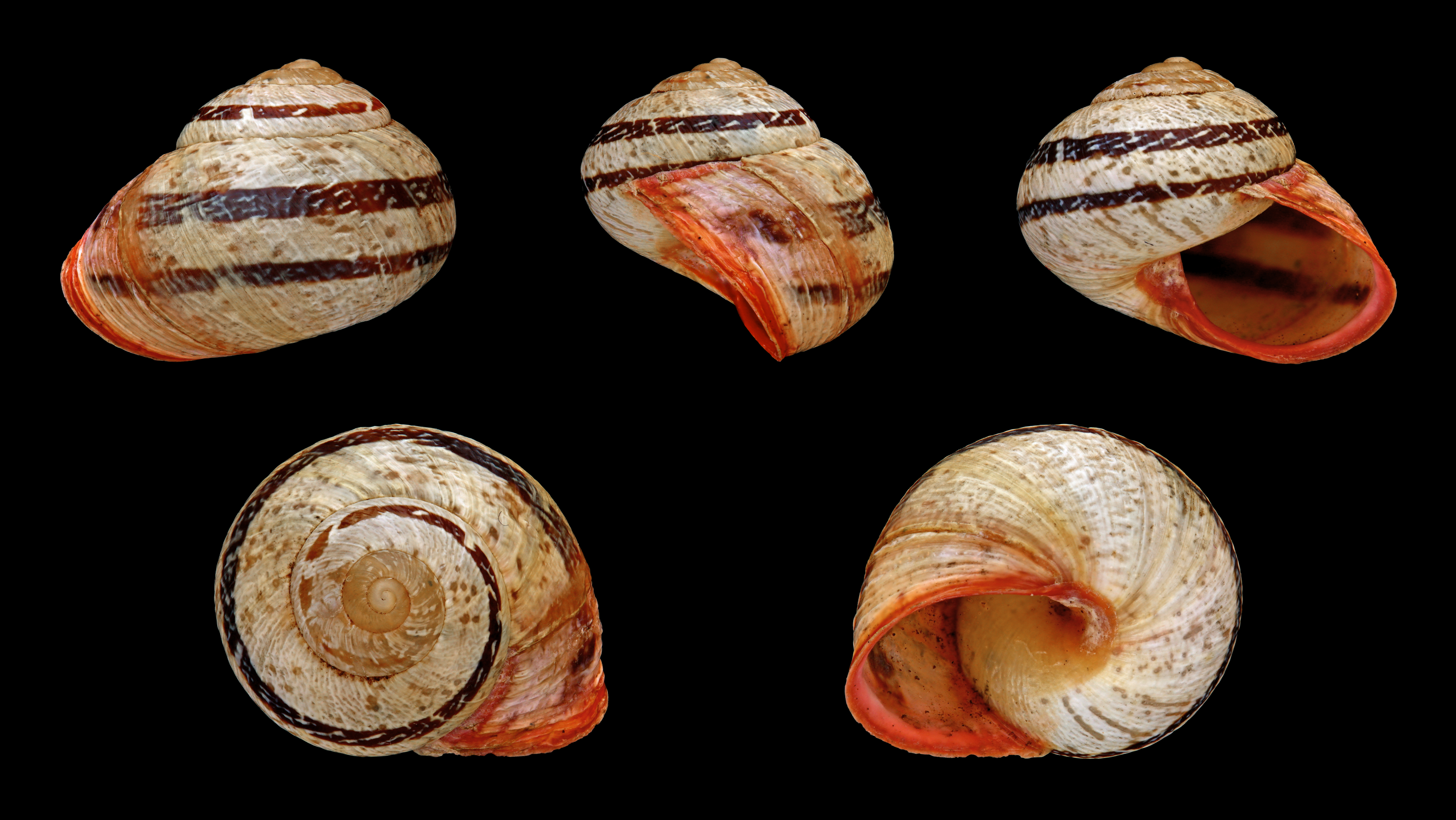

Scientific classification
- Domain: Eukaryota
- Kingdom: Animalia
- Phylum: Mollusca
- Class: Gastropoda
- Order: Stylommatophora
- Family: Hygromiidae
- Genus: Leptaxis
- Species: L. erubescens

Binomial name
- Leptaxis erubescens Lowe, 1831

= Leptaxis erubescens =

Species of land snail gastropod

Leptaxis erubescens is a species of air-breathing land snail, a terrestrial pulmonate gastropod mollusc in the family Helicidae, the typical snails.

== Anatomy ==
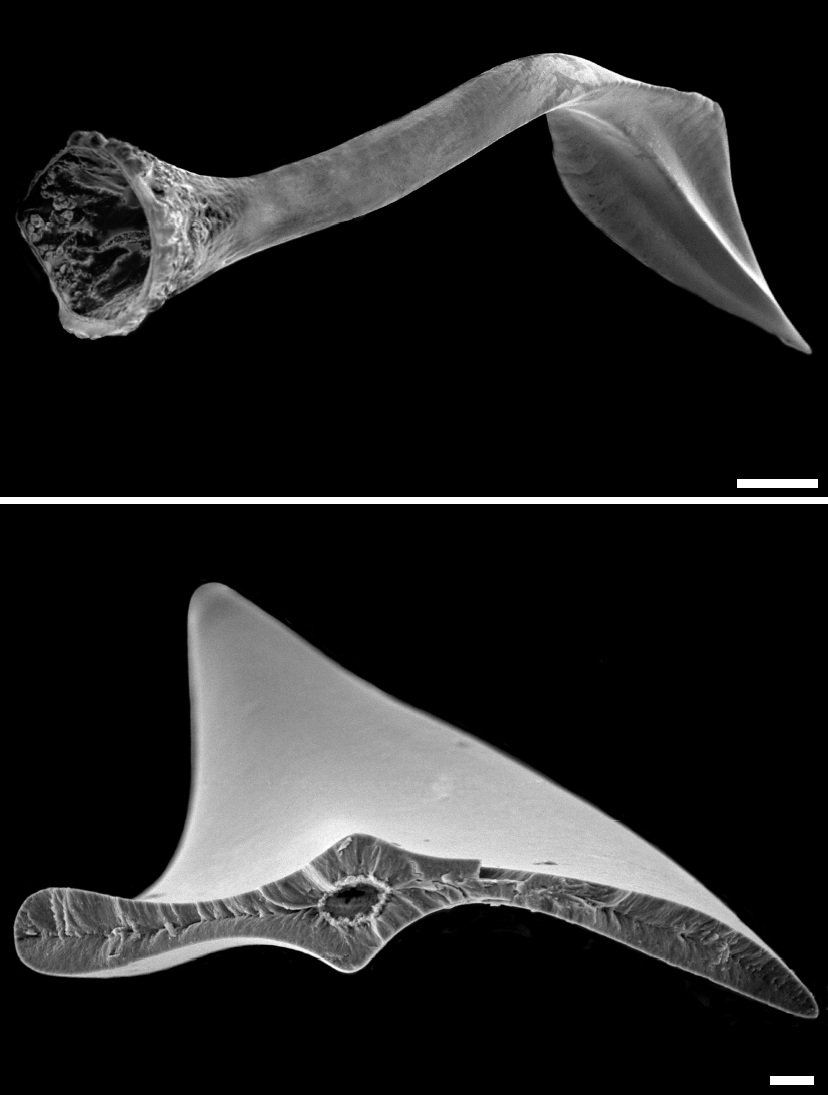

These snails create and use love darts as part of their mating behavior. The scanning electron microscope images shown are as follows: the upper image shows the lateral view of the dart, scale bar is 500 μm (0.5 mm). The lower image show the cross-section of the darts; the scale bar is 50 μm.
