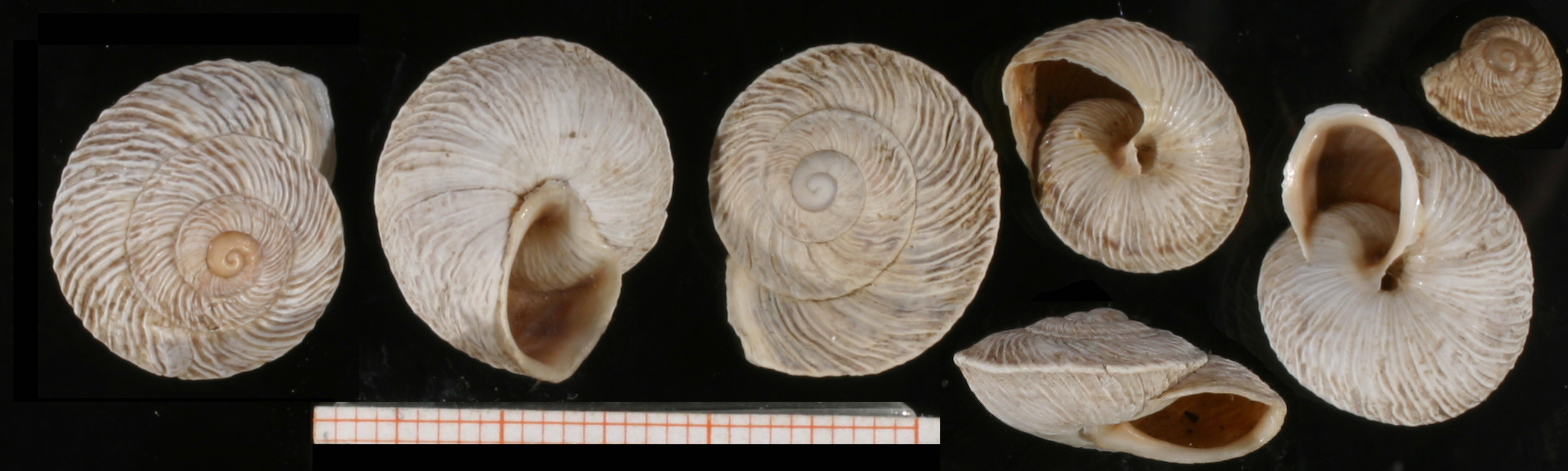

Scientific classification
- Kingdom: Animalia
- Phylum: Mollusca
- Class: Gastropoda
- Order: Stylommatophora
- Family: Helicidae
- Genus: Marmorana
- Species: M. scabriuscula

Binomial name
- Marmorana scabriuscula (Deshayes, 1830)

= Marmorana scabriuscula =

Species of gastropod

Marmorana scabriuscula is a species of air-breathing land snail, a terrestrial pulmonate gastropod mollusc in the family Helicidae.

== Distribution ==
This species is endemic to northwest Sicily.

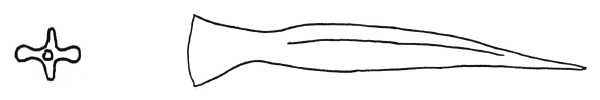
Love dart of Marmorana scabriuscula

== Anatomy ==
Species within this genus create and use love darts as part of their mating behavior.
