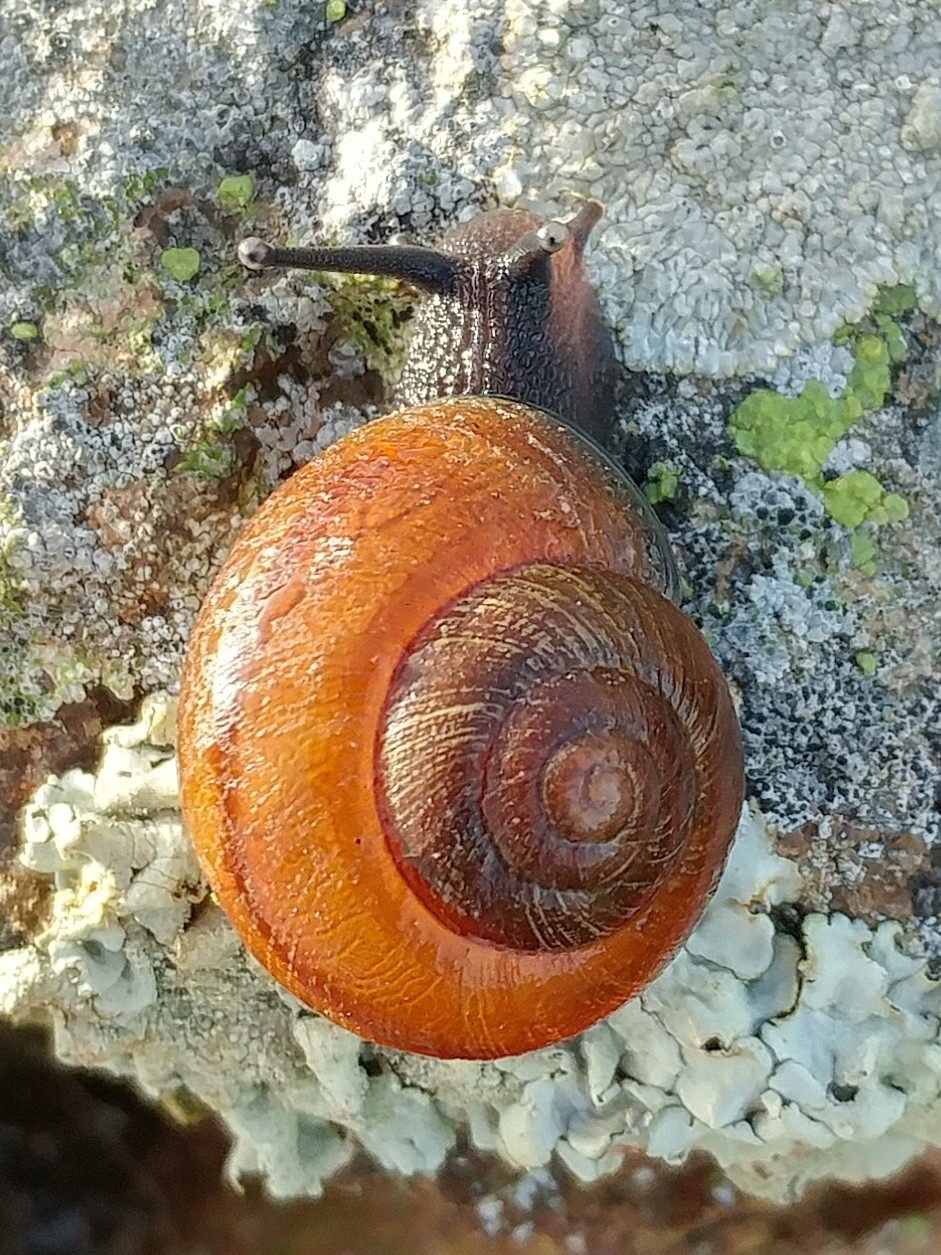

Conservation status
- Vulnerable (IUCN 2.3)

- Critically Imperiled (NatureServe)

Scientific classification
- Kingdom: Animalia
- Phylum: Mollusca
- Class: Gastropoda
- Order: Stylommatophora
- Family: Xanthonychidae
- Genus: Xerarionta
- Species: X. redimita

Binomial name
- Xerarionta redimita (W.G. Binney, 1858)

= Wreathed cactus snail =

Species of gastropod

The wreathed cactus snail (Xerarionta redimita) is a species of air-breathing land snail, a terrestrial pulmonate gastropod mollusc in the family Helminthoglyptidae. This species is endemic to the United States.
