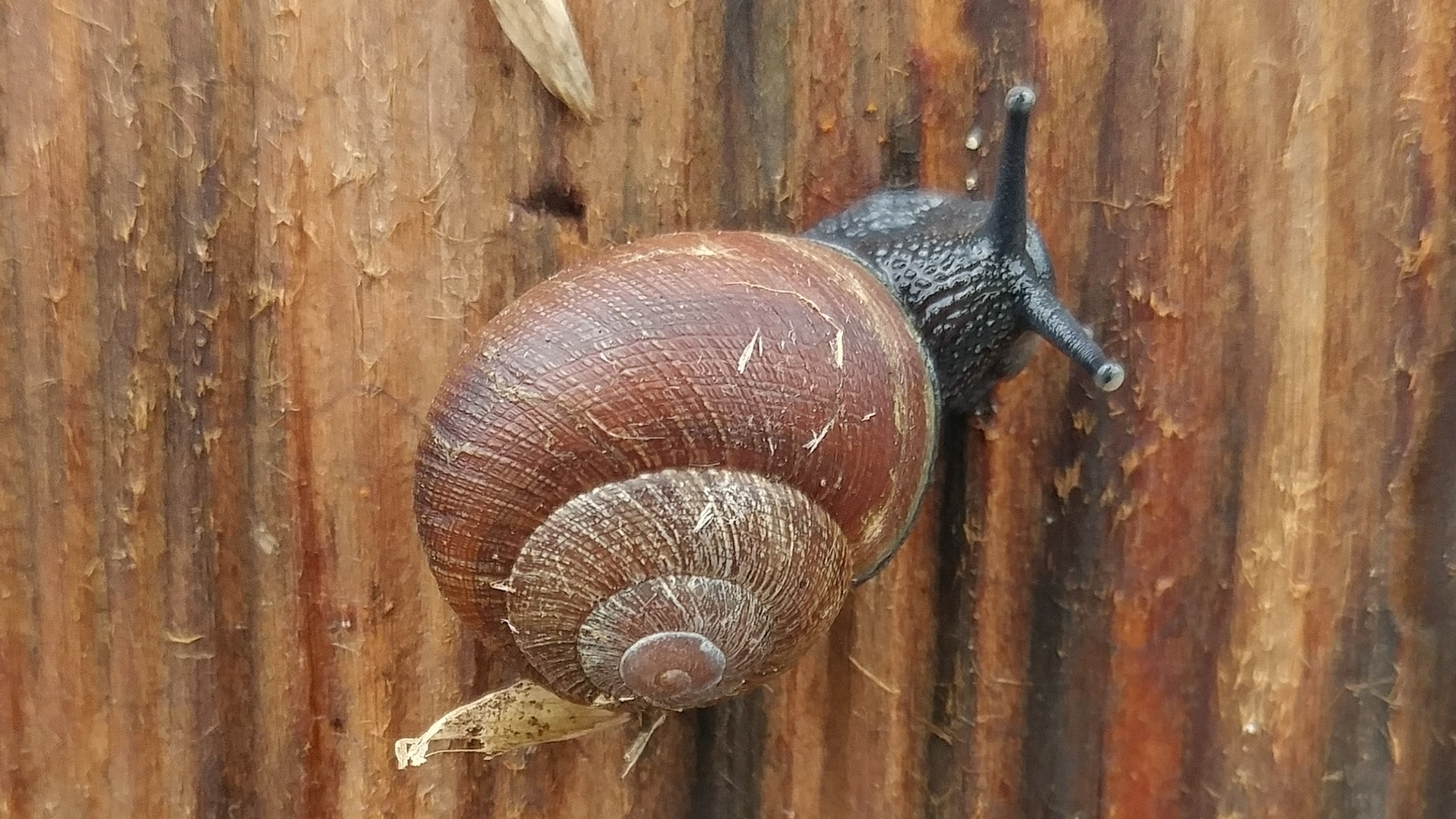

Conservation status
- Vulnerable (IUCN 2.3)

- Critically Imperiled (NatureServe)

Scientific classification
- Kingdom: Animalia
- Phylum: Mollusca
- Class: Gastropoda
- Order: Stylommatophora
- Family: Xanthonychidae
- Genus: Xerarionta
- Species: X. intercisa

Binomial name
- Xerarionta intercisa (W.G. Binney, 1857)

= Plain cactus snail =

Species of gastropod

The plain cactus snail, scientific name Xerarionta intercisa, is a species of air-breathing land snail, a terrestrial pulmonate gastropod mollusk in the family Helminthoglyptidae. It is endemic to the United States.
