= Love dart =

Method of snail reproduction

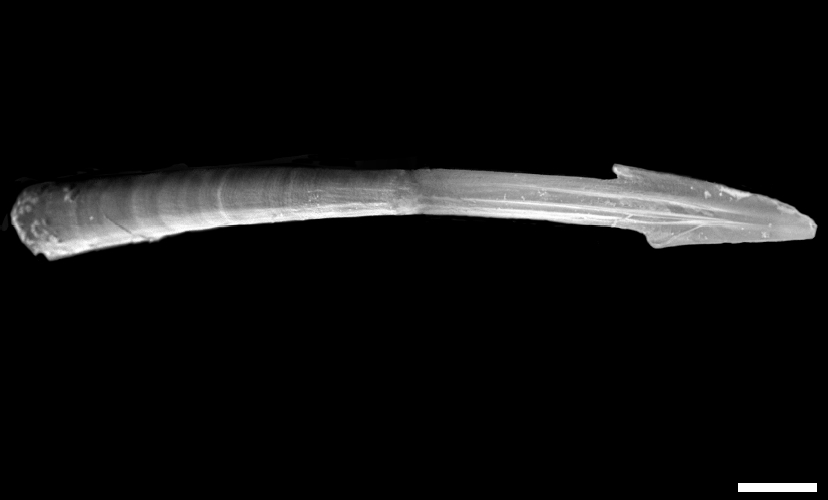
SEM image of lateral view of a love dart of the land snail Monachoides vicinus. The scale bar is 500 μm (0.5 mm).

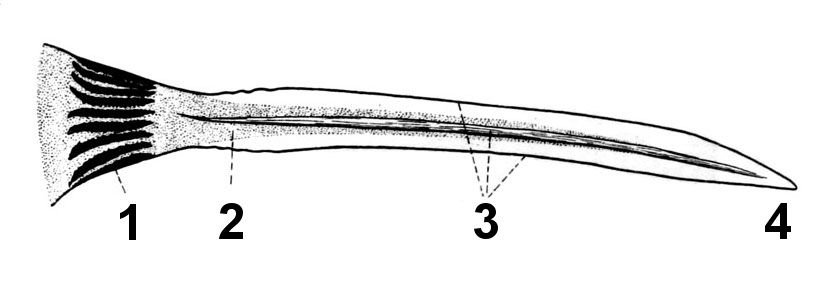
Drawing showing a side view of the love dart of the snail Helix pomatia. 1 = flared base of the dart. 2 = position of the inner cavity. 3 = longitudinal flanges or vanes. 4 = sharp tip or blade of the dart

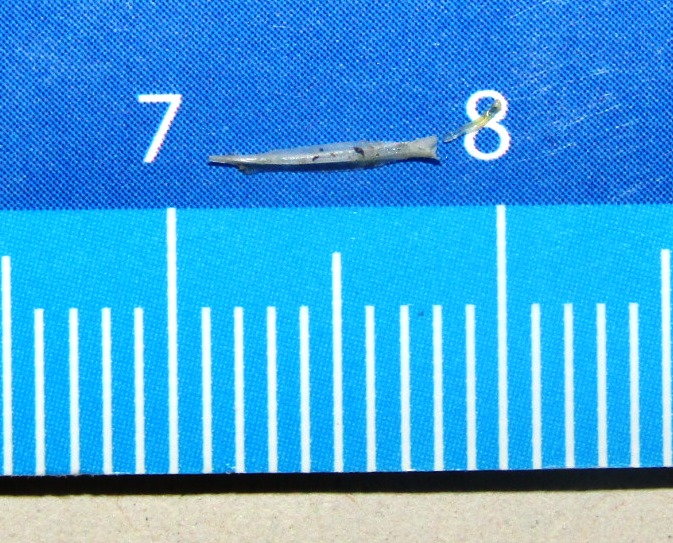
A love dart from Cornu aspersum (garden snail) on a ruler for comparison, showing its length of 7 mm (0.28 in).

A love dart (also known as a gypsobelum, shooting darts, or just as darts) is a sharp, calcareous or chitinous dart which some hermaphroditic land snails and slugs create. Love darts are both formed and stored internally in a dart sac. These darts are made in sexually mature animals only, and are used as part of the sequence of events during courtship, before actual mating takes place. Darts are quite large compared to the size of the animal: in the case of the semi-slug genus Parmarion, the length of a dart can be up to one fifth that of the semi-slug's foot.

The process of using love darts in snails is a form of sexual selection. Prior to copulation, each of the two snails (or slugs) attempts to "shoot" one (or more) darts into the other snail (or slug). There is no organ to receive the dart; this action is more analogous to stabbing, or to being shot with an arrow or flechette. The dart does not fly through the air to reach its target, but is "fired" as a contact shot.

The love dart is not a penial stylet (in other words, it is not an accessory organ for sperm transfer). The exchange of sperm between both of the two land snails is a completely separate part of the mating progression. Nevertheless, recent research shows that use of the dart can strongly favor the reproductive outcome for the snail that is able to lodge a dart in its partner. This is because mucus on the dart contains an allomone (pheromone-like) compound that promotes sperm preservation mechanisms.

Love darts are shaped in many distinctive ways, which vary considerably between species. What all the shapes of love darts have in common is their harpoon-like or needle-like ability to pierce.

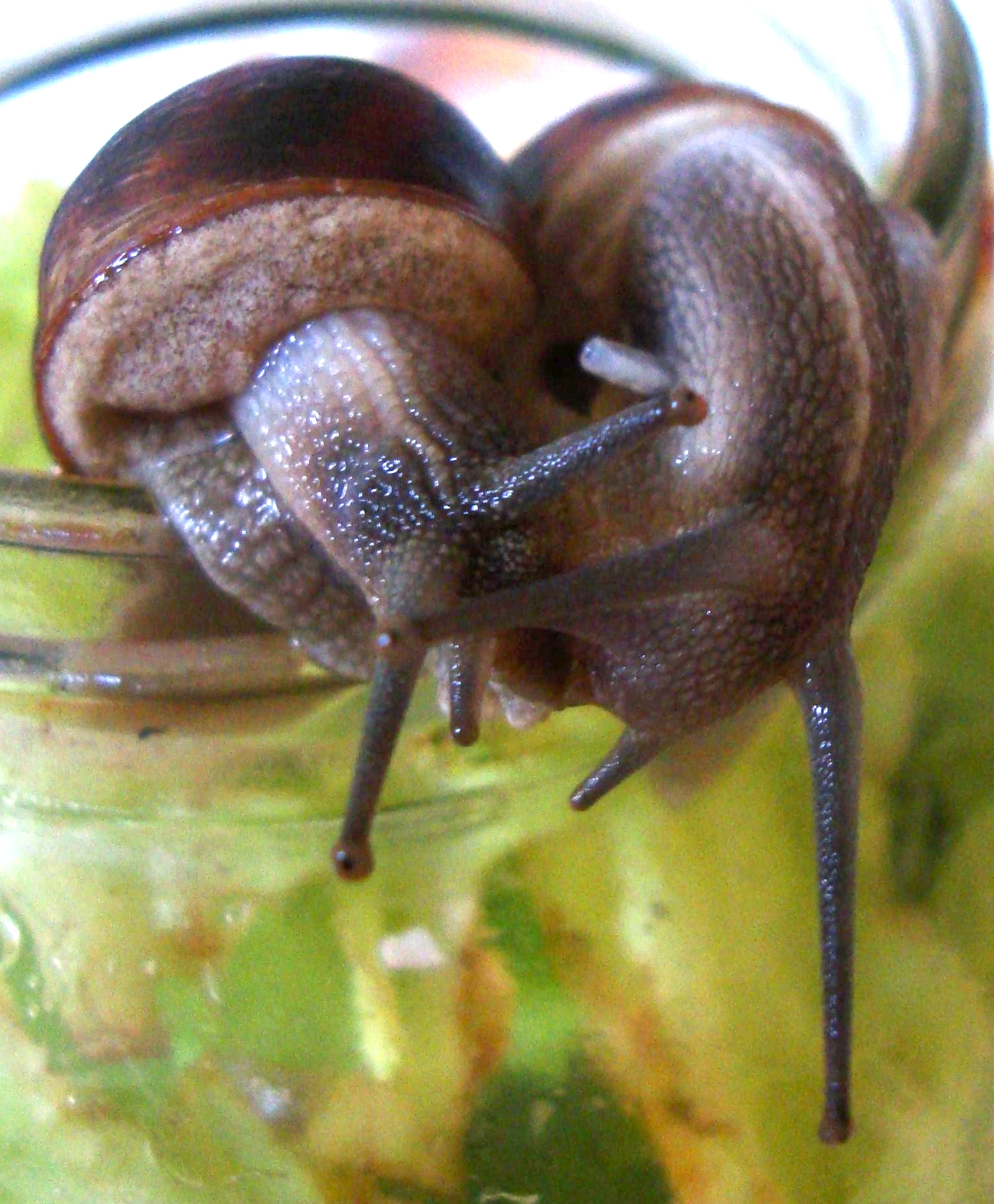
Courting Cornu aspersum snails in Ireland; the one on the right has a fired love dart embedded in its body.

== The mating dance ==
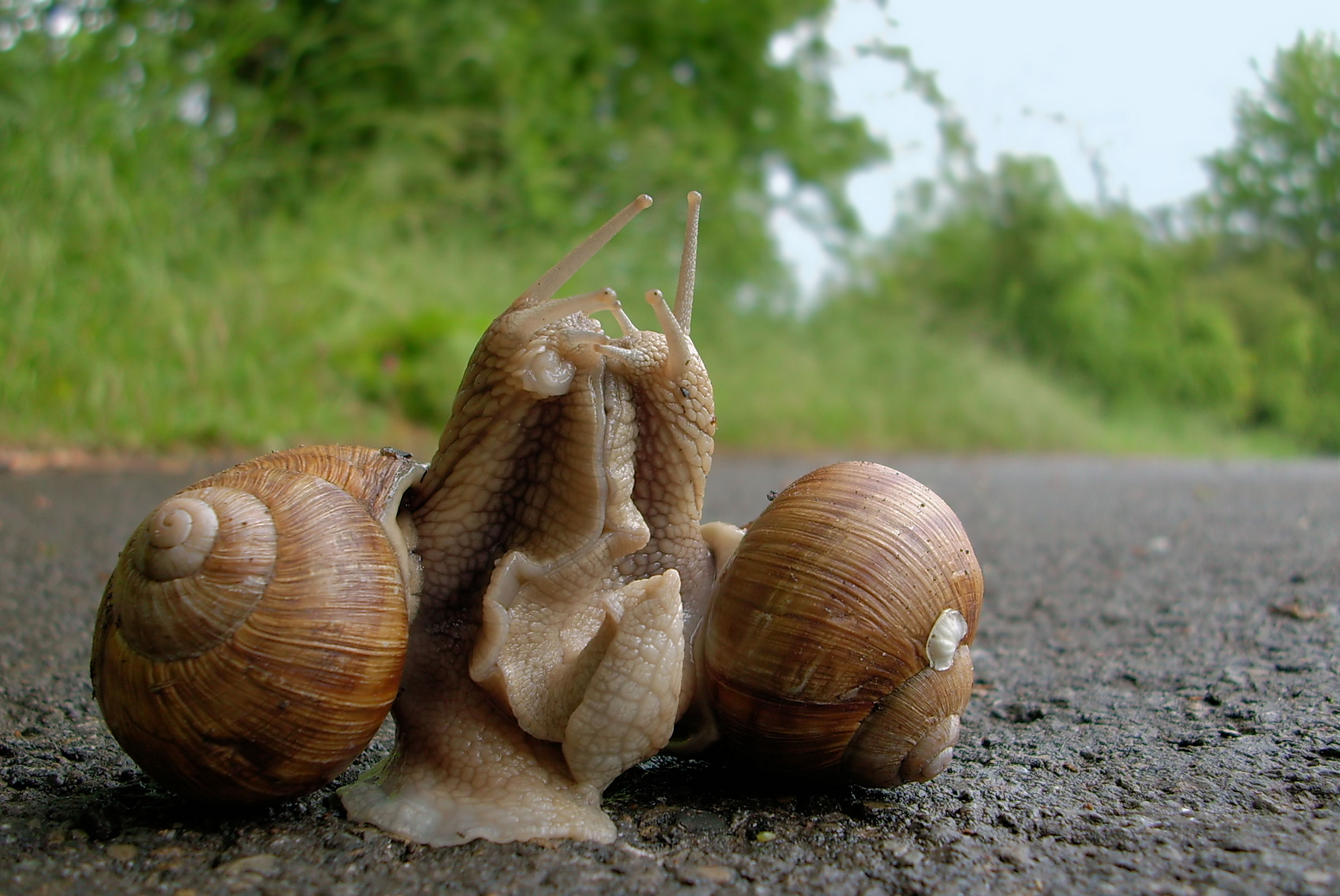
Courtship in the snail, Helix pomatia

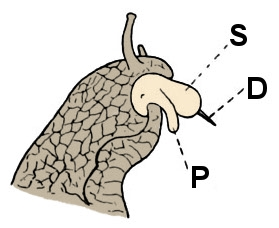
Drawing of the head of a Helix pomatia prior to mating, showing the everted penis, and the dart sac in the process of shooting a love dart. S – dart sac (bursa telae). D – love dart. P – penis

Mating begins with a courting ritual. For example, in land snails of the genus Helix, including the escargot Helix pomatia, and the common garden snail Helix aspersa (also known as Cornu aspersum and Cantareus aspersus), copulation is preceded by an elaborate tactile courtship.

The two snails circle around each other for up to six hours, touching with their tentacles, and biting lips and the area of the genital pore, which shows some preliminary signs of the eversion of the penis. As the snails approach mating, hydraulic pressure builds up in the blood sinus surrounding the organ housing the dart. Each snail manoeuvres to get its genital pore in the best position, close to the other snail's body. Then, when the body of one snail touches the other snail's genital pore, it triggers the firing of the dart.

The darting can sometimes be so forceful that the dart ends up buried in the internal organs. It can also happen that a dart will pierce the body or head entirely, and protrude on the other side.

After both snails have fired their darts, the snails copulate and exchange sperm.

A snail does not have a dart to fire the very first time it mates, because the first mating is necessary to trigger the process of dart formation. Once a snail has mated, it fires a dart before some, but not all, subsequent matings. A snail often mates without having a dart to use, because it takes time to create a replacement dart. In the case of the garden snail Cornu aspersum, it takes a week for a new dart to form.

The dart is shot with some variation in force, and with considerable inaccuracy, such that one-third of the darts that are fired in Cornu aspersum either fail to penetrate the skin, or miss the target altogether. Snails have only very simple visual systems and cannot see well enough to use vision to help aim the darts.

== Function ==
- Love dart of Helix aspersa in action

Although the existence and use of love darts in snails has been known for at least several centuries, until recently the actual function of love darts was not properly understood. It was long assumed that the darts had some sort of "stimulating" function, and served to make copulation more likely. It was also suggested that darts might be a "gift" of calcium. These theories have proved to be incorrect.

Recent research has led to a new understanding of the function of love darts: manipulating the recipient's snail's sperm collection mechanism, thus increasing the chances of paternity for the sender. A close look into the behavior of Cornu aspersum shows that this is achieved not by the mechanical action of the dart as it penetrates the recipient's skin, but by the mucus that coats the dart: The mucus carries an allohormone that is transferred into the recipient's hemolymph when the dart is inserted, which reconfigures the recipient's reproductive system: the bursa copulatrix (sperm digestion organ) becomes closed off, and the copulatory canal (leading to the sperm storage) is opened. This reconfiguration allows more sperm to access the sperm storage area and fertilize eggs, rather than being digested, ultimately increasing the sender's chances of paternity.

== Morphology of darts ==
The love dart, also known as a "gypsobelum", is often made of calcium carbonate which is secreted by a specialized organ within the reproductive system of several families of air-breathing snails and slugs, mainly in terrestrial pulmonate gastropod mollusks within the clade Stylommatophora.

Darts can range in size from about 30 millimetres (1.2 in) long in the larger snail species, down to about 1 millimetre (0.04 in) in the smallest snails that have darts. Typically most darts are less than 5 millimetres (0.20 in) long, but they are substantial compared with the size of the animal.

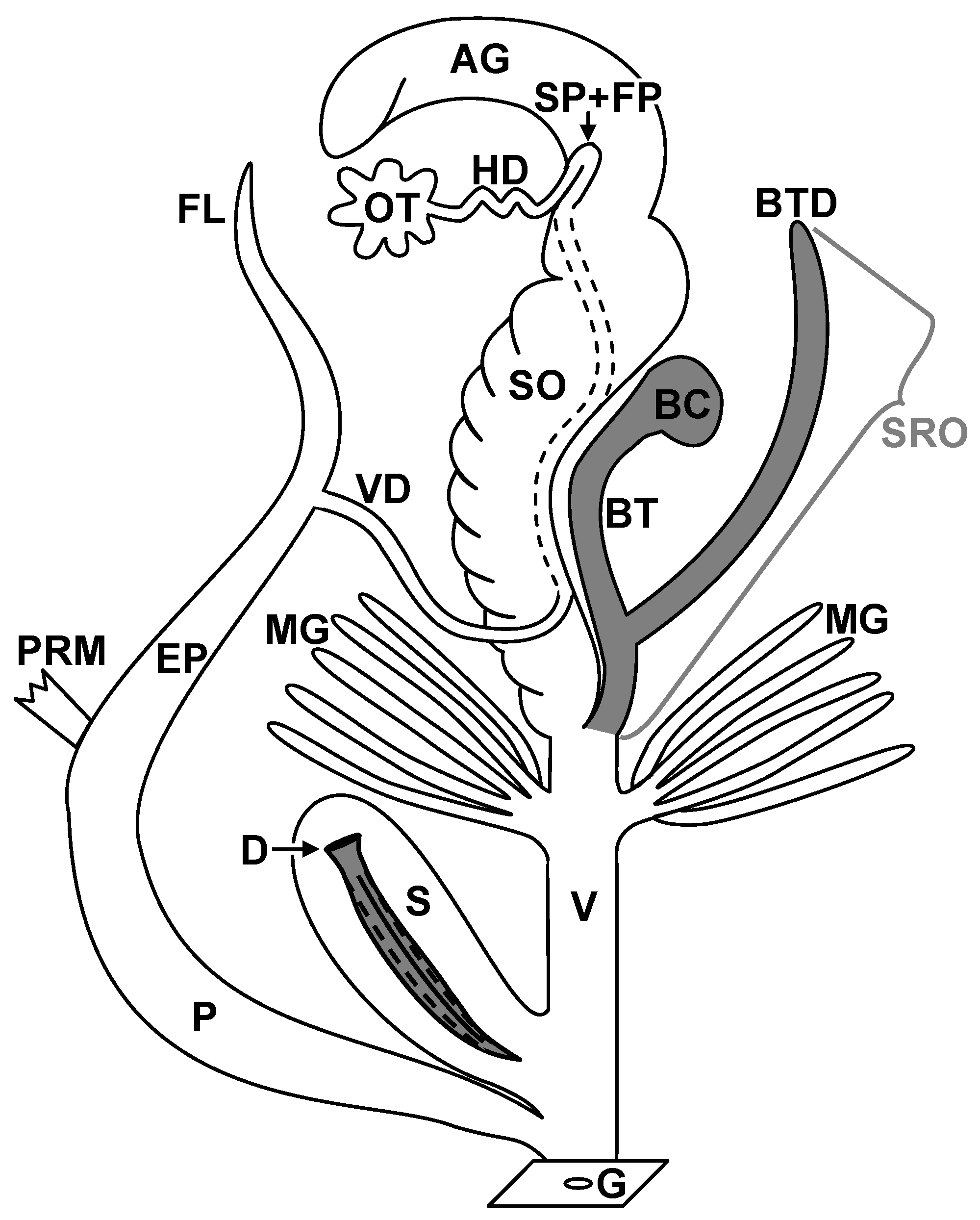
Simplified diagram of the reproductive system of a pulmonate land snail. D = love dart; S = stylophore or dart sac (bursa telae); P = penis; V = vagina; G = genital pore; MG = mucous glands

There is considerable variety in both the overall shape and the cross section of the love dart. The morphology (shape and form) of the dart is species-specific. For example, individual snails of the two rather similar helicid species Cepaea hortensis and Cepaea nemoralis can sometimes only be distinguished by examining the shape of the love dart and the vaginal mucous glands (which in the anatomical diagram are marked "MG" and are positioned off the structure marked "V".)

== Anatomical context ==
The taxonomic placement of all the families mentioned in this article follows the taxonomy of the Gastropoda by Bouchet & Rocroi (2005).

There is a complex hermaphroditic reproductive system in pulmonate snails (those snails that have a lung rather than a gill or gills.) Their reproductive system is completely internal, except for the active protrusion (eversion) of the penis for copulation. The outer opening of the reproductive system is called the "genital pore"; it is positioned on the right hand side, very close to the head of the animal. This opening is virtually invisible however, unless it is actively in use.

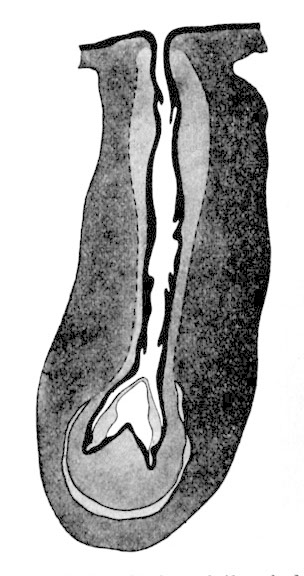
Drawing of a transverse section of the dart sac (also known as the bursa telae) of Helix pomatia during the process of creating a new love dart

The love dart is created and stored before use in a highly muscular internal anatomical structure known as the stylophore or dart sac (also known as the bursa telae). The exact positioning of the stylophore varies, but it is in the vicinity of the eversible penis and the vagina, where these two structures open into the "atrium", a common area right inside the genital pore.

The opening of the stylophore leads directly into the atrium in certain species in the families Vitrinidae, Parmacellidae, Helminthoglyptidae, Bradybaenidae, Urocyclidae, Ariophantidae, and Dyakiidae. The opening of the stylophore can instead lead to the penis, as is the case in some species of Aneitinae (a subfamily of Athoracophoridae), Sagdidae, Euconulidae, Gastrodontidae and Onchidiidae. Alternatively, it can lead to the vagina, as in the case in some species of Ariopeltinae (a subfamily of Oopeltidae), Ariolimacinae (a subfamily of Ariolimacidae), Philomycidae, other species within the Bradybaenidae, and also in the Hygromiidae, Helicidae and Dyakiidae.

Only two families have darts present in every species: the Bradybaenidae and in the Dyakiidae. In all the other families there is reduction or loss of dart-making ability in some of the species.

Many species have only one dart sac, however other species have several. Snails in the family Bradybaenidae have more than one dart sac, and some species of Hygromiidae and Helmintoglyptidae have four dart sacs. Some Urocyclidae have up to 70 darts.

== Occurrence within the pulmonate snails and slugs ==
All pulmonate land snails are hermaphrodites, and have a complete and rather elaborate set of both male and female reproductive organs (see the simplified anatomical diagram above), but the majority of pulmonate land snails have no love darts and no dart sac.

=== Calcareous darts ===
Calcareous (composed of calcium carbonate) darts are found in a limited number of pulmonate families within the Stylommatophora.

Most of these families are within the land snail superfamily Helicoidea: Helicidae, Bradybaenidae, Helminthoglyptidae, Hygromiidae, and Humboldtianidae (previously considered to be a part of the Hygromiidae). In Helix pomatia, the calcium carbonate structure is aragonite.

Calcium carbonate darts are also found in the family Zonitidae within the superfamily Zonitoidea, and in one family of slugs, the Philomycidae, which are within the superfamily Arionoidea.

Lightly calcified darts occur in the snail and semi-slug family Urocyclidae within the superfamily Helicarionoidea.

=== Chitinous darts ===
Chitinous (composed of chitin) love darts occur in the pulmonate land snail families Ariophantidae (superfamily Helicarionoidea), in the family Helicarionidae (superfamily Helicarionoidea), in the Vitrinidae (superfamily Limacoidea), and in the slug family Parmacellidae (superfamily Parmacelloidea).

Within the more ancient clade Systellommatophora, chitin darts are found in the pulmonate sea slugs of the family Onchidiidae, in the superfamily Onchidioidea.

=== Cartilaginous darts ===
Love darts made of cartilage occur in the family Gastrodontidae.

== Evolution of love darts ==
Because of the presence of darts in many superfamilies of the Stylommatophora, it seems likely that love darts appeared during the early evolution of the Pulmonata and that the ancestors of the Stylommatophora possessed darts already.

During evolution, darts appear to have been lost secondarily, i.e., after they had evolved and been functional. Vestigial darts (ones that exist only in a rudimentary condition) occur in the family Sagdidae, and in many Helicoidea, the surrounding organs have also degenerated (become non-functional). The sarcobelum is a fleshy or cuticle-coated papilla which is considered to be a degenerated, previously dart-bearing, organ.

== Species variability ==
Love darts are shaped in many distinctive ways and vary considerably between species. The morphology of the dart is almost always species-specific.

Some darts have a round cross section, others are bladed or vaned. In some cases the blades on the sides of the dart are bifurcated or divided into two parts. Some darts are shaped like a needle or a thorn, others have a tip like an arrowhead, or look like a dagger. What all the shapes have in common is their ability to pierce.

=== Images ===
Note: both the scanning electron micrographs (SEMs) and the drawings below are taken from, or modified from, Koene & Schulenburg, 2005.

Below are SEM images of love darts from eight different species of pulmonate land snails. The upper images show a lateral view, where the scale bar is 500 μm (= 0.5 mm). The lower images show a cross-section, where the scale bar is 50 μm (= 0.05 mm).

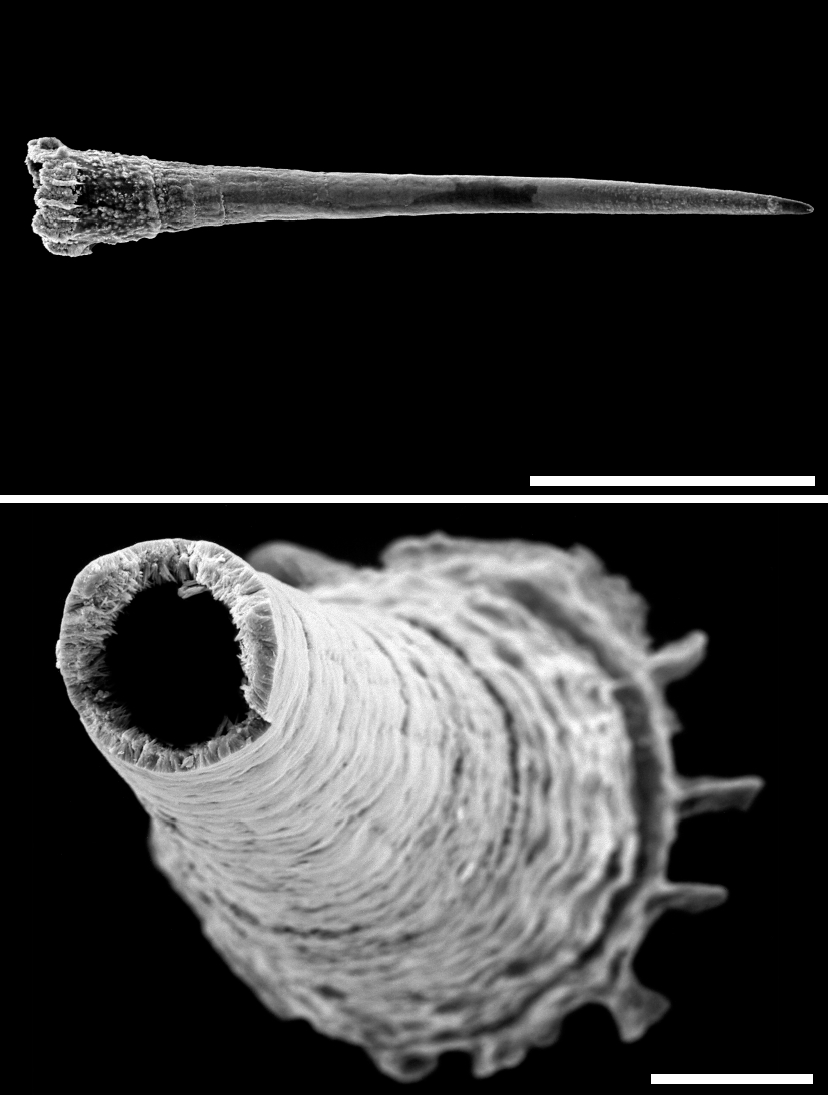
Trichia hispida

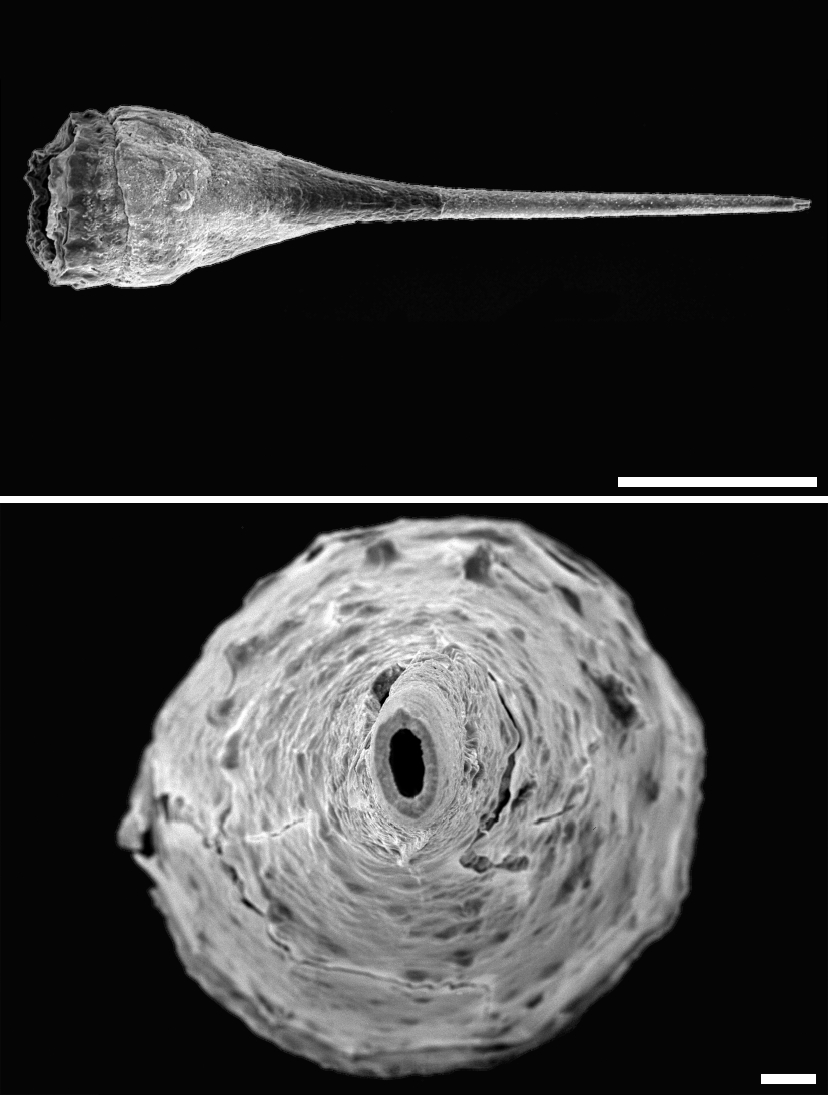
Xerarionta kellettii

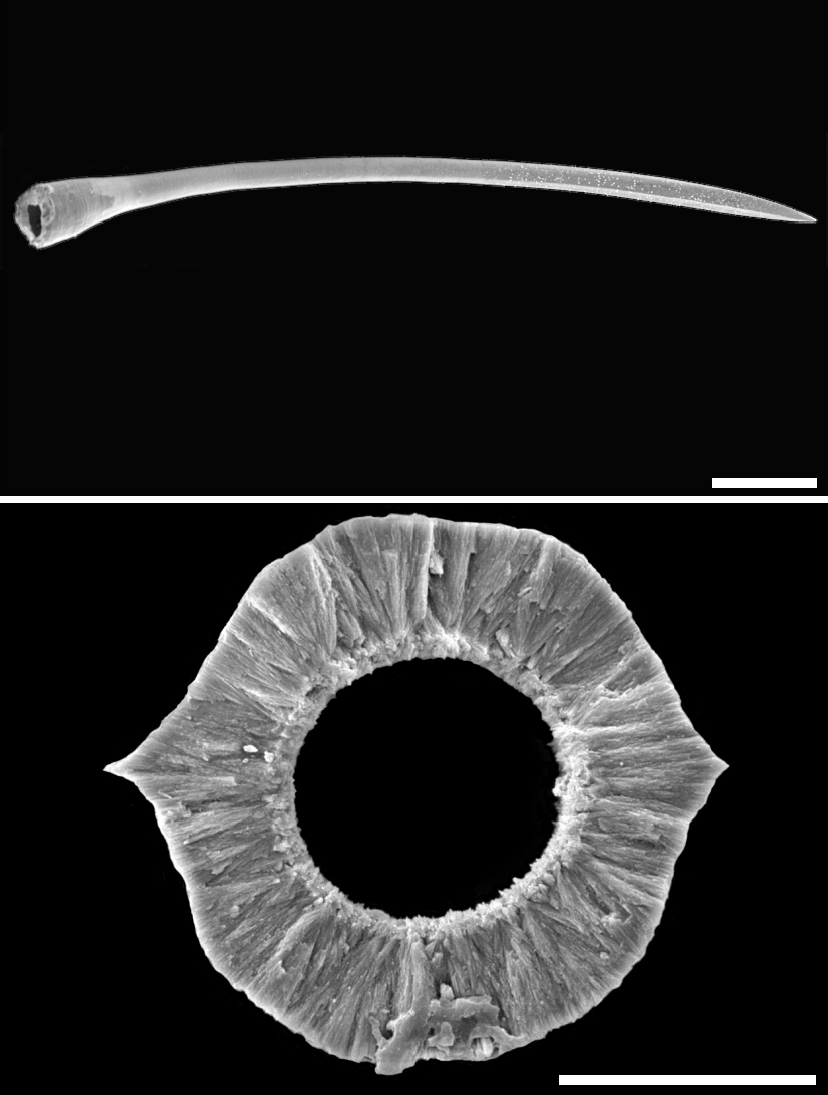
Bradybaena similaris

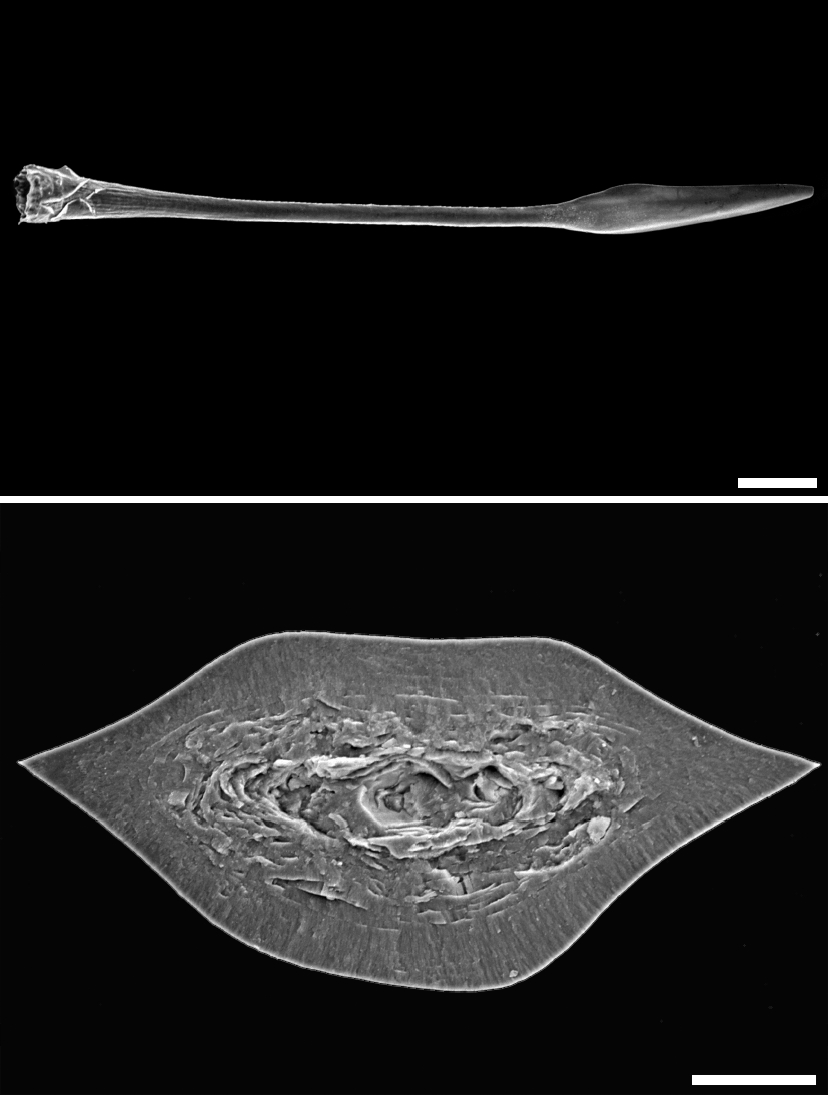
Chilostoma cingulatum

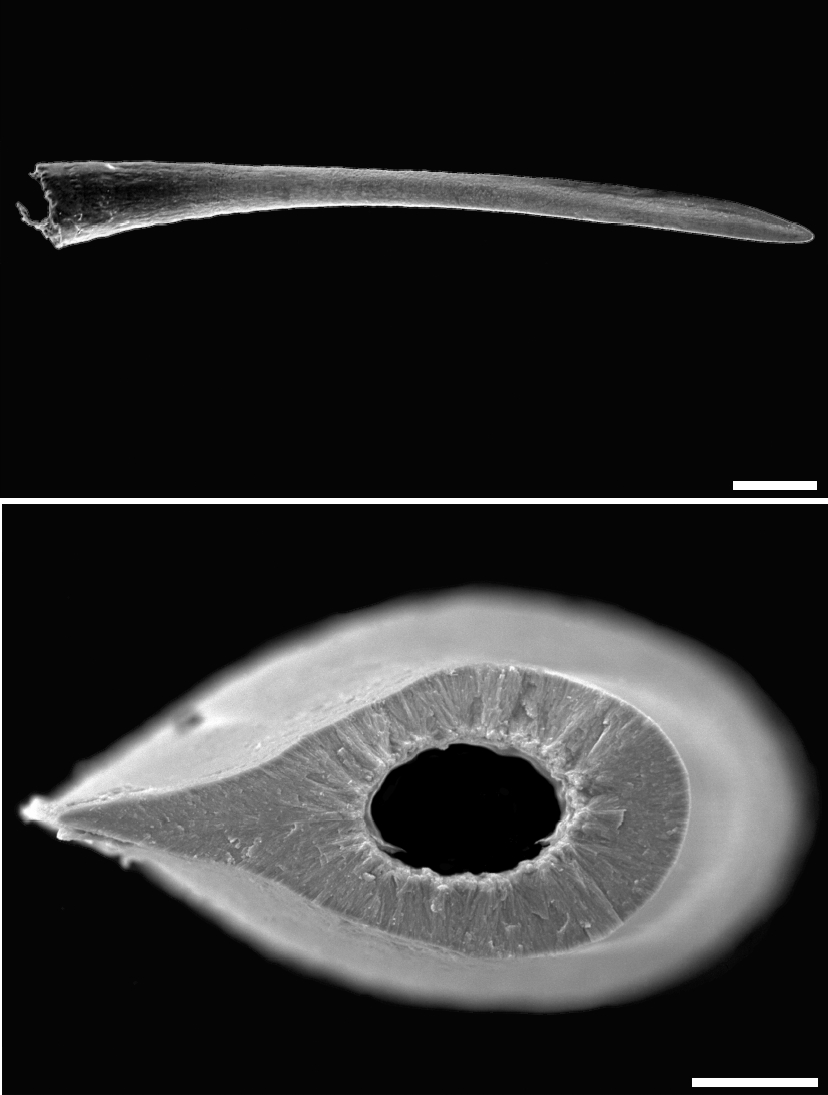
Humboldtiana nuevoleonis

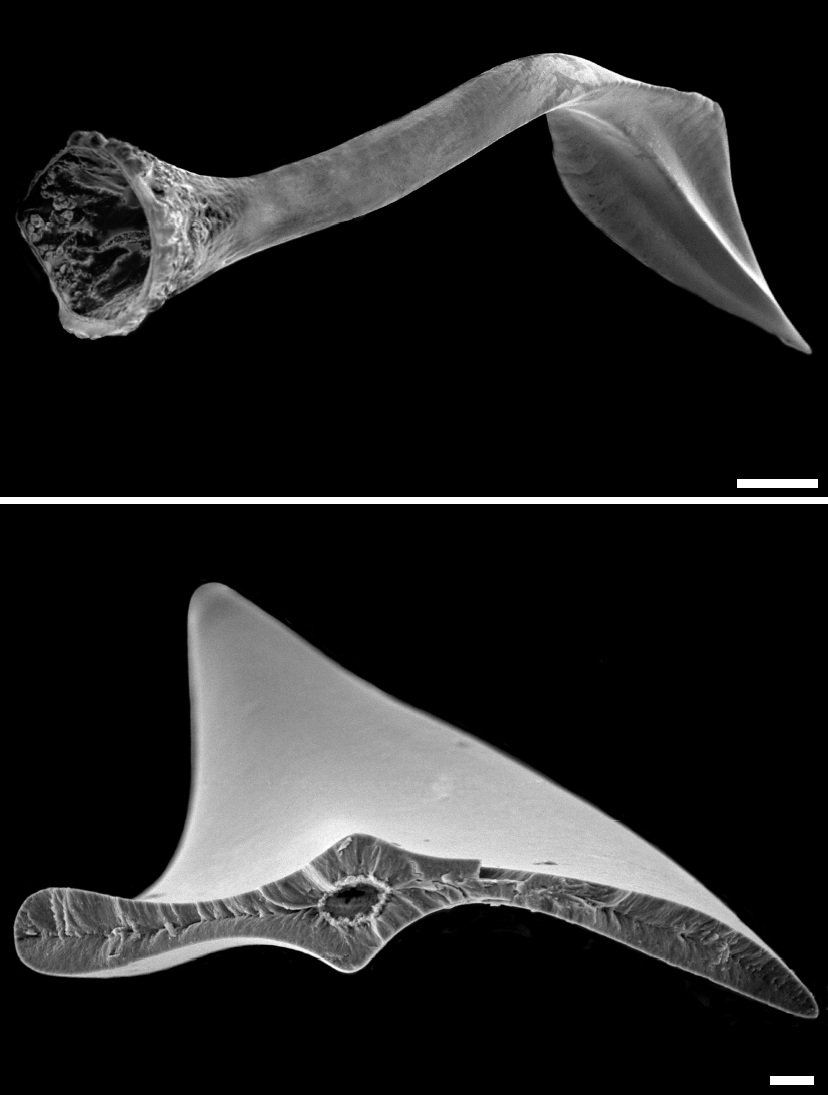
Leptaxis erubescens

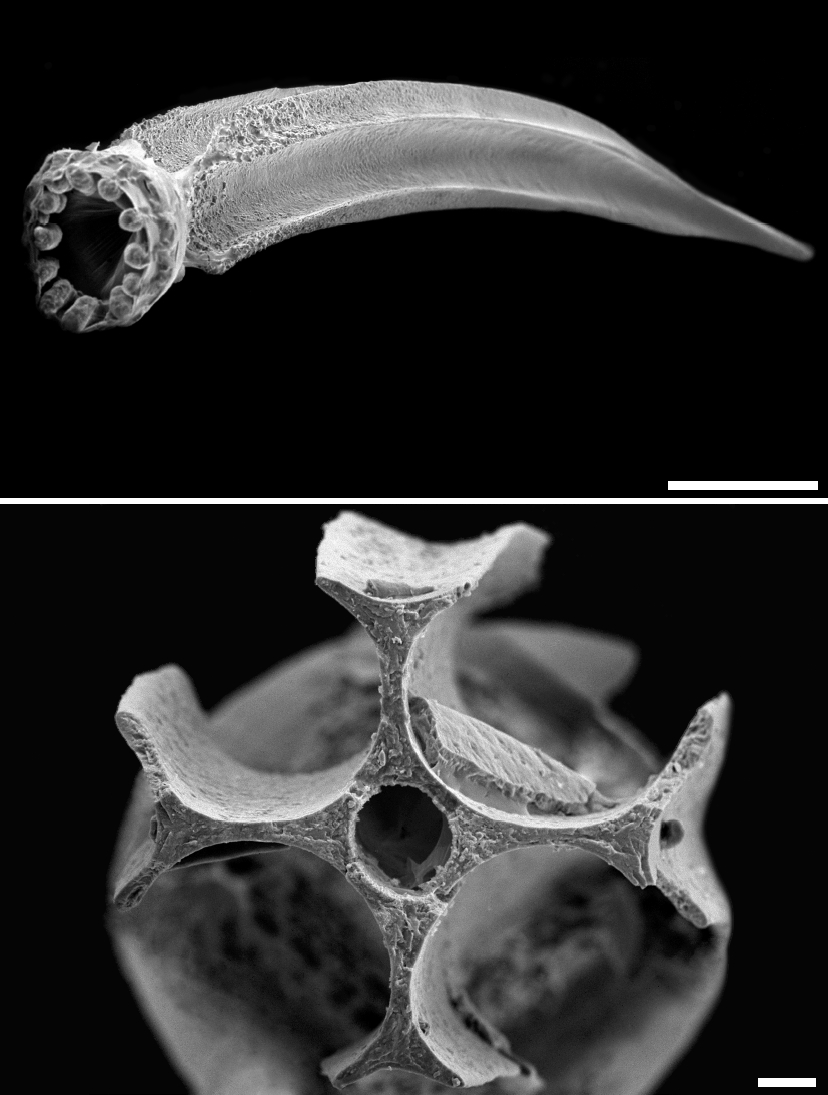
Cepaea hortensis

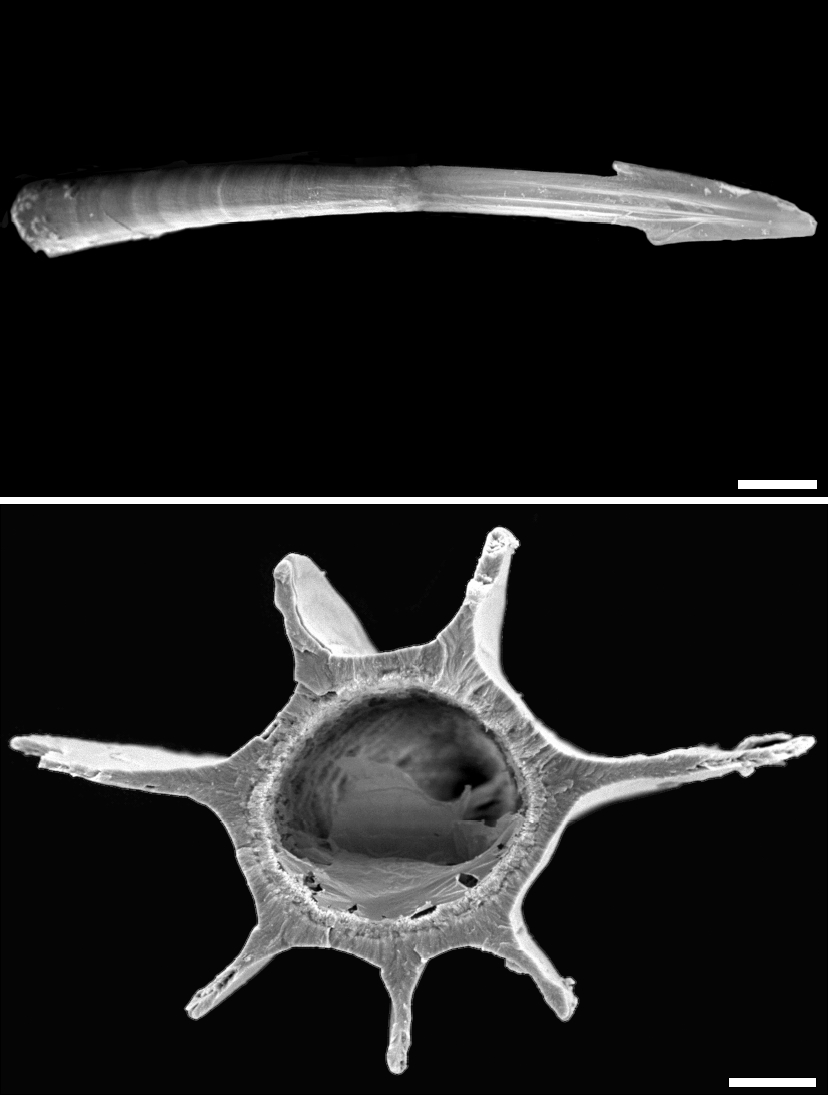
Monachoides vicinus

The following tables or charts show numerous examples of love dart morphology, on a family-by-family and species-by-species basis. Not all families and species are included. The drawings show first the cross section, and then the lateral view of the dart in that particular species. Darts vary in size according to the size of the snail or slug species, but here they are all shown at the same size, for purposes of comparison.

==== Helicidae ====
Shape of love dart	Species	References
	Arianta arbustorum	
	Cepaea hortensis (also shown in the SEM images)	
	Cepaea nemoralis	
	Chilostoma cingulatum (also shown in the SEM images)	
	Chilostoma glaciale	
	Chilostoma planospira	
	Eobania vermiculata	
	Helicigona lapicida	
	Helix aperta = Cantareus apertus	
(more images)	Cornu aspersum = Cantareus aspersus	
	Helix lucorum	
	Helix lutescens	
(another image)	Helix pomatia	and many other works
	Leptaxis nivosa and Leptaxis undata	
	Leptaxis erubescens (also shown in the SEM images)	
	Marmorana scabriuscula	
	Marmorana serpentina	
	Otala lactea	
	Theba pisana	

==== Elonidae ====
Shape of love dart	Species	References
	Elona quimperiana	
	Norelona pyrenaica	

==== Bradybaenidae ====
Shape of love dart	Species	References
	Aegista vulgivaga	
	Bradybaena similaris (also shown in the SEM images)	
	Euhadra amaliae	
	Euhadra quaesita	
	Euhadra sandai	
	Fruticicola fruticum	

==== Helminthoglyptidae ====
Shape of love dart	Species	References
	Helminthoglypta nickliniana	
	Helminthoglypta tudiculata	
	Monadenia fidelis	
	Polymita picta	
	Xerarionta kellettii	

==== Hygromiidae ====
Shape of love dart	Species	References
	Cernuella cisalpina	
	Cernuella hydruntina	
	Cernuella virgata	
	Helicella itala Each snail in this species has 2 darts	
	Hygromia cinctella	
	Monachoides incarnatus = Perforatella incarnata	
	Monachoides vicinus (also shown in the SEM images)	
	Perforatella bidentata	
	Pseudotrichia rubiginosa	
	Trochulus hispidus = Trichia hispida (also shown in the SEM images) Each snail in this species has 2 darts	
	Trochulus striolatus = Trichia striolata Each snail in this species has 2 darts	
	Xeromunda durieui	
	Xerosecta cespitum	
	Xerotricha conspurcata	

==== Humboldtianidae ====
Shape of love dart	Species	References
	Humboldtiana nuevoleonis (also shown in the SEM images) Each snail in this species has 2 darts	

==== Ariophantidae ====
Shape of love dart	Species	References
reproductive system, d = dart sac	Ariophanta laevipes	

==== Ariophantidae ====
Shape of love dart	Species	References
	Parmarion sp.	

==== Philomycidae ====
Shape of love dart	Species	References
The dart is thick and curved.	Philomycus carolinianus	
	Philomycus togatus	
	Philomycus virginicus	

==== Urocyclidae ====
Some species in this family have spiral darts, and some darts have "minute barbs pointing toward the tip".

Shape of love dart	Species	References

==== Vitrinidae ====
Shape of love dart	Species	References

==== Parmacellidae ====
Species of slugs within this family have spiral darts.

Shape of love dart	Species	References

==== Gastrodontidae ====
Shape of love dart	Species	References
	Zonitoides arboreus	
image (with darts of other species)	Zonitoides sp. (This species was probably either Z. nitidus or Z. excavatus)	

== The Cupid connection ==
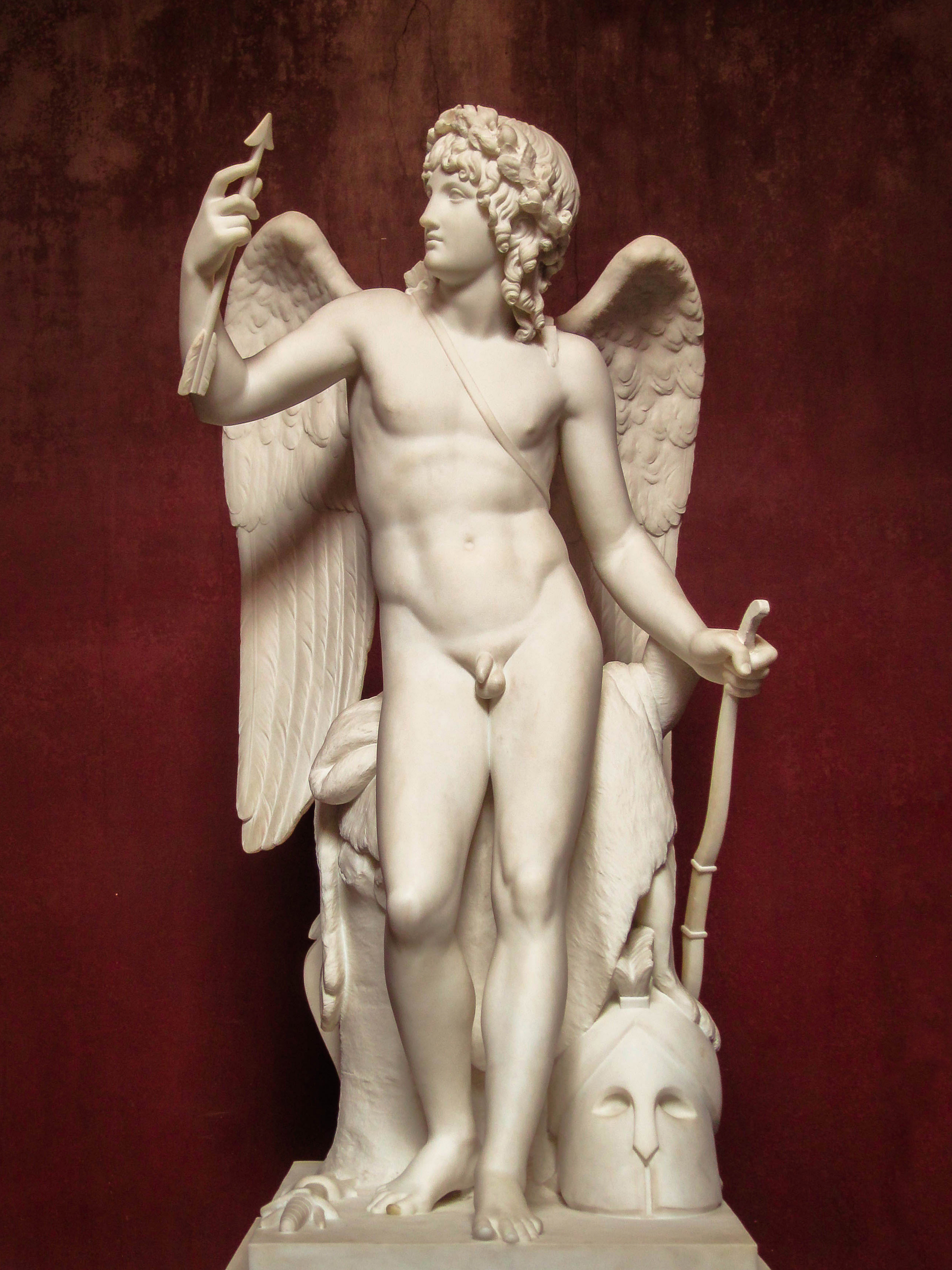
Cupid statue by Bertel Thorvaldsen

Some writers have commented on the parallel between the love darts of snails and the love darts fired by the Greek god Eros, called Cupid in Roman mythology. It is even possible that there is a connection between the behavior of the snails and the myth.

Malacologist (mollusk expert) Ronald Chase of McGill University said about the garden snail Cornu aspersum, "I believe the myth of Cupid and his arrows has its basis in this snail species, which is native to Greece". He added, "The Greeks probably knew about this behavior because they were pretty good naturalists and observers."

In some languages, the dart that these snails use before mating is known as an "arrow". For example, in German it is called a Liebespfeil or "love arrow", and in Czech it is šíp lásky (which means "arrow of love").

== Dart-like structures in other gastropod groups ==
=== The toxoglossans ===
Marine gastropods in the predatory superfamily Conoidea (known as the toxoglossans, meaning "poison tongue") use a poison dart or harpoon, which is a single modified radula tooth which is created inside the mouth of the snail, and which is primarily made of chitin. These snails are carnivorous hunters: the harpoon is used in predation. When the snail is close to its prey, it extends its proboscis a considerable distance; then it fires its harpoon and injects a toxin into the prey. For most species of toxoglossans the prey is marine worms, but in the case of some larger cone snails, the prey is small fish.

=== Opisthobranchs ===
Opisthobranch gastropods are hermaphrodites, as are the pulmonates; however, opisthobranchs do not have love darts. Nonetheless, some of them do stab one another during mating, using hardened anatomical structures. For example, in the Cephalaspidean genus Siphopteron, both seaslugs attempt to stab their partner with a two-part, spined penis.
