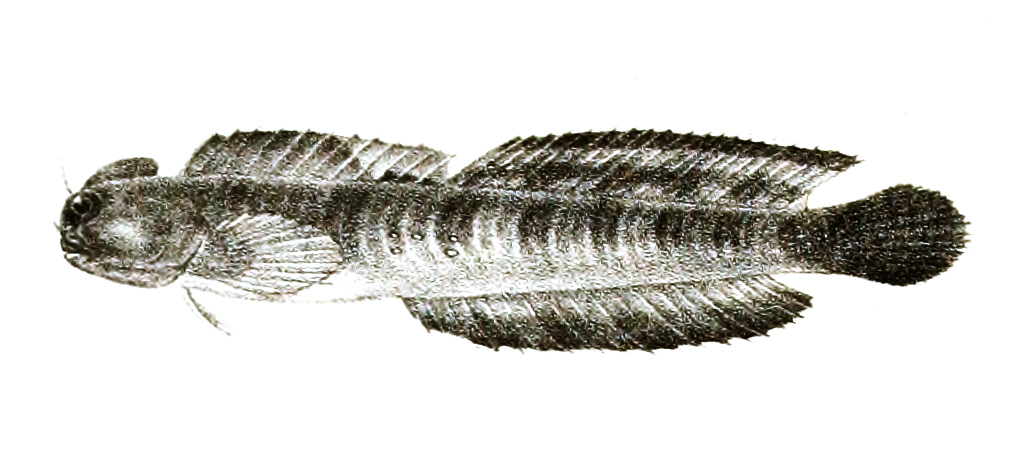

Conservation status
- Least Concern (IUCN 3.1)

Scientific classification
- Kingdom: Animalia
- Phylum: Chordata
- Class: Actinopterygii
- Order: Blenniiformes
- Family: Blenniidae
- Genus: Blenniella
- Species: B. bilitonensis

Binomial name
- Blenniella bilitonensis (Bleeker, 1858)

Synonyms
- Salarias bilitonensis Bleeker, 1858; Istiblennius bilitonensis (Bleeker, 1858); Salarias hendriksii Bleeker, 1858; Salarias deani Jordan & Seale, 1905; Alticus novemmaculosus Snyder, 1908; Salarias periophthalmus visayanus Herre, 1934; Salarias brevoorti Fowler, 1946

= Blenniella bilitonensis =

Species of fish

The biliton blenniella (Blenniella bilitonensis), also known as the biliton rockskipper, is a small saltwater fish species found in the intertidal zone throughout the southwestern Pacific Ocean. It is a member of the family Blenniidae, or the “combtooth blennies.” The species was first described in 1858 by Peter Bleeker, on Biliton Island in Indonesia from which the species gets its name.

== Species description ==
Adult biliton blenniella are small fish that grow to a maximum length of 16 cm, although most individuals are under 9 cm. Their coloration varies across its range, but most specimens are mottled shades of tan and olive-brown, often with darker brown barring down the sides. Combtooth blennies as a family are known for living in and around rocky tidepools, often spending periods of time completely out of the water and jumping around on rocks. Identification to species in this group is challenging and requires close inspection of a variety of physical and anatomical characteristics.

Biliton blenniella has many rays and spines running down the length of its dorsal side, ranging between 12 and 14 spines on the dorsal fin, and 19-22 soft rays on the dorsal fin. The anal fin is similar, with two spines and 18-22 soft rays. Biliton blenniella typically have 14 rays per pectoral fin, with a range of 13–15. The caudal fin has 10-14 procurrent rays and 11-13 segmented rays. Like many of the combtooth blennies, biliton blenniella have cirri, which are short, fleshy tabs extending off the head. The species has two to six nasal cirri but no cirri on the nape. It has a continuous lateral line, and a small occipital crest that is larger in males than females.

Males and female biliton blenniella can be differentiated by the shape pattern of olive brown barring the sides. Males have broad vertical bars with paler gaps between the bars, while females have bars in the shape of the letter “H,” including four to five bars on the caudal fin. While a great variety of color variation has been observed across the range of the biliton blenniella, shades of tan and brown are the most common.

Biliton blenniella can be differentiated from similar congeners (related species in the same genus) by the presence and absence of distinctive markings across the body. Spotting is rarely present on the pectoral fin of biliton blenniella but is present in a similar species Blenniella leopardus, also called the leopard blenniella. The species varies from zero to four thin stripes along the body, which are restricted to the anterior half of the fish, and do not extend beyond the base of the sixth segmented ray on the dorsal fin. Biliton blenniella typically have between six and seven faint bands down the sides, running posteriorly from the base of the first dorsal fin ray, and usually no band is present on the caudal peduncle, unlike some of its relatives. A small dark spot is present on all individuals just posterior to the orbit, usually in the mid-level of the body. Like many species of combtooth blenny, biliton blenniella have nuchal cirri, which are small appendages that attach to the head. These can be present or absent in the biliton blenniella.

== Taxonomy ==
The taxonomy of Blenniella has been studied on multiple occasions, with the systematics at the genus and species level reconsidered over time. According to the latest and most comprehensive research into the complex, the biliton blenniella is likely closely related to four other congeners, the blue-spotted blenny (Blenniella caudolineata), the striped rockskipper (Blenniella cyanostigma), the dashed-line blenny(Blenniella interrupta), and the leopard bleniella (Blenniella leopardus).

== Distribution ==
The biliton blenniella is found in temperate waters of the western Pacific Ocean, from the Ryukyu Islands off southern Japan to the McClure and New Year Islands in the Northern Territory of Australia. Within this north–south range the species can be found between 100 and 135 degrees east longitude. It is found near-shore in shallow waters and is often associated with tide-pools.

== Life History ==
Biliton blenniella are found in the intertidal zone and is often associated with tide-pools and coastal bays. It is known to feed on algae that it scrapes from rocks. The species is often found in large congregations, typically in tidal areas. Like other members of the amphibious family Blenniidae, the biliton blenniella may be seen outside of the water for brief periods, holding on to rock surfaces until waves wash it back into the water. When disturbed from small tidepools, members of the family Blenniidae will often jump out of the water and scurry across rocky surfaces in search of a bigger pool, retreating to deeper water for safety.

Biliton blenniella have a variety of adaptations that allow it to survive in the harsh conditions of the intertidal zone. To maintain structure and agility when jumping on rocks outside of the water, the species has evolved some reduced and fused bone structures compared to other intertidal fish species. Similarly, research has found a limited diversity of body shapes in intertidal members of Blenniidae, unlike their subtidal relatives. It is likely that the constant changing of tides, waves, and weather conditions in the intertidal zone constrains members of Blenniidae to a certain body plan that provides the best chance of survival in these harsh conditions.

Additional research has been done that compares microanatomical structures in the eyes of the biliton blenniella with that of another species that from in the subtidal zone, such as Bathygobious fuscus (commonly known as the Dusky frillgoby). Between the two species, the biliton blenniella has more corneal pigmentation which is important to help protect the retina from harsh lighting conditions found outside of the water. The researchers also determined the biliton blenniella to have a greater number of cone cells than the dusky frillgoby, which allows the species to create a better visual image on land. Additionally, biliton blenniella have a better-developed choroid gland that supplies the eyes with oxygen and nutrients required for vision on land.

Biliton blenniella are oviparous, which means they lay eggs and their eggs hatch outside the body of the animal. Their eggs have special adhesive that allow them to be attached to the substrate they are laid on. Once hatched, the larvae are planktonic, measuring less than 6.5mm long. The larvae are found in the same shallow waters as adults.

== Conservation Status ==
Little has been published regarding the conservation status of the biliton blenniella, nor have any broad estimates of abundance been published on the species. However, it is treated as a species of Least Concern according to the IUCN Red List of Threatened Species. This species was last investigated by the U.N. in 2009. It has not been evaluated by the CITES treaty at this time. Given the very small physical size of this species and other members Blenniidae, there is no concern about over-fishing in this species.
