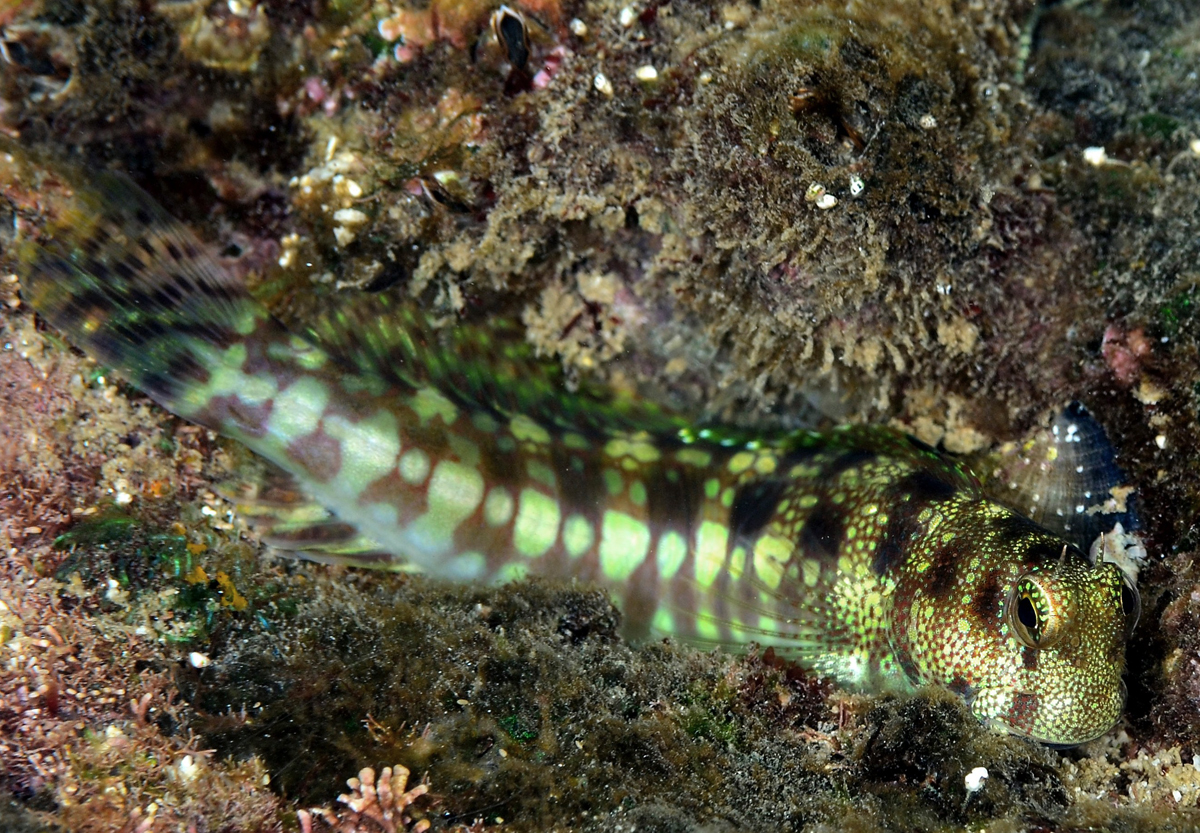
- Hump-headed blenny Blenniella gibbifrons

Scientific classification
- Domain: Eukaryota
- Kingdom: Animalia
- Phylum: Chordata
- Class: Actinopterygii
- Order: Blenniiformes
- Family: Blenniidae
- Genus: Blenniella; Reid, 1943

Type species
- Blenniella rhessodon Reid, 1943

= Blenniella =

Genus of fishes

Blenniella is a genus of combtooth blennies found in the Pacific and Indian Oceans.

== Species ==
There are currently nine recognized species in this genus:

- Blenniella bilitonensis (Bleeker, 1858) (Lined rockskipper)
- Blenniella caudolineata (Günther, 1877) (Blue-spotted blenny)
- Blenniella chrysospilos (Bleeker, 1857) (Red-spotted blenny)
- Blenniella cyanostigma (Bleeker, 1849) (Striped rockskipper)
- Blenniella gibbifrons (Quoy & Gaimard, 1824) (Hump-headed blenny)
- Blenniella interrupta (Bleeker, 1857) (Dashed-line blenny)
- Blenniella leopardus (Fowler, 1904)
- Blenniella paula (Bryan & Herre, 1903)
- Blenniella periophthalmus (Valenciennes, 1836) (Blue-dashed rockskipper)
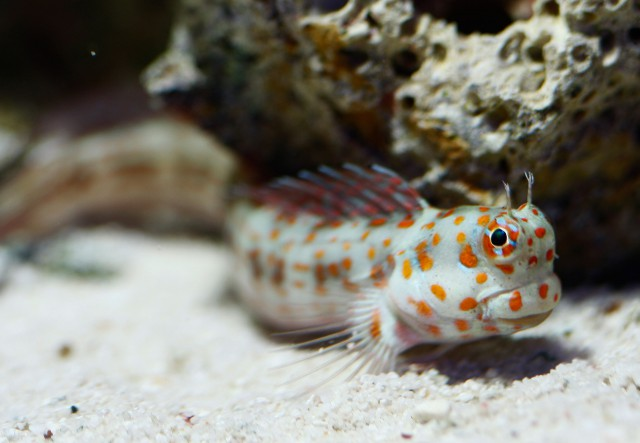
Blenniella chrysospilos

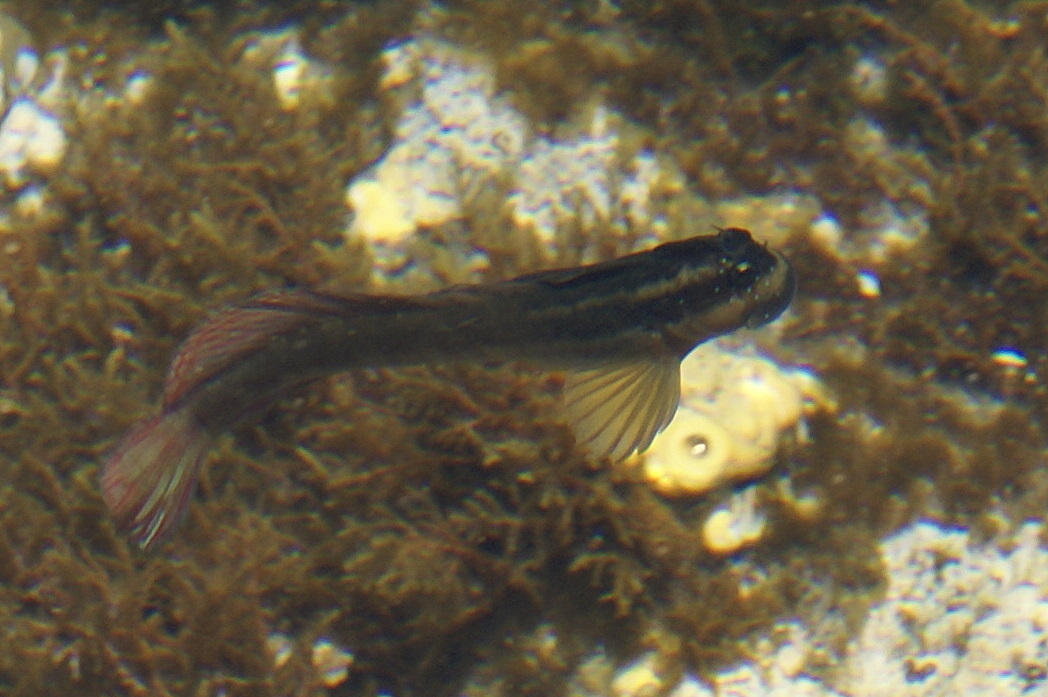
Blenniella cyanostigma

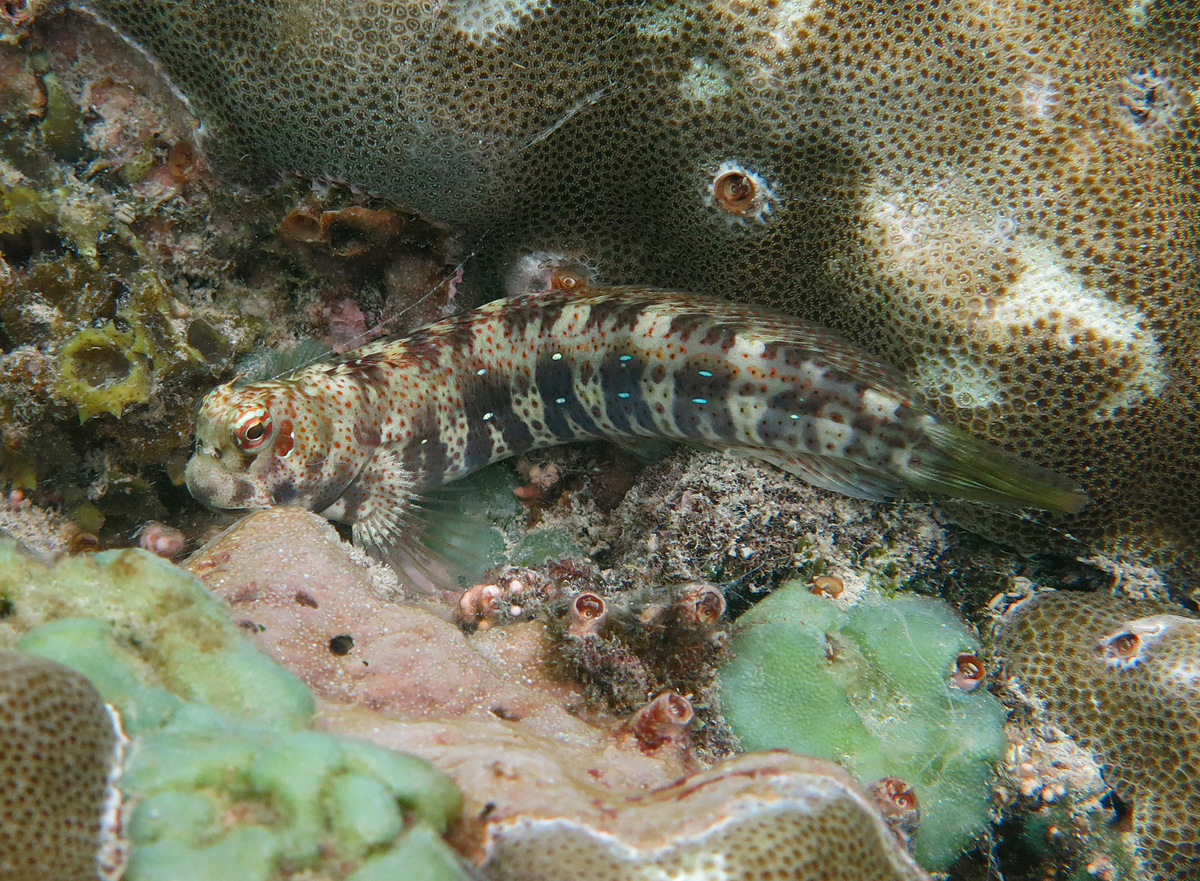
Blenniella periophthalmus
