= San Xavier talus snail =

Conservation status
- Near Threatened (IUCN 2.3)

- Critically Imperiled (NatureServe)

Scientific classification
- Kingdom: Animalia
- Phylum: Mollusca
- Class: Gastropoda
- Order: Stylommatophora
- Family: Xanthonychidae
- Subfamily: Helminthoglyptinae
- Genus: Sonorella
- Species: S. eremita

Binomial name
- Sonorella eremita Pilsbry & Ferriss, 1915

Species of gastropod

The San Xavier talus snail, scientific name Sonorella eremita, is a species of air-breathing land snail, a terrestrial pulmonate gastropod mollusc in the subfamily Helminthoglyptinae. This species is endemic to the United States. The common name "talus snail" refers to the fact that snails in this genus live on and in talus.
