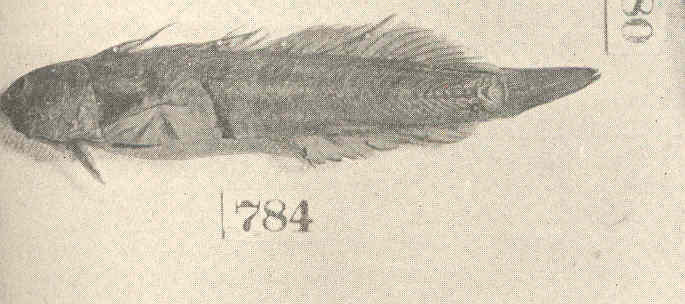

Conservation status
- Least Concern (IUCN 3.1)

Scientific classification
- Kingdom: Animalia
- Phylum: Chordata
- Class: Actinopterygii
- Order: Blenniiformes
- Family: Blenniidae
- Genus: Blenniella
- Species: B. paula

Binomial name
- Blenniella paula (Bryan & Herre, 1903)

Synonyms
- Salarias paulus Bryan & Herre, 1903; Istiblennius paulus (Bryan & Herre, 1903); Salarias tubuensis Seale, 1906

= Blenniella paula =

Species of fish

Blenniella paula, the blue-dashed rockskipper, is a species of combtooth blenny found in coral reefs in the western Pacific ocean.
