= A. altissima =

A. altissima may refer to:

- Acrogenospora altissima, a species of fungus in the class Dothideomycetes
- Ageratina altissima, a species of flowering plant
- Ailanthus altissima, a species of flowering plant
- Amara altissima, a species of ground beetle in the genus Amara
- Aningeria altissima, a species of flowering plant
- Anthraconaia altissima, a species of bivalve in the subclass Pteriomorphia
- Ashmunella altissima, a species of snail in the genus Ashmunella
- Aspalathus altissima, a species of flowering plant in the genus Aspalathus
