= Elizabeth Bryan =

Elizabeth Bryan may refer to:

- Elizabeth Bryan (executive), Australian executive
- Elizabeth Carew (née Bryan) (c. 1500–1546), English courtier and reputed mistress of King Henry VIII
- Elizabeth M. Bryan (1942–2008), English paediatrician
- Elizabeth Jane Letson Bryan (1874–1919), American malacologist and museum director

== See also ==
- Betsy Bryan (born 1949), American Egyptologist
