= Arthur H. Harris =

American mammalogist and paleontologist

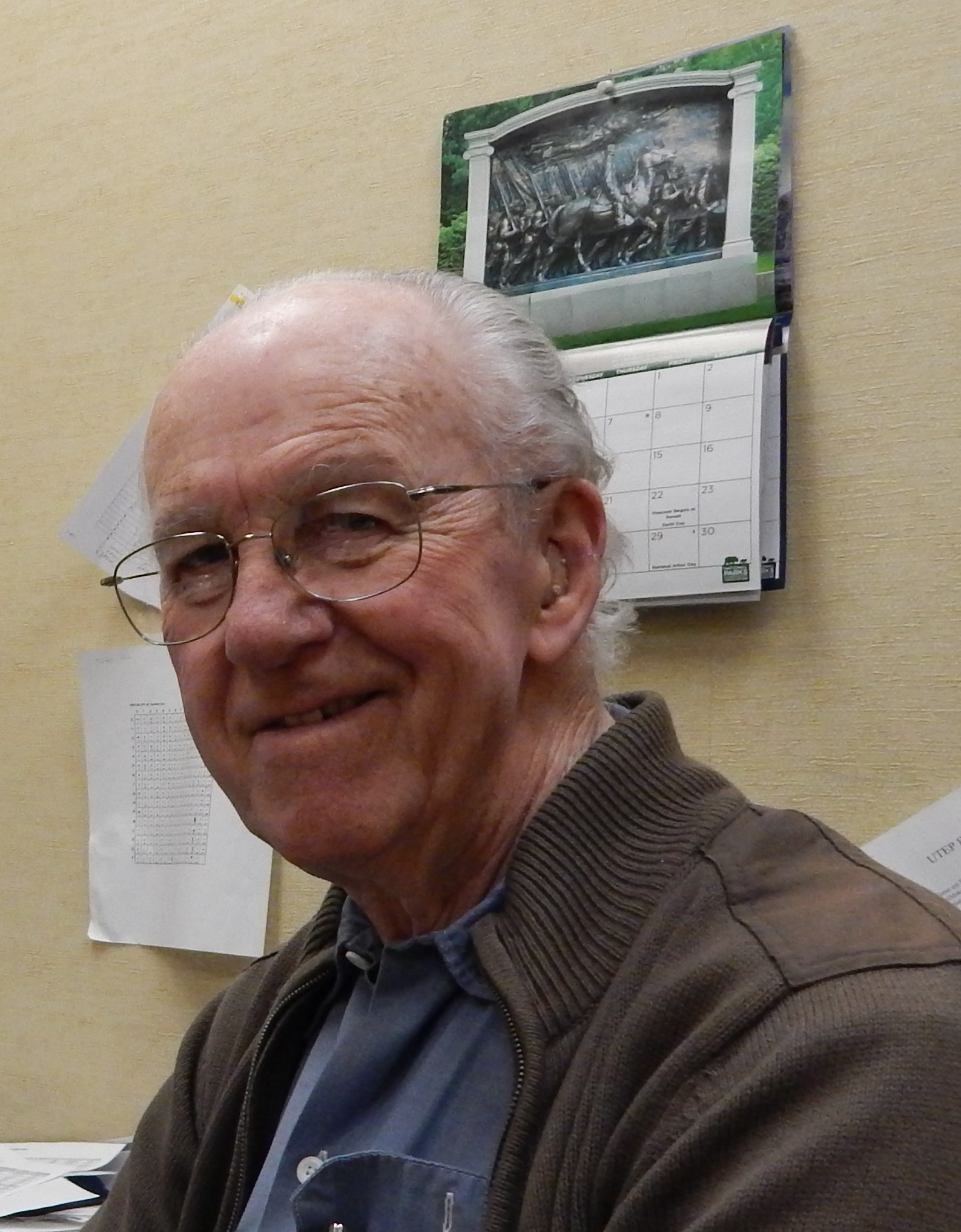
- Harris in his office at the University of Texas at El Paso
- Born: May 18, 1931; Middleboro, Massachusetts
- Died: September 8, 2025; El Paso, Texas
- Education: University of New Mexico
- Awards: see article section
- Scientific career
- Fields: Mammalogy and Paleontology
- Workplaces: Fort Hays State University, University of Texas at El Paso
- Doctoral advisor: James S. Findley
- Author abbrev. (zoology): A. H. Harris

Arthur H. Harris is an American mammalogist and paleontologist.

== Education ==
Arthur H. Harris spent his academic career at the University of New Mexico where he earned a Bachelor's degree in biology with a minor in anthropology (1958), a Master of Science in zoology with a minor in botany (1959) and a PhD in vertebrate zoology with a minor in geochronology in 1965.

== Professional career ==
Harris began his career as an assistant professor of zoology at Ft. Hays Kansas State College. From there he relocated to The University of Texas at El Paso where he held the positions of assistant professor of Biological Sciences, Associate Professor of Biological Sciences, and Professor of Biological Sciences. After his retirement from teaching, Harris was honored as Professor Emeritus, Biological Sciences.

Harris is Past Director of the Laboratory for Environmental Biology (now the UTEP Biodiversity Collections), Curator of Higher Vertebrates, and Curator of Vertebrate Paleobiology. He is a Research Associate in the Museum of Southwestern Biology Division of Mammals.

== Research ==
Harris's research is focused primarily on Pleistocene vertebrate faunal remains from the southwestern United States and northwestern Mexico.

=== Pendejo Cave ===
Harris completed a preliminary report on the fauna of the Pendejo Cave in 1991. Subsequently, he prepared a review of the vertebrate fauna of the cave and contributed this research for a section of Pendejo Cave. Subsequently, both Harris and others have reworked the faunal list for the cave extensively to better reflect the time units and modifications of identifications since Pendejo Cave was published.

== Awards ==
- NSF Graduate Fellowship (1959-1960)
- NSF Graduate Fellowship (1961-1962)

== Taxa ==
=== Taxa named for Arthur H. Harris ===
- Notiosorex harrisi Carraway 2010 (Soricomorpha, Soricidae)
- Ashmunella harrisi Metcalf & Smartt 1977

=== Taxa described by Arthur H. Harris ===
- Aztlanolagus agilis Russell & Harris 1986 (Lagomorpha, Leporidae)
- Neotoma findleyi Harris 1984
- Neotoma pygmaea Harris 1984
- Corvus neomexicanus Magish and Harris 1976

== Selected publications ==
Arthur H. Harris Field Journal 1965

- Russell, Brett D., and Arthur H. Harris. 1986. A New Leporine (Lagomorpha: Leporidae) from Wisconsinan Deposits of the Chihuahuan Desert.. In: Journal of Mammalogy 67(4):632-639, doi:10.2307/1381125.
- Harris, Arthur H., and Linda S. W. Porter. 1980. Late Pleistocene Horses of Dry Cave, Eddy County, New Mexico.. In: Journal of Mammalogy 61(1):46-65.t, doi:10.2307/1379956.
- Findley, James S., Arthur H. Harris, Don E. Wilson, and Clyde Jones. 1975. Mammals of New Mexico. University of New Mexico Press. 360 pp.
- Harris, A.H. 2014. Pleistocene vertebrates of southwestern USA and northwestern Mexico // UTEP Biodiversity Collections, University of Texas at El Paso; NMSW-Paleo, doi:10.13140/2.1.3490.7527

Harris has published extensively. See external links for more comprehensive sources.

== Service ==
Harris communicated his research to the public through writing episodes of Desert Diaries, a series of radio shorts presented by the Centennial Museum and National Public Radio for the Southwest (KTEP) from 2001 to 2005.

He served as Managing Editor of The Southwestern Naturalist a publication of the Southwestern Association of Naturalists from 1978 to 1982.
