= Notiosorex harrisi =

Harris' shrew Temporal range: Holocene-aged ≤79 ka

Scientific classification
- Domain: Eukaryota
- Kingdom: Animalia
- Phylum: Chordata
- Class: Mammalia
- Order: Eulipotyphla
- Family: Soricidae
- Genus: Notiosorex
- Species: †N. harrisi

Binomial name
- †Notiosorex harrisi Carroway, 2010

Extinct species of shrew

Notiosorex harrisi is an extinct species of shrew from the subfamily Soricinae.

It is one of several extinct species of Notiosorex described from the fossil record and the specific epithet is a patronymic to honor Arthur H. Harris for his decades of work on the paleontology of mammals in the southwestern United States.

== Holotype ==
The holotype specimen is deposited at the University of Texas at El Paso Biodiversity Collections as UTEP:ES:120-2526. It is an adult, left dentary with the first incisor, fourth premolar and first through third molars. The specimen was collected from Big Manhole Cave in Eddy County, New Mexico.
