= Ashmunella harrisi =

Conservation status
- Critically Imperiled (NatureServe)

Scientific classification
- Kingdom: Animalia
- Phylum: Mollusca
- Class: Gastropoda
- Order: Stylommatophora
- Family: Polygyridae
- Genus: Ashmunella
- Species: A. harrisi

Binomial name
- Ashmunella harrisi Metcalf & Smartt 1977

Species of gastropod

Ashmunella harrisi is a species of air-breathing land snail, a terrestrial pulmonate gastropod mollusc in the family Polygyridae.

== Type specimens ==
=== Holotype ===
The holotype was collected on April 11, 1975 from limestone talus on the north-facing wall of a canyon indenting the East side of Goat Mountain. It is deposited at the Academy of Natural Sciences of Drexel University ANSP 340724.

=== Paratypes ===
Paratypes are deposited at

- Academy of Natural Sciences of Drexel University ANSP 340725
- DelMNH 106682
- DMNH 4535
- National Museum of Natural History USNM 758527
- University of Texas at El Paso Biodiversity Collections UTEP:ES:3139 and UTEP:ES:4413

== Distribution ==
Known from two canyons on the east side of Goat Mountain in the southeastern part of the San Andres Mountains.

== Etymology ==
The species is named in honor of Dr. Arthur H. Harris, who first collected the species.
