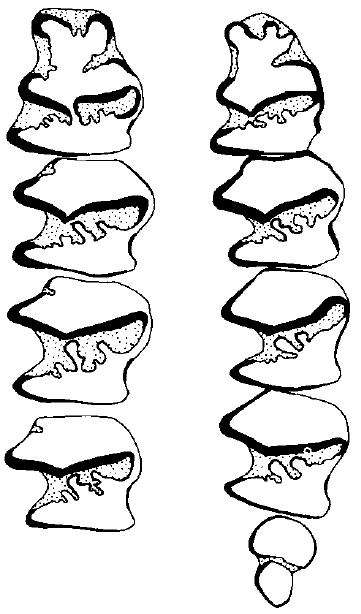

Scientific classification
- Kingdom: Animalia
- Phylum: Chordata
- Class: Mammalia
- Infraclass: Placentalia
- Order: Lagomorpha
- Family: Leporidae
- Genus: †Aztlanolagus; Russell & Harris, 1986
- Species: †A. agilis

Binomial name
- †Aztlanolagus agilis Russell & Harris, 1986

= Aztlanolagus =

Aztlanolagus Temporal range: Pliocene-Pleistocene

Extinct genus of rabbits

Aztlanolagus is an extinct monotypic genus of rabbit that lived during the Quaternary in what is now the Southern to Southwestern United States and northern Mexico. Aztlanolagus agilis is currently the only recognized species, though differences among recovered fossils suggest that there may have been other species.

== Name ==
The generic name refers to Aztlán, the legendary place of origin of the Nahua peoples as recorded in the mythological accounts of the Aztecs and other Nahua groups. By some traditions, this legendary locale is placed in the border regions of the Southwestern United States and adjacent northern Mexico.

== Age and identification ==
Fossils range in age from the Pliocene and Pleistocene (Blancan to Rancholabrean North American land mammal ages). The known distribution is from southeastern Arizona (Madrean Sky Islands region), to central Texas and from central Colorado to southern Chihuahua.

Aztlanolagus may be distinguished from all other known leporids as follows. Lower incisor terminates under diastema and well anterior to P_{3}. Three reentrant folds present on trigonid of P_{3}: an anterior reentrant fold, an anterointernal reentrant fold (rarely cut off to form an enamel lake), and an anteroexternal fold. At all growth stages, a posteroexternal reentrant fold extends approximately halfway across occlusal surface of P_{3} to a narrow enamel lake lying next to lingual border; enamel lake rarely joined to external reentrant to form the Lepus-type pattern (Hibbard, 1963). On P_{4} to M_{2}, external fold extends to enamel of lingual wall. Anterior border of talonid on P_{4}-M_{2} deeply convoluted, often with alternating series of major and minor enamel loops.... (Russell and Harris 1986:632-633)

The holotype of Aztlanolagus agilis was deposited at the University of Texas at El Paso Biodiversity Collections. (Specimen No. UTEP:ES:1-1202). The specimen, collected by Richard A. Smartt, is a left dentary with premolars 3 and 4 and molars 1 and 2.

The youngest records of the genus date to around 30,000 years ago. Aztlantolagus has been recognised as most closely related to the extinct genus Pliopentalagus (from which it probably descended) and the living Japanese Amami rabbit (Pentalagus), with a 2024 study suggesting that Aztlantolagus should be synonymised with Pliopentalagus.
