= Franklin Mountain talus snail =

Conservation status
- Near Threatened (IUCN 2.3)

- Imperiled (NatureServe)

Scientific classification
- Kingdom: Animalia
- Phylum: Mollusca
- Class: Gastropoda
- Order: Stylommatophora
- Family: Xanthonychidae
- Subfamily: Helminthoglyptinae
- Genus: Sonorella
- Species: S. metcalfi

Binomial name
- Sonorella metcalfi W.B. Miller, 1976

Species of gastropod

The Franklin Mountain talus snail, scientific name Sonorella metcalfi, is a species of air-breathing land snail, a terrestrial pulmonate gastropod mollusk in the subfamily Helminthoglyptinae. This species is endemic to the United States.

The name "talus snail" refers to the fact that snails in this genus live on and in talus. This species is named after the Franklin Mountains in Texas.

The specific name metcalfi honors the American malacologist Artie L. Metcalf.
