= Sonorella macrophallus =

Conservation status
- Near Threatened (IUCN 2.3)

- Critically Imperiled (NatureServe)

Scientific classification
- Kingdom: Animalia
- Phylum: Mollusca
- Class: Gastropoda
- Order: Stylommatophora
- Family: Xanthonychidae
- Subfamily: Helminthoglyptinae
- Genus: Sonorella
- Species: S. macrophallus

Binomial name
- Sonorella macrophallus Fairbanks & Reeder, 1980

Species of gastropod

Sonorella macrophallus is a species of air-breathing land snail, a terrestrial pulmonate gastropod mollusk in the subfamily Helminthoglyptinae. This species is endemic to the United States.
