= Artie L. Metcalf =

Artie Lou Metcalf
- 1963 UTEP Faculty Headshot
- Born: July 5, 1929; Dexter, Kansas, U.S.
- Died: January 31, 2016 (aged 86); Arkansas City, Kansas, U.S.
- Education: University of Kansas
- Scientific career
- Fields: Biology, Malacology
- Workplaces: University of Texas at El Paso
- Author abbrev. (zoology): A. L. Metcalf

Artie Lou Metcalf (July 5, 1929 – January 31, 2016) was an American malacologist.

== Family ==
Metcalf was born in Dexter, Kansas, the son of Art and Lucile Metcalf.

== Education ==
Metcalf completed his undergraduate work in 1956 at Kansas State University where he earned a Bachelor of Science in Education/Zoology. He went on to earn a Master of Arts in Zoology in 1957 also from Kansas State. In 1964 Metcalf earned a Ph.D. in Zoology from the University of Kansas. Metcalf continued his education, earning a Master of Arts in Spanish in 1990 at the University of Texas at El Paso. In keeping with his biology background, his thesis is titled "Observaciones sobre nombres de aves mexicanas".

== Career ==
Metcalf began his career in 1949 teaching elementary school at Glenwood, a rural school near Dexter, Kansas. In 1962 he became an Instructor in the Department of Biological Science at the University of Texas at El Paso where he ended his career as Professor Emeritus and Curator of Biodiversity Collections.

== Taxa ==
=== Taxa named for Artie L. Metcalf ===
- Sonorella metcalfi Miller, 1976
- Holospira metcalfi Thompson, 1974
- Oreohelix metcalfei species complex Pilsbry and Ferris, 1917

=== Taxa described by Artie L. Metcalf ===
- Ashmunella rileyensis Metcalf & Hurley, 1971
- Etheostoma pallididorsum Distler & Metcalf, 1962
- Ashmunella harrisi Metcalf & Smartt 1977
- Ashmunella todseni Metcalf & Smartt 1977

== Publications ==
=== Other publications ===
- 1959. Fishes of Chautauqua, Cowley and Elk counties, Kansas. University of Kansas Publications, Museum of Natural History 1959:1:345-400
- 1961. New distributional records for two species of crayfish. Transactions of the Kansas Academy of Science 64:4:353-356 with Distler, D. A.
- 1961. Fishes of the Wakarusa River in Kansas. University of Kansas Publications, Museum of Natural History 1961:13:309-322 with Deacon, J. E.
- 1962. Etheostoma pallididorsum, a new percid fish from the Caddo River System of Arkansas. Copeia 1962:3:556-561 with Distler, D. A.
- 1962. Gastropods of Cowley County, Kansas. Transactions of the Kansas Academy of Science 65:275-289
- 1963. The crayfish Oronectes palmeri longimanus (Faxon) in Kansas. Transactions of the Kansas Academy of Science 66:1:141-147 with Distler, D. A.
- 1963. Records of three lampreys (Ichthyomyzon) from the Missouri River System. Copeia 1963:187 with Cross, F. B.
- 1966. Fishes of the Kansas River System in relation to zoogeography of the Great Plains. University of Kansas Publications, Museum of Natural History pp. 23–189, 4 figs.
- 1966. Corbicula manilensis in the Mesilla Valley of Texas and New Mexico. Nautilus 80:16-20
- 1967. Late Quaternary mollusks of the Rio Grande Valley, Caballo Dam, New Mexico, to El Paso, Texas. University of Texas at El Paso Science Serial 1:1-62
- 1968. Mollusca of El Paso County, westernmost Texas. Annual Report of the American Malacol. Union 34:32-33
- 1969. Quaternary surfaces, sediments, and mollusks: southern Mesilla Valley, New Mexico and Texas. New Mexico Geological Society Field Conference Guidebook 20:158-164
- 1970. Field Journal of Henry A. Pilsbury pertaining to New Mexico and Trans-Pecos Texas. Sterkiana 39:23-37
- 1970. Late Pleistocene (Woodfordian) gastropods from Dry Cave, Eddy County, New Mexico. Texas Journal of Science 22:41-46
- 1970. Observations on Ornate Box Turtles (Terrapene ornata ornata Agassiz). Transactions of the Kansas Academy of Science 73:96-117 with Metcalf, E. L.
- 1971. Gastropods of the Franklin Mountains, El Paso County, Texas. The Southwestern Naturalist. Vol.16 No.1 pp. 85–109 with Walter.E. Johnson
- 1971. A new Ashmunella (Polygyridae) from Doña Ana County, New Mexico. The Nautilus 84:120-127 with Hurley, P. A.
- 1972. Field journals of Henry A. Pilsbury pertaining to Arizona. Sterkiana 45:21-31 with Bequaert, J. C. & Miller, W. B.
- 1972. Records of introduced mollusks: New Mexico and western Texas. The Nautilus 85:144-145 with Smartt, R. A.
- 1973. New fossil Ashmunellas from New Mexico (Gastropoda: Pulmonata: Polygyridae). The Veliger 16:31-39
- 1974. Gastropods of Howells Ridge, Grant County, New Mexico: A fauna in the process of extinction? Southwestern Naturalist 19:1:57-64
- 1974. Chromosome numbers in Ashmunella (Gastropoda: Pulmonata: Polygyridae). The Veliger 17:19-21 with Stern, E. M.
- 1974. Peripheral species of the Oreohelix metcalfei Cockerell complex (Pulmonata: Oreohelicidae). The Nautilus 88:94-100
- 1976. A new Humboldtiana (Pulmonata: Helminthoglyptidae) from Coahuila, Mexico. The Nautilus 90(3):99-100
- 1976. First records of two species of land snails in New Mexico. Southwestern Naturalist 21:410-411
- 1976. A new fossil Asmunella (Pulmonata: Polygyridae) from the Guadalupe Mountains National Park, Texas. The Nautilus 92:88-91 with Fullington, R. W.
- 1977. Two new species of Ashmunella from Dona Aña County, New Mexico, with notes on the Ashmunella kochii complex. Proceedings of the Biological Society of Washington 90(4):849-876 with Smartt, R. A.
- 1978. A new fossil Ashmunella (Pulmonata: Polygyridae) from the Sierra Diablo and Hueco mountains, Texas. The Nautilus 92:88-91 with Fullington, R. W.
- 1978. An experiment with homing in Ornate Box Turtles (Terrapene ornata ornata Agassiz). Journal of Herpetology 12:411-412 with Metcalf, E. L.
- 1978. Some Quaternary molluscan faunas from the northern Chihuahuan Desert and their paleoecological implications. Trans. Symp. Biol. Resources Chihuahuan Desert Region, National Park Service Transactions and Proceedings Series 3:53-66
- 1979. Four new species of Polygyra (Gastropoda: Pulmonata: Polygyridae). Proceedings of the Biological Society of Washington 91:815-827 with Riskind, D. H.
- 1979. Mortality in hibernating Ornate Box Turtles, Terrapene ornata. Herpetologica 35:93-96 with Metcalf, E. L.
- 1979. New information concerning Humboldtiana taylori Drake, 1951 (Gastropoda: Pulmonata: Helminthoglyptidae). The Veliger 22:179-181 with Riskind, D. H.
- 1980. A new fossil Radiocentrum (Pulmonata: Oreohelicidae) from northern Coahuila, Mexico. The Nautilus 94(1):16-17
- 1980. Fossil Rangia cuneata (Matridae) in Eddy County, New Mexico. The Nautilus 94(1):2-3
- 1980. Unionacean mussels, past and present, from six streams in Kansas and Oklahoma. Transactions Kansas Academy Science 83:1-19
- 1982. A new species (with subspecies) of fossil Oreohelix from New Mexico. The Veliger 24(3):259-264
- 1982. A new species of fossil Oreohelix (Pulmonata: Oreohelicidae) from Otero County, New Mexico. The Veliger 24(3):265-266 with Crews, C. R.
- 1982. A new species of oreohelicid land snail from the San Agustin Plains, New Mexico. Proceedings of the Biological Society of Washington 95:256-264 with Crews, C. R.
- 1982. Fossil unionacean bivalves from three tributaries of the Rio Grande. pp. 43–59 in Davis, J.R. (Ed.) Proceedings of the symposium on recent benthological investigations in Texas and adjacent states. Texas Academy of Science, Austin, Texas, pp. 1–278
- 1982. A new Humboldtiana (Pulmonata: Helminthoglyptidae) from northwestern Coahuila, Mexico. The Nautilus 97(2):69-72
- 1982. Additions to New Mexico's land molluscan fauna with notes on Ashmunella. New Mexico Journal of Science 22(2):43-45 with Wahl, C. R.
- 1983. Mortality in unionacean mussels in a year of drought. Transactions Kansas Academy of Science 86:89-92
- 1984. Land snails (Gastropoda: Pulmonata) from Cimarron County, Oklahoma. Texas Journal of Science 36:53-64
- 1984. Distributions of land snails of the San Andreas and Organ Mountains, southern New Mexico. The Southwestern Naturalist. 29:35-44
- 1984. Gastropods collected from eastern Oklahoma by Dwight Isely in 1911. The Nautilus 98:135-137 with Distler, D. A.
- 1984. A new Humboldtiana (Pulmonata: Helminthoglyptidae) from extreme eastern Chihuahua, Mexico. The Nautilus 98:145-147
- 1985. Longevity in some Ornate Box Turtles (Terrapene ornata ornata). Journal of Herpetology 19:157-158 with Metcalf, E. L.
- 1985. Some land snails of the Sierra San Ignacio, Chihuahua, Mexico, in relation to regional distribution. The Southwestern Naturalist 30:459-460 with Carrillo, A.
- 1986. Fossil molluscan faunas from four spring-related deposits in the northern Chihuahuan Desert, southern New Mexico and westernmost Texas. New Mexico Bureau Mines and Natural Resources Circular 200:5-23 with Ashbaugh, K. M.
- 1988. Freshwater bivalves of the lower Rio Grande, Texas. Texas Journal of Science, 40(3):259-268 with Neck, R.
- 1997. (Book Review). Howells, R.G., et al.: Freshwater mussels of Texas. Texas Journal of Science 49:173-174
- 1997. Additions to the present and Quaternary gastropod faunas of the Franklin Mountains, El Paso County, Texas. Southwestern Naturalist 42:471-477 with Worthington, R. D.
- 1997. Altitudinal distribution of land snails in some montane canyons in New Mexico. New Mexico Museum of Natural History and Science, Bulletin 10:109-127 with Dillon, T. J.
- 1997. Land snails of New Mexico. New Mexico Museum of Natural History and Science Bulletin 10:1-145 with Smartt, R. A. (eds)
- 1997. Land snails of New Mexico: A systematic review. New Mexico Museum of Natural History and Science, Bulletin 10:1-69 with Smartt, R. A.
- 1997. Land snails of New Mexico from a historical zoogeographic point of view. New Mexico Museum of Natural History and Science Bulletin 10:71-108.
- 2002. Designation of a lectotype for Succinea grosvenorii Lea (Mollusca: Gastropoda: Pulmonata). The Veliger 45:79-81.
