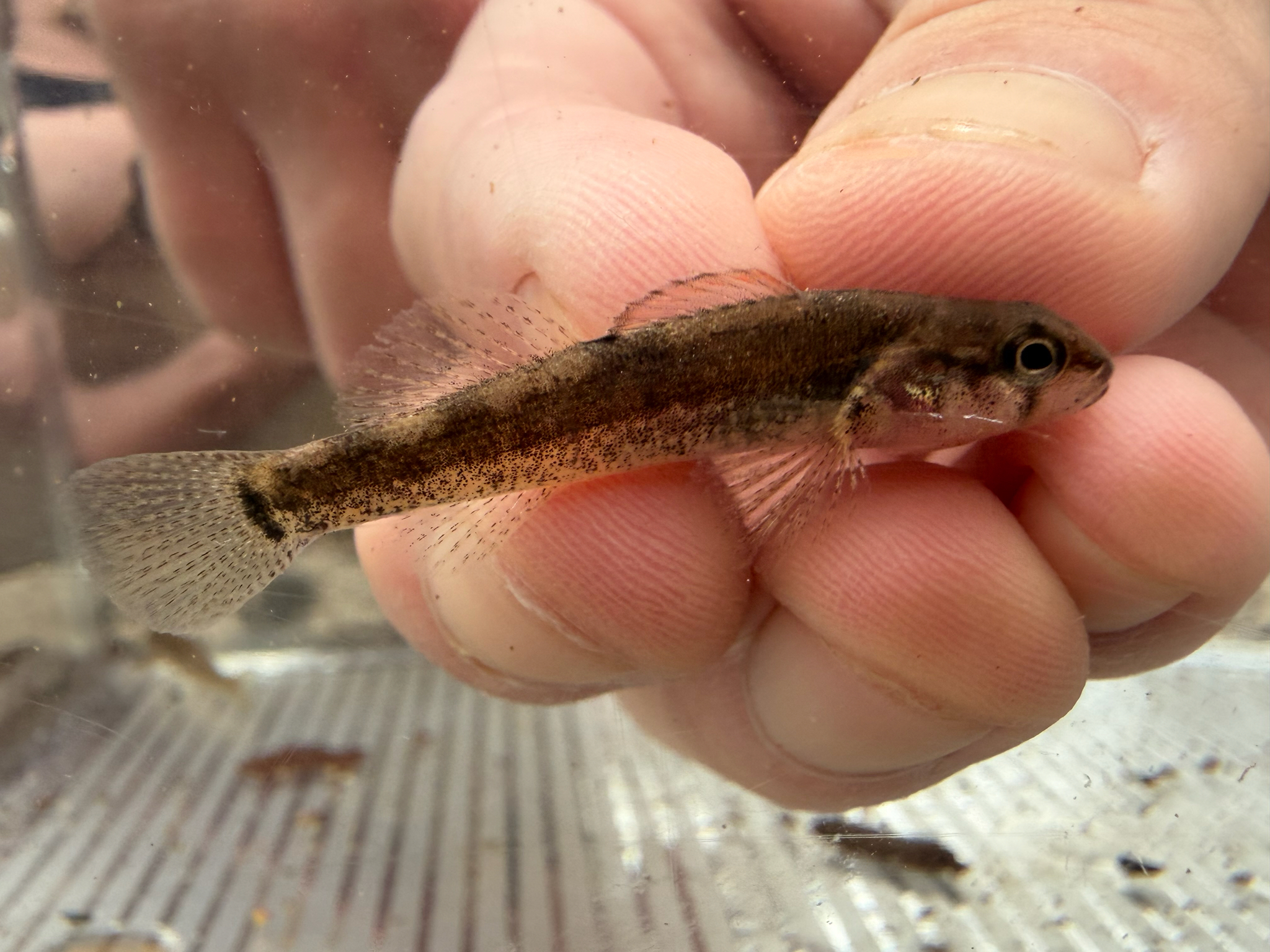

Conservation status
- Vulnerable (IUCN 3.1)

- Imperiled (NatureServe)

Scientific classification
- Kingdom: Animalia
- Phylum: Chordata
- Class: Actinopterygii
- Order: Perciformes
- Family: Percidae
- Genus: Etheostoma
- Species: E. pallididorsum

Binomial name
- Etheostoma pallididorsum Distler & Metcalf, 1962

= Paleback darter =

Species of fish

Etheostoma pallididorsum, the paleback darter, is a species of freshwater ray-finned fish, a darter from the subfamily Etheostomatinae, part of the family Percidae, which also contains the perches, ruffes and pikeperches. It is endemic to Arkansas in the United States. It is only known to occur in the Caddo River and in Hallmans Creek, a tributary of the Ouachita River. This species inhabits headwaters and creeks where it lives in rocky, shallow pools and also in springs with plentiful vegetation growth. This species can reach a length of 6 centimetres (2.4 in) TL though most only reach about 3.9 centimetres (1.5 in).

== See also ==
- Arkansas saddled darter: darter endemic to the White River in Arkansas and Missouri
- Percina brucethompsoni: darter endemic to the Ouachita River in Arkansas
