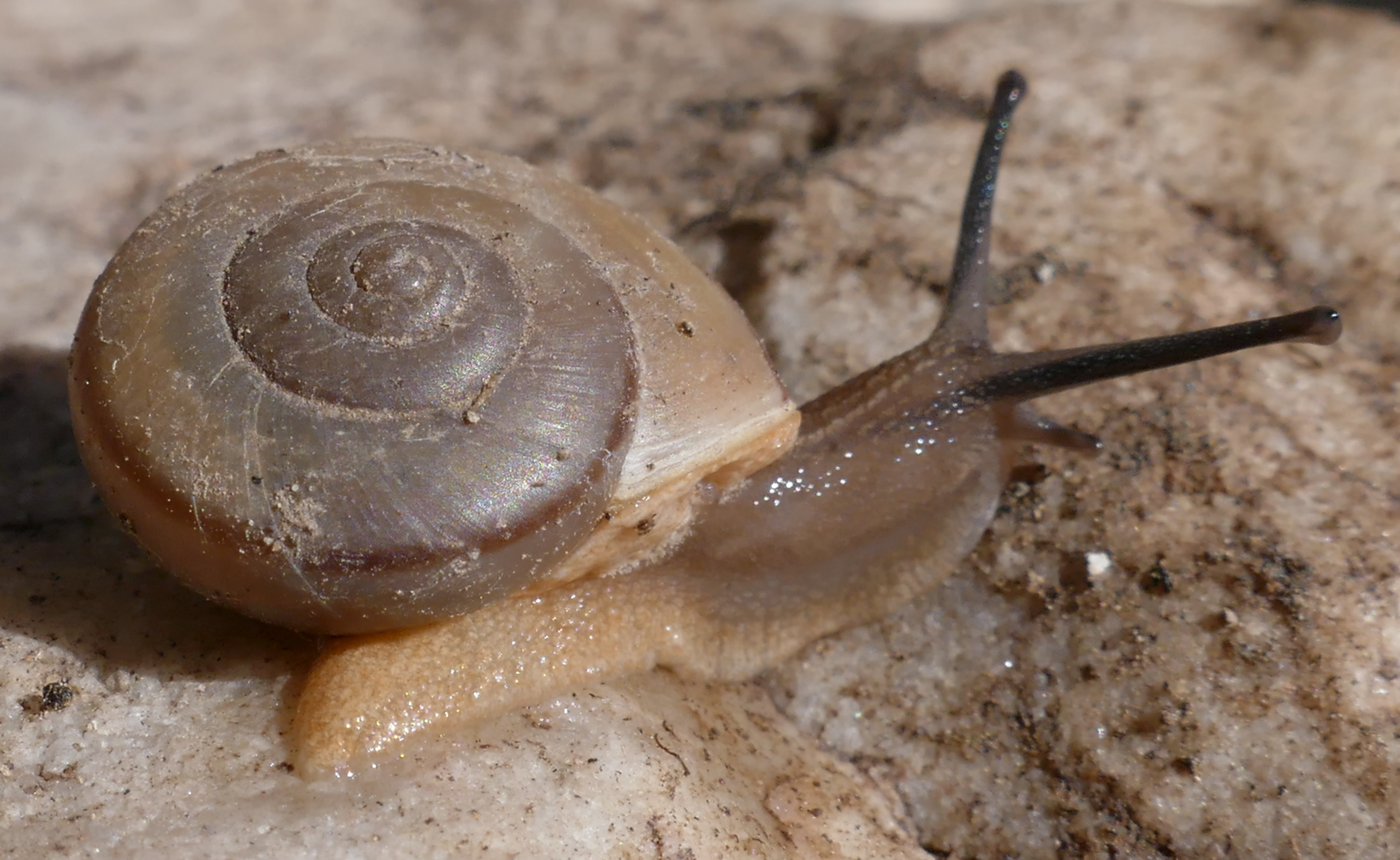

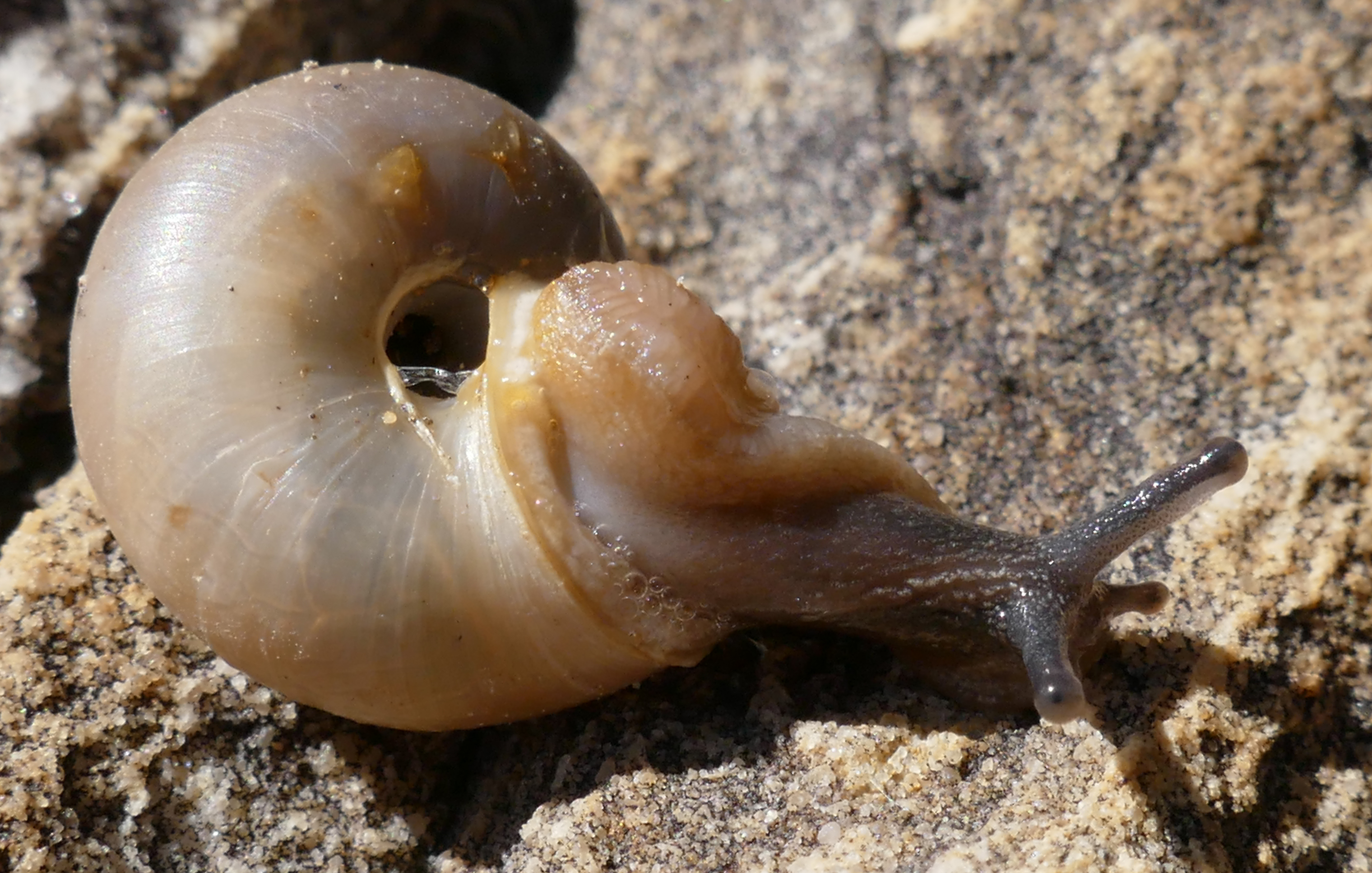
- Adults at type locality

Conservation status
- Critically Imperiled (NatureServe)

Scientific classification
- Kingdom: Animalia
- Phylum: Mollusca
- Class: Gastropoda
- Order: Stylommatophora
- Family: Xanthonychidae
- Genus: Sonorella
- Species: S. neglecta

Binomial name
- Sonorella neglecta Gregg, 1951

= Sonorella neglecta =

Species of mollusc

Sonorella neglecta is a terrestrial pulmonate gastropod mollusc in the subfamily Helminthoglyptinae. Sonorella is a genus of large land snails consisting of over 80 species, with new ones continuing to be described. The shells typically differ only rather subtly, but proportions of the genitalia differentiate species. The genus is distributed in the southwestern USA (Arizona, New Mexico and NW Texas) and northern Mexico, with individual species often restricted to a single mountain massif ("sky island") or to a small part of one. Sonorella neglecta is such a narrow-range endemic from the Chiricahua Mountains. Its official vernacular name is the portal talussnail.

== Discovery and description ==
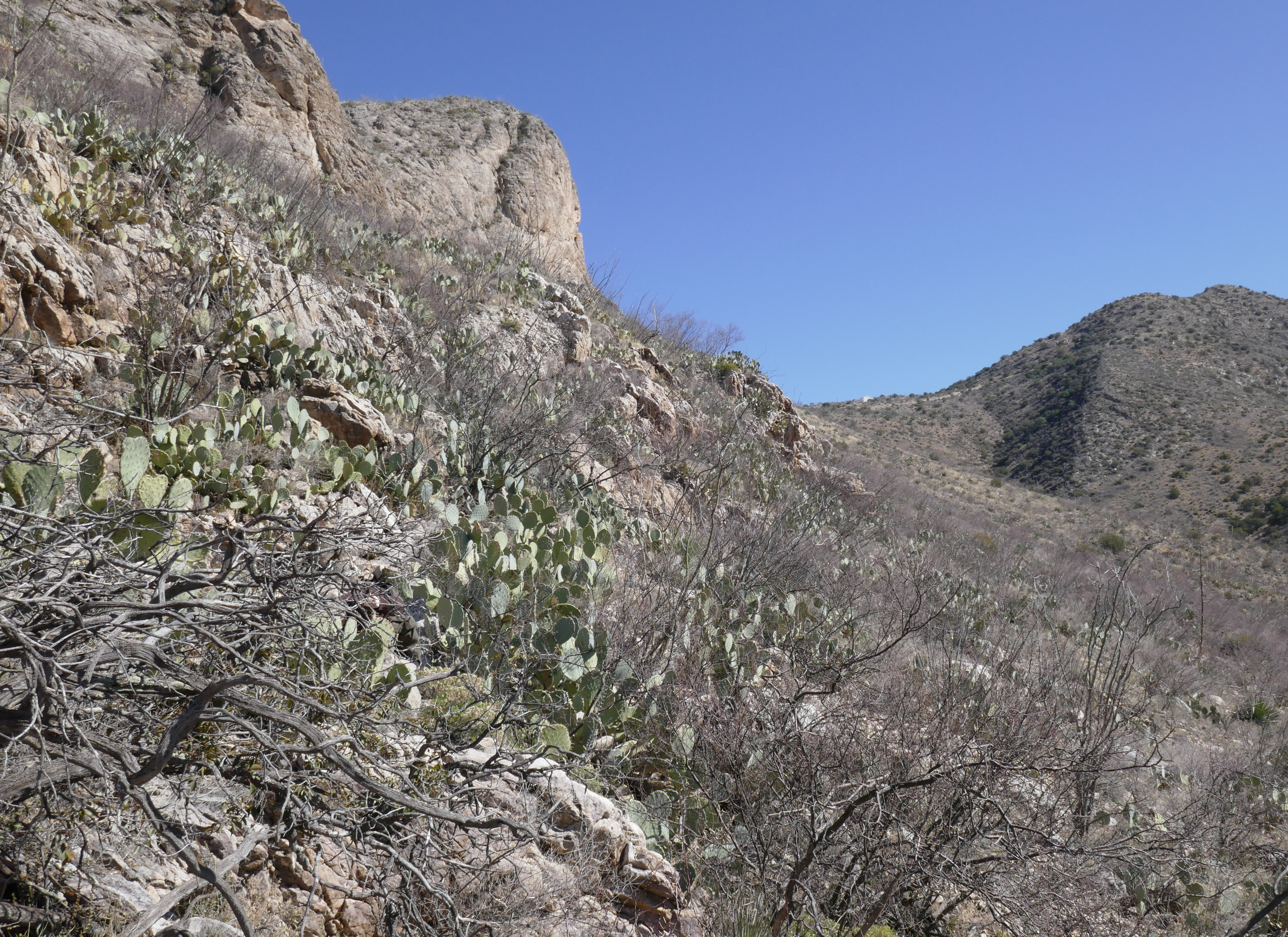
Type locality, February 2020

Paratype, diameter = 15.7 mm

Sonorella neglecta was described by Wendell Gregg in 1951 following its discovery in 1948 by Gregg and M.L. Walton on a rocky, south-facing hillside in the Chiricahua Mountains in south-eastern Arizona. The location is 3 miles west along the road from Portal to the town of Paradise (31.94°N 109.18°W), at an altitude of about 1750 m (5300 ft). They also found it at two or three other localities within a few miles of this type locality. At least six other Sonorella species occur in the same massif, of which S. virilis is known from particularly close by.

Like other species of the genus, the shell of S. neglecta is a little flatter than spherical, pale brown in colour with a chestnut peripheral band. Distinctive features of the shell are its relatively small size (15–17 mm diameter, c. 9 mm high), an umbilicus about a seventh of the diameter, and the surface sculpture of the protoconch. The type specimen is now in the Natural History Museum of Los Angeles County (LACM 1451).

Walter Miller later visited the type locality and found the first living specimens, describing their genital anatomy in his doctoral thesis.

== Phylogenetic affinity ==
On the basis of the surface sculpture, Gregg (1951) considered S. neglecta to be most closely related to S. hachitana. On the basis of the genital anatomy Miller (1967) considered it most closely related to S. imperatrix. Bequaert & Miller (1973) put both S. neglecta and S. imperatrix in the "Sonnorella binneyi complex". A later reanalysis by McCord (1995) also placed S. neglecta with S. binneyi, but S. imperatrix was more distant; however, this work has been criticised.

== Conservation status ==
NatureServe has classified S. neglecta as critically imperiled on account of the few known localities and lack of recent records. This prompted a petition in 2007 to classify S. neglecta, along with hundreds of other species, as "endangered or threatened with critical habitat", which was turned down by the United States Fish and Wildlife Service in 2009. Sonorella neglecta currently has no special state or federal legal status.
