= Ashmunella todseni =

Conservation status
- Critically Imperiled (NatureServe)

Scientific classification
- Kingdom: Animalia
- Phylum: Mollusca
- Class: Gastropoda
- Order: Stylommatophora
- Family: Polygyridae
- Genus: Ashmunella
- Species: A. todseni

Binomial name
- Ashmunella todseni Metcalf & Smartt 1977

Species of gastropod

Ashmunella todseni is a species of air-breathing land snail, a terrestrial pulmonate gastropod mollusk in the family Polygyridae.

== Type specimens ==
=== Holotype ===
The holotype was collected on May 24, 1975 from talus accumulation of igneous rock on the east side of the east branch of Maple Canyon. It is deposited at the Academy of Natural Sciences of Drexel University ANSP 340726.

=== Paratypes ===
Paratypes are deposited at

- Academy of Natural Sciences of Drexel University ANSP 340727
- DelMNH 106683
- UA 6217
- DMNH 4534
- National Museum of Natural History USNM 758528
- University of Texas at El Paso Biodiversity Collections UTEP:ES:4476, UTEP:ES:4744 and UTEP:ES:4746

== Distribution ==
The species has only been collected from Maple and Texas canyons in the northeastern part of the Organ Mountains.

== Etymology ==
The species is named in honor of Dr. Thomas K. Todsen.
