= Percina brucethompsoni =

Conservation status
- Imperiled (NatureServe)

Scientific classification
- Kingdom: Animalia
- Phylum: Chordata
- Class: Actinopterygii
- Order: Perciformes
- Family: Percidae
- Genus: Percina
- Species: P. brucethompsoni

Binomial name
- Percina brucethompsoni Robinson, Cashner & Near, 2014

Species of fish

Percina brucethompsoni, the Ouachita darter, is a species of freshwater ray-finned fish, a darter from the subfamily Etheostomatinae, part of the family Percidae, which also contains the perches, ruffes and pikeperches. It is endemic to the Ouachita River system in the Ouachita Mountains in Arkansas. When breeding, in the Spring, they are normally found in riffles and fast runs with gravel or pebble substrates at depths of around 1 metre (3.3 ft). They live in deeper pools during the rest of the year.

== Etymology ==
The specific name honors the American ichthyologist Dr. Bruce A. Thompson (1946–2007).

== See also ==
- Arkansas saddled darter: darter endemic to the White River in Arkansas and Missouri
- Paleback darter: darter endemic to the Caddo River in Arkansas
