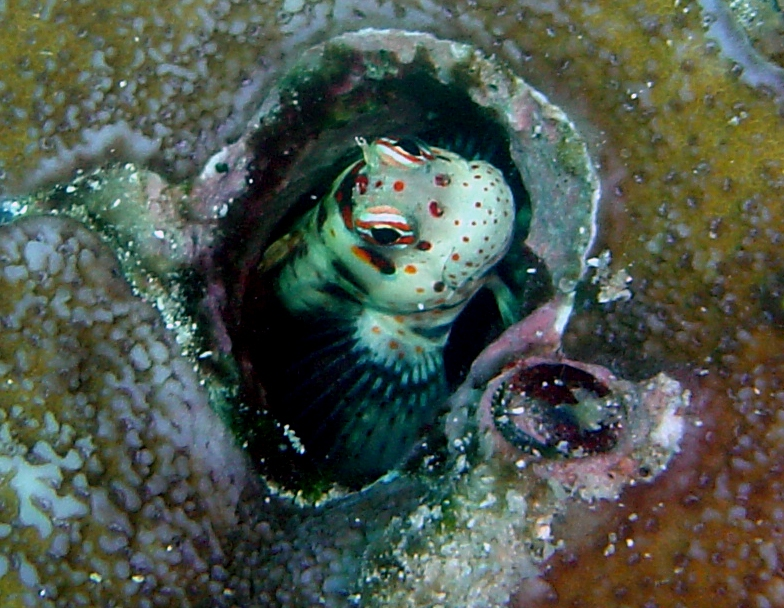

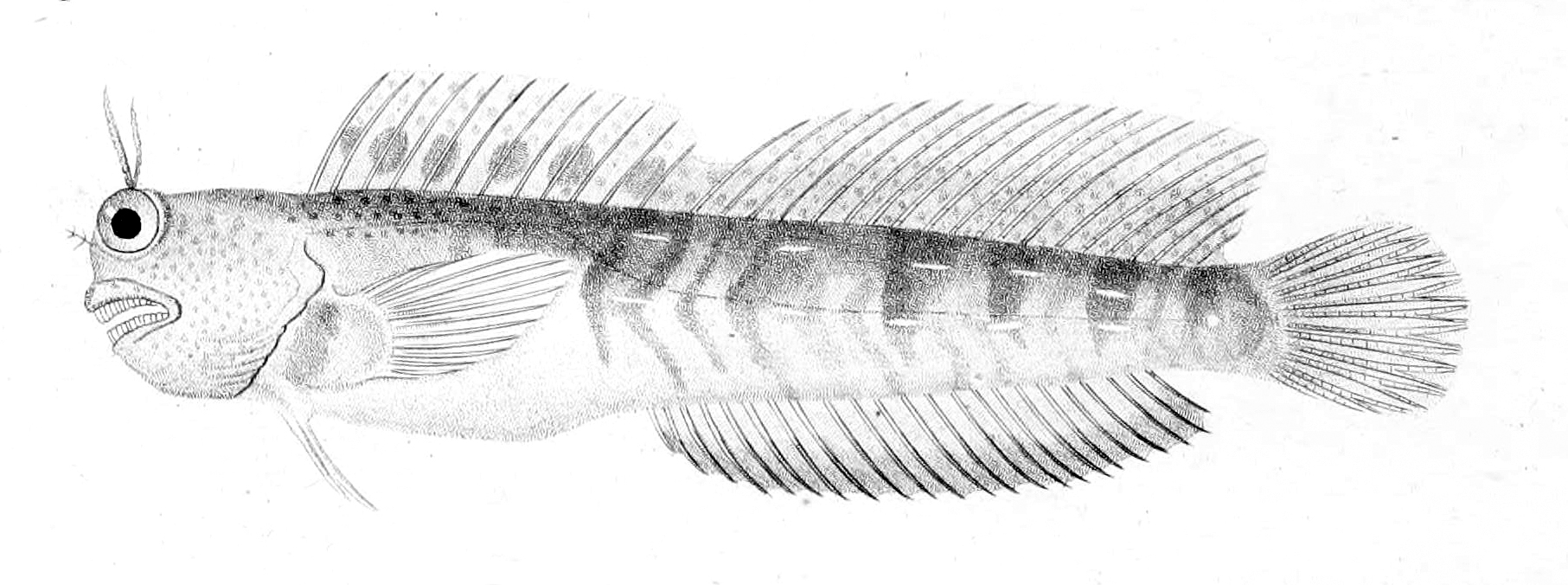

Conservation status
- Least Concern (IUCN 3.1)

Scientific classification
- Kingdom: Animalia
- Phylum: Chordata
- Class: Actinopterygii
- Order: Blenniiformes
- Family: Blenniidae
- Genus: Blenniella
- Species: B. periophthalmus

Binomial name
- Blenniella periophthalmus (Valenciennes, 1836)

Synonyms
- Salarias periophthalmus Valenciennes, 1836; Alticops periophthalmus (Valenciennes, 1836); Istiblennius periophthalmus (Valenciennes, 1836); Salarias percophthalmus Valenciennes, 1836; Salarias biseriatus Valenciennes, 1836; Istiblennius biseriatus (Valenciennes, 1836); Istiblennius periophthalmus biseriatus (Valenciennes, 1836); Salarias schultzei Bleeker, 1859; Salarias muscarus Snyder, 1908

= Blenniella periophthalmus =

Blue-dashed rockskipper

Species of fish

Blenniella periophthalmus is a species of combtooth blenny found in coral reefs in the Pacific and Indian oceans. It is commonly known as the blue-dashed rockskipper, bullethead rockskipper, false rockskipper, or the peppered blenny. B. periophthalmus are oviparous animals and once they lay eggs, the eggs attach to the surface of the sea floor due to an adhesive coating. B. periophthalmus prefer a depth range of 0–3 meters and can have a maximum body length of 10 centimeters.
