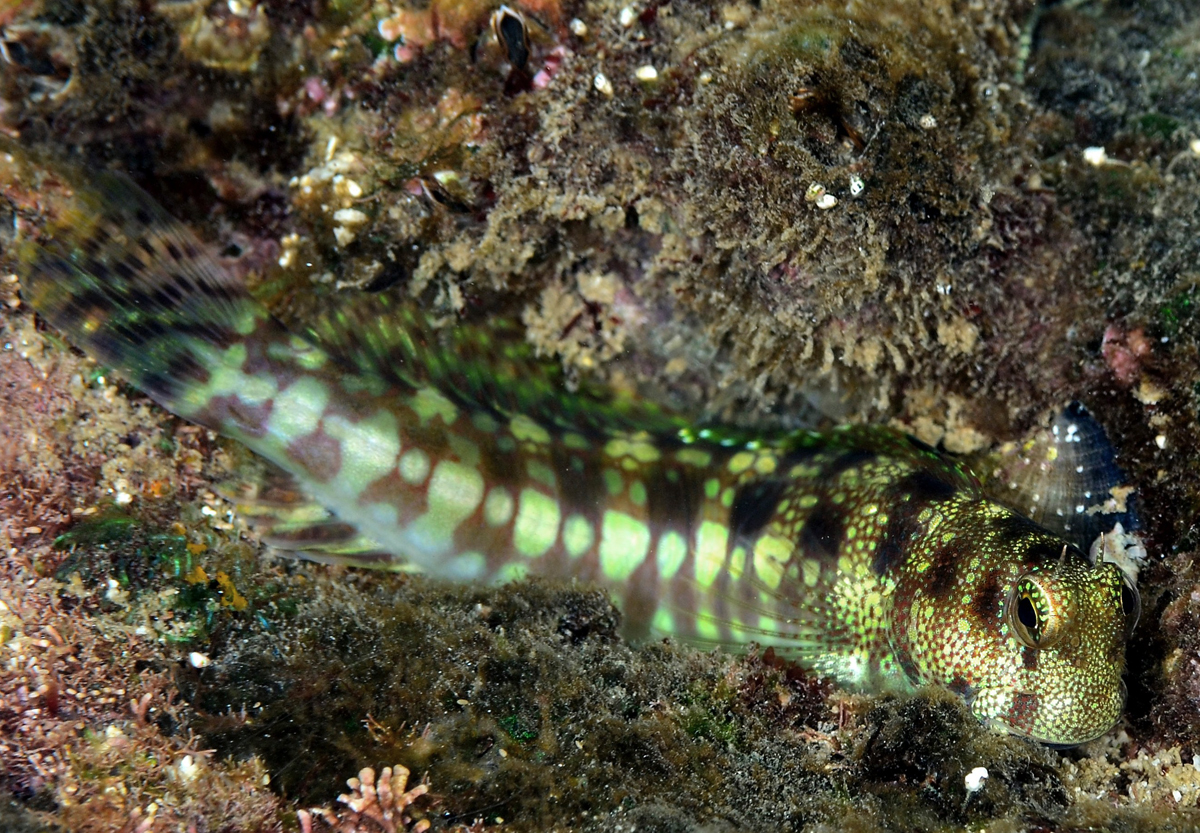

Conservation status
- Least Concern (IUCN 3.1)

Scientific classification
- Kingdom: Animalia
- Phylum: Chordata
- Class: Actinopterygii
- Order: Blenniiformes
- Family: Blenniidae
- Genus: Blenniella
- Species: B. gibbifrons

Binomial name
- Blenniella gibbifrons (Quoy & Gaimard, 1824)

Synonyms
- Alticops gibbifrons (Quoy & Gaimard, 1824; Blenniella rhessodon Reid, 1943; Istiblennius afilinuchalis Schultz & Chapman, 1960; Istiblennius gibbifrons (Quoy & Gaimard, 1824; Istiblennius gibbifrons insolitus Smith, 1959; Istiblennius gibbifrons rodenbaughi Schultz & Chapman, 1960; Istiblennius rodenbaughi Schultz & Chapman, 1960; Salarias gibbifrons Quoy & Gaimard, 1824; Salarias rutilus Jenkins, 1903; Salarias saltans Jenkins, 1903

= Blenniella gibbifrons =

Species of fish

Blenniella gibbifrons, also known as the hump-headed blenny, bullethead rockskipper or picture rockskipper, is a species of combtooth blenny found in coral reefs in the Pacific and Indian Oceans from East Africa in the west to the Hawaiian, Line and Ducie Islands, in the east and north to Marcus Island.

It was first recorded by French biologists Quoy and Gaimard in 1824.

== Biology ==
Blenniella gibbifrons inhabit the shallow water near the shore of intertidal reef flats. They prefer water from 0.5 to 1.5 m deep where the substrate consists of a thin carpet of algal turf and sand. They inhabit the water layer immediately above the bottom (benthic) . They are Oviparous with the eggs and young left to fend for themselves. Eggs are adhesive and are attached to the bottom by a threadlike, adhesive pad or pedestal . Larvae are planktonic and often found swimming in shallow, coastal waters.
