= Arkansas saddled darter =

Conservation status
- Least Concern (IUCN 3.1)

Scientific classification
- Kingdom: Animalia
- Phylum: Chordata
- Class: Actinopterygii
- Division: Teleostei
- Order: Perciformes
- Family: Percidae
- Genus: Etheostoma
- Species: E. euzonum

Binomial name
- Etheostoma euzonum (Hubbs & J.D. Black, 1940)

Synonyms
- Poecilichthys euzonus Hubbs & Black, 1940

Species of fish

The Arkansas saddled darter (Etheostoma euzonum) is a species of freshwater ray-finned fish, a darter from the subfamily Etheostomatinae, part of the family Percidae, which also contains the perches, ruffes and pikeperches. It is endemic to the eastern United States, where it occurs in the White River drainage in Arkansas and Missouri. It occurs in deep, fast gravel and rubble riffles of small to medium rivers. This species can reach a length of 12.0 cm (4.7 in).

== See also ==
- Paleback darter: darter endemic to the Caddo River in Arkansas
- Percina brucethompsoni: darter endemic to the Ouachita River in Arkansas
