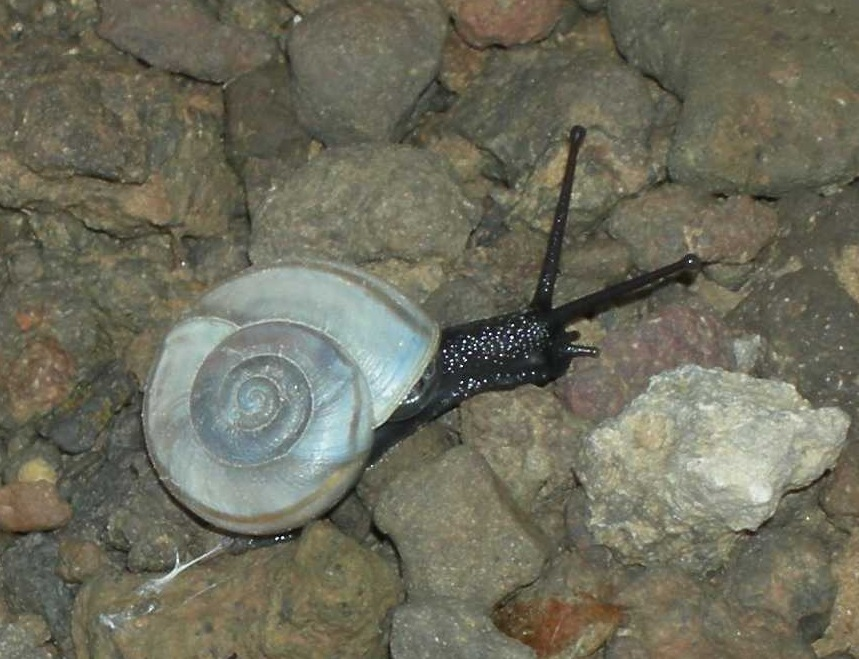
- Sonorella allynsmithi

Scientific classification
- Kingdom: Animalia
- Phylum: Mollusca
- Class: Gastropoda
- Order: Stylommatophora
- Family: Xanthonychidae
- Subfamily: Helminthoglyptinae
- Genus: Sonorella; Pilsbry, 1900

Type species
- Epiphragmorphora hachitana Dall, 1895

= Sonorella =

Genus of gastropods

Sonorella is a genus of land snails in the subfamily Helminthoglyptinae. They are known commonly as talussnails or talus snails because most live in talus and similar habitat. They are distributed across the southwestern United States and adjacent Mexico. There are about 80 species.

== Species ==
Species include:

- Sonorella allynsmithi – Phoenix talussnail
- Sonorella ambigua – Papago talussnail
- Sonorella anchana – Sierra Ancha talussnail, wreathed cactussnail
- Sonorella animasensis – Animas talussnail, bicolored cactussnail
- Sonorella apache – Apache talussnail
- Sonorella ashmuni – Richinbar talussnail
- Sonorella baboquivariensis – Baboquivari talussnail
- Sonorella bagnarai – Rincon talussnail
- Sonorella bartschi – Escabrosa talussnail
- Sonorella bequaerti – Happy Valley talussnail
- Sonorella bicipitis – Dos Cabezas talussnail
- Sonorella binneyi – Horseshoe Canyon talussnail
- Sonorella bowiensis – Quartzite Hill talussnail
- Sonorella bradshaveana – Bradshaw talussnail
- Sonorella caerulifluminis – blue talussnail
- Sonorella christenseni – Clark Peak talussnail
- Sonorella clappi – Madera talussnail
- Sonorella coloradoensis – Grand Canyon talussnail
- Sonorella coltoniana – Walnut Canyon talussnail
- Sonorella compar – Oak Creek talussnail
- Sonorella dalli – Garden Canyon talussnail
- Sonorella danielsi – Bear Canyon talussnail
- Sonorella delicata – Tollhouse Canyon talussnail
- Sonorella dragoonensis – Stronghold Canyon talussnail
- Sonorella eremita – San Xavier talussnail
- Sonorella ferrissi – Dragoon talussnail
- Sonorella franciscana – St. Francis talussnail
- Sonorella galiurensis – Galiuro talussnail
- Sonorella grahamensis – Pinaleno talussnail
- Sonorella granulatissima – Ramsey Canyon talussnail
- Sonorella hachitana – New Mexico talussnail (the type species)
- Sonorella huachucana – Huachuca talussnail
- Sonorella imitator – mimic talussnail
- Sonorella imperatrix – Total Wreck talussnail
- Sonorella imperialis – Empire Mountain talussnail
- Sonorella insignis – Whetstone talussnail
- Sonorella macrophallus – Wet Canyon talussnail
- Sonorella magdalenensis – Sonoran talussnail
- Sonorella meadi – Agua Dulce talussnail
- Sonorella metcalfi – Franklin Mountain talussnail
- Sonorella micra – pygmy talussnail
- Sonorella micromphala – Milk Ranch talussnail
- Sonorella milleri – Table Top talussnail
- Sonorella mustang – Mustang talussnail
- Sonorella neglecta – Portal talussnail
- Sonorella odorata – pungent talussnail
- Sonorella optata – Big Emigrant talussnail
- Sonorella orientis – Organ Mountain talussnail
- Sonorella papagorum – Black Mountain talussnail
- Sonorella parva – little talussnail
- Sonorella reederi – rampart talussnail
- Sonorella rinconensis – Posta Quemada talussnail
- Sonorella rooseveltiana – Roosevelt talussnail
- Sonorella russelli – Black Mesa talussnail
- Sonorella sabinoensis – Santa Catalina talussnail
- Sonorella santaritana – Agua Caliente talussnail
- Sonorella simmonsi – Picacho talussnail
- Sonorella sitiens – Las Guijas talussnail
- Sonorella superstitionis – Superstition Mountain talussnail
- Sonorella todseni – Doña Ana talussnail
- Sonorella tortillita – Tortolita talussnail
- Sonorella tryoniana – Sanford talussnail
- Sonorella vespertina – evening talussnail
- Sonorella virilis – Chiricahua talussnail
- Sonorella walkeri – Santa Rita talussnail
- Sonorella waltoni – Doubtful Canyon talussnail
- Sonorella xanthenes – Kitt Peak talussnail
