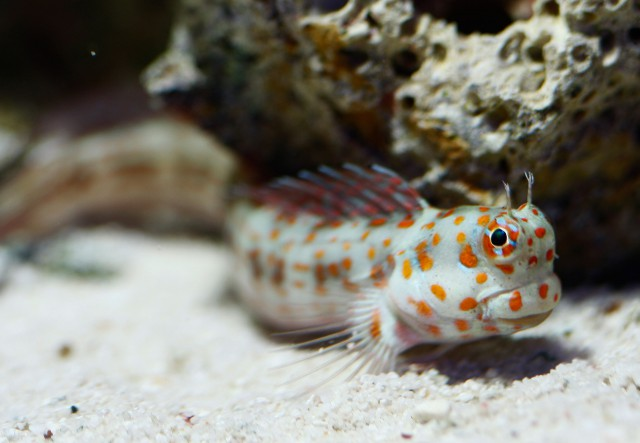

Conservation status
- Least Concern (IUCN 3.1)

Scientific classification
- Kingdom: Animalia
- Phylum: Chordata
- Class: Actinopterygii
- Order: Blenniiformes
- Family: Blenniidae
- Genus: Blenniella
- Species: B. chrysospilos

Binomial name
- Blenniella chrysospilos (Bleeker, 1857)

Synonyms
- Salarias chrysospilos Bleeker, 1857; Istiblennius chrysospilos (Bleeker, 1857); Salarias coronatus Günther, 1872; Istiblennius coronatus (Günther, 1872); Salarias belemnites De Vis, 1884; Salarias bryani Jordan & Seale, 1906; Alticus evermanni Jordan & Seale, 1906; Salarias aureopuncticeps Fowler, 1946; Salarias unimaculatus Aoyagi, 1954; Istiblennius insulinus J. L. B. Smith, 1959

= Blenniella chrysospilos =

Red-spotted blenny

Species of fish

Blenniella chrysospilos, the red-spotted blenny, is a species of combtooth blenny found in coral reefs in the Pacific and Indian oceans; it is native to Fiji and the Maldives.

The orange-spotted blenny is just one of over 400 species of combtooth blennies. It is also called a Redspotted Blenny or Red-spotted Rockskipper. It should not be confused with Hypleurochilus springeri, which is also called an orange-spotted blenny. It is popular with aquarium enthusiasts. It can grow about 12.7 cm long. It is pale white or gray in color with light brown blotches and numerous orange spots and stripes. It's long dorsal fin resembles a comb. It has a compact face with large multicolored eyes. They are peaceful algae eaters but can be territorial around other blenny. They like to hide their slender bodies in small crevices so that only their face sticks out.
