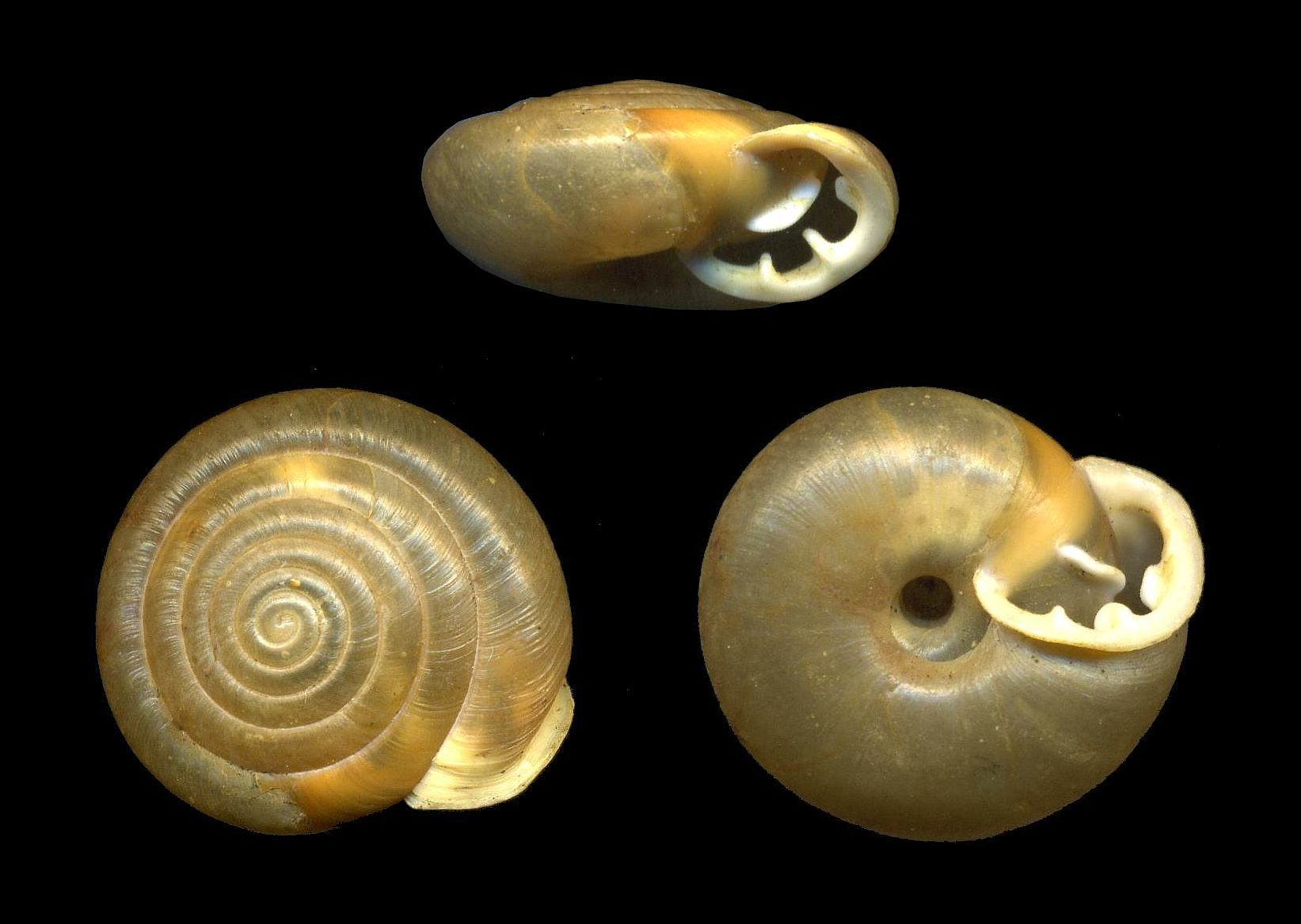
- shell of Ashmunella levettei antigyra

Conservation status
- Critically Imperiled (NatureServe)

Scientific classification
- Kingdom: Animalia
- Phylum: Mollusca
- Class: Gastropoda
- Order: Stylommatophora
- Family: Polygyridae
- Genus: Ashmunella
- Species: A. levettei

Binomial name
- Ashmunella levettei (Bland, 1882)

= Ashmunella levettei =

Species of gastropod

Ashmunella levettei is a species of air-breathing land snail, a terrestrial pulmonate gastropod mollusc in the family Polygyridae.
