= Blenniella interrupta =

Dashed-line blenny

Conservation status
- Least Concern (IUCN 3.1)

Scientific classification
- Kingdom: Animalia
- Phylum: Chordata
- Class: Actinopterygii
- Order: Blenniiformes
- Family: Blenniidae
- Genus: Blenniella
- Species: B. interrupta

Binomial name
- Blenniella interrupta (Bleeker, 1857)

Synonyms
- Salarias interruptus Bleeker, 1857; Istiblennius interruptus (Bleeker, 1857)

Species of fish

Blenniella interrupta, the dashed-line blenny, is a species of combtooth blenny found in coral reefs in the western Pacific ocean.
