= Elizabeth Jane Letson Bryan =

American malacologist (1874–1919)

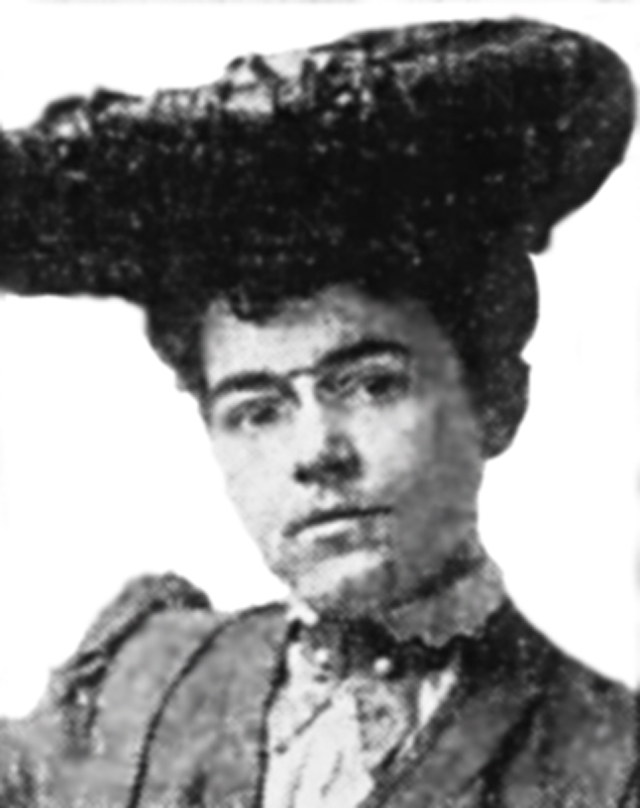
- Born: April 9, 1874; Griffins Mills, New York, US
- Died: February 28, 1919 (age 44)
- Burial place: Oakwood Cemetery, East Aurora, New York
- Education: Alfred University
- Known for: Director of the Buffalo Museum of Science

Elizabeth Letson Bryan (April 9, 1874 – February 28, 1919) was an American malacologist and director of the museum of the Buffalo Society of Natural Sciences, now the Buffalo Museum of Science in Buffalo, New York. She was one of the first female museum directors in the United States.

== Early life and education ==
Elizabeth "Jennie" Letson was born on April 9, 1874, in Griffins Mills, New York. She was the only child of Augustus Franklin Letson (1841-1900) and Nellie Webb Letson (1850-1924). Her mother was an 8th-generation direct descendant of Puritan colonist William Bradford, who came to North America on the Mayflower.

Bryan attended schools in Buffalo, New York. At an early age, she became interested in natural history, particularly conchology. After graduating, Bryan continued her education at the Academy of Natural Sciences of Philadelphia after receiving the Jessup fellowship. She spent two years working with Henry Augustus Pilsbry. Later, Bryan studied at the United States National Museum in Washington, D.C. In 1906, Alfred University conferred upon her the honorary degree of Doctor of Science.

== Career ==
At the age of 18, Bryan started working at the Buffalo Society of Natural Sciences in 1892, where she would remain for 17 years. At first, she volunteered to clean the museum and arrange the library. She eventually rose to the position on Director of the Museum of the Buffalo Society of Natural Sciences in 1899. Elizabeth married William Alanson Bryan on March 16, 1909, at St. Paul's Episcopal Church in Buffalo, New York. They moved to Hawaii in May 1909, where her husband was a professor at the College of Hawaii. She worked as the librarian at the college. While living in Hawaii, she continued to collect marine shells and assist her husband with his research publications.

Bryan was a member of the American Anthropological Society, the National Geographic Society, the American Association for the Advancement of Science, the Audubon Society of Pennsylvania, the New York State committee for the Women's Out-of-door Art League, the American Civic Association, the Conchological Society of Great Britain and Ireland, the Buffalo Society, and the Mayflower Society of New York State.

== Death ==
Bryan died at 11:20 PM on February 28, 1919, in Honolulu, Hawaii of heart disease. Her mentor, Henry A. Pilsbry wrote her obituary in The Nautilus, a journal of malacology.

== Species named in honor of Elizabeth Letson ==
- Amnicola letsoni (Walker, 1901)
- Tellina (Arcopagia) elizabethae (Pilsbry, 1917) type number 80253 stored at Academy of Natural Sciences in Philadelphia
- Turbonilla (Evaletta) elizabethae (Pilsbry, 1917) type number 117596 at Academy of Natural Sciences in Philadelphia

== Publications ==
- Sinstral ampullaria (1897)
- Description of a New Tethys (Aplysia) (1898)
- Post-pliocene fossils of the Niagara river gravels (1901)
- Check List of the Mollusca of New York (1905)
- A Partial List of the Shells Found in Erie and Niagara Counties and Niagara Frontier (1909)

== Species named by Elizabeth Letson ==
- Tethys pilsbryi (Letson, 1898)
