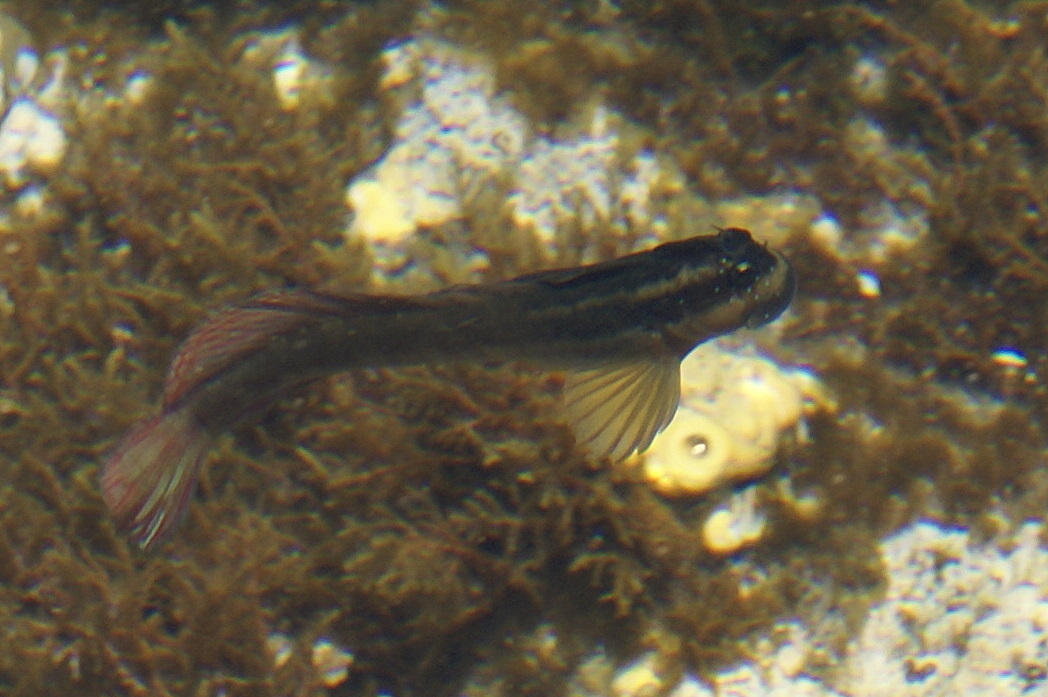

Conservation status
- Least Concern (IUCN 3.1)

Scientific classification
- Kingdom: Animalia
- Phylum: Chordata
- Class: Actinopterygii
- Order: Blenniiformes
- Family: Blenniidae
- Genus: Blenniella
- Species: B. cyanostigma

Binomial name
- Blenniella cyanostigma (Bleeker, 1849)

Synonyms
- Salarias cyanostigma Bleeker, 1849; Istiblennius cyanostigma (Bleeker, 1849); Salarias fronto Günther, 1861; Salarias andamensis Day, 1870; Istiblennius andamanensis (Day, 1870); Istiblennius andamensis (Day, 1870); Salarias striolatus Day, 1876; Entomacrodus calurus Fowler, 1904

= Blenniella cyanostigma =

Striped rockskipper

Species of fish

Blenniella cyanostigma, the striped rockskipper, is a species of combtooth blenny found in coral reefs in the Indian Ocean.
