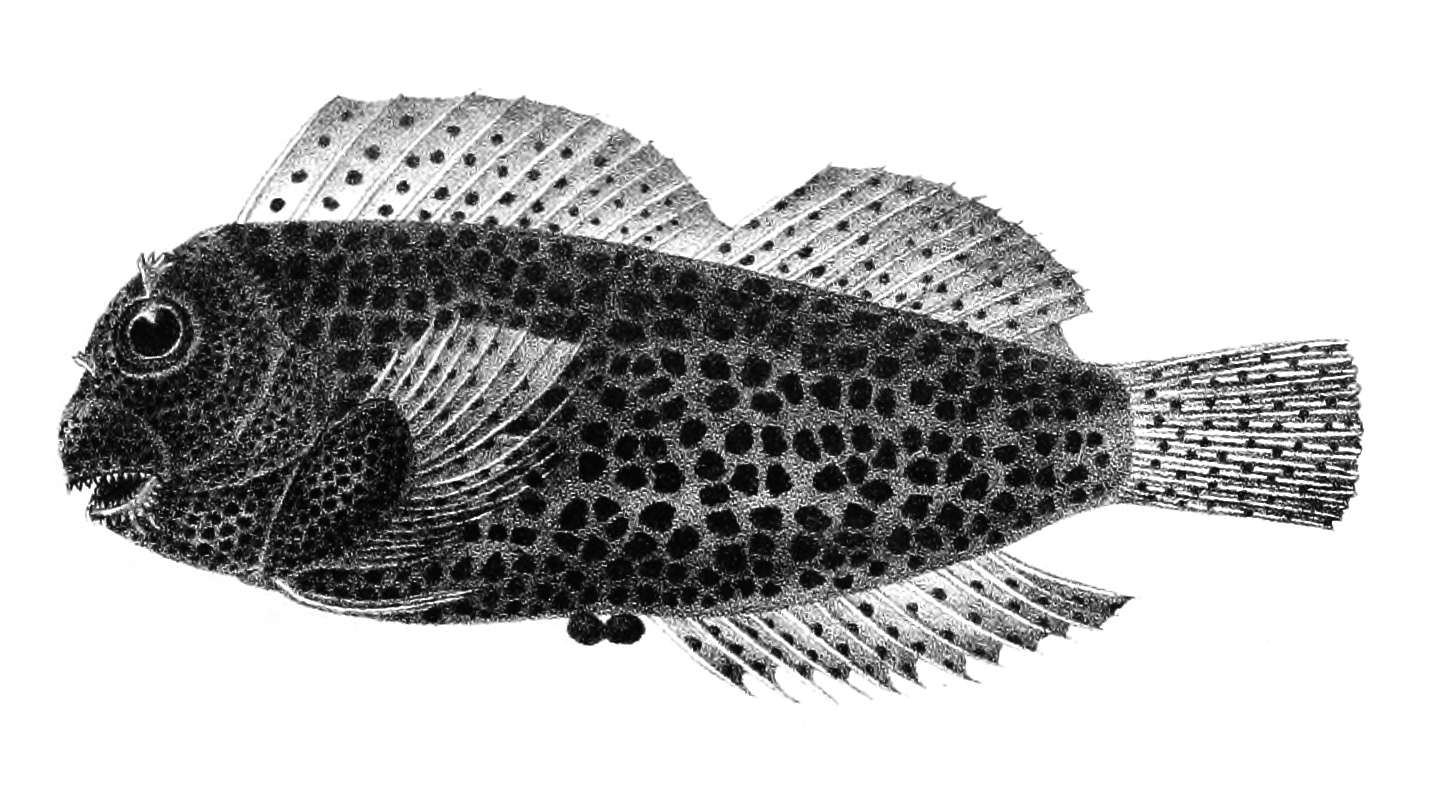

Conservation status
- Least Concern (IUCN 3.1)

Scientific classification
- Kingdom: Animalia
- Phylum: Chordata
- Class: Actinopterygii
- Order: Blenniiformes
- Family: Blenniidae
- Genus: Blenniella
- Species: B. leopardus

Binomial name
- Blenniella leopardus (Fowler, 1904)

Synonyms
- Entomacrodus leopardus Fowler, 1904; Salarias bleekeri Chapman, 1951

= Blenniella leopardus =

Species of fish

Blenniella leopardus, the leopard blenniella , is a species of combtooth blenny found in the eastern Indian Ocean from Sumatra north to the Andaman Islands. It can reach a maximum length of 6 centimetres (2.4 in) SL.
