= Blenniella caudolineata =

Blue-spotted blenny

Conservation status
- Least Concern (IUCN 3.1)

Scientific classification
- Kingdom: Animalia
- Phylum: Chordata
- Class: Actinopterygii
- Order: Blenniiformes
- Family: Blenniidae
- Genus: Blenniella
- Species: B. caudolineata

Binomial name
- Blenniella caudolineata (Günther, 1877)

Synonyms
- Salarias caudolineatus Günther, 1877; Salarias beani Fowler, 1928

Species of fish

Blenniella caudolineata, the blue-spotted blenny, is a species of combtooth blenny found in coral reefs in the Pacific ocean.
