= Henry Augustus Pilsbry =

American biologist and carcinologist (1862–1957)

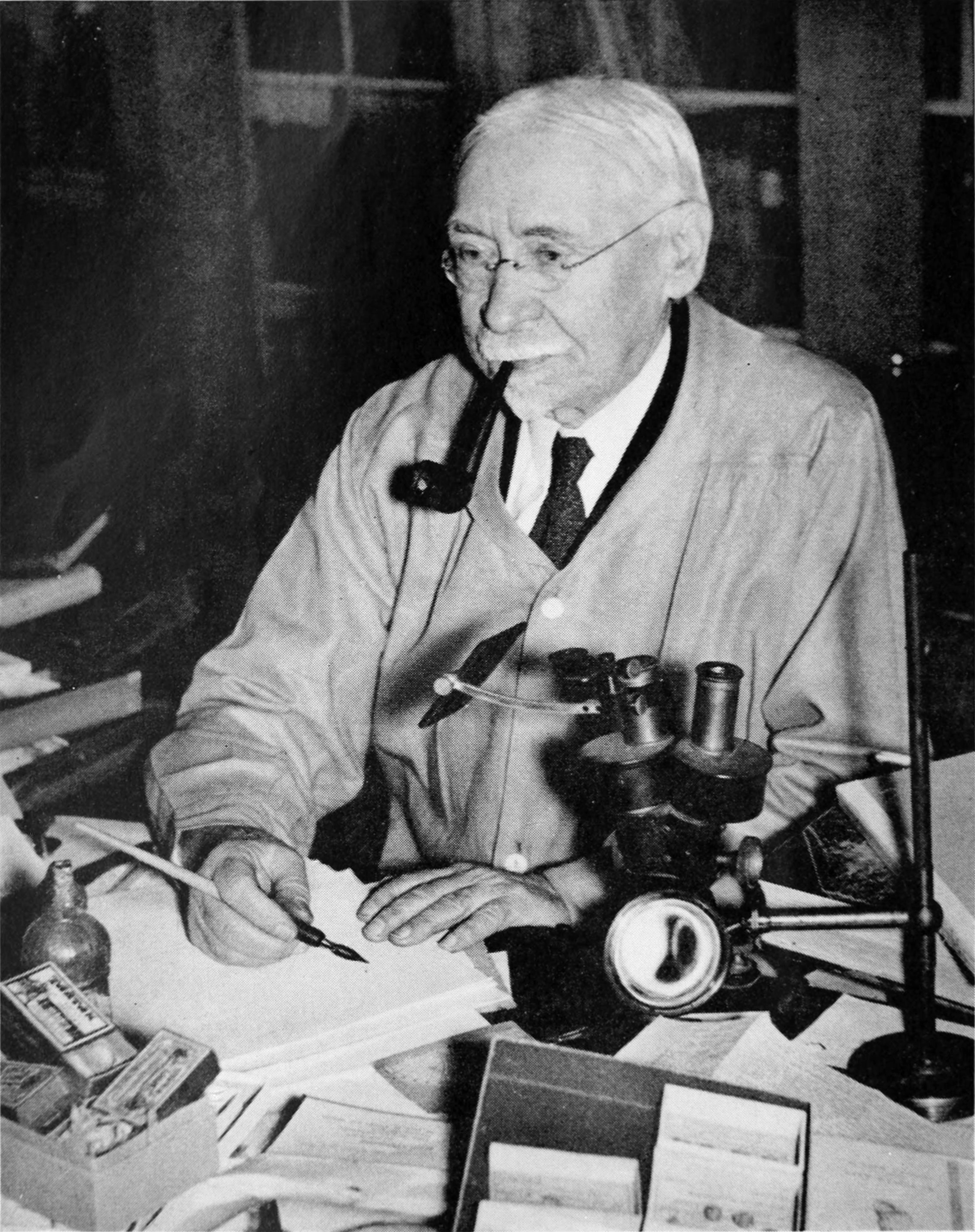
- Henry Augustus Pilsbry
- Born: December 7, 1862; Iowa City, Iowa
- Died: October 26, 1957 (aged 94); Lantana, Florida
- Education: University of Iowa
- Awards: Leidy Award (1928)
- Scientific career
- Fields: Malacology
- Workplaces: Academy of Natural Sciences
- Academic advisors: George Washington Tryon
- Author abbrev. (zoology): Pilsbry

Henry Augustus Pilsbry (7 December 1862 – 26 October 1957) was an American biologist, malacologist and carcinologist, among other areas of study. He was a dominant presence in many fields of invertebrate taxonomy for the better part of a century. For much of his career, his authority with respect to the classification of certain substantial groups of organisms was unchallenged: barnacles, chitons, North American terrestrial mollusks, and others.

== Biography ==
Pilsbry (frequently misspelled Pilsbury) spent his childhood and youth in Iowa. He was called "Harry" Pilsbry then, and developed an early fascination with the limited variety of mollusks he was able to find. He attended the University of Iowa, and received the Bachelor of Science degree there in 1882, but did not immediately find employment in his field of interest. Instead, Henry Pilsbry worked for publishing firms and newspapers for the next several years, but devoted most of his spare time to the study of mollusks.

In 1887, he found employment in New York City as a proofreader, but soon met George Washington Tryon, the resident expert on mollusks at the Academy of Natural Sciences of Philadelphia, and architect and author of the ongoing multi-volume Manual of Concology. This meeting led, within a few months, to Tryon's hiring Pilsbry as an assistant. He was, no doubt, impressed by the young man's talents as a proofreader, considerable expertise in technical illustration, and especially by his undeniable enthusiasm for the study of mollusks and substantial knowledge of the subject.

Less than three months after Pilsbry began his new job, George Tryon died and his new assistant, only 25 years old, perhaps to the surprise of some, inherited the titles of "Conservator of the Conchology Section" and "Editor" of the Manual of Conchology.

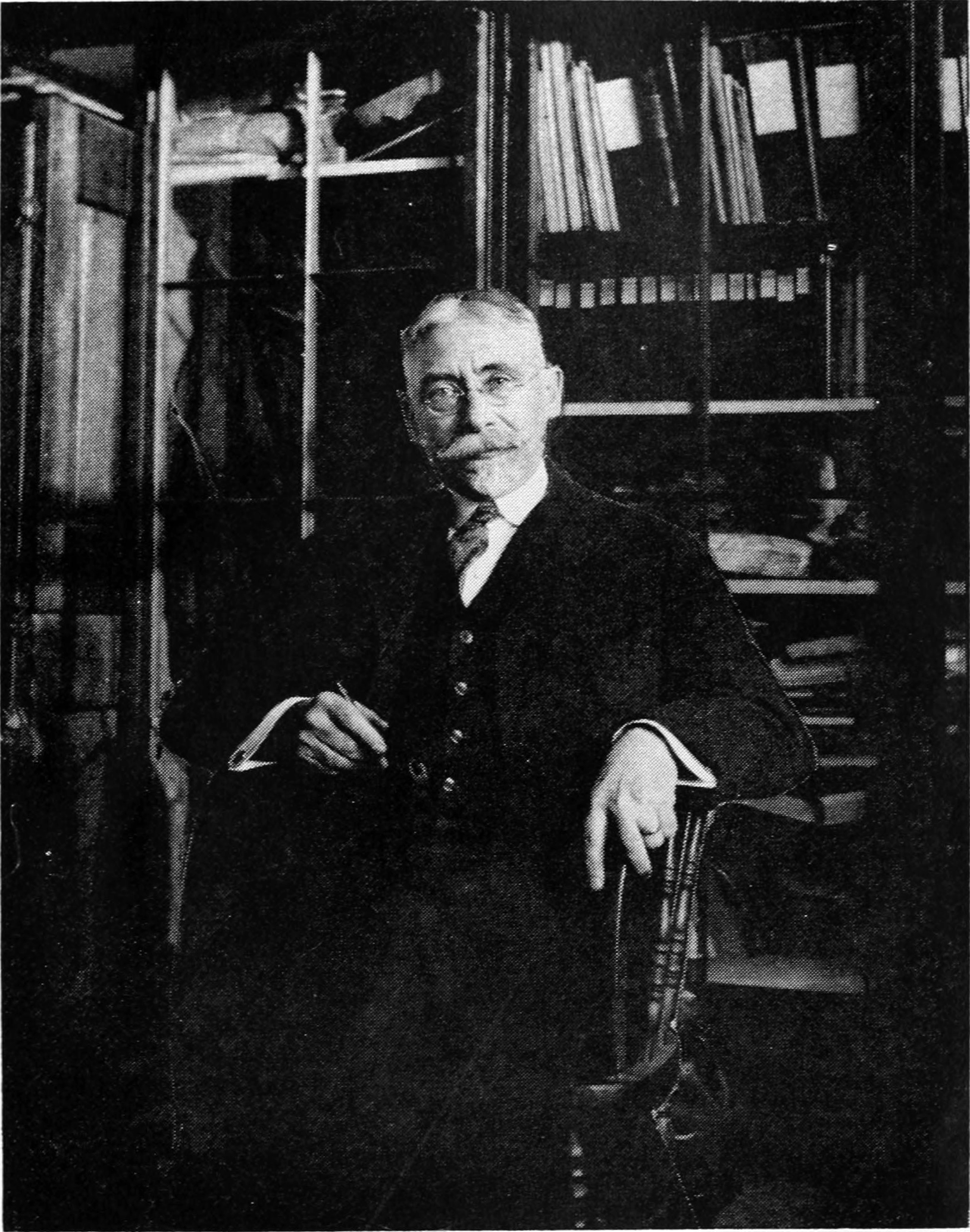
Henry Augustus Pilsbry between 1900–1910.

Pilsbry soon proved capable of prodigious efforts, and his scientific output was remarkable. During the next five years he produced hundreds of detailed pages of the Manual of Conchology, preparing many of the plates himself, and founded The Nautilus, an influential journal of malacology which has survived into the 21st century. He also married during this period, to Adeline Avery. He was elected to the American Philosophical Society in 1895. His college, the University of Iowa, honored him with a Doctor of Science degree in 1899 (and he later received two other honorary doctorates: University of Pennsylvania, 1940, and Temple University, 1941). In 1921, he was elected to the American Academy of Arts and Sciences. In 1929 he participated in the Pinchot South Sea Expedition. Pilsbry was the first president of the American Malacological Union (Society) founded in 1931.

For almost all of the next 57 years of his long life, Henry Pilsbry spent his hours writing scientific papers, over 3,000 of them, mostly while at the Academy of Natural Sciences. Most of his longest papers were published by the Academy. The shorter ones could usually be found in The Nautilus. The large majority of his work carried only his name, although there were sometimes joint or junior authors, some of whom were more patron than scientist. It is notable that Pilsbry did not always confine himself to the several areas of study with which he was already closely associated, but rather would sometimes stray into other fields of science, from geology and paleontology to the taxonomy of brachiopods.

His field work provided a steady supply of new specimens for study, dissection, and illustration, and a seemingly endless array of new species to name. Pilsbry named 5680 organisms; a full list was published in a 218-page volume. Pilsbry performed extensive amounts of field work, and was clearly an expert in dealing with the outdoors, no matter the conditions. He collected mollusks over virtually the entire United States, and in an atlas of countries: Argentina, Australia, Bahamas, Cocos Islands, Cuba, Galapagos Islands, Guatemala, Marquesas Islands, Mexico, Panama, Peru, and other locations as well. His intellectual reach extended even further, through joint efforts with other workers: especially notably Africa with Joseph Bequaert and the Japanese region with Yoichiro Hirase.

Pilsbry suffered a heart attack in late 1957 while working at the Philadelphia Academy. He seemed to recover from this serious occurrence, but died at his winter home in Florida, about a month and a half later, from a similar event.

Henry Augustus Pilsbry is buried in Bala Cynwyd, Pennsylvania, at St. Asaph's Church.

== Tribute ==
A species of Cuban dwarf boa, Tropidophis pilsbryi, is named in his honor.

A species of mollusk, Tethys pilsbyi, was named in his honor by a former student and malacologist, Elizabeth "Jennie" Letson.

== Bibliography ==
=== Manual of Conchology ===
Pilsbry was an assistant was of George Washington Tryon for two years, from 1887 to 1888. After Tryon's death in 1888, Pilsbry became an editor of an ongoing multi-volume Manual of Conchology. He is credited (at title page) in Manual of Conchology since volume 12 from 1890.

=== Selected major works ===
- Pilsbry H. A. (14 May 1889). "New and little known American mollusks, no. I." Proceedings of the Academy of Natural Sciences of Philadelphia 41: 81–89, pl. 3.
- Pilsbry H. A. (25 February 1890). "New and little known American mollusks, no. II." Proceedings of the Academy of Natural Sciences of Philadelphia 41: 411–416, pl. 12.
- Pilsbry H. A. 21 (October 1890). "New and little known American mollusks, no. 3." Proceedings of the Academy of Natural Sciences of Philadelphia 42: 296–302, pl. 5.
- Pilsbry H. A. (1895). Catalogue of the Marine Mollusks of Japan, with Descriptions of New Species, and Notes on Others Collected by Frederick Stearns. Detroit: F. Stearns. 196 p. [includes 30 species of modern brachiopods]
- Pilsbry H. A. (1900). "Mollusca of the Great Smoky Mountains". Proceedings of the Academy of Natural Sciences of Philadelphia 52: 110–150.
- Pilsbry H. A. (1900). "Note on Polynesian and East Indian Pupidae". Proceedings of the Academy of Natural Sciences of Philadelphia 52: 431–433.
- Pilsbry H. A. (1902). "New land Mollusca from Japan and the Bonin Islands". Proceedings of the Academy of Natural Sciences of Philadelphia 54: 25–32.
- Pilsbry H. A. (1902). "New land Mollusca from Idaho". Proceedings of the Academy of Natural Sciences of Philadelphia 54: 593.
- Pilsbry, H. A., (1904). New Japanese marine Mollusca: Gastropoda. Proceedings of the Academy of Natural Sciences of Philadelphia, 56
- Pilsbry H. A. (1905). "Mollusca of the Southwestern States, I: Urocoptidae; Helicidae of Arizona and New Mexico". Proceedings of the Academy of Natural Sciences of Philadelphia 57: 211–290.
- Pilsbry H. A. & Y. Hirase. (1905). "Catalogue of the Land and Fresh Water Molluscs of Taiwan (Formosa), with description of new species". Proceedings of the Academy of Natural Sciences of Philadelphia 57: 720–752.
- Pilsbry H. A. & Ferris J. H. (1906). "Mollusca of Southern States. II". Proceedings of the Academy of Natural Sciences of Philadelphia 58: 123–175.
- Pilsbry H. A. (1907). "The Barnacles (Cirripedia) Contained in the Collections of the U.S. National Museum". Bul. United States National Museum 60. 122 p.
- Pilsbry H. A. & Ferriss J. H. (1907). "Mollusca of the Ozarkian Fauna". Proceedings of the Academy of Natural Sciences of Philadelphia 58: 529–567.
- Pilsbry H. A. & Ferriss J. H. (1910). "Mollusca of the Southwestern States, III: The Huachuca Mountains, Arizona". Proceedings of the Academy of Natural Sciences of Philadelphia 61: 495–516.
- Pilsbry H. A. & Ferriss J. H. (1910). "Mollusca of the Southwestern States: IV. The Chiricahua Mountains, Arizona". Proceedings of the Academy of Natural Sciences of Philadelphia 62: 44–147.
- Pilsbry H. A. (1911). Non-marine mollusca of Patagonia. Princeton: The University.
- Pilsbry H. A. (1912). "A study of the variation and zoogeography of Liguus in Florida". J. Acad. Nat. Sci. Philadelphia 15(2nd ser.): 429–471.
- Pilsbry H. A. (1915). "Mollusca of the Southwestern States, VI: The Hacheta Grande, Florida, and Peloncillo Mountains, New Mexico". Proceedings of the Academy of Natural Sciences of Philadelphia 68: 323–350.
- Pilsbry H. A. & Ferriss J. H. (1915). "Mollusca of the Southwestern States VII: The Dragoon, Mule, Santa Rita, Baboquivari, and Tucson Ranges, Arizona". Proceedings of the Academy of Natural Sciences of Philadelphia 68: 363–418.
- Pilsbry H. A. (1916). "The Sessile Barnacles (Cirripedia) Contained in the Collections of the U.S. National Museum, including a monograph of the American species". Bul. United States National Museum 93: 366.
- Pilsbry H. A. & Ferriss J. H. (1917). "Mollusca of the Southwestern States VIII: The Black Range, New Mexico". Proceedings of the Academy of Natural Sciences of Philadelphia 69: 83–107.
- Pilsbry H. A. & Ferriss J. H. (1919). "Mollusca of the Southwestern States IX: The Santa Catalina, Rincon, Tortolita and Galiuro Mountains. X. The mountains of the Gila headwaters". Proceedings of the Academy of Natural Sciences of Philadelphia 70: 282–333.
- Pilsbry H. A. & Ferriss J. H. (1923). "Mollusca of the Southwestern States, XI – From the Tucson Range to Ajo, and mountain ranges between the San Padro and Santa Cruz rivers, Arizona". Proceedings of the Academy of Natural Sciences of Philadelphia 75: 47–103.
- Pilsbry H. A. & Bequaert J. (1927). "The Aquatic Mollusks of the Belgian Congo. With a geographical and ecological account of Congo malacology". Bulletin of the American Museum of Natural History 53(2): 69–602. PDF.
- Pilsbry H. A. (1934). "Zoological Results of the Dolan West China Expedition of 1931, Part II, Mollusks". Proceedings of the Academy of Natural Sciences of Philadelphia 86: 5–28.
- Pilsbry H. A. (1939). Land Mollusca of North America north of Mexico vol. I part 1. Acad. Nat. Sci. Philadelphia. pp. 1–574.
- Pilsbry H. A. (1940). Land Mollusca of North America north of Mexico vol. I part 2. Acad. Nat. Sci. Philadelphia. pp. 575–994.
- Pilsbry H. A. (1946). Land Mollusca of North America north of Mexico vol. II part 1. Acad. Nat. Sci. Philadelphia. pp. 1–520.
- Pilsbry H. A. (1948). Land Mollusca of North America north of Mexico vol. II part 2. Acad. Nat. Sci. Philadelphia. pp. 521–1113.
- Pilsbry H. A. (1948). "Inland Mollusks of Northern Mexico. I. The genera Humboldtiana, Sonorella, Oreohelix and Ashmunella". Proceedings of the Academy of Natural Sciences of Philadelphia 100: 185–203. JSTOR 4064418
- Pilsbry H. A. (1953). "Inland Mollusca of Northern Mexico. II. Urocoptidae, Pupillidae, Strobilopsidae, Valloniidae, and Cionellidae". Proceedings of the Academy of Natural Sciences of Philadelphia 105: 133–167. JSTOR 4064472

== See also ==
- Category:Taxa named by Henry Augustus Pilsbry
