= William Alanson Bryan =

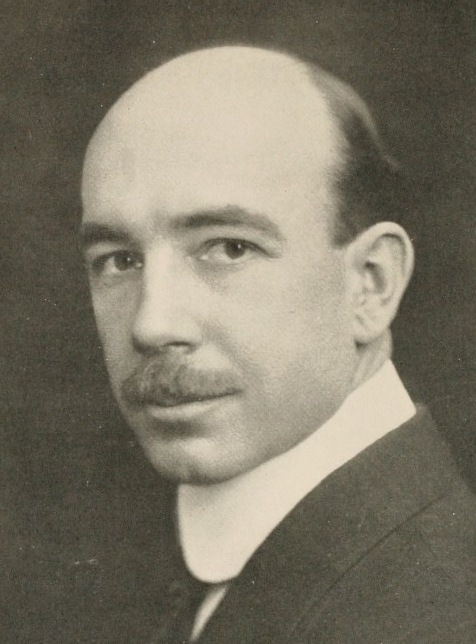
William Alanson Bryan, Hawaii, 1915

William Alanson Bryan (23 December 1875 - 18 June 1942) was an American zoologist, ornithologist, naturalist and museum director.

== Life and work ==
Bryan was born on a farm in New Sharon, Iowa. After his education, and his zoology studies, he graduated in 1896 from Iowa State College. In 1900 he came to Hawaii and took the position of curator of ornithology at the Bernice P. Bishop Museum. In June of the same year he married Ruth May Goss, who died in 1904. In 1907 he left the museum and founded the Pacific Scientific Institution, which aimed to promote biological and anthropological research in the Pacific. He then became a professor of zoology at the Faculty of the College of Hawaii. In 1909 he married Elizabeth Letson Bryan (1874-1919), who worked as mussels and snails collector. Bryan unsuccessfully ran for governor of the Territory of Hawaii in 1913 and 1917. After his wife's death he finished his work at the College of Hawai'i and went to South America. In January 1920, he undertook an expedition to Easter Island.

From 1921 until his retirement in 1940 he was director of the Los Angeles Museum of History, Science and Art.
