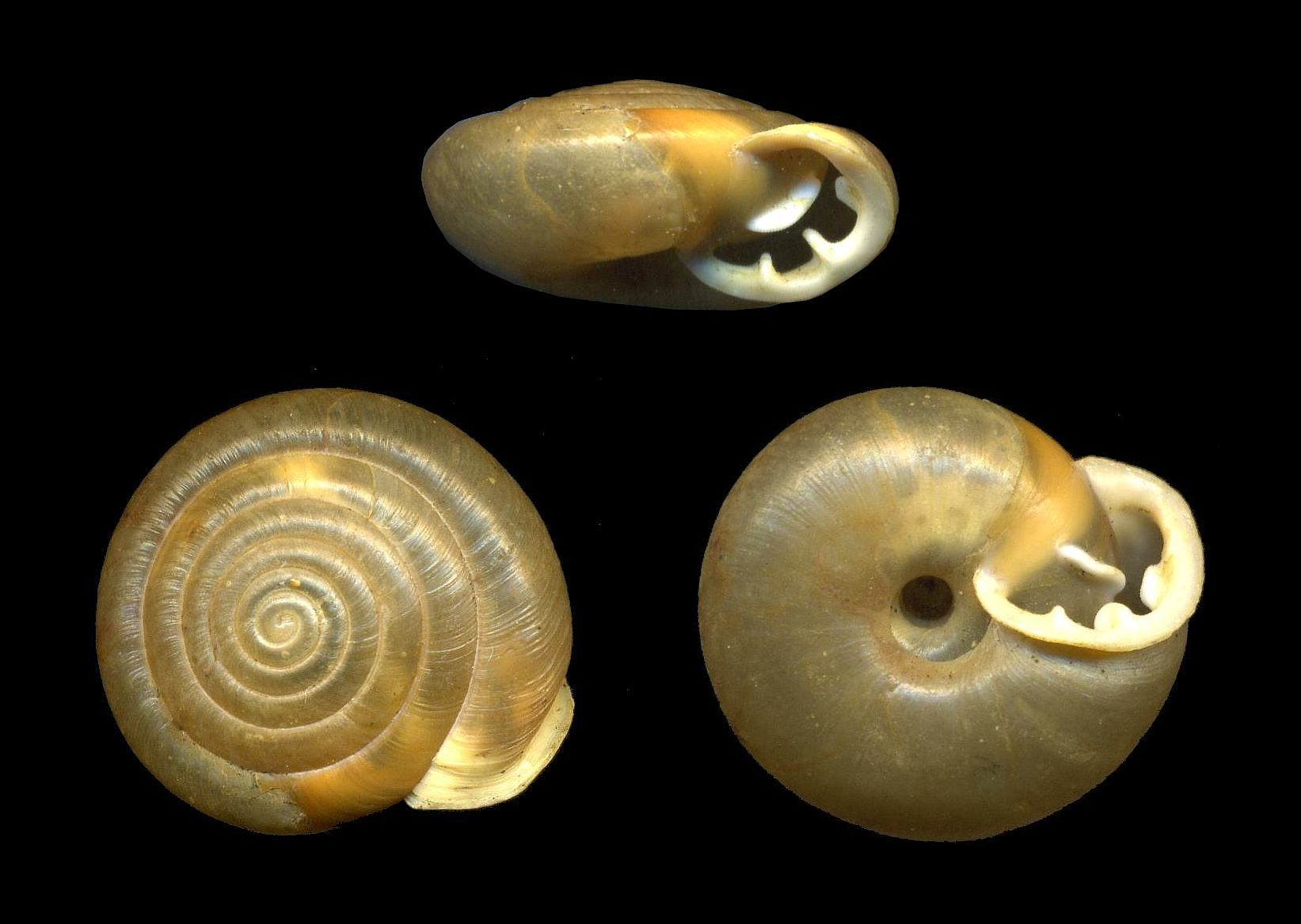
- Ashmunella levettei

Scientific classification
- Kingdom: Animalia
- Phylum: Mollusca
- Class: Gastropoda
- Order: Stylommatophora
- Family: Polygyridae
- Genus: Ashmunella; Pilsbry & Cockerell, 1899

= Ashmunella =

Genus of gastropods

Ashmunella is a genus of small, air-breathing, land snails in the family Polygyridae.

== Species ==
The following species are recognised in the genus Ashmunella:

- Ashmunella altissima (Cockerell, 1898)
- Ashmunella amblya Pilsbry, 1940 – Pine Springs woodland snail
- Ashmunella angulata Pilsbry, 1905 – angulate woodland snail
- Ashmunella animasensis Vagvolgyi, 1974 – Animas Peak woodland snail
- Ashmunella ashmuni (Dall, 1897) – Jemez woodland snail
- Ashmunella auriculata Vagvolgyi, 1974 – Boulder Canyon woodland snail
- Ashmunella bequaerti Clench & W. B. Miller, 1966 – Goat Cave woodland snail
- Ashmunella binneyi Pilsbry & Ferriss, 1917 – Silver Creek woodland snail
- Ashmunella carlsbadensis Pilsbry, 1932 – Guadalupe woodland snail
- Ashmunella chiricahuana (Dall, 1896) – Cave Creek woodland snail
- Ashmunella cockerelli Pilsbry & Ferriss, 1917 – Black Range woodland snail
- Ashmunella danielsi Pilsbry & Ferriss, 1915 – Whitewater Creek woodland snail
- Ashmunella edithae Pilsbry & Cheatum, 1951 – McKittrick woodland snail
- Ashmunella esuritor Pilsbry, 1905 – barefoot woodland snail
- Ashmunella ferrissi Pilsbry, 1905 – Reed's Mountain woodland snail
- Ashmunella harrisi Metcalf & Smartt, 1977 – Goat Mountain woodland snail
- Ashmunella hawleyi Metcalf, 1973
- Ashmunella intricata Pilsbry, 1948
- Ashmunella jamesensis Metcalf, 1973
- Ashmunella juarazensis Pilsbry, 1948
- Ashmunella lenticula Gregg, 1953 – Horseshoe Canyon woodland snail
- Ashmunella lepiderma Pilsbry & Ferriss, 1910 – Whitetail woodland snail
- Ashmunella levettei (Bland, 1882) – Huachuca woodland snail
- Ashmunella macromphala Vagvolgyi, 1974 – Cook's Peak woodland snail
- Ashmunella mearnsii (Dall, 1895) – big hatchet woodland snail
- Ashmunella mendax Pilsbry & Ferriss, 1917 – Iron Creek woodland snail
- Ashmunella meridionalis Pilsbry, 1948
- Ashmunella milesi Reeder, 1993
- Ashmunella miorhyssa (Dall, 1898)
- Ashmunella mogollonensis Pilsbry, 1905 – Mogollon woodland snail
- Ashmunella montivaga Pilsbry, 1948
- Ashmunella mudgei Cheatum, 1971 – Sawtooth Mountain woodland snail
- Ashmunella nana Metcalf & R. W. Fullington, 1976 †
- Ashmunella organensis Pilsbry, 1936 – Organ Mountain woodland snail
- Ashmunella pasonis (Drake, 1951) – Franklin Mountain woodland snail
- Ashmunella pilsbryana Ferriss, 1914 – Blue Mountain woodland snail
- Ashmunella proxima Pilsbry, 1905 – Chiricahua woodland snail
- Ashmunella pseudodonta (Dall, 1897) – Capitan woodland snail
- Ashmunella rhyssa (Dall, 1897) – Sierra Blanca woodland snail
- Ashmunella rileyensis Metcalf & Hurley, 1971 – Mount Riley woodland snail
- Ashmunella ruidosana Metcalf, 1973
- Ashmunella salinasensis Vagvolgyi, 1974 – Salinas Peak woodland snail
- Ashmunella sprouli R. W. Fullington & K. E. Fullington, 1978 – Hell's Canyon woodland snail
- Ashmunella tegillum Metcalf, 1973
- Ashmunella tetrodon Pilsbry & Ferriss, 1915 – Dry Creek woodland snail
- Ashmunella thomsoniana (Ancey, 1887) – Sangre de Cristo woodland snail
- Ashmunella todseni Metcalf & Smartt, 1977 – Maple Canyon woodland snail
- Ashmunella townsendi Bartsch, 1904
- Ashmunella tularosana Metcalf, 1973
- Ashmunella varicifera Ancey, 1901 – Miller Canyon woodland snail
- Ashmunella walkeri Ferriss, 1904 – Florida Mountain woodland snail
- Ashmunella watleyi Metcalf & R. W. Fullington, 1978
