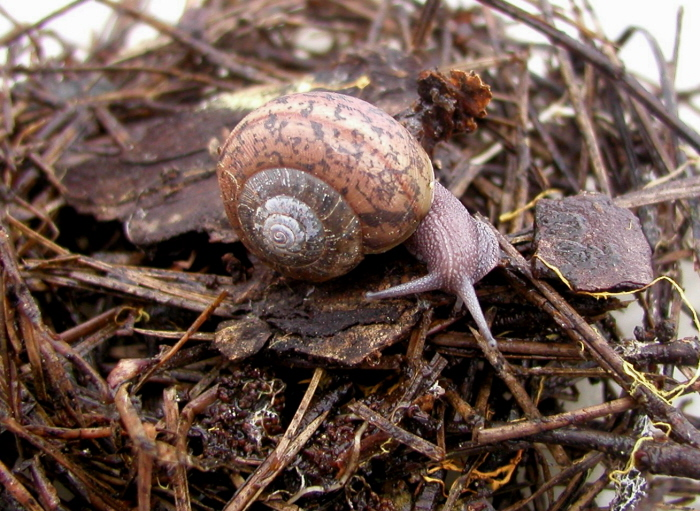
- Helminthoglypta sp.

Scientific classification
- Kingdom: Animalia
- Phylum: Mollusca
- Class: Gastropoda
- Order: Stylommatophora
- Superfamily: Helicoidea
- Family: Xanthonychidae
- Subfamily: Helminthoglyptinae
- Genus: Helminthoglypta; Ancey, 1887

Synonyms
- Helminthoglypta (Charodotes) Pilsbry, 1939· accepted, alternate representation; Helminthoglypta (Coyote) Reeder & B. Roth, 1988· accepted, alternate representation; Helminthoglypta (Helminthoglypta) Ancey, 1887· accepted, alternate representation

= Helminthoglypta =

Genus of gastropods

Helminthoglypta is a genus of air-breathing land snails, terrestrial pulmonate gastropod mollusks in the subfamily Helminthoglyptinae of the family Xanthonychidae.

Species within this genus of snails create and use love darts as part of their mating behavior.

== Species ==
Species within the genus Helminthoglypta include:

- Helminthoglypta allynsmithi, Allyn Smith's banded snail
- Helminthoglypta arrosa (W.G. Binney, 1858)
- Helminthoglypta avus (Bartsch, 1916)
- Helminthoglypta ayresiana (Newcomb, 1861)
- Helminthoglypta benitoensis H.N. Lowe, 1930
- Helminthoglypta berryi Hanna, 1929
- † Helminthoglypta bozemanensis B. Roth, 1986
- Helminthoglypta californiensis (I. Lea, 1838) Point Pinos shoulderband
- Helminthoglypta callistoderma ((Pilsbry & Ferriss, 1919)), Kern shoulderband
- Helminthoglypta carpenteri (Newcomb, 1861)
- Helminthoglypta caruthersi Willett, 1934
- Helminthoglypta coelata (Bartsch, 1916), mesa shoulderband
- Helminthoglypta concolor B. Roth & Hochberg, 1988
- Helminthoglypta contracostae (Pilsbry, 1895)
- Helminthoglypta crotalina S.S. Berry, 1928
- Helminthoglypta cuyama Hanna & A.G. Smith, 1937
- Helminthoglypta cypreophila (W.G. Binney & Bland, 1869)
- Helminthoglypta diabloensis (J.G. Cooper, 1869)
- Helminthoglypta dupetithouarsii (Deshayes, 1840)
- Helminthoglypta edwardsi Gregg & W.B. Miller, 1976
- Helminthoglypta euomphalodes S.S. Berry, 1938
- Helminthoglypta exarata (L. Pfeiffer, 1857)
- Helminthoglypta expansilabris (Pilsbry, 1898)
- Helminthoglypta ferrissi Pilsbry, 1924
- Helminthoglypta fieldi Pilsbry, 1930
- Helminthoglypta fisheri (Bartsch, 1904)
- Helminthoglypta fontiphila Gregg, 1931
- Helminthoglypta graniticola S.S. Berry, 1926
- Helminthoglypta greggi Willett, 1931
- Helminthoglypta hannai Pilsbry, 1927
- Helminthoglypta hertleini Hanna & A.G. Smith, 1937
- Helminthoglypta inglesi S.S. Berry, 1938
- Helminthoglypta isabella S.S. Berry, 1938
- Helminthoglypta jaegeri S.S. Berry, 1928
- Helminthoglypta liodoma S.S. Berry, 1938
- Helminthoglypta mailliardi Pilsbry, 1926
- † Helminthoglypta martini (Hanna, 1920)
- Helminthoglypta micrometalleoides W.B. Miller, 1970
- Helminthoglypta milleri Reeder, 1986
- Helminthoglypta misiona Chase, 1937
- Helminthoglypta mohaveana S.S. Berry, 1927, Victorville shoulderband
- Helminthoglypta montezuma Reeder & W.B. Miller, 1986
- Helminthoglypta morroensis (Hemphill, 1911), Chorro shoulderband
- Helminthoglypta nickliniana (I. Lea, 1838)
- Helminthoglypta orina S.S. Berry, 1938
- Helminthoglypta petricola (S.S. Berry, 1916)
- Helminthoglypta phlyctaena (Bartsch, 1916), Zaca shoulderband
- Helminthoglypta piutensis Willett, 1938
- Helminthoglypta proles (Hemphill in W.G. Binney, 1892)
- Helminthoglypta reederi W. B. Miller, 1981
- Helminthoglypta reediana Willett, 1932
- Helminthoglypta salviae B. Roth, 1987
- Helminthoglypta sanctaecrucis Pilsbry, 1927
- Helminthoglypta sequoicola (J.G. Cooper, 1866)
- Helminthoglypta similans Hanna & A. G. Smith, 1937
- Helminthoglypta sonoma Pilsbry, 1937
- Helminthoglypta stageri Willett, 1938
- Helminthoglypta stiversiana (J.G. Cooper, 1875)
- Helminthoglypta talmadgei B. Roth, 1988
- Helminthoglypta taylori Reeder & B. Roth, 1988
- Helminthoglypta tejonis S.S. Berry, 1930
- Helminthoglypta thermimontis S.S. Berry, 1953
- Helminthoglypta traskii (Newcomb, 1861)
- Helminthoglypta tudiculata (Binney, 1843)
- Helminthoglypta tularensis (Hemphill in W.G. Binney, 1892)
- Helminthoglypta umbilicata (Pilsbry, 1898)
- Helminthoglypta uvasana B. Roth & Hochberg, 1992
- Helminthoglypta vasquezi B. Roth & Hochberg, 1992
- Helminthoglypta venturensis (Bartsch, 1916)
- Helminthoglypta walkeriana (Hemphill, 1911), banded dune snail
- Helminthoglypta waltoni Gregg & W.B. Miller, 1976
- Helminthoglypta willetti (S.S. Berry, 1920)
