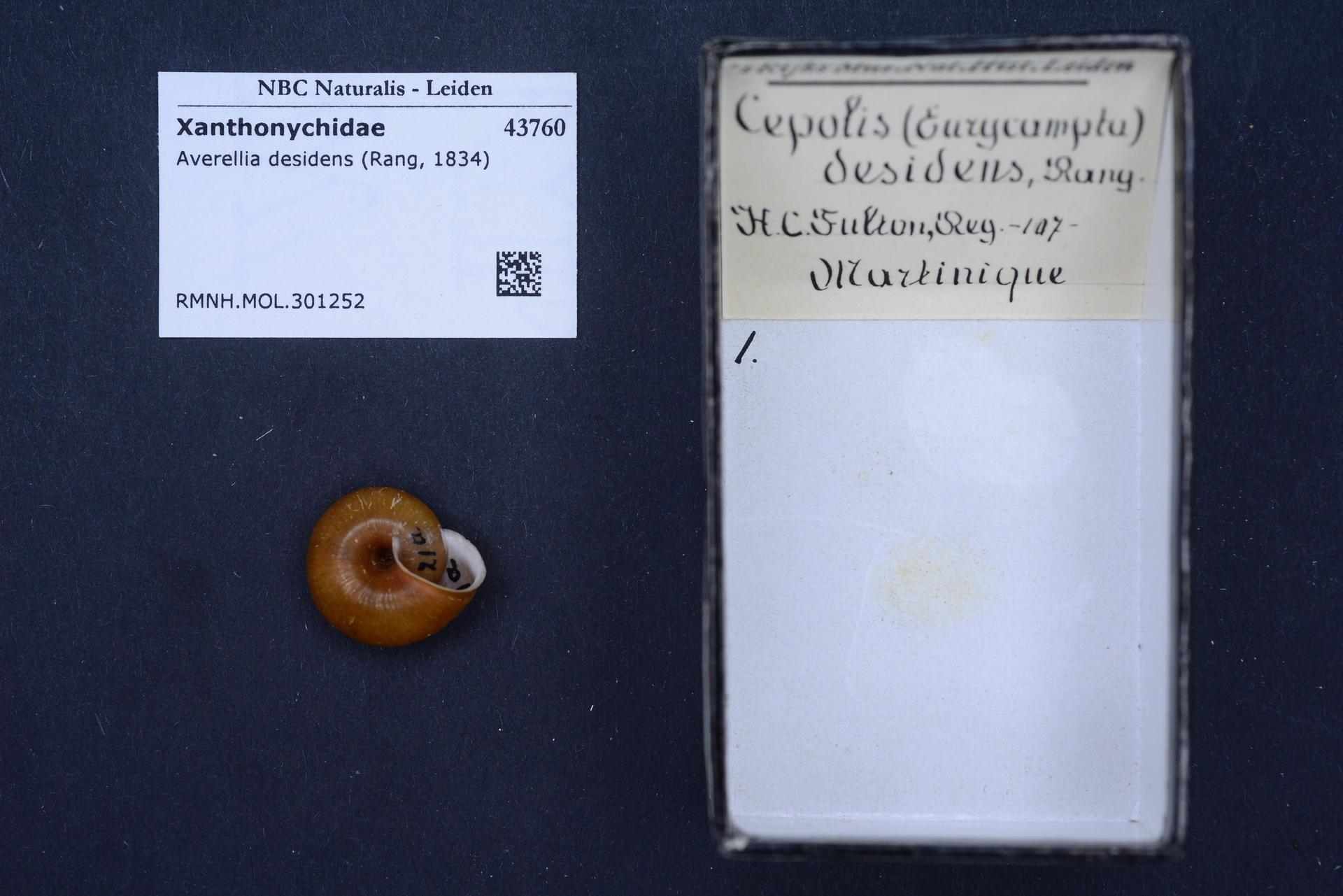
- Averellia desidens shell

Scientific classification
- Kingdom: Animalia
- Phylum: Mollusca
- Class: Gastropoda
- (unranked): clade Heterobranchia clade Euthyneura clade Panpulmonata clade Eupulmonata clade Stylommatophora informal group Sigmurethra
- Superfamily: Xanthonychoidea Strebel & Pfeffer, 1879

= Xanthonychoidea =

Superfamily of gastropods

Xanthonychoidea is a superfamily of air-breathing land snails, land slugs and semi-slugs, terrestrial pulmonate gastropod molluscs in the clade Stylommatophora.

== Taxonomy ==
=== 2005 taxonomy ===
The taxon Xanthonychoidea was not used in the taxonomy of the Gastropoda by Bouchet & Rocroi, 2005. The family Xanthonychidae was placed within the superfamily Helicoidea.

=== 2012 taxonomy ===
Thompson & Naranjo-García (2012) described a new family Echinichidae and placed it to the superfamily Xanthonychoidea.

Families within the Xanthonychoidea include:

- Echinichidae
- Xanthonychidae
