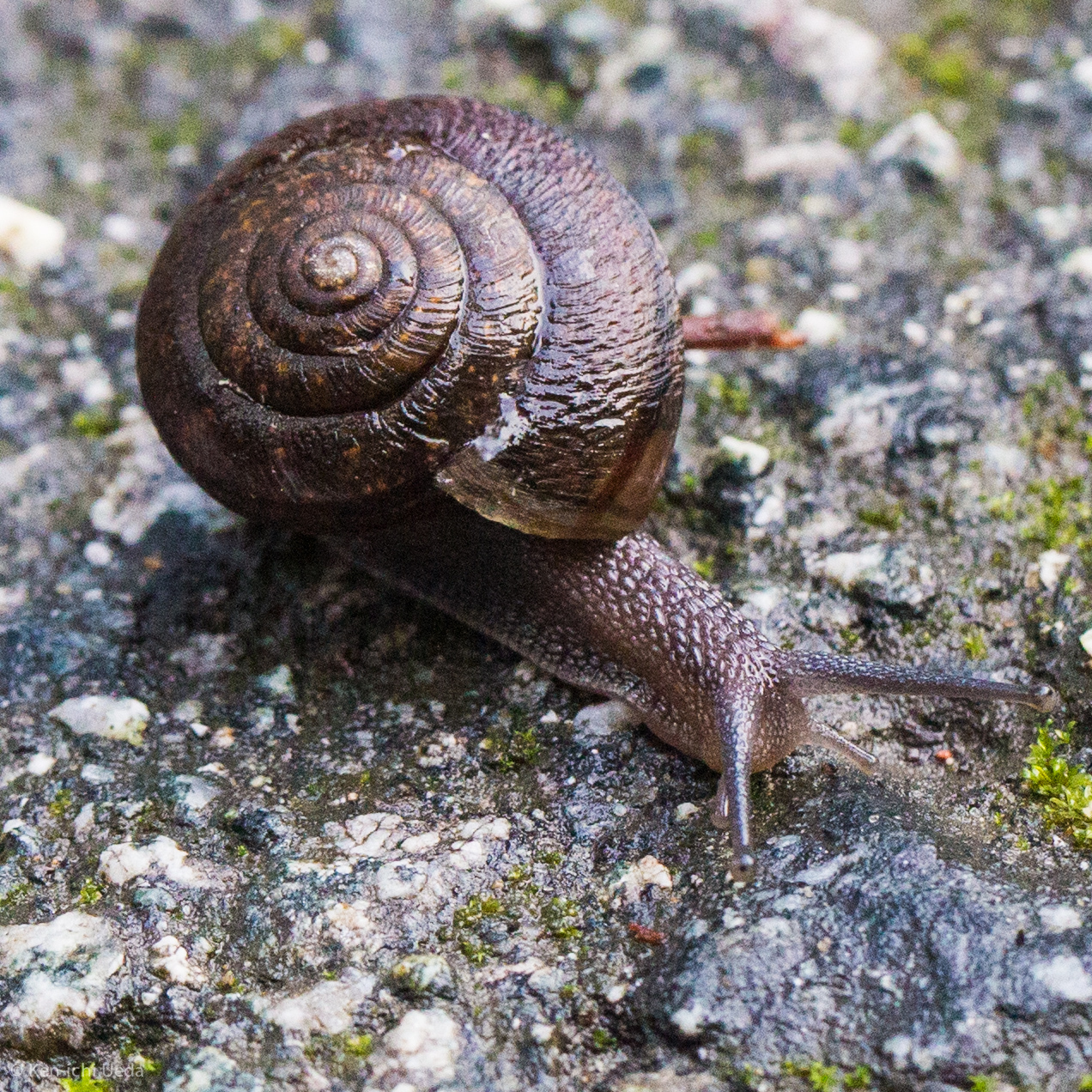

Conservation status
- Imperiled (NatureServe)

Scientific classification
- Domain: Eukaryota
- Kingdom: Animalia
- Phylum: Mollusca
- Class: Gastropoda
- Order: Stylommatophora
- Family: Xanthonychidae
- Genus: Helminthoglypta
- Species: H. arrosa

Binomial name
- Helminthoglypta arrosa (W. G. Binney, 1858)

Synonyms
- Helix arrosa

= Helminthoglypta arrosa =

Species of land snail

Helminthoglypta arrosa, also known as the bronze shoulderband snail, is a North American species of air-breathing land snail. It is found in northern and central California, and is endemic to the state.

== Subspecies ==
Recognized subspecies include:

- Helminthoglypta arrosa arrosa (W. G. Binney, 1858)
- Helminthoglypta arrosa humboldtica S. S. Berry, 1938
- Helminthoglypta arrosa marinensis Pilsbry, 1926
- Helminthoglypta arrosa monticola B. Roth, 1982
- Helminthoglypta arrosa pomoensis A. G. Smith, 1938

Synonyms

- Helminthoglypta arrosa mailliardi Pilsbry, 1926: synonym of Helminthoglypta mailliardi Pilsbry, 1926 (original rank)
- Helminthoglypta arrosa mattolensis A. G. Smith, 1938: synonym of Helminthoglypta expansilabris mattolensis A. G. Smith, 1938
- Helminthoglypta arrosa williamsi A. G. Smith, 1938: synonym of Helminthoglypta stiversiana williamsi A. G. Smith, 1938
