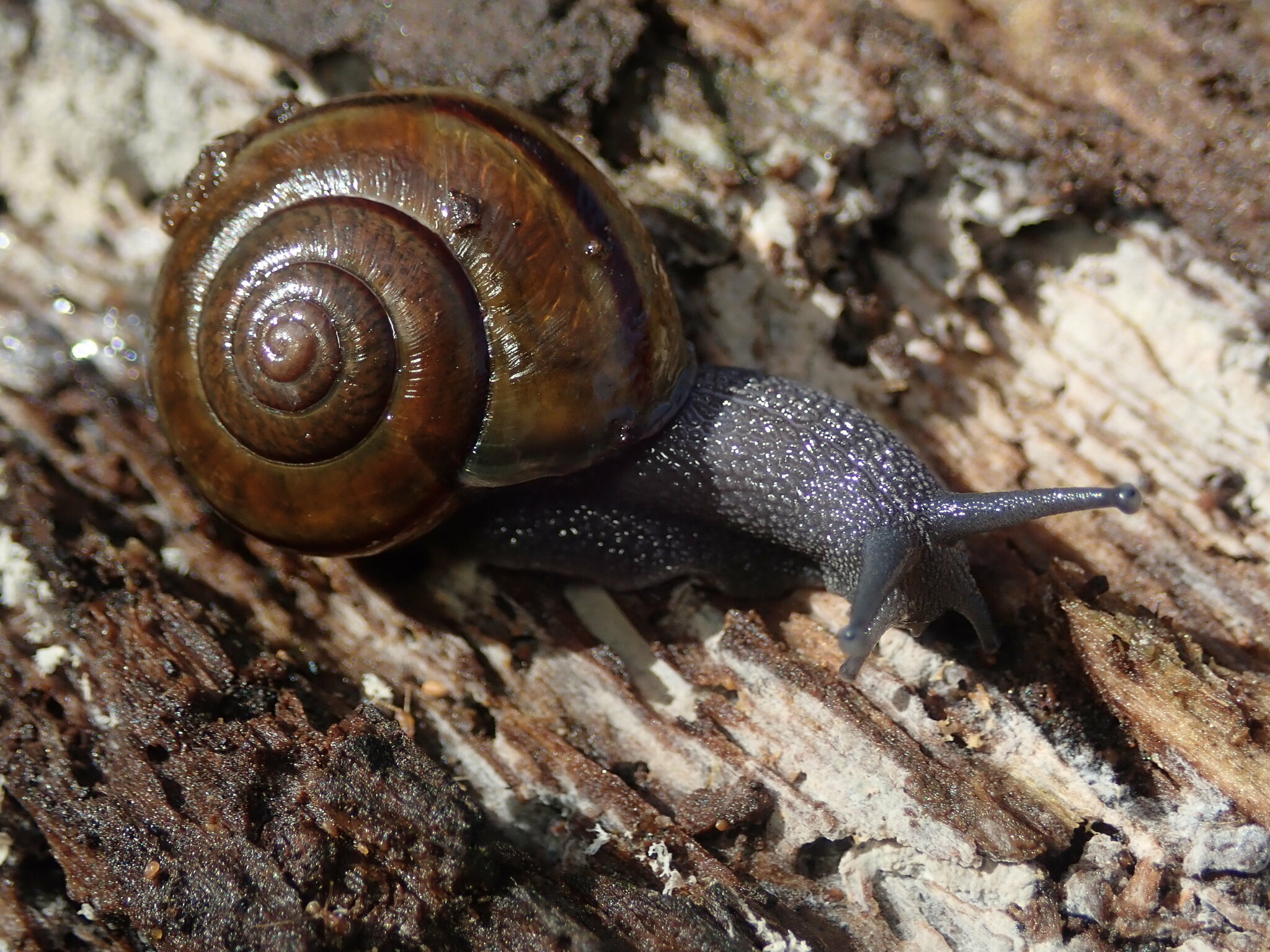

Conservation status
- Imperiled (NatureServe)

Scientific classification
- Kingdom: Animalia
- Phylum: Mollusca
- Class: Gastropoda
- Order: Stylommatophora
- Family: Xanthonychidae
- Genus: Helminthoglypta
- Species: H. tudiculata

Binomial name
- Helminthoglypta tudiculata (I. Lea, 1838)

= Helminthoglypta tudiculata =

Species of gastropod

Helminthoglypta tudiculata, common names the southern California shoulderband or southern shoulderband, is a species of air-breathing land snail, a terrestrial pulmonate gastropod mollusk in the family Helminthoglyptidae.

This snail is endemic to the United States.

== Anatomy ==
This species creates and uses love darts as part of its mating behavior.
