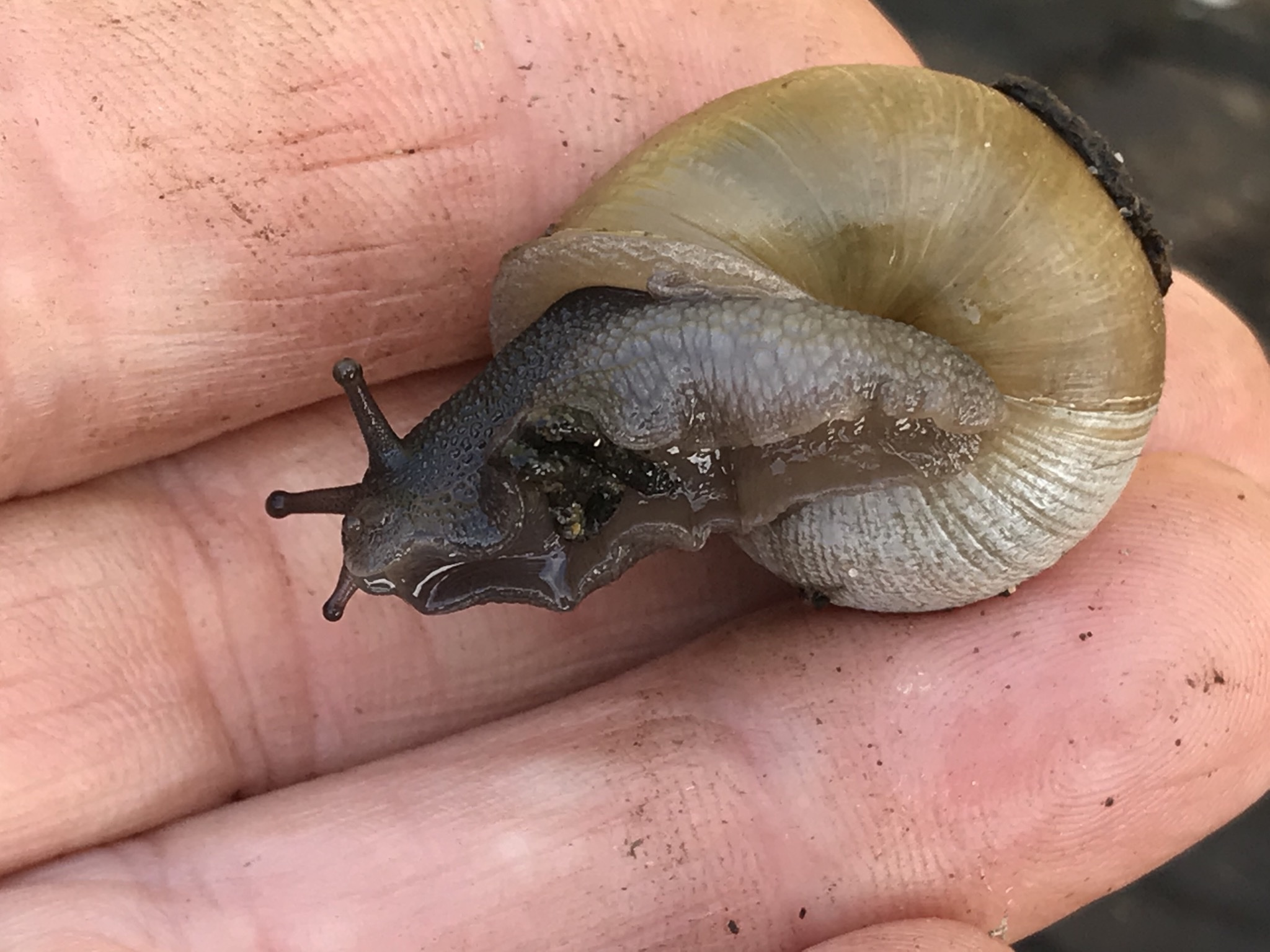

Conservation status
- Critically Imperiled (NatureServe)

Scientific classification
- Kingdom: Animalia
- Phylum: Mollusca
- Class: Gastropoda
- Order: Stylommatophora
- Family: Xanthonychidae
- Genus: Helminthoglypta
- Species: H. stiversiana

Binomial name
- Helminthoglypta stiversiana (J. G. Cooper, 1875)

= Helminthoglypta stiversiana =

Species of land snail

Helminthoglypta stiversiana, the Point Reyes shoulderband, is a species of land snail within the family Xanthonychidae. H. stiversiana has an orange-brown colored shell with a reddish-brown line running through, with the body typically being a dark gray color. Shells of dead individuals can be found white, but can retain the line in them. This species has not been comprehensively documented in scientific literature, most information can be inferred from other species in its genus. It is endemic to California. Its range is found in coastal regions of Mendocino, Sonoma, and Marin County. It is especially present in and around Point Reyes National Seashore and Sonoma Coast State Park. Habitat specifications for this species are likely tied to moisture levels, shelter, and calcium sources for shell development, with other species in its genus being assossiated with rocky outcrops, chaparral, or woodland environments as habitats. Activity levels are also likely based on moisture availability, rising with cooler humid periods and decreasing with dryer conditions. This species ecology is that of being a detritivore, feeding on decaying plant, fungi, and other pieces of organic matter in the soil. Predation likely occurs from carnivorous birds, reptiles, mammals, and arthropods that feed on snails as a food source. Reproduction has not been documented well, but its genus is known to mate and lay eggs during rainy seasons. For NatureServe, this species has received a global ranking of G1 in 2005, likely due to its limited distribution and susceptibility to threats such as habitat loss, fragmentation, and degradation from human activities. Climate change is also a potential risk to alterations in its environments precipitation and temperature that affects moisture-dependent habitats required by land snails. Despite this, this species has not received federal protection under the Endangered Species Act.

== Subspecies ==
Helminthoglypta stiversiana contains 3 subspecies. H. s. miwoka has the common name dented peninsula snail. H. s. williamsi has the common name Williams' bronze shoulderband. Both are assessed as T1 by NatureServe.

- Helminthoglypta stiversiana miwoka (Bartsch, 1919) (present in Point Reyes National Seashore)
- Helminthoglypta stiversiana stiversiana (J. G. Cooper, 1875)
- Helminthoglypta stiversiana williamsi A. G. Smith, 1938
