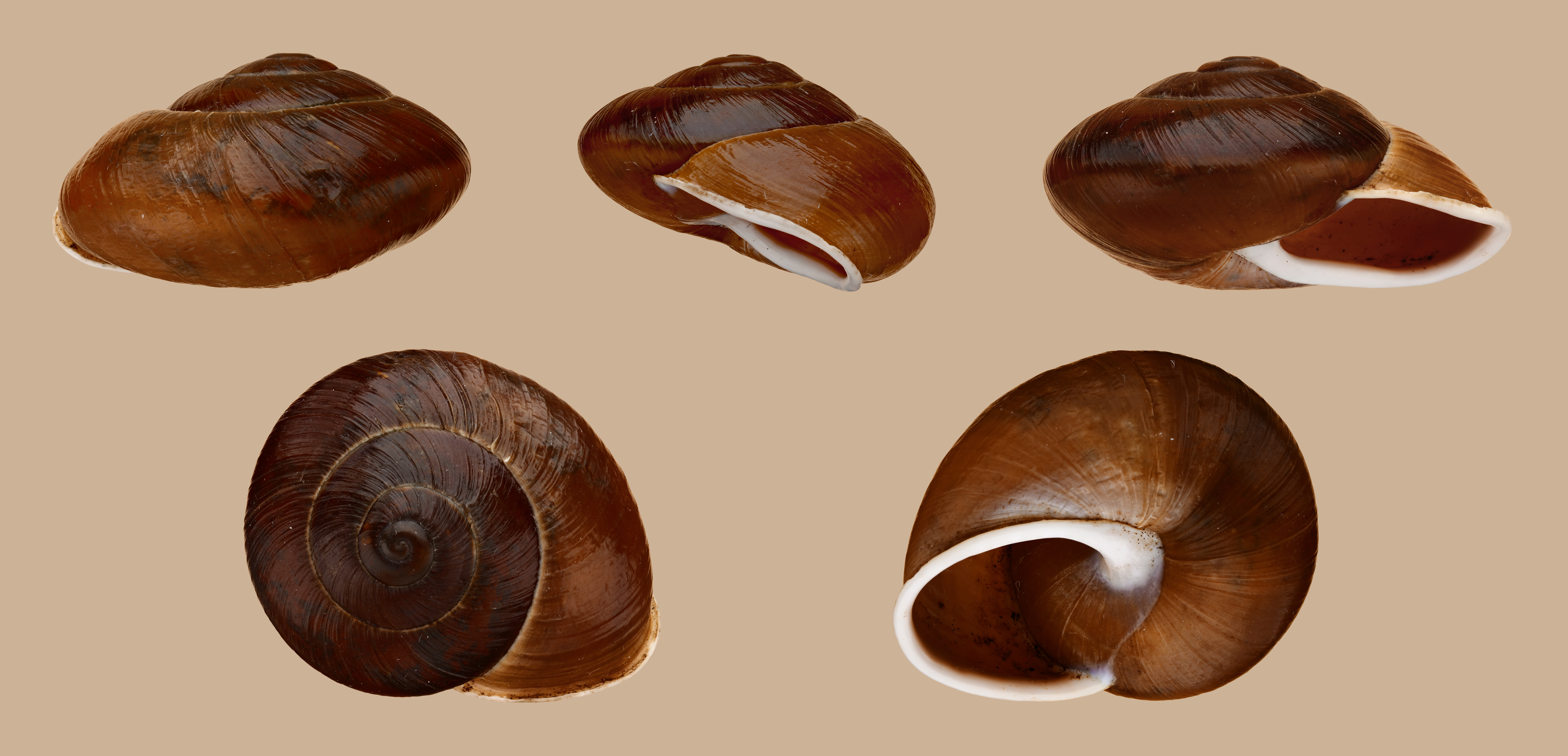
- Different views of a shell of E. clausomphalos

Scientific classification
- Kingdom: Animalia
- Phylum: Mollusca
- Class: Gastropoda
- Order: Stylommatophora
- Family: Xanthonychidae
- Genus: Epiphragmophora
- Species: E. clausomphalos

Binomial name
- Epiphragmophora clausomphalos (Deville & Hupe, 1850)

Synonyms
- Helix cuyana Strobel in Pfeiffer, 1867; Helix tschudiana Philippi, 1867

= Epiphragmophora clausomphalos =

Species of gastropod

Epiphragmophora clausomphalos is a species of air-breathing land snail, a terrestrial pulmonate gastropod mollusk in the family Epiphragmophoridae. It occurs in Peru.
