= Thousand Palms desert snail =

Conservation status
- Vulnerable (IUCN 2.3)

- Critically Imperiled (NatureServe)

Scientific classification
- Kingdom: Animalia
- Phylum: Mollusca
- Class: Gastropoda
- Order: Stylommatophora
- Family: Xanthonychidae
- Genus: Eremarionta
- Species: E. millepalmarum

Binomial name
- Eremarionta millepalmarum (S.S. Berry, 1930)

Species of gastropod

The Thousand Palms desert snail (Eremarionta millepalmarum) is a species of land snail in the family Helminthoglyptidae. This species is endemic to the United States. The specific epithet references Thousand Palms, California in the Colorado Desert.
