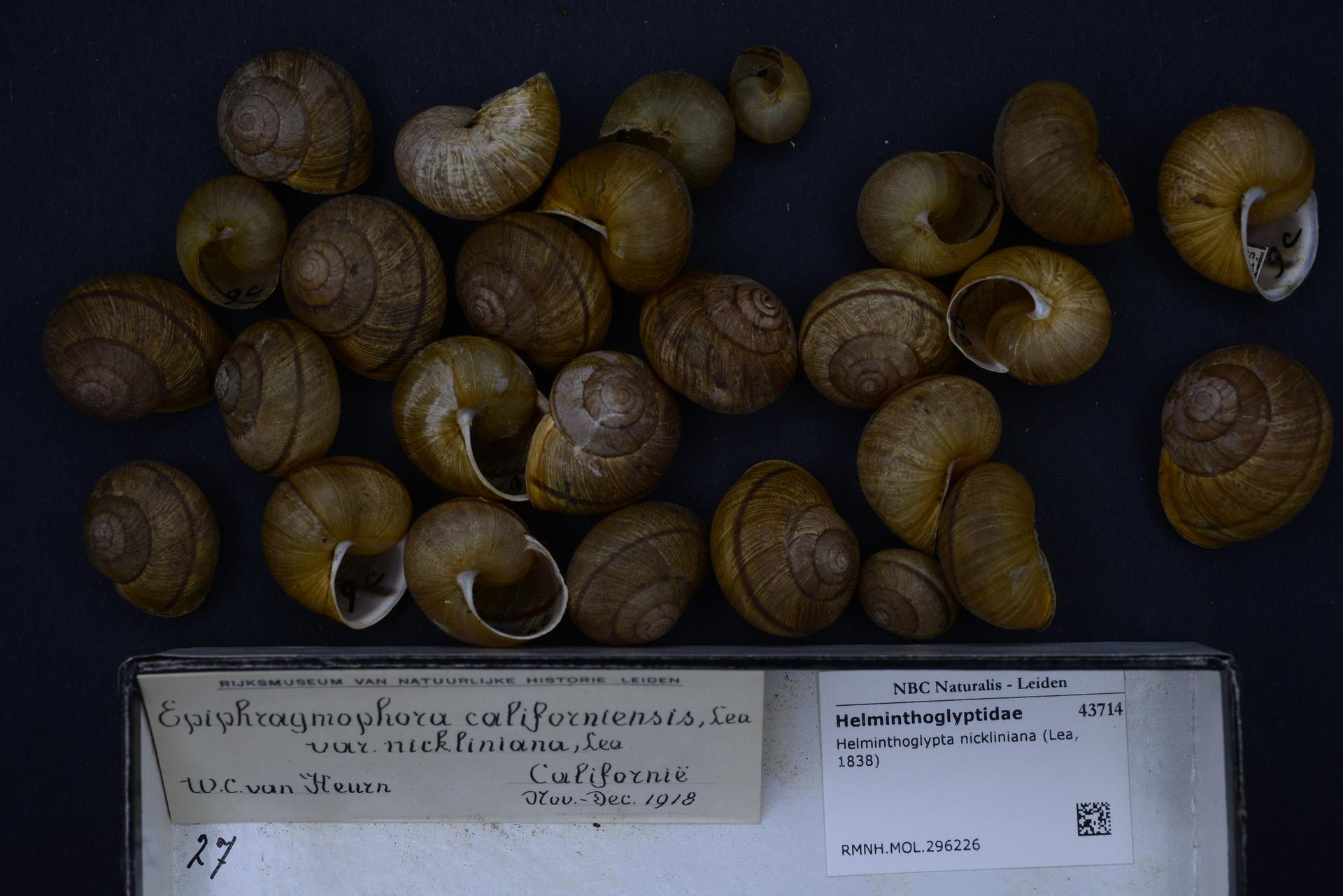

Conservation status
- Vulnerable (NatureServe)

Scientific classification
- Kingdom: Animalia
- Phylum: Mollusca
- Class: Gastropoda
- Order: Stylommatophora
- Family: Xanthonychidae
- Genus: Helminthoglypta
- Species: H. nickliniana

Binomial name
- Helminthoglypta nickliniana (I. Lea, 1838)
- Helminthoglypta nickliniana natural range, estimated with the iNaturalist Geomodel, 2025

= Helminthoglypta nickliniana =

Species of gastropod

Helminthoglypta nickliniana, common name Coast Range shoulderband snail or Nicklin's shoulderband snail is a species of air-breathing land snail, a terrestrial pulmonate gastropod mollusk in the family Helminthoglyptidae.

This snail is endemic to California, where it is found in Northern California and Central California.

== Behavior ==
This species creates and uses love darts as part of its mating behavior.

== Subspecies ==
Helminthoglypta nickliniana includes five subspecies:

- Helminthoglypta nickliniana anachoreta (W. G. Binney, 1858)
- Helminthoglypta nickliniana awania (Bartsch, 1919)
- Helminthoglypta nickliniana bridgesii (Newcomb, 1861)
- Helminthoglypta nickliniana nickliniana (I. Lea, 1838)
- Helminthoglypta nickliniana ramentosa (A. Gould, 1856)
