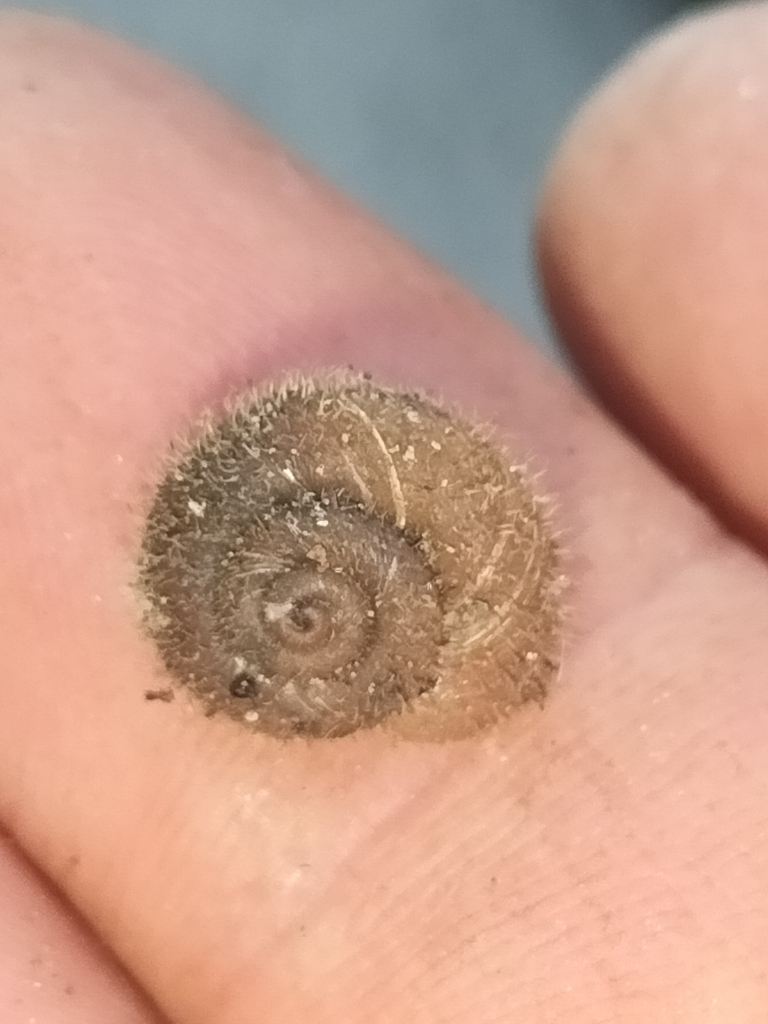
- Tolgachloritis cambelli

Scientific classification
- Kingdom: Animalia
- Phylum: Mollusca
- Class: Gastropoda
- Order: Stylommatophora
- Infraorder: Helicoidei
- Superfamily: Helicoidea
- Family: Camaenidae
- Genus: Tolgachloritis; Iredale, 1933

= Tolgachloritis =

Genus of gastropods

Tolgachloritis is a genus of air-breathing land snails, terrestrial pulmonate gastropod molluscs in the family Camaenidae. The genus was first described in 1933 by Tom Iredale, and the type species is Chloritis jacksoni Hedley, 1912. Iredale described them as "hairy".

The genus is restricted to Queensland (Australia).

== Species ==
(as listed by WoRMS, at 2024-04-07)

- Tolgachloritis campbelli (Iredale, 1938)
- Tolgachloritis costata J. Stanisic, 2010
- Tolgachloritis jacksoni (Hedley, 1912)
- Tolgachloritis kondaparinga J. Stanisic, 2010
