= Helminthoglypta allynsmithi =

Conservation status
- Vulnerable (IUCN 2.3)

- Critically Imperiled (NatureServe)

Scientific classification
- Kingdom: Animalia
- Phylum: Mollusca
- Class: Gastropoda
- Order: Stylommatophora
- Family: Xanthonychidae
- Genus: Helminthoglypta
- Species: H. allynsmithi

Binomial name
- Helminthoglypta allynsmithi Pilsbry, 1939

Species of gastropod

Helminthoglypta allynsmithi, the Merced Canyon shoulderband or Allyn Smith's banded snail, is a species of air-breathing land snail, a terrestrial pulmonate gastropod mollusc in the family Helminthoglyptidae. This species is endemic to the United States.
