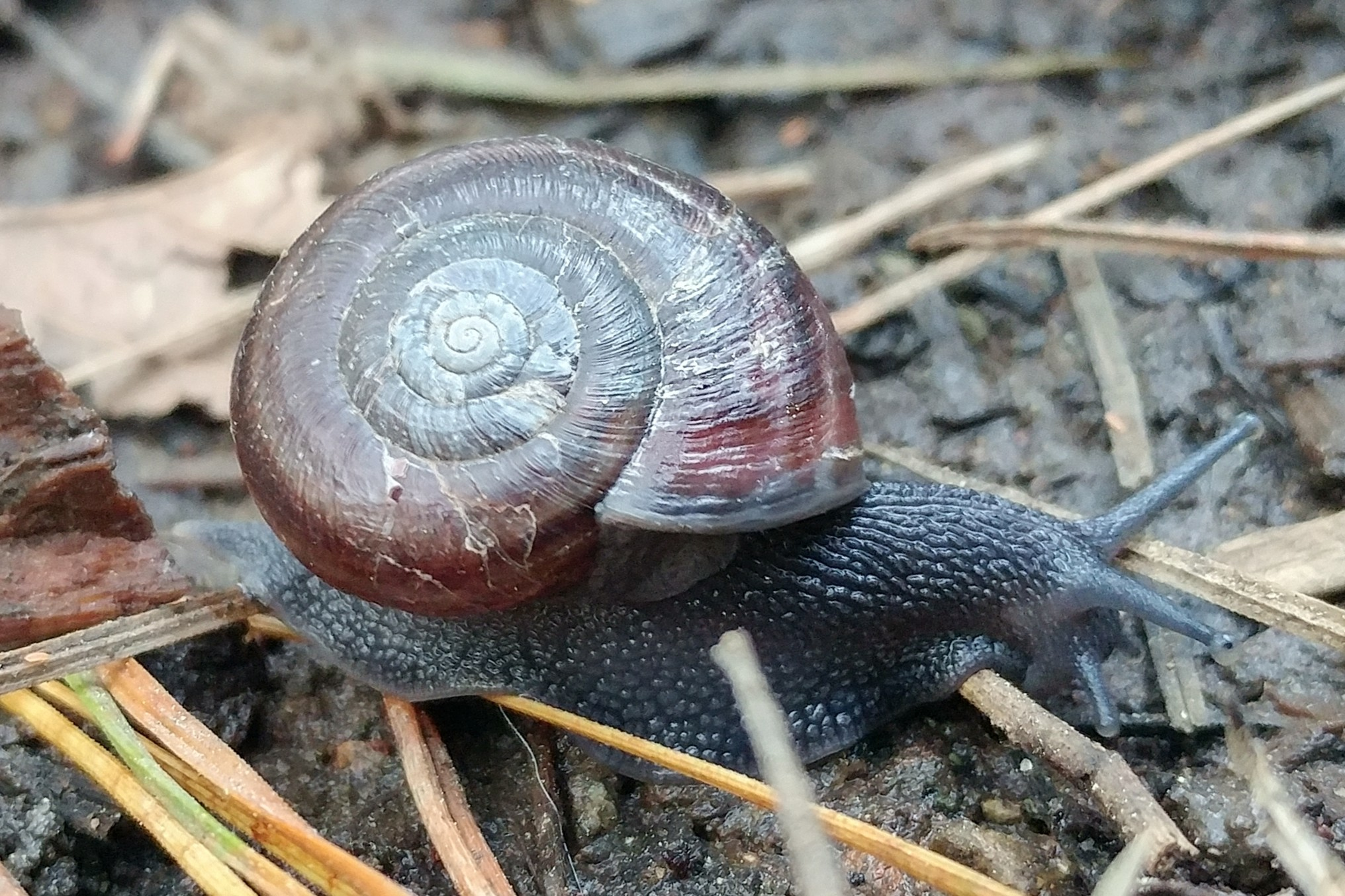

Conservation status
- Imperiled (NatureServe)

Scientific classification
- Kingdom: Animalia
- Phylum: Mollusca
- Class: Gastropoda
- Order: Stylommatophora
- Family: Xanthonychidae
- Genus: Helminthoglypta
- Species: H. sequoicola

Binomial name
- Helminthoglypta sequoicola (J. G. Cooper, 1866)

= Helminthoglypta sequoicola =

Species of gastropod

Helminthoglypta sequoicola, the redwood shoulderband snail, is a North American species of air-breathing land snail. Two subspecies are recognized:

- Helminthoglypta sequoicola consors (S.S. Berry, 1938)
  - Previously called Helminthoglypta dupetithouarsi consors
- Helminthoglypta sequoicola sequoicola (J. G. Cooper, 1866)
