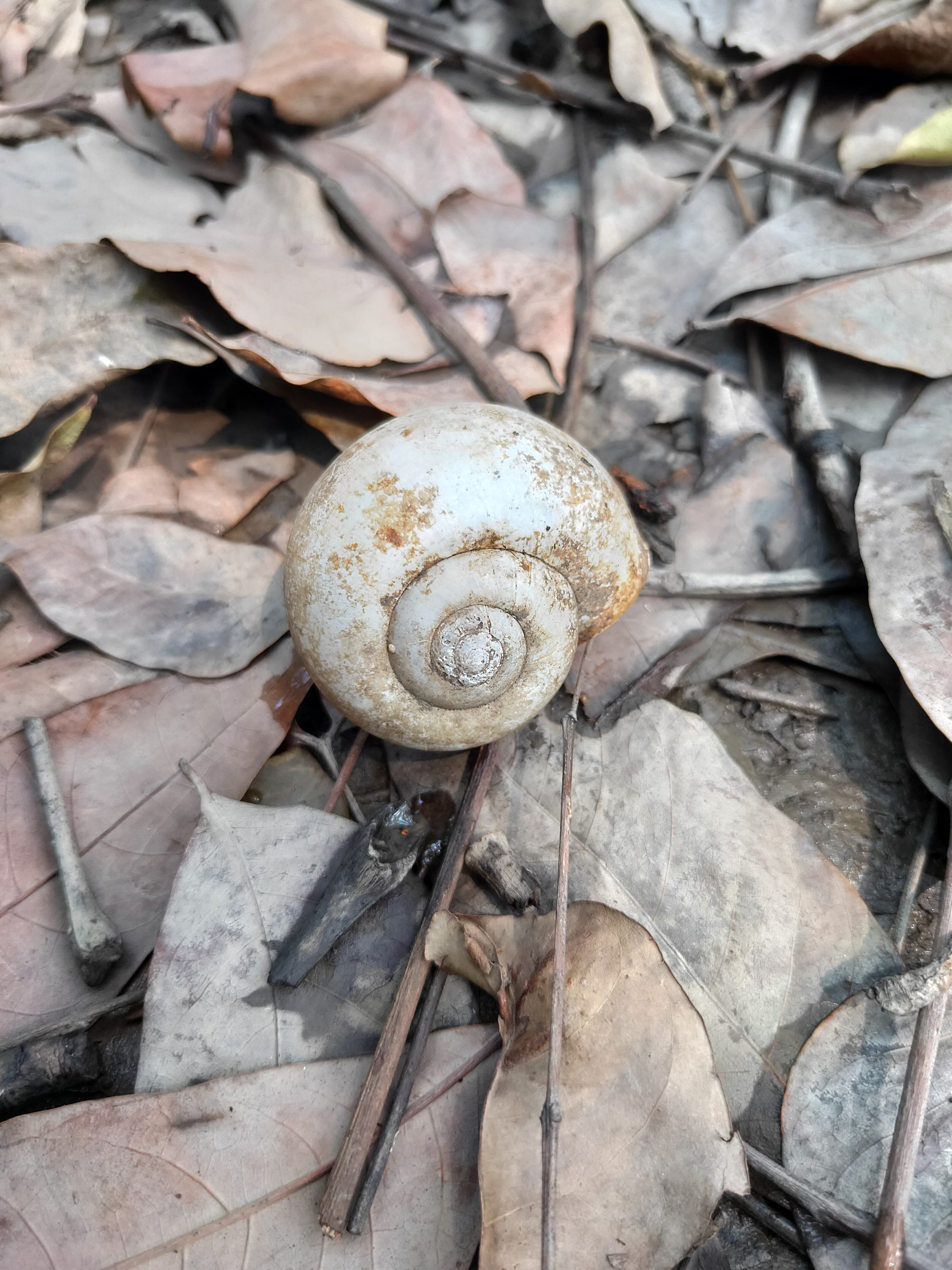

Conservation status
- Vulnerable (IUCN 2.3)

- Critically Imperiled (NatureServe)

Scientific classification
- Kingdom: Animalia
- Phylum: Mollusca
- Class: Gastropoda
- Order: Stylommatophora
- Family: Xanthonychidae
- Genus: Eremarionta
- Species: E. immaculata

Binomial name
- Eremarionta immaculata (Willett, 1937)

= White desert snail =

Species of gastropod

The white desert snail, scientific name Eremarionta immaculata, is a species of air-breathing land snail, a terrestrial pulmonate gastropod mollusc in the family Helminthoglyptidae. This species is endemic to the United States.
