= Eremarionta =

Scientific classification
- Kingdom: Animalia
- Phylum: Mollusca
- Class: Gastropoda
- Order: Stylommatophora
- Family: Xanthonychidae
- Subfamily: Helminthoglyptinae
- Genus: Eremarionta; Pilsbry, 1913

Genus of gastropods

Eremarionta is a genus of air-breathing land snails; terrestrial pulmonate gastropod mollusks in the tribe Helminthoglyptini of subfamily Helminthoglyptinae of the Xanthonychidae family. They are parapatric with several other genera within the tribe, which complicates distinguishing them without further analysis as shell morphology differences, especially at species level, are subtle. Knowledge of their shell and body characteristics coupled with geographic distribution facilitates identification.

== Species ==
Species within the genus Eremarionta include:

- White desert snail (Eremarionta immaculata) (Willett, 1937)
- Thousand Palms desert snail (Eremarionta millepalmarum) (S. S. Berry, 1930)
- Morongo desert snail (Eremarionta morongoana) (S. S. Berry, 1929)
- Eastern desert snail (Eremarionta rowelli) (Newcomb, 1865)
- Argus desert snail (Eremarionta argus) (Edson, 1912)
- Orocopia desert snail (Eremarionta orocopia) (Willett, 1939)
- Eremarionta brunnea (Willett, 1935)
- Eremarionta ellipsostoma (Pilsbry, 1894)
- Eremarionta newcombi (Pilsbry & Ferriss, 1923)
- Eremarionta ultima (Pilsbry, 1916)
