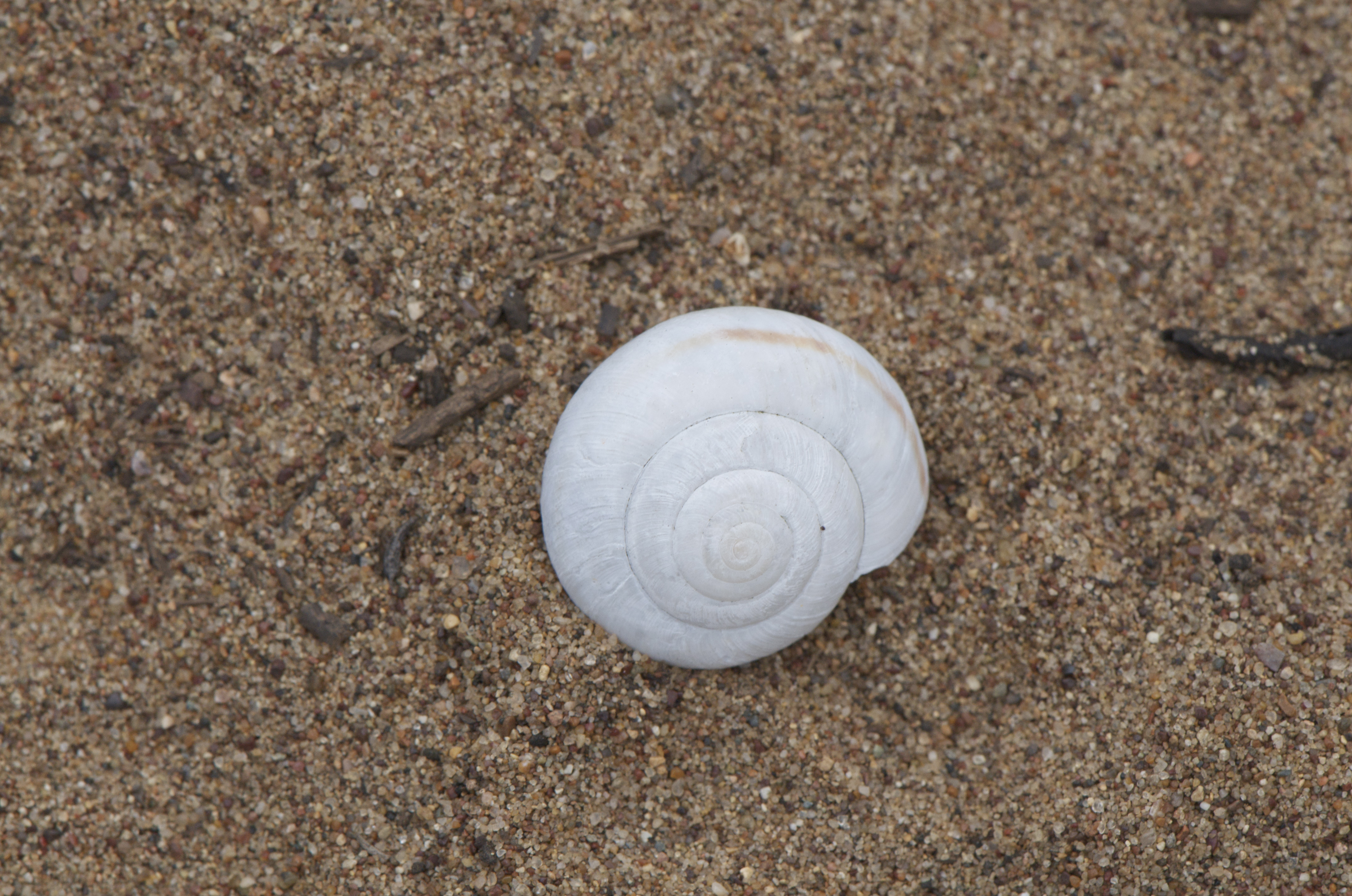

Conservation status
- Critically Endangered (IUCN 2.3)

- Imperiled (NatureServe)

Scientific classification
- Kingdom: Animalia
- Phylum: Mollusca
- Class: Gastropoda
- Order: Stylommatophora
- Family: Xanthonychidae
- Genus: Helminthoglypta
- Species: H. walkeriana

Binomial name
- Helminthoglypta walkeriana (Hemphill, 1911)

Synonyms
- Helix walkeriana Hemphill, 1911

= Banded dune snail =

Species of gastropod

The banded dune snail or Morro shoulderband (Helminthoglypta walkeriana) is a species of endangered air-breathing land snail, a terrestrial pulmonate gastropod mollusc in the subfamily Helminthoglyptinae.

The name stems from the fact that the snails have distinctive spiral shells that are usually banded in different colors. The shells are typically mostly brown, however they can also be a variety of other colors.

== Taxonomy ==
At the time the species was divided into two subtaxa (subspecies or varieties): H. w. walkeriana and H. w. morroensis. The latter was thought to be extinct but was rediscovered. In 2004, it was elevated to species status as Helminthoglypta morroensis and it inherited the endangered status it had when it was part of Helminthoglypta walkeriana.

Both snails together were known as the banded dune snail. Today H. walkeriana proper is the Morro shoulderband, and H. morroensis is the Chorro shoulderband.

== Ecology ==
=== Distribution and habitat ===
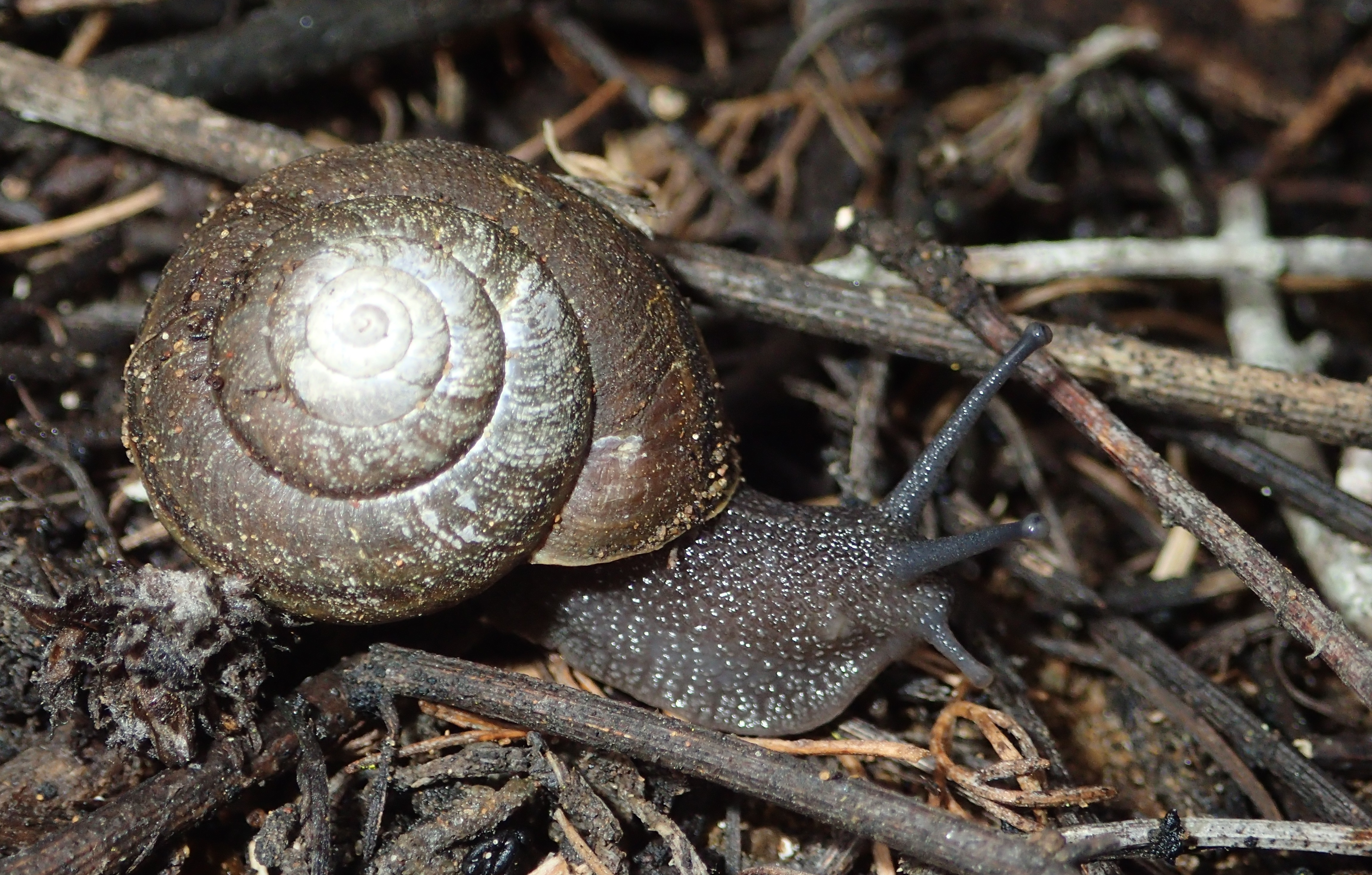
Banded dune snail seen in natural habitat

The species is endemic to the area around the cities of Morro Bay and Los Osos in the central coast in San Luis Obispo County and Santa Barbara County, in California. As coastal organisms, the Morro Shoulderband variant primarily occupies coastal dunes, coastal dune scrubs, and maritime chaparral plant communities that are mostly stabilized dune systems. They are most commonly found on sandy soils dominated by woody shrubs. On the other hand, the Chorro Shoulderband snail can also be found in grassland communities and rocky areas. It has also been found that there is a correlation between the Chorro Shoulderband's occurrence and clay and serpentine soils. Despite the slight variety in habitats, the total area of occurrence has been calculated to be as low as 40 km^{2} (15 sq mi). It is possible that only a few thousand individuals are living in the world now, mostly consisting of the Morro Shoulderband variety. However, the reproduction frequency of the snails allows them to maintain a population despite the variable conditions of the sandy habitats. The habitats are threatened not only by wind and water that can shift the sand dunes, but also by land conversion, off-road recreation, and the invasion of non-native plants.

=== Diet ===
Although no study specific to the banded dune snails diet has been performed, it can be assumed that they have similar diets to those of the Helminthoglypta in similar locations, which consists of dead and decaying plant material. Similarly to other snails, the banded dune snail uses its sense of smell to find food. Within the narrow distribution in coastal dune and scrub communities in western San Luis Obispo County, they typically expose themselves from underneath the sands during wet weather, meaning they are almost solely active during the wet seasons. They seal themselves inside of their shells for months during a drought, but reemerge when rains return.

=== Behavior ===
The rainy season is the morro shoulderband snail's most active season. After spending many months in prolonged aestivation, they emerge following the first rain of the season. Their activity is reserved to either find food, which they do through their sense of smell, or to reproduce. High humidity correlates with higher levels of activity. Once the weather becomes drier, their activity decreases and they prepare for aestivation. During aestivation, they find shelter in local plants for as long as 170 days. This season can lead to a 40 percent loss in body weight, but this can be regained during the first 24 hours after aestivation.

=== Life cycle ===
The life cycle of these snails is made up of two parts based on the dry and rainy weather of the Mediterranean climate regions of California. To survive drier seasons, they go through a period of prolonged dormancy, or aestivation. An epiphragm, a durable seal of dried mucus, is developed over the opening of its shell to protect itself from drying out. The epiphragm is then shed during the late fall and winter once rain begins. Most individual growth and reproduction occurs during the rainy season, when moisture conditions are ideal for feeding. They can mate several times in a single year.

=== Reproduction ===
The reproductive cycle of the banded dune snail can be compared to other related Helminthoglypta species. Similarly to those species, the snails are hermaphroditic, meaning that all have both male and female reproductive organs. They are typically sexually mature at around 3–4 years of age. Prior to mating, which occurs after the first significant downpours of the wet season, they often engage in courtship behaviors to attract partners, which may include the exchange of pheromones. They generally mate when it is darker on the surface, meaning during overcast days or during the night. After mating, the female parts of the snail fertilize the eggs, then they are laid in shallow holes in sandy soil covered by leaves to protect them from predators or other environmental threats. The eggs, normally laid in small clusters, hatch around six months later.

== Conservation ==
This snail was placed on the United States' Endangered Species List in 1994. The IUCN Red List considers the snail critically endangered, and NatureServe considers it imperiled.

The USFWS recommends that the Morro shoulderband be downlisted to threatened status and the Chorro shoulderband be delisted.
