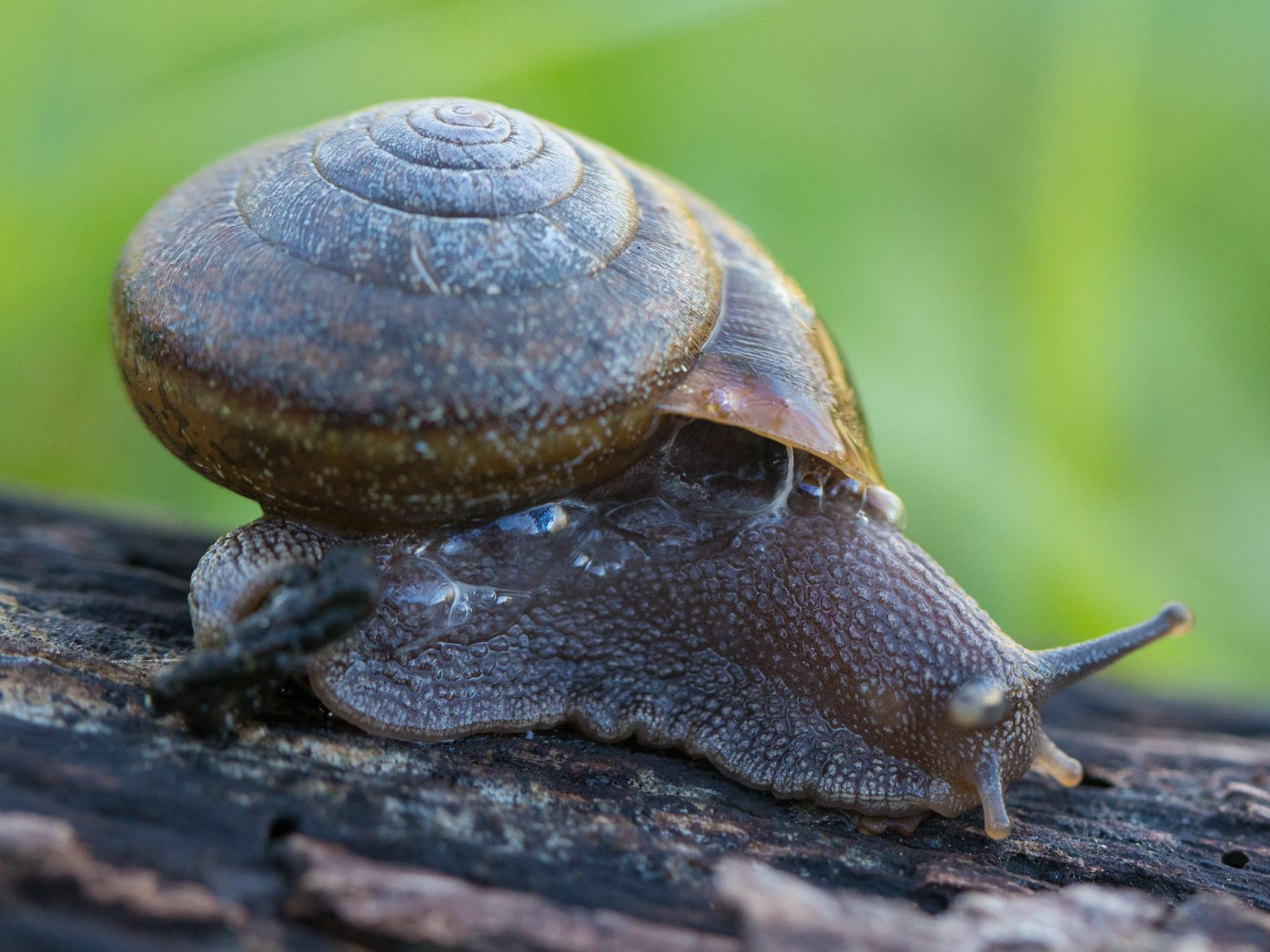

Conservation status
- Imperiled (NatureServe)

Scientific classification
- Kingdom: Animalia
- Phylum: Mollusca
- Class: Gastropoda
- Order: Stylommatophora
- Family: Xanthonychidae
- Subfamily: Helminthoglyptinae
- Genus: Helminthoglypta
- Species: H. diabloensis

Binomial name
- Helminthoglypta diabloensis (J. G. Cooper, 1869)

Synonyms
- Helix diabloensis J. G. Cooper, 1869

= Helminthoglypta diabloensis =

Species of gastropod

Helminthoglypta diabloensis, or the silky shoulderband snail, is a North American species of air-breathing land snail. It is found in California, including the California Coast Ranges, Diablo Range, and other areas in Alameda, Contra Costa, Santa Clara, Yolo, Colusa and Napa Counties. The shell of H. diabloensis is described as having six to seven tightly coiled whorls.

This snail was previously described as Helix diabloensis.
