= Kern shoulderband =

Conservation status
- Endangered (IUCN 2.3)

- Possibly Extinct (NatureServe)

Scientific classification
- Kingdom: Animalia
- Phylum: Mollusca
- Class: Gastropoda
- Order: Stylommatophora
- Family: Xanthonychidae
- Genus: Helminthoglypta
- Species: H. callistoderma

Binomial name
- Helminthoglypta callistoderma Pilsbry, 1917

Species of gastropod

The Kern shoulderband, scientific name Helminthoglypta callistoderma, is a species of air-breathing land snail, a terrestrial pulmonate gastropod mollusk in the family Helminthoglyptidae. This species is endemic to the United States.
