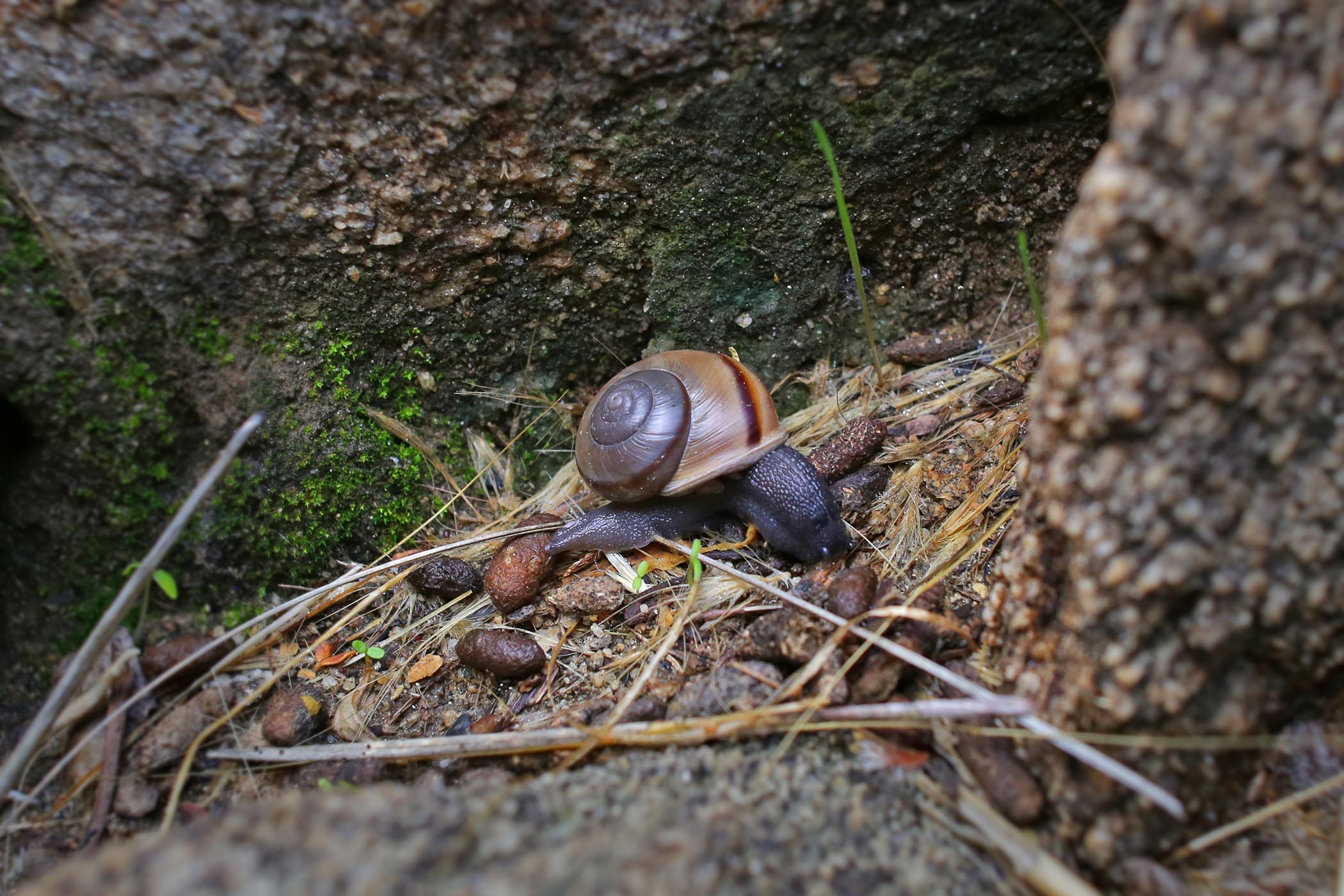
- In Chino Canyon

Conservation status
- Near Threatened (IUCN 2.3)

- Imperiled (NatureServe)

Scientific classification
- Kingdom: Animalia
- Phylum: Mollusca
- Class: Gastropoda
- Order: Stylommatophora
- Family: Xanthonychidae
- Genus: Eremarionta
- Species: E. morongoana

Binomial name
- Eremarionta morongoana (S.S. Berry, 1929)

= Morongo desert snail =

Species of gastropod

The Morongo desert snail (Eremarionta morongoana) is a species of land snail in the family Helminthoglyptidae.

It is endemic to California in the western United States.

It is known only from the Morongo Basin area of the Colorado Desert−Mojave Desert ecotone, in Riverside County and San Bernardino County.
