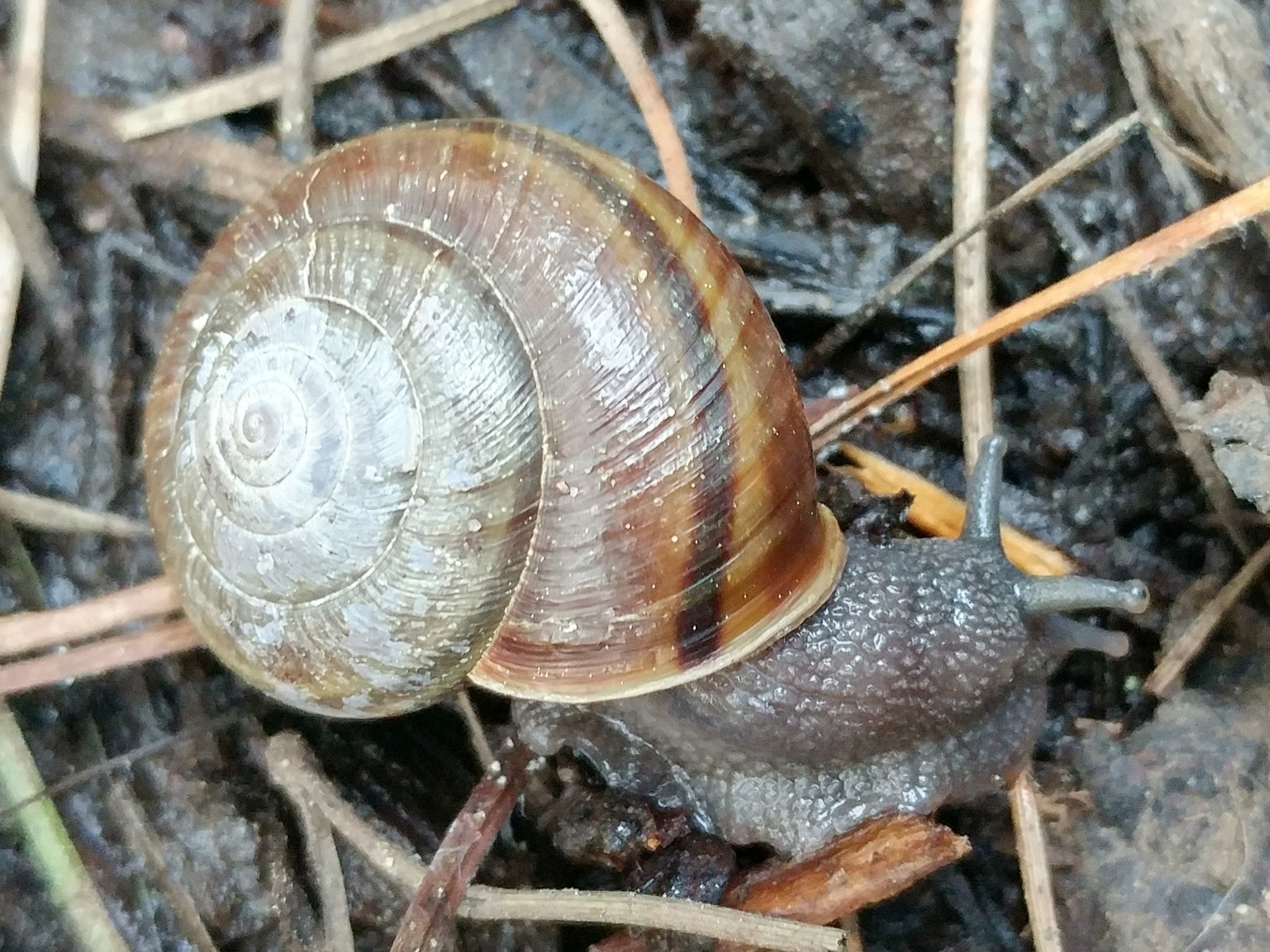

Conservation status
- Imperiled (NatureServe)

Scientific classification
- Kingdom: Animalia
- Phylum: Mollusca
- Class: Gastropoda
- Order: Stylommatophora
- Family: Xanthonychidae
- Genus: Helminthoglypta
- Species: H. umbilicata

Binomial name
- Helminthoglypta umbilicata (Pilsbry, 1898)

= Helminthoglypta umbilicata =

Species of land snail

Helminthoglypta umbilicata, or the Big Sur shoulderband snail, is a North American species of air-breathing land snail. It is found in California, from Monterey Bay to Morro Bay. The shell has an open umbilicus and is about 27 millimetres (1.1 in) in diameter. It uses reusable love darts in mating.

== Synonyms ==
Synonyms include:

- Epiphragmophora tudiculata var. umbilicata Pilsbry, 1898 (original rank)
- Epiphragmophora dupetithouarsi cuestana Edson, 1912
- Helix dupetithouarsi var. concursus Pilsbry, 1924
- Helminthoglypta umbilicata cayucosensis Pilsbry, 1925
- Helminthoglypta umbilicata lioderma Pilsbry, 1939
