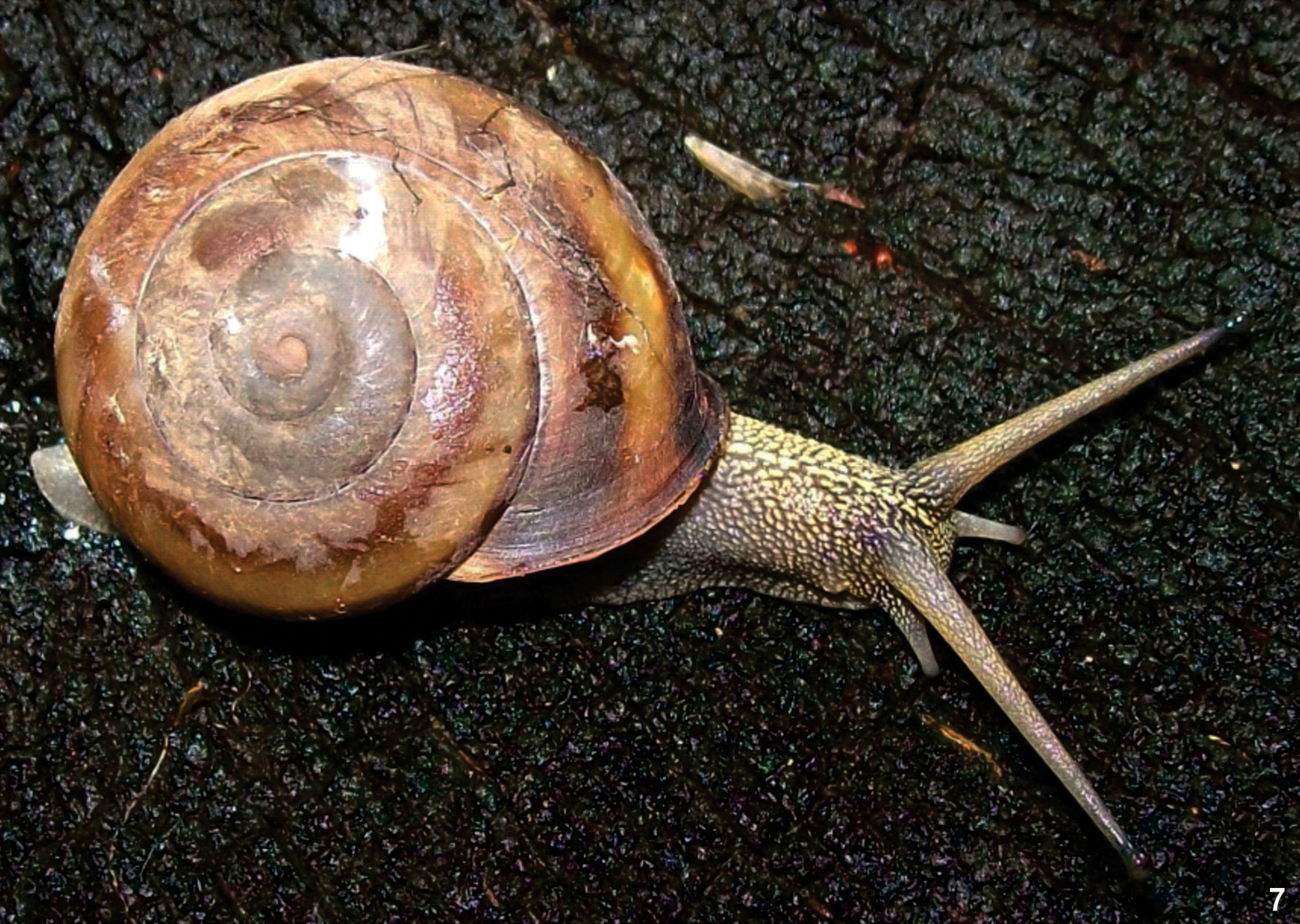
- A live specimen of Minaselates paradoxa

Scientific classification
- Kingdom: Animalia
- Phylum: Mollusca
- Class: Gastropoda
- Order: Stylommatophora
- Family: Xanthonychidae
- Subfamily: Epiphragmophorinae
- Genus: Minaselates; Cuezzo & Pena, 2017
- Species: M. paradoxa

Binomial name
- Minaselates paradoxa Cuezzo & Pena, 2017

= Minaselates =

Species of gastropod

Minaselates paradoxa is a species of air-breathing land snail, a terrestrial pulmonate gastropod mollusc in the subfamily Epiphragmophorinae.

It is the sole representative of the monospecific genus Minaselates, described from the Cavernas do Peruaçu National Park in southeastern Brazil.

== Taxonomy and phylogeny ==
Minaselates is a monospecific genus erected to harbor Minaselates paradoxa, and one of the seven genera currently included in the family Epiphragmophoridae. It is apparently closely related to the genus Epiphragmophora, but its shell can be distinguished by the protoconch sculpture, outline of the apex, complex teleoconch microsculpture and closed umbilicus fused with the shell wall. Regarding the soft parts, the presence of a long and thin kidney that extends more than half the length of the pulmonary cavity, as well as a flagellar caecum and a smooth jaw also distinguish Minaselates from Epiphragmophora.
