= Mesa shoulderband =

Conservation status
- Vulnerable (IUCN 2.3)

Scientific classification
- Kingdom: Animalia
- Phylum: Mollusca
- Class: Gastropoda
- Order: Stylommatophora
- Family: Xanthonychidae
- Genus: Helminthoglypta
- Species: H. coelata

Binomial name
- Helminthoglypta coelata (Bartsch, 1916)

Species of gastropod

The mesa shoulderband, scientific name Helminthoglypta coelata, is a species of air-breathing land snail, a terrestrial pulmonate gastropod mollusk in the family Helminthoglyptidae. This species is endemic to the United States and Baja California del Norte, Mexico.
