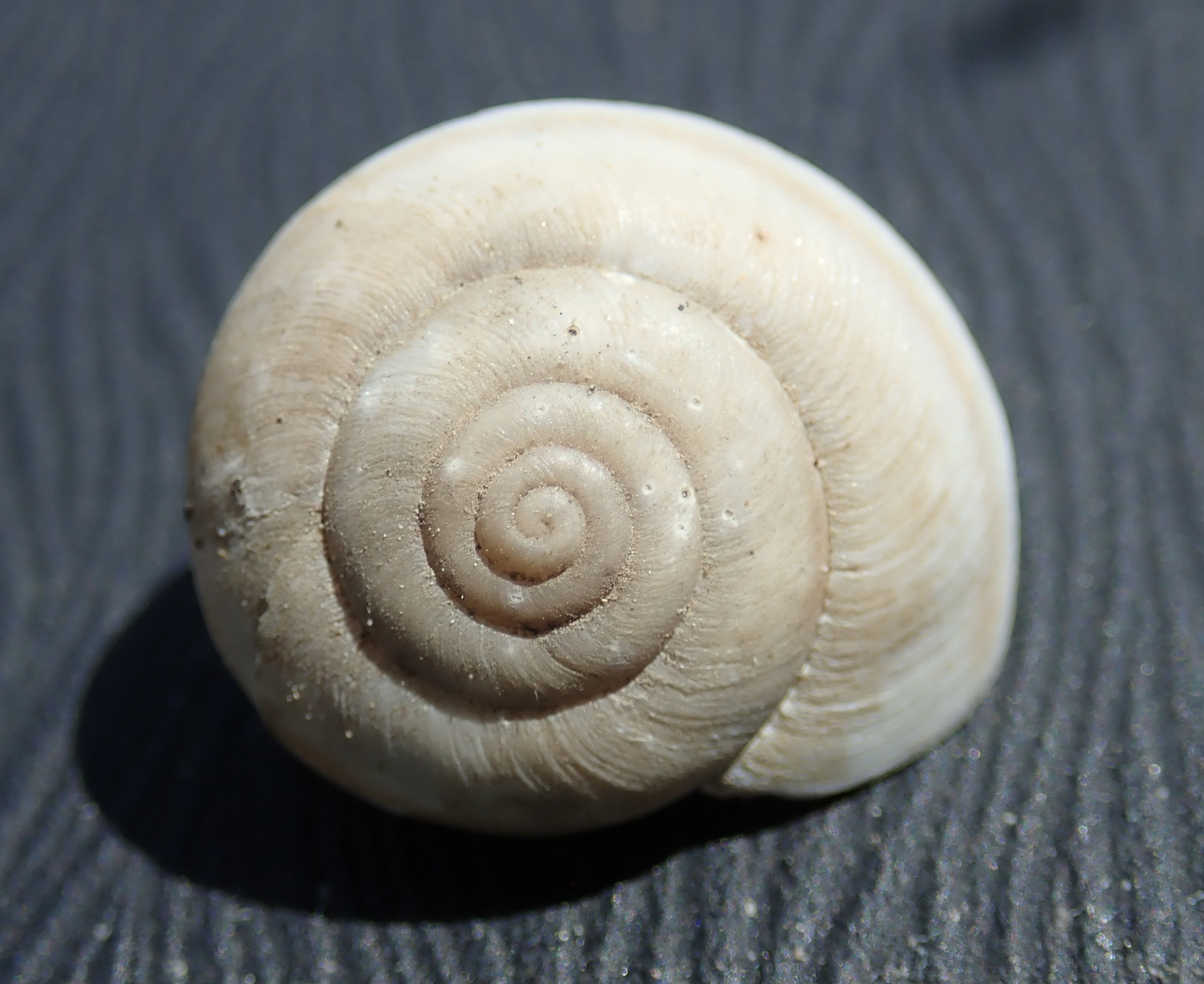

Conservation status
- Near Threatened (IUCN 2.3)

- Critically Imperiled (NatureServe)

Scientific classification
- Kingdom: Animalia
- Phylum: Mollusca
- Class: Gastropoda
- Order: Stylommatophora
- Family: Xanthonychidae
- Genus: Helminthoglypta
- Species: H. mohaveana

Binomial name
- Helminthoglypta mohaveana S.S. Berry, 1927

= Victorville shoulderband =

Species of gastropod

The Victorville shoulderband (Helminthoglypta mohaveana) is a species of land snail in the family Helminthoglyptidae.

It is endemic to California in the Western United States.

It is known only from the Mojave Desert near Victorville in San Bernardino County.
