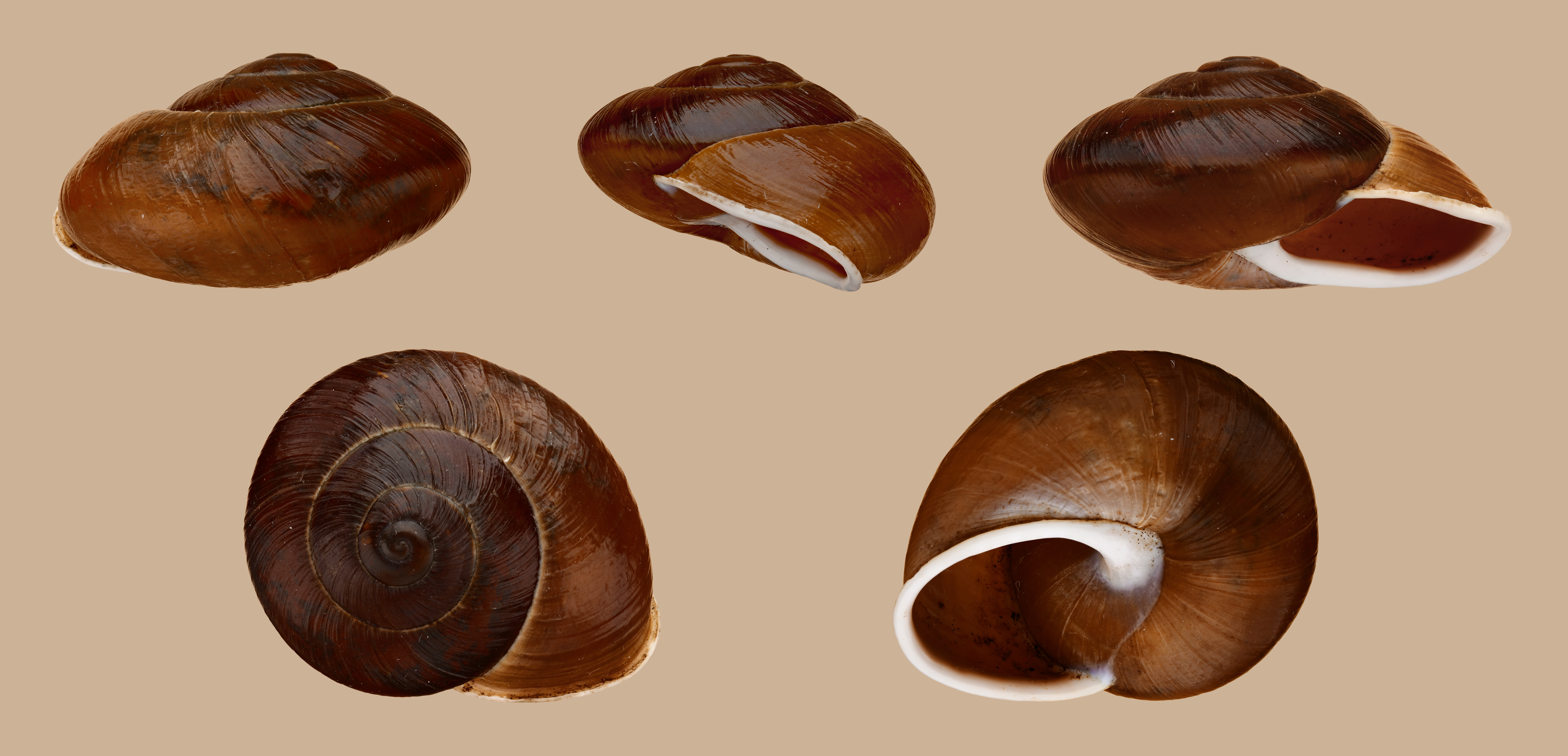
- Different views of a shell of Epiphragmophora clausomphalos

Scientific classification
- Kingdom: Animalia
- Phylum: Mollusca
- Class: Gastropoda
- Order: Stylommatophora
- Superfamily: Helicoidea
- Family: Xanthonychidae
- Subfamily: Epiphragmophorinae
- Genus: Epiphragmophora; Doering, 1874

Synonyms
- Epiphragmophora (Angrandiella) Ancey, 1886· accepted, alternate representation; Epiphragmophora (Doeringina) Ihering, 1929· accepted, alternate representation; Epiphragmophora (Epiphragmophora) Doering, 1875· accepted, alternate representation; Epiphragmophora (Karlschmidtia) F. Haas, 1955· accepted, alternate representation; Helix (Epiphragmophora) Doering, 1875; Helix (Poecilostola) Ancey, 1886; Karlschmidtia Haas, 1955

= Epiphragmophora =

Genus of gastropods

Epiphragmophora is a genus of air-breathing land snails, terrestrial pulmonate gastropod mollusks in the subfamily Epiphragmophorinae.

It occurs exclusively in South America, and is distributed in Peru, Bolivia, Paraguay and Argentina, with isolated occurrences in southern Colombia and southern Brazil. This genus is known to be a typical component of the Andean fauna, although it inhabits elevated cloud rainforest areas and flatlands in Argentina and Bolivia.

== Species ==
Species in the genus Epiphragmophora include:

- Epiphragmophora alsophila (Philippi, 1867)
- Epiphragmophora angrandi (Morelet, 1863)
- Epiphragmophora argentina (Holmberg, 1909)
- Epiphragmophora atahualpa Pilsbry, 1944
- Epiphragmophora audouini (d’Orbigny, 1835)
- Epiphragmophora basiplanata Weyrauch, 1960
- Epiphragmophora birabeni Parodiz, 1955
- Epiphragmophora cerrateae Weyrauch, 1960
- Epiphragmophora costellata Fernández & Rumi, 1974
- Epiphragmophora cryptomphala Ancey, 1897
- Epiphragmophora clausomphalos (Deville & Hupe, 1850)
- Epiphragmophora escoipensis Cuezzo, 1996
- Epiphragmophora estella (d’Orbigny, 1835)
- Epiphragmophora farrisi (Pfeiffer, 1859)
- Epiphragmophora granulosa Weyrauch, 1960
- Epiphragmophora gueinzii (Pfeiffer, 1856)
- Epiphragmophora guevarai Cuezzo, 2006
- Epiphragmophora haasi Zilch, 1953
- Epiphragmophora hemiclausa Hylton Scott, 1951
- Epiphragmophora hemiophalus Haas, 1951
- Epiphragmophora hieronymi Doering, 1874
- Epiphragmophora higginsi (Miller, 1878)
- Epiphragmophora huancabambensis (Pilsbry, 1926)
- Epiphragmophora huanucensis (Philippi, 1867)
- Epiphragmophora jaspidea (Pfeiffer, 1859)
- Epiphragmophora jujuyensis Hylton Scott, 1962
- Epiphragmophora lentiformis (Haas, 1955)
- Epiphragmophora leucobasis Haas, 1951
- Epiphragmophora llaguenica Zilch, 1953
- Epiphragmophora macasi (Higgins, 1872)
- Epiphragmophora mirabilis Weyrauch, 1960
- Epiphragmophora olssoni Pilsbry, 1926
- Epiphragmophora ormeai Weyrauch, 1956
- Epiphragmophora orophila Ancey, 1903
- Epiphragmophora oroyensis Pilsbry, 1926
- Epiphragmophora oresigena (d’Orbigny, 1835)
- Epiphragmophora parodizi Fernández & Rumi, 1984
- Epiphragmophora proseni Hylton Scott, 1951
- Epiphragmophora puella Hylton Scott, 1951
- Epiphragmophora puntana (Holmberg, 1909)
- Epiphragmophora quirogai Cuezzo, 2006
- Epiphragmophora rhathymos (Holmberg, 1912)
- Epiphragmophora saltana Ancey, 1897
- Epiphragmophora taulisensis Zilch, 1953
- Epiphragmophora tomsici Fernández & Rumi, 1984
- Epiphragmophora trenquelleonis (Grateloup, 1851)
- Epiphragmophora trifasciata Fernández & Rumi, 1984
- Epiphragmophora trigrammephora (d’Orbigny, 1835)
- Epiphragmophora tucumanensis (Doering, 1874)
- Epiphragmophora variegata Hylton Scott, 1962
- Epiphragmophora villavilensis Parodiz, 1955
- Epiphragmophora walshi Cuezzo, 2006
- Epiphragmophora webbi Pilsbry, 1932
- Epiphragmophora zilchi Weyrauch, 1960
