= Trichodiscina =

Scientific classification
- Kingdom: Animalia
- Phylum: Mollusca
- Class: Gastropoda
- Order: Stylommatophora
- Family: Trichodiscinidae
- Subfamily: Trichodiscininae
- Genus: Trichodiscina; Martens, 1892

Genus of gastropods

Trichodiscina is a genus of gastropods belonging to the family Trichodiscinidae.

The species of this genus are found in Central America.

Species:

- Trichodiscina cordovana (L.Pfeiffer, 1858)
- Trichodiscina hinkleyi Pilsbry, 1920
- Trichodiscina oajacensis (L.Pfeiffer, 1842)
- Trichodiscina sinaloa Pilsbry, 1954
- Trichodiscina suturalis (L.Pfeiffer, 1846)
