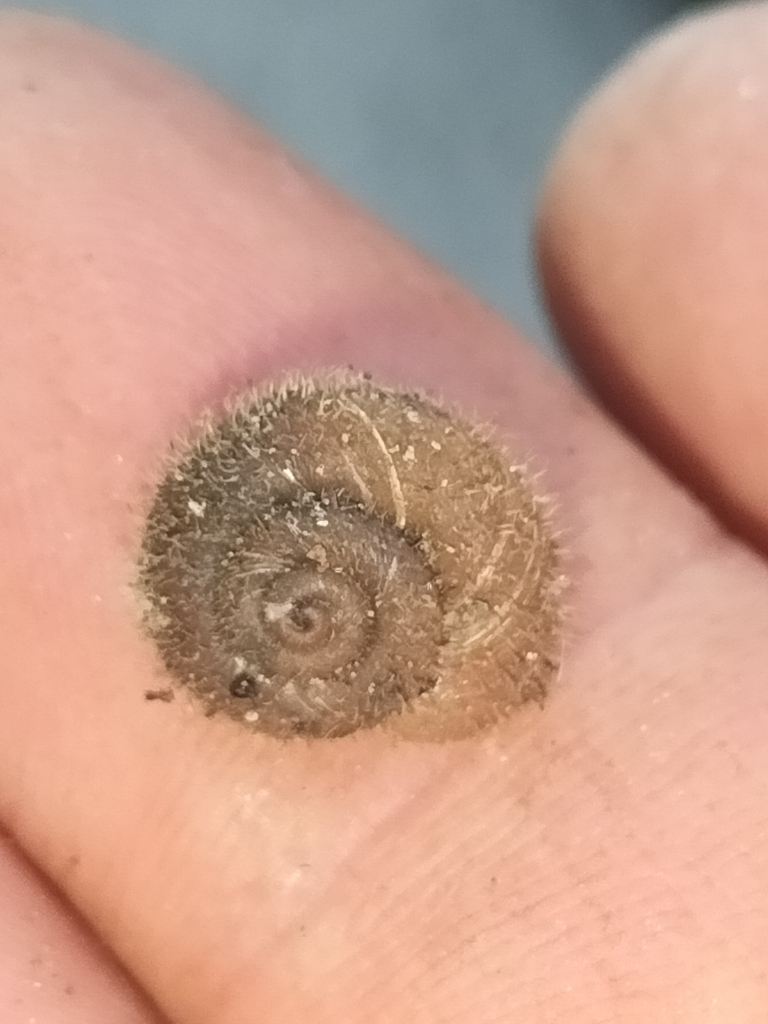

Conservation status
- Vulnerable (IUCN 2.3)

Scientific classification
- Kingdom: Animalia
- Phylum: Mollusca
- Class: Gastropoda
- Order: Stylommatophora
- Family: Camaenidae
- Genus: Tolgachloritis
- Species: T. campbelli

Binomial name
- Tolgachloritis campbelli (Iredale, 1938)

Synonyms
- Mussonena campbelli Iredale, 1938)

= Tolgachloritis campbelli =

Species of gastropod

Tolgachloritis campbelli, the Chillagoe spiny snail, is a species of air-breathing land snail, terrestrial pulmonate gastropod mollusc in the family Camaenidae. The species was first described in 1938 as Mussonena campbelli by Tom Iredale, and was transferred to the genus, Tolgachloritis, in 2010 by John Stanisic and others.

The species is restricted to Queensland (Australia), and the type specimen (AM C54102) was collected from the Chillagoe Caves, in Queensland. This snail is covered in hair-like, spiny scales.

This species is listed as "vulnerable" by the IUCN.
