= Trichodiscinidae =

Scientific classification
- Kingdom: Animalia
- Phylum: Mollusca
- Class: Gastropoda
- Order: Stylommatophora
- Superfamily: Helicoidea
- Family: Trichodiscinidae; H. Nordsieck, 1987

Family of air-breathing land snails

Trichodiscinidae is a family of air-breathing land snails, terrestrial pulmonate gastropod mollusks in the superfamily Helicoidea.

== Distribution ==
Species within this family are distributed in Mexico, Central America, Colombia, Venezuela and the Caribbean.

== Description ==
They have a flattened, discoidal shells that typically range from about 2 to 6 millimeters in diameter.

== Taxonomy ==
The family was formally established by Hartmut Nordsieck in 1987 based on distinct morphological characteristics of the species that set its members apart from related groups.

The species Averellia coactiliata was previously described by Gérard Paul Deshayes in 1839 and the genus Trichodiscina was established by Eduard von Martens in 1892.

The following two subfamilies have been recognized in the Taxonomy of Bouchet & Rocroi (2005):

- Miraverelliinae Schileyko, 1991
  - Miraverellia H. B. Baker, 1922
    - Miraverellia inflata F. G. Thompson, 1959
    - Miraverellia sargi Crosse & P. Fischer, 1872
    - Miraverellia sumichrasti Crosse & P. Fischer, 1872
    - Miraverellia verdensis Dall, 1910
  - Averellia Ancey, 1887
    - Averellia coactiliata Deshayes, 1839
    - Averellia macneili Crosse, 1873
- Trichodiscininae H. Nordsieck, 1987
  - Trichodiscina E. von Martens, 1892
    - Trichodiscina suturalis L.Pfeiffer, 1846
    - Trichodiscina cordovana L.Pfeiffer, 1857
    - Trichodiscina hinkleyi Pilsbry, 1920
    - Trichodiscina sinaloa Pilsbry, 1954
