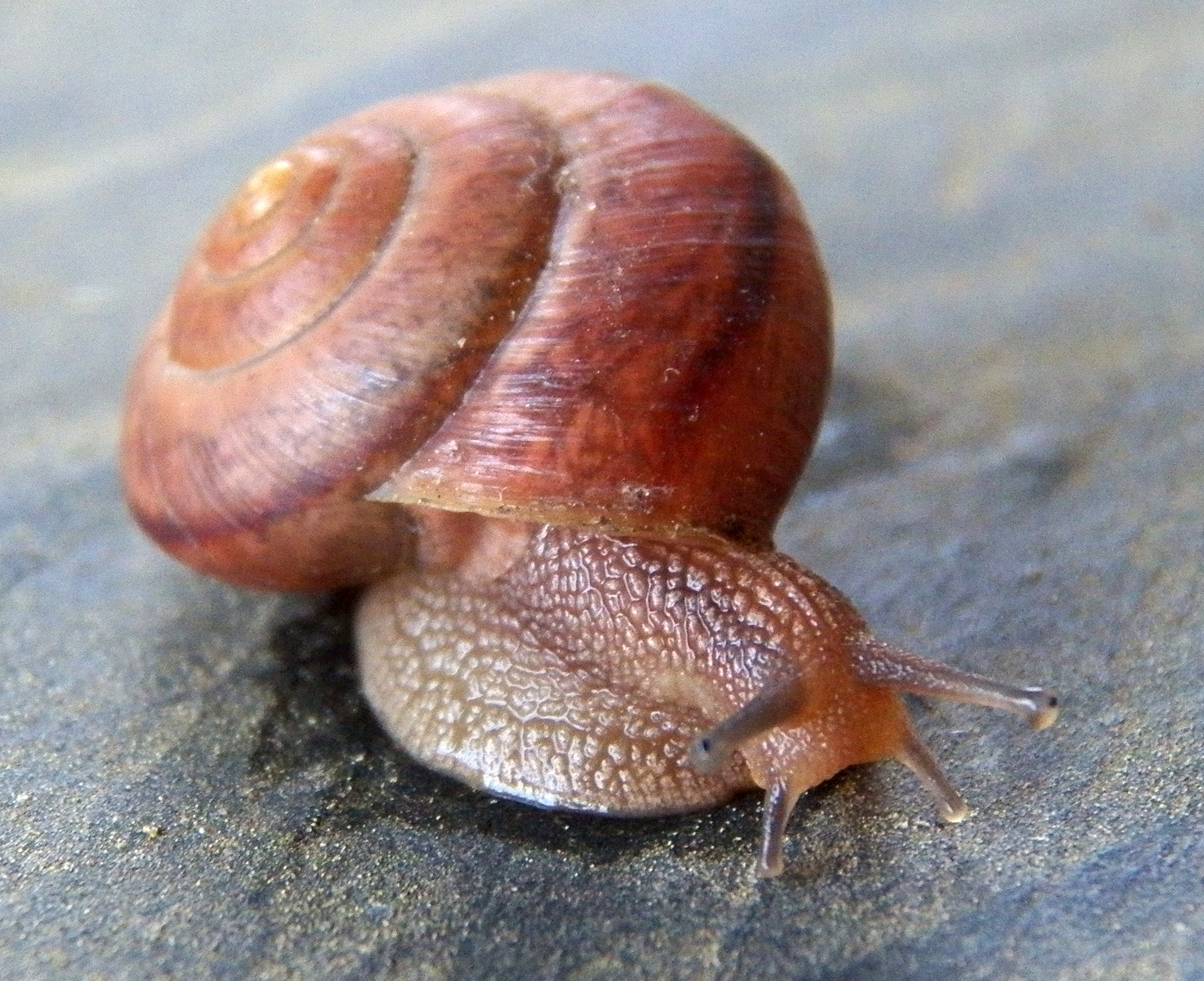
- Bradybaena similaris

Scientific classification
- Kingdom: Animalia
- Phylum: Mollusca
- Class: Gastropoda
- Order: Stylommatophora
- Infraorder: Helicoidei
- Superfamily: Helicoidea; Rafinesque, 1815

Families
- See text.

= Helicoidea =

Superfamily of gastropods

Helicoidea is a taxonomic superfamily of air-breathing land snails, terrestrial pulmonate gastropod mollusks in the order Stylommatophora.

== Taxonomy ==
=== 2017 taxonomy and latest developments ===
The Bouchet et al. 2017 nomenclator provides an up to date system of Helicoidea. The system is in some parts preliminary, as the authors relied on unpublished (as of 2023) phylogenomic study, which did not include all New World taxa. They classified Epiphragmophoridae, Helminthoglyptidae, Humboldtianidae, Monadeniidae and Xanthonychidae (provisionally also Lysinoidae and Echinichidae) as subfamilies of the last taxon, because there are no deep splits between them in the cited unpublished study (see also Koene & Schulenburg 2005).

Cepolidae, Labyrinthidae and Thysanophoridae constitute the sister group of the remaining Helicoidea.

- Camaenidae Pilsbry, 1895
- Canariellidae Schileyko, 1991
- Cepolidae Ihering, 1909
- Elonidae Gittenberger, 1977
- Geomitridae C. Boettger, 1909
- Helicidae Rafinesque, 1815
- Helicodontidae Kobelt, 1904
- Hygromiidae Tryon, 1866
- Labyrinthidae Borrero, Sei, Robinson & Rosenberg, 2017
  - Genus: † Laxecostula Harzhauser & Neubauer, 2020
- Pleurodontidae Ihering, 1912
- Polygyridae Pilsbry, 1895
- Sphincterochilidae Zilch, 1960
- Thysanophoridae Pilsbry, 1926
- Trissexodontidae H. Nordsieck, 1987
- Xanthonychidae Strebel & Pfeffer, 1879
- Trichodiscinidae H. Nordsieck, 1987

=== 2015 taxonomy ===
Razkin et al. (2015) reorganized classification into monophyletic taxa according to the molecular phylogeny. This study is focus on Western Palaearctic species. The Hygromiidae s.l. family was divided into three families, Canariellidae, Geomitridae and Hygromiidae. Moreover, the family Cochlicellidae was including within the Geomitridae family as a tribe (Cochlicellini).

The classification proposed for Western Palaearctic Helicoidea is as follows:

- Bradybaenidae (now Bradybaeninae - subfamily of Camaenidae)
- Camaenidae
- Canariellidae
- Elonidae
- Geomitridae
  - Geomitrinae
    - Cochlicellini
    - Geomitrini
    - Plentuisini
    - Ponentinini
  - Helicellinae
    - Cernuellini
    - Helicellini
    - Trochoideini
- Helicodontidae
- Helicidae
  - Ariantinae
  - Helicinae
    - Allognathini
    - Helicini
    - Otalini
    - Thebini
  - Murellinae
- Humboldtianidae
- Hygromiidae
  - Ciliellinae
  - Hygromiinae
  - Leptaxinae
- Sphincterochilidae
- Trissexodontidae
  - Gittenbergeriinae
  - Trissexodontinae

=== 2012 taxonomy ===
Thompson & Naranjo-García (2012) described a new family Echinichidae and placed it to the superfamily Xanthonychoidea. Therefore, the family Xanthonychidae was moved from Helicoidea to Xanthonychoidea.

=== 2005 taxonomy ===
There are 19 families within the superfamily Helicoidea according to the taxonomy of the Gastropoda by Bouchet & Rocroi, 2005.

- Helicidae
- Bradybaenidae
- Camaenidae
- Cepolidae
- Cochlicellidae
- Elonidae
- Epiphragmophoridae
- Halolimnohelicidae
- Helicodontidae
- Helminthoglyptidae
- Humboldtianidae
- Hygromiidae
- Monadeniidae
- Pleurodontidae
- Polygyridae
- Sphincterochilidae
- Thysanophoridae
- Trissexodontidae
- Xanthonychidae

According to H. Nordsieck the family Xanthonychidae (sensu Hausdorf & Bouchet) is probably polyphyletic (contains several different lineages) and therefore should be divided into several families.

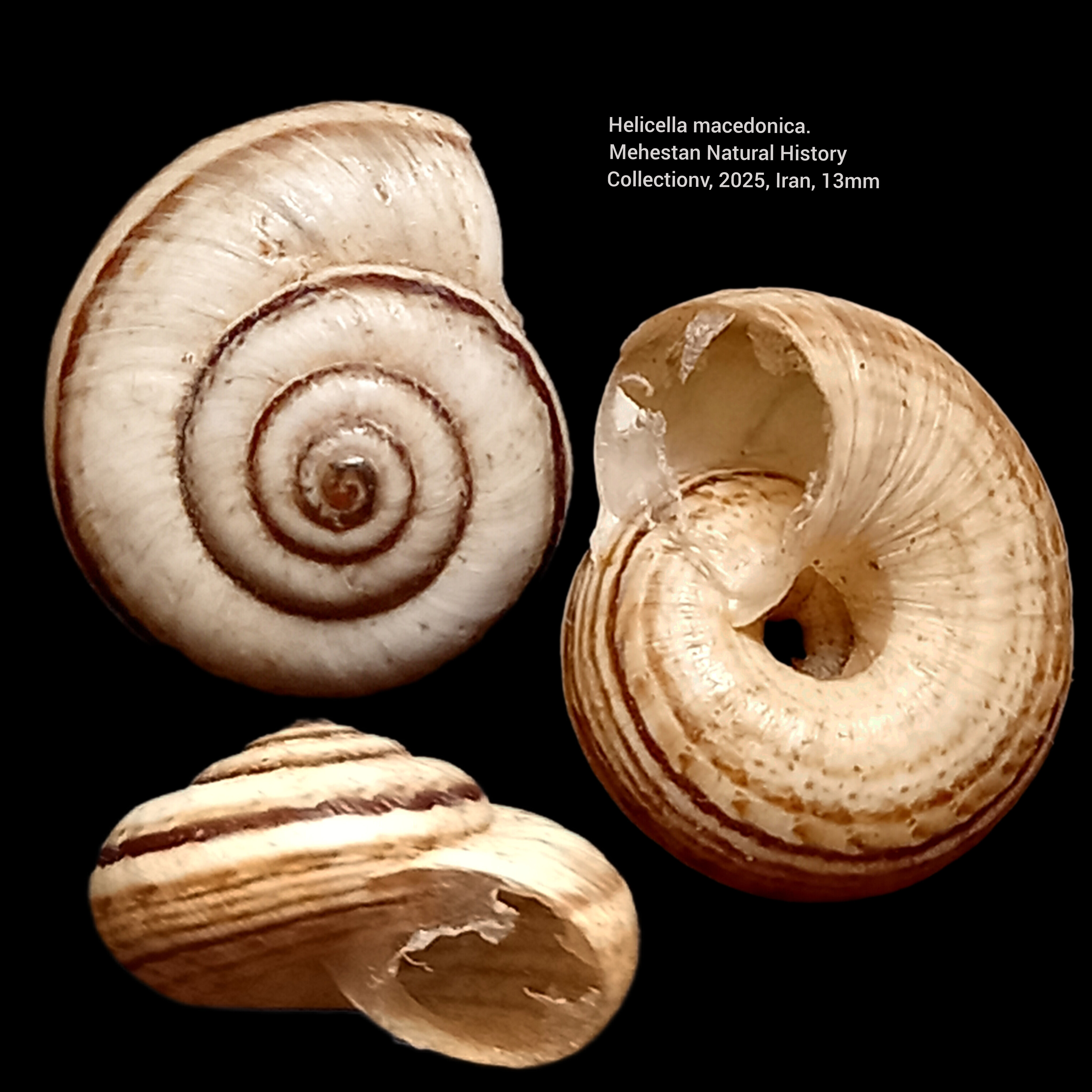
Helicella macedonica
