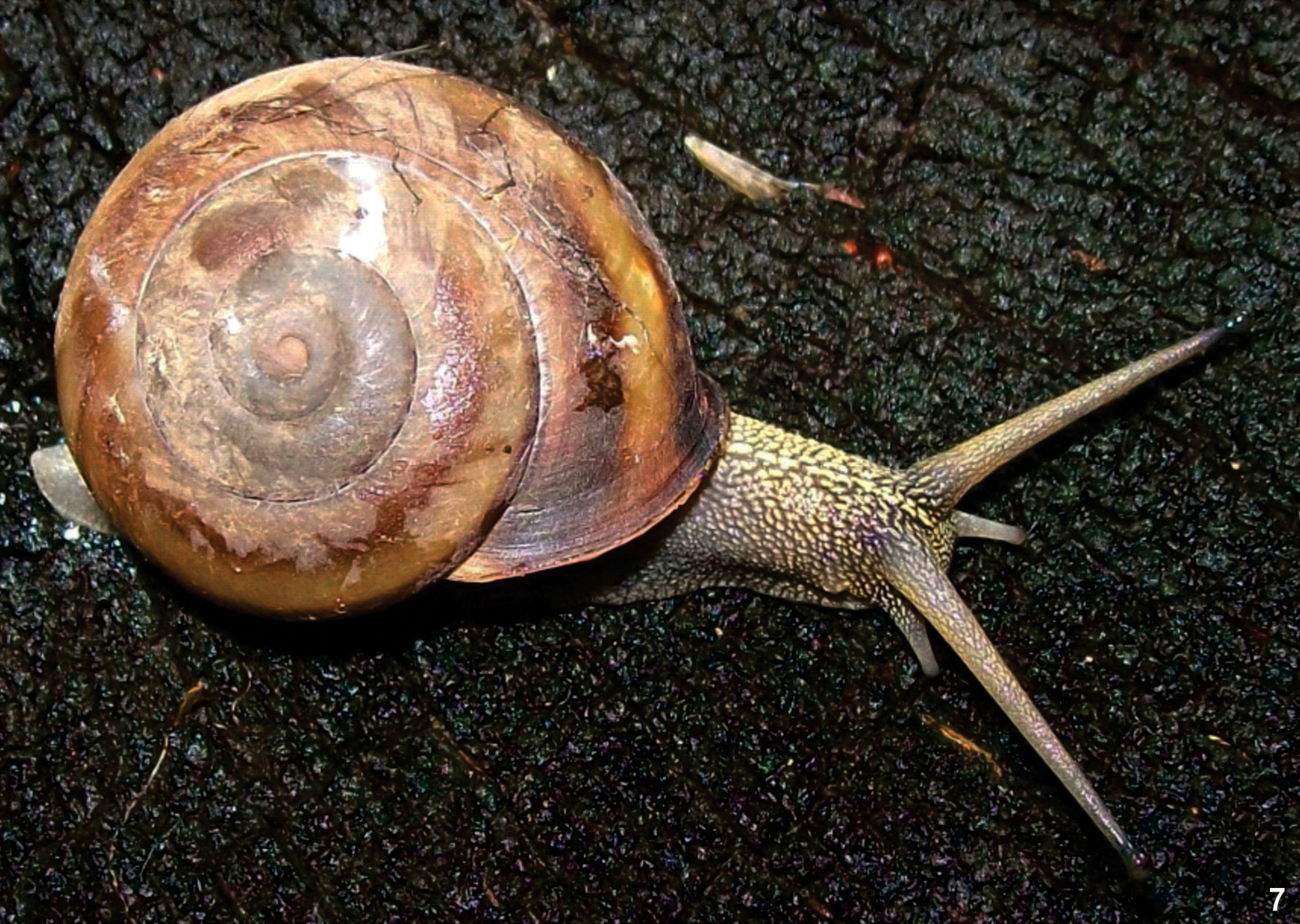
- live Minaselates paradoxa
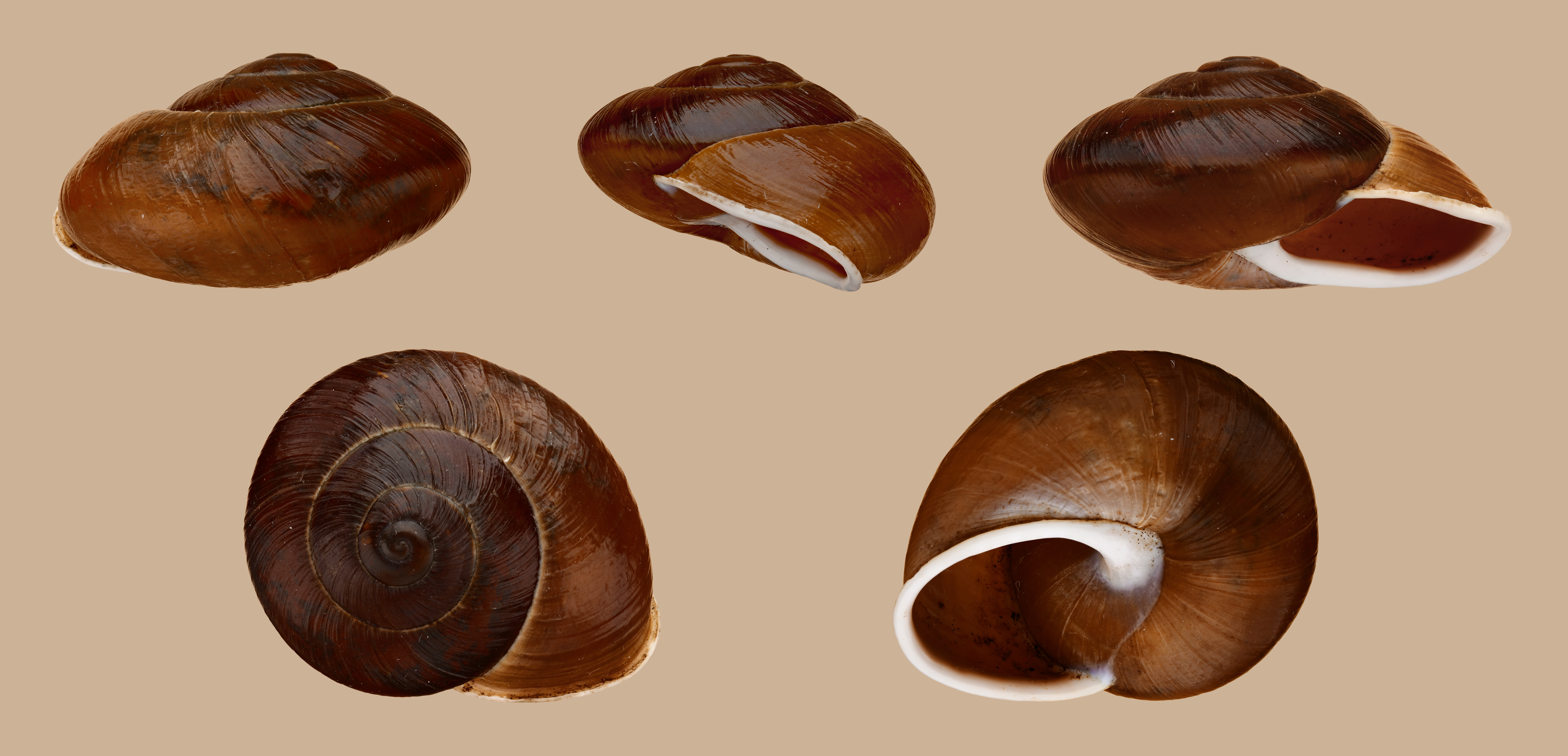
- Epiphragmophora clausomphalos shell

Scientific classification
- Kingdom: Animalia
- Phylum: Mollusca
- Class: Gastropoda
- Order: Stylommatophora
- Family: Xanthonychidae
- Subfamily: Epiphragmophorinae; Hoffmann, 1928

Genera
- See text

= Epiphragmophorinae =

Family of gastropods

Epiphragmophorinae is a subfamily of air-breathing land snails, terrestrial pulmonate gastropod mollusks in the family Xanthonychidae (according to the taxonomy of the Gastropoda by Bouchet & Rocroi, 2005). This family has no subfamilies.

Shileyko (2004) listed 40 species within Epiphragmophorinae. There are about 65 recognized species within Epiphragmophorinae in 2017.

== Anatomy ==
This family is defined by the absence of a diverticulum. These snails have one dart apparatus with a stylophore (dart sac), and one or two mucous glands that are inserted on the dart sac and on the accessory sac, or at the base of the dart sac.

== Genera ==
Genera within the subfamily Epiphragmophorinae include:

- Angrandiella Ancey, 1886
- Dinotropis Pilsbry & Cockerell, 1937
- Doeringina Ihering, 1929
- Epiphragmophora Doering, 1874 - the type genus of the family Epiphragmophoridae. It occurs from Argentina to Bolivia.
- Minaselates Cuezzo & Pena, 2017 - with the only species Minaselates paradoxa Cuezzo & Pena, 2017
- Pilsbrya Ancey, 1887 - synonym: Poecilostola Ancey 1886
