= Echinix =

Scientific classification
- Kingdom: Animalia
- Phylum: Mollusca
- Class: Gastropoda
- Order: Stylommatophora
- Family: Xanthonychidae
- Subfamily: Echinichinae; Thompson & Naranjo-García, 2012
- Genus: Echinix; Thompson & Naranjo-García, 2012

Diversity
- 3 species

Genus of gastropods

Echinix is a genus of air-breathing land semi-slugs. Echinix is the only genus in the subfamily Echinichinae, terrestrial pulmonate gastropod molluscs in the family Xanthonychidae. This genus and subfamily was described in December 2012.

== Distribution ==
The subfamily Echinichinae is endemic to states Tamaulipas and Querétaro in northeastern Mexico.

== Species ==
Species in the genus Echinix include:

- Echinix ochracea Thompson & Naranjo-García, 2012
- Echinix granulata Thompson & Naranjo-García, 2012
- Echinix rugosa Thompson & Naranjo-García, 2012

== Description ==
Species in the genus Echinix are semi-slugs, which have their shells completely hidden under the mantle. There are numerous glandular papillae on the dorsal part of the body. Dart sac is a part of its reproductive system.
