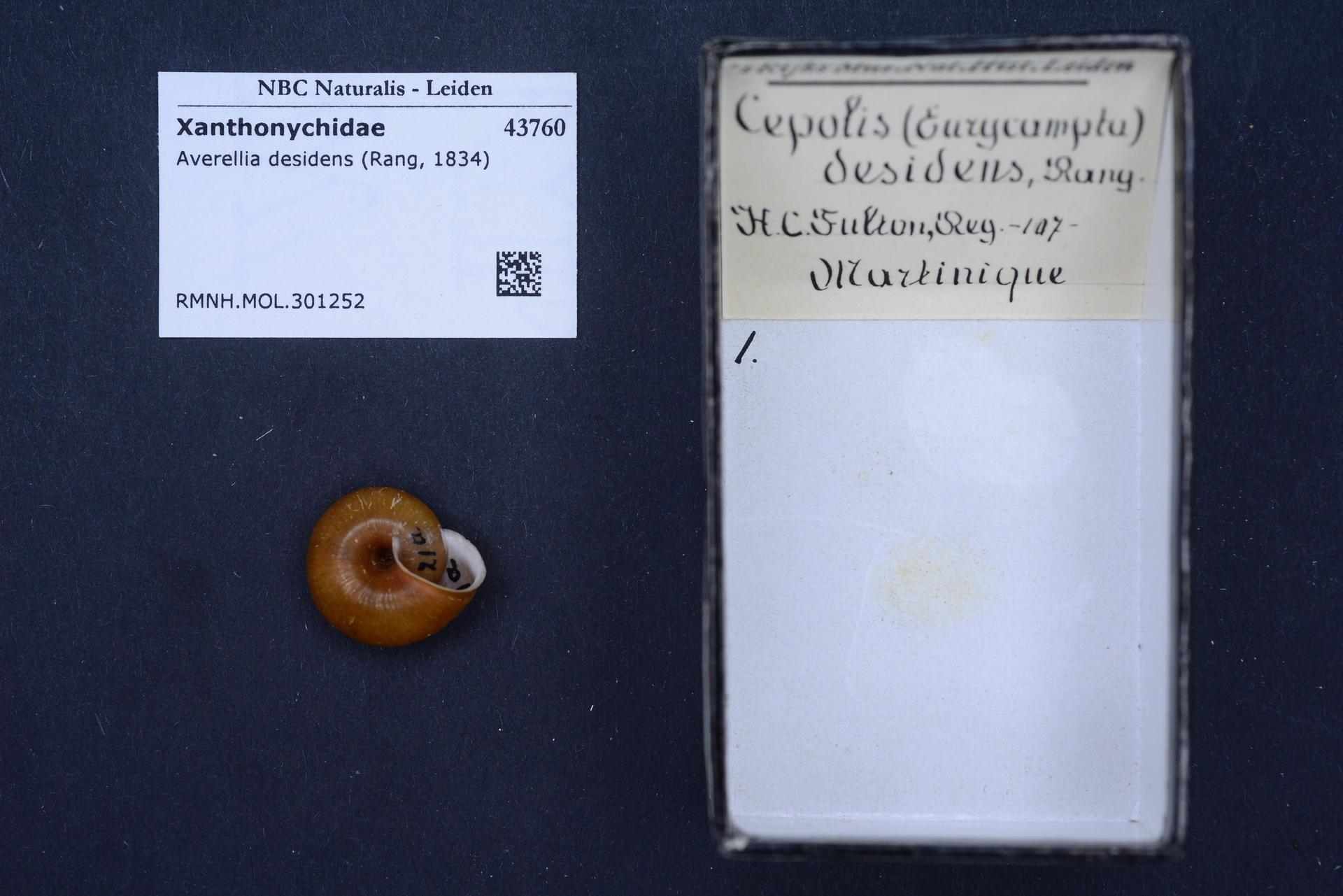
- Averellia desidens shell

Scientific classification
- Kingdom: Animalia
- Phylum: Mollusca
- Class: Gastropoda
- Order: Stylommatophora
- Superfamily: Helicoidea
- Family: Xanthonychidae; Strebel & Pfeffer, 1879

Type genus
- Xanthonyx

Synonyms
- Epiphragmophoridae Hoffmann, 1928

= Xanthonychidae =

Family of gastropods

Xanthonychidae is a family of air-breathing land snails, terrestrial pulmonate gastropod mollusks in the superfamily Helicoidea.

This family is within the superorder Eupulmonata (according to the taxonomy of the Gastropoda by Bouchet & Rocroi, 2005).

== 2017 taxonomy ==
The family Xanthonychidae consists of the following subfamilies:

- Echinichinae F.G. Thompson & Naranjo-García, 2012
- Epiphragmophorinae Hoffmann, 1928
- Helminthoglyptinae Pilsbry, 1939
- Humboldtianinae Pilsbry, 1939
- Lysinoinae Hoffmann, 1928
  - tribe Lysinoini Hoffmann, 1928
  - tribe Leptariontini H. Nordsieck, 1987 - synonym: Tryonigentinae Schileyko, 1991
  - tribe Metostracini H. Nordsieck, 1987
- Metostracinae H. Nordsieck, 1987: synonym of Metostracini H. Nordsieck, 1987 (original rank)
- Monadeniinae H. Nordsieck, 1987
- Xanthonychinae Strebel & Pfeffer, 1879

Trichodiscininae H. Nordsieck, 1987: belongs to the family Trichodiscinidae H. Nordsieck, 1987

Lysinoidae may be treated as a separate family with subfamilies Leptariontinae, Lysinoinae and Metostracinae.

== Genera ==
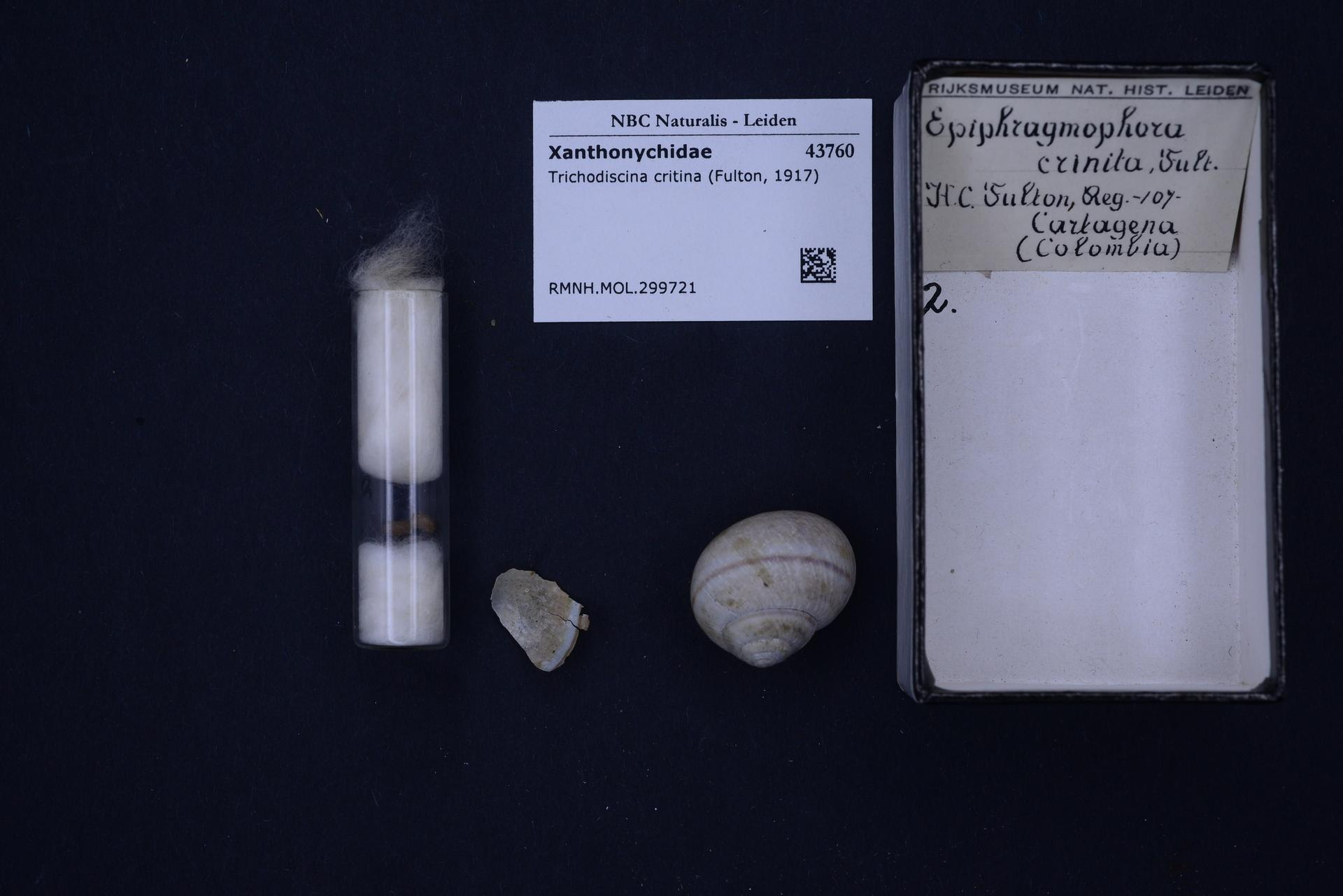
Trichodiscina critina shell

Genera in the family Xanthonychidae include:

Subfamily Echinichinae F.G. Thompson & Naranjo-García, 2012

- Echinix F.G. Thompson & Naranjo-García, 2012

Subfamily Epiphragmophorinae Hoffmann, 1928

- Angrandiella Ancey, 1886
- Dinotropis Pilsbry & Cockerell, 1937
- Doeringina Ihering, 1929
- Epiphragmophora Doering, 1875
- Karlschmidtia F. Haas, 1955
- Minaselates Cuezzo & Pena, 2017
- Pilsbrya Ancey, 1887

subfamily Helminthoglyptinae Pilsbry, 1939

Subfamily Humboldtianinae Pilsbry, 1939

- Tribe Bunnyini H. Nordsieck, 1987
  - Bunnya H. B. Baker, 1942
- Tribe Humboldtianini Pilsbry, 1939
  - Humboldtiana Ihering, 1892

Subfamily Lysinoinae Hoffmann, 1928

- Tribe Leptariontini H. Nordsieck, 1987
  - Leptarionta Crosse & P. Fischer, 1872
  - Semiconchula Naranjo-Garcia & Polaco, 2000
  - Tryonigens Pilsbry, 1927
- Tribe Lysinoini Hoffmann, 1928
  - Lysinoe H. Adams & A. Adams, 1855
- Tribe Metostracini H. Nordsieck, 1987
  - Cryptostrakon W.G. Binney, 1879
  - Metostracon Pilsbry, 1900

Subfamily Monadeniinae H. Nordsieck, 1987

- Monadenia Pilsbry, 1895

Subfamily Xanthonychinae Strebel & Pfeffer, 1879

- Xanthonyx Crosse & P. Fischer, 1867 - the type genus of the family Xanthonychidae
